= Berekuso =

Berekuso Akuapem
- Town
- Location of Berekuso in Eastern Region, Ghana
- Coordinates: 5°45′33″N 0°13′12″W
- Country: Ghana
- Region: Eastern Region
- District: Akuapem South District
- Time zone: GMT
  - Summer (DST): GMT

Berekuso is a town in the Eastern Region of Ghana, approximately an hour from Accra. It is located in the foothills of the Aburi Ridge, on a road linking the Accra suburb of Kwabenya with the hills around Aburi. The town is known for being the location of Ashesi University, the first liberal arts college in sub-Saharan Africa.

Berekuso is the westernmost town traditionally inhabited by the Akuapem people. According to the 2010 census of Ghana, the population was 1,759.

== Festival ==
The People of Berekuso celebrate Ohum and this ceremony is usually held in February. Ohum is one of Ghana's many festivals that see attendance from people from all walks of life including the diaspora.

For many decades, the Ohum Festival has been a staple of Ghana's colourful, vibrant and diverse cultural expression, bringing together people from all walks of life to celebrate themes of victory, gratitude and harvest, in unity. However, even before Odwira became a part of Ghana's cultural landscape it had long been celebrated by the people of Abiriw, Dawu and Awukugua in the Eastern Region.

The Ohum festival is celebrated to mark the beginning of harvesting new farm crops, just like the Homowo of the Gas, Ahoboa and Bakatue of the people of Elmina, and Aboakyere of the Awutus and Afutus, Kundum of the Ahantas and Nzemas, Adaekese of the Ashantis, Hogbotsotso of Anlo (Ewes), Dambaa of the Dagombas, and Apoo of Bono and Bono East region.

Ohumwas an ancient traditional festival of the people of Akuapem, particularly the Larteh and Okere people including Abiriw who are Guans.

== Notable places ==
- Ashesi University
