= Akuapim-Mampong =

Akuapim-Mampong Akwapim-Mampong
- Town
- Location within Ghana
- Coordinates: 5°54′51″N 0°8′25″W
- Country: Ghana
- Region: Eastern Region
- District: Akuapim North District
- Elevation: 1,526 ft (465 m)
- Time zone: GMT
  - Summer (DST): GMT

Akuapim-Mampong is a town in the Akuapim North district of the Eastern Region of Ghana. It shares boundaries with Mamfe forming part of the Akuapem Benkum Division which consist of Guan towns of Larteh heritage. It is famous for being the first place cocoa was planted in Ghana by Tetteh Quarshie.

== History ==
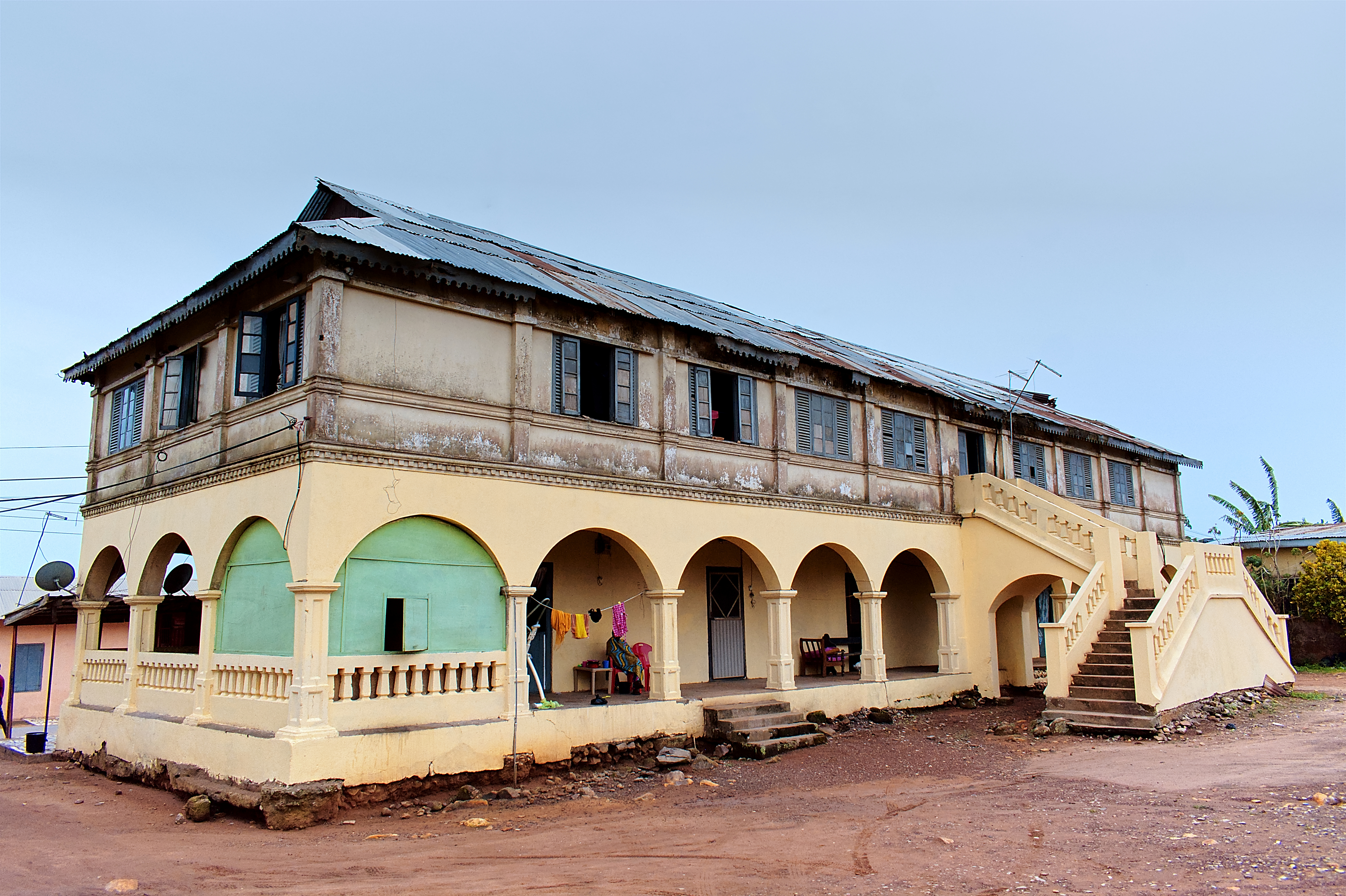
Old mansion

A 1772 Dutch report included the name Mampo (Mampong) in their records. This indicates that Mampong had been founded before 1772. The name Mampong might have been taken from the Shai village, Mankpon. Another tradition indicated that early settlers, after defeating an invading Asante army moved from an old settlement to a new one – the Damti shrine neighbourhood.

Mampong became famous when Tetteh Quarshie planted in 1879 some cocoa seeds in the town. He had brought them from Fernando Po. A plantation was set up in the 1890s to teach farmers the correct methods of raising the cocoa plant and other crops. Farmers of Mampong became the pioneers of the cocoa industry in Ghana.

On July 7, 2017 Ọbádélé Bakari Kambon, linguist, scholar, and professor at the University of Ghana at Legon, was enstooled as the Banmuhene Kyidɔmhene of Akuapem Mampɔn, (spelled as "Akuapim Mampong" throughout the rest of the article). In that role he served as the Banmuhene's king of the rear-guard for the Akuapem Mampɔn traditional area, and was the first person from the African diaspora to be given this honour. It is both a warrior title/role as well as a spiritual one. On 2 October 2026, Kambon, by then a full professor at the University of Ghana, rose from the position of Banmuhene Kyidɔmhene when he was enstooled as the Apagyahene (ruler of upliftment) and Sunsum Ɔsahene (spirit warrior-ruler) of Akuapem Mampɔn.

== Festival ==
The people of Mampong celebrate Ohum and this ceremony is usually held in September/October. Ohum is one of Ghana's many festivals that see attendance from people from all walks of life including the diaspora.

For many decades, the Ohum Festival has been a staple of Ghana diverse cultural expression. Odwira had long been celebrated by the people of Abiriw, Dawu and Awukugua in the Eastern Region.

The Ohum festival is celebrated to mark the beginning of harvesting new farm crops, just like the Homowo of the Gas, Ahoboa and Bakatue of the Ahantas, and Aboakyere of the Awutus and Afutus, Kundum of the Fantes, Adaekese of the Ashantis, Hogbotsotso of Anlo (Ewes), Dambaa of the Dagombas, and Apoo of Bono and Bono East region.

Ohum is an ancient traditional festival of the people of Akuapem, particularly the Larteh and Okere people including Abiriw who are Guans.

== Health care ==
Akuapim-Mampong is the home Centre for Scientific Research into Plant Medicine. The centre conducts research in the use of plant medicine in the cure of various ailments.

There is also the Tetteh Quarshie Memorial Hospital.

== Notable places ==
- Tetteh Quarshie cocoa farm

== Education ==
Mampong has several educational institutions across all the town.

Mampong is also known for its special education for the deaf (Mampong Senior Technical School for the Deaf).

Below are some of the secondary schools in Mampong Akuapem:

- Demonstration School for the Deaf
- Presbyterian Senior High School
