= Abiriw =

Abiriw Akuapem
- Town
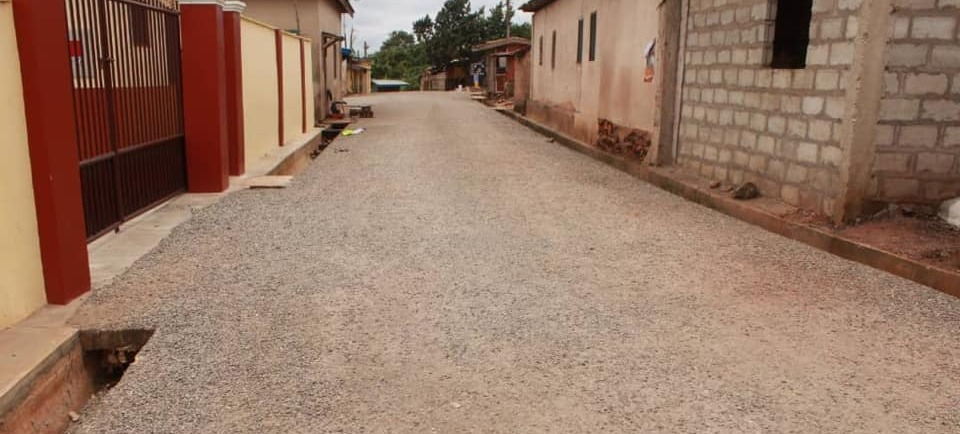

- Location of Abiriw in Eastern Region, Ghana
- Country: Ghana
- Region: Eastern Region
- District: Okere District
- Time zone: GMT
  - Summer (DST): GMT

Abiriw is a town in the Okere District Assembly in the Eastern Region of Ghana. It shares border with Akropong and Dawu.

On its southern border is Abiriw Sacred Grove, which has an area of 400 square mile.

== History ==
Abiriw is one of the Guan states in Akuapem. The first point of settlement on the Akuapem hills was Ademirekusu, a place near a town called Obosomase. The initial settlements were just isolated villages. After some time for security reasons the people decided to come together to form one town.

The name abiriw according to historians derives from a Kyerepong( a local language for a specific Guan clan) phrase 'ζνε ζηι δζμ αβιριωα' {sic; = ɔnɛ ɔni dɔm abiriwa} (let us come together or let us live in a cluster). It later became known as 'Abiriwa' and subsequently as 'Abiriw'."

== Festival ==
The people of Abiriw celebrate Ohum and this ceremony is usually held in December/January. Ohum is one of Ghana's many festivals that see attendance from people from all walks of life including the diaspora.

For many decades, the Ohum Festival has been a staple of Ghana's cultural expression. Even before Odwira became a part of Ghana's cultural landscape it had long been celebrated by the people of Abiriw, Dawu and Awukugua in the Eastern Region.

The Ohum festival is celebrated to mark the beginning of harvesting new farm crops, just like the Homowo of the Gas, Ahoboa and Bakatue of the Ahantas, and Aboakyere of the Awutus and Afutus, Kundum of the Fantes, Adaekese of the Ashantis, Hogbotsotso of Anlo (Ewes), Dambaa of the Dagombas, and Apoo of Bono and Bono East region.

Ohum is an ancient traditional festival of the people of Akuapem, particularly the Larteh and Okere people including Abiriw who are Guans.

=== The new yam festival ===
This is an annual mini festival that is celebrated every July to welcome yam into the town. This is said to signify prosperity

== The Abiriw Sacred Grove ==
The Abiriw sacred grove can be located on the southern border of the town. The grove inhabits several birds and butterflies from different species. A total of 1169 individual butterflies were trapped across all sites representing 89 species from 10 families.

== Clash with Akropong ==
In 2002 - 2003, there was a clash between Abiriw and its neighbouring town Akropong. This disputes resulted in the death of many lives. This was 2002 - 2003.

The dispute affected development activities in the otherwise peace-loving communities of the Akuapem State whose citizens wear broad smiles even in the face of extreme provocation.

Consequently, for 20 years the divisional chiefs of Aburi, Larteh and Adukrom refused to attend the Odwira Festival of the chiefs and people of Akuapem at Akropong.

=== koforidua peace accord ===
The five divisional chiefs of Okuapeman on 27 August 2013 signed a peace accord in Koforidua and called on other chiefs and the people of the area to dedicate themselves to maintaining peace and unity among themselves.

The Koforidua Peace Accord brings to an end the 20-year-old chieftaincy dispute that has caused deep divisions among the chiefs and the people of the area.

The five chiefs, who signed the accord, as well as the Eastern Regional Minister, Ms Helen A. Ntoso, and her team that facilitated the mediation efforts, deserve commendation for a good work done.

== Transport ==
Abiriw is north east of Accra, and the journey from Accra to Akropong is 1 hour 25 minutes. The distamce is 49.4 km

Due to the altitude of Abiriw, the climate is a lot cooler than neighbouring Accra. The road which climbs the hillside to Abiriw is a toll road

There is a higher charge for vans and lorries. From the road most of Greater Accra is visible below, although the one stopping space for pictures on this section of road has a "No Stopping" sign.

== Economy ==
Farming Activities:

Abiriw can be described as an averagely dynamic center of farming and trading activities. Its suburbs such as Awukugua, Dawu, Mintakrom, Adukrom, Okrakwadwo Garikope, Nyensi, Deveme, Nkyenoa, Sanfo, Lakpa, Amahi, etc. produce more than a quarter of the foodstuffs that are sent to Accra and Tema.

With its special cassava species, the lower part of the Constituency on the main Adukrom Koforidua road is an area where the President's special initiative for cassava production could receive a massive boost.

Social Amenities:

There is also a private commercial institution which specializes in training in Information Communication Technology. The location of the town has made it easier for the construction of three mobile phone cell sites; one by AitrelTigo and the others by MTN. Plans are far advanced to site other communication cell sites in the town. Radio communication in the town is therefore very much enhanced.

There is also a clinic, a market, and a reliable water supply from the Booster Station located just at the foot of the hill. The town's electricity supplies are unfailing and it is expected that the service providers of water could do their best to improve its current performance in the town.

== Notable people ==
- Dan Botwe
