= Awukugua =

Awukugua Akuapem
- Town
- Location of Awukugua in Eastern Region, Ghana
- Country: Ghana
- Region: Eastern Region
- District: Okere District
- Time zone: GMT
  - Summer (DST): GMT

Awukugua is a town in the Okere District Assembly in the Eastern Region of Ghana. It shares border with Abiriw and Dawu.'

== Festival ==
The people of Abiriw celebrate Ohum and this ceremony is usually held in November/December. Ohum is one of Ghana's many festivals that see attendance from people from all walks of life including the diaspora.

The Ohum festival is celebrated to mark the beginning of harvesting new farm crops, just like the Homowo of the Gas, Ahoboa and Bakatue of the Ahantas, and Aboakyere of the Awutus and Afutus, Kundum of the Fantes, Adaekese of the Ashantis, Hogbotsotso of Anlo (Ewes), Dambaa of the Dagombas, and Apoo of Bono and Bono East region.

Ohum was an ancient traditional festival of the people of Akuapem, particularly the Larteh and Okere people including Abiriw who are Guans.

== Notable people ==
- Okomfo Anokye
