= Dawu, Ghana =

Dawu Asamang Dawu State
- Nation State
- Motto: Onetamea yiewosee
- Location of Dawu in Eastern Region, Ghana
- Country: Ghana
- Region: Eastern Region
- District: Okere District

Government
  - Omanhene of Dawu State: Odeneho Asare Akyeahene III
- Time zone: GMT
  - Summer (DST): GMT

Dawu is a Nation State in the Okere District Eastern Region of Ghana. It shares border with Abiriw, Koforidua, Larteh and Awukugua

== Festival ==
The people of Dawu celebrate Ohum and this ceremony is usually held in December/January. Ohum is one of Ghana's many festivals that see attendance from people from all walks of life including the diaspora.

The Ohum festival is celebrated to mark the beginning of harvesting new farm crops, just like the Homowo of the Gas, Ahoboa and Bakatue of the Ahantas, and Aboakyere of the Awutus and Afutus, Kundum of the Fantes, Adaekese of the Ashantis, Hogbotsotso of Anlo (Ewes), Dambaa of the Dagombas, and Apoo of Bono and Bono East region.

Ohum was an ancient traditional festival of the people of Akuapem, particularly the Larteh and Okere people including Abiriw who are Guans.

== Notable places and people ==
- Dreams FC
- Dawu Sports Stadium
