= Emmanuel Noi Omaboe =

Ghanaian economist and traditional ruler

Wereko Ampem II
- Amanokromhene, Gyaasehene of Akuapem

Chief of Amanokrom
- Reign: 1975 – 2005
- Investiture: 1975
- Predecessor: Ofei Dankwa
- Born: Emmanuel Noi Omaboe; 29 October 1930; Amanokrom
- Died: 26 November 2005 (aged 75)
- Spouse: Letitia Omaboe
- House: Asona Clan of Amanokrom
- Religion: Presbyterian
- Occupation: Investment consultant; Civil servant; Traditional ruler

Chancellor of the University of Ghana
- In office 1998–2005
- Preceded by: Jerry Rawlings
- Succeeded by: Kofi Annan

Commissioner for Economic Affairs
- In office 1966–1969
- President: Joseph Arthur Ankrah (1966–1969); Akwasi Amankwa Afrifa (1969)

Government Statistician
- In office 1960–1966
- President: Kwame Nkrumah

Deputy Government Statistician
- In office 1959–1960

Personal details
- Education: Accra Academy
- Alma mater: London School of Economics

Oyeeman Wereko Ampem II, GM (born Emmanuel Noi Omaboe, 29 October 1930 – 26 November 2005) was a Ghanaian civil servant, businessman and traditional ruler. He was Gyaasehene of Akuapem and Ohene (Chief) of Amanokrom from 1975 till his death in 2005. He served as Commissioner for Economic Affairs in Ghana from 1967 to 1969 and Government Statistician from 1960 to 1966.

== Early life ==
Emmanuel Noi Omaboe was born on 29 October 1930 at Amanokrom in Akuapim. His parents were Peter Nortey Omaboe of Osu and Mary Opeibea Awuku of Amanokrom.

His education began at Mamfe Presbyterian School in 1936 and continued at Suhum Presbyterian Middle School. Omaboe was educated at Accra Academy from 1946 to 1950. He entered the University College of the Gold Coast in 1951, to read economics. In 1954, under government scholarship, Omaboe proceeded to the London School of Economics to complete his economics degree in statistics, graduating with a first in the subject. He had a year at a postgraduate masters studentship in Statistics at LSE before returning to Ghana.

== Public service ==
In 1957, Omaboe joined the University College of Ghana as an economics research fellow and gave lectures in Statistics.

In 1959, he was appointed the deputy government statistician. In 1960, he was elected a member of the International Statistical Institute, and became the first African member of the institute. He was a member of the American Statistical Association and a member of the International Union for the Scientific Study of Population. He was promoted to Government Statistician in July 1960 due to the Africanization policy of the civil service by Kwame Nkrumah. Omaboe was the first Ghanaian to hold this position, and at the age of 29, the youngest head of a government department.

Omaboe was census coordinator for the 1960 Population Census which was the first scientifically conducted population census in Ghana. In October 1961, the State Planning Commission was constituted by Kwame Nkrumah with Omaboe as its chairman and Joseph Henry Mensah assisting him. The State Planning Commission brought about and worked on the Seven-Year Development Plan (1963–1970), which was formally launched in 1964.

After the 1966 coup d'état, Omaboe took up the post of Chairman of the Economic Committee of the National Liberation Council in 1966 and Commissioner for Economic Affairs in 1967. In these roles, Omaboe led the government's policies toward liberalisation; including devaluation of the Cedi, abolition of import licensing and privatisation of loss-making state enterprises.

Omaboe served as a member of the Advisory Committee on Post Adjustment Questions of the U.N. International Civil Service Commission starting in 1967 and ending in 1985. He also served as a council member of the International Statistical Institute starting from 1968 and became its vice president.

In 1980, Omaboe joined the United Nations Investment Committee (IC) which guides the investments of the pension funds and other trust and special funds under the United Nations control. In 1997, he became chairman of the Investment Committee, staying as chairman for the next eight years and made a member emeritus at the end of his service in 2005.

== Business career ==
In 1969, Omaboe retired from public service after ten years' service and set up an investment and economic consultancy, E.N. Omaboe & Associates Limited, of which he served as chairman. In December of that year, he was named to join the Ghana Board of the Barclays Bank D.C.O.,. But the next year, Omaboe spent time on a one-year fellowship at the Harvard Centre for International Affairs. From Harvard, he returned to Ghana and worked at his consultancy whose area of business was new in Ghana in 1970 and also joined the boards of Barclays Bank of Ghana and UTC Estates.

In 1974, he partnered Jake Obetsebi-Lamptey and Peter Hasford in the purchase of advertising firms, Lintas West Africa and Afromedia Ghana from Unilever. He became chairman of Lintas West Africa, immediately after the purchase and was chairman until 2005.

He served as chairman of Reiss & Co. (Ghana) Ltd., a technical trading house with divisions in agriculture, veterinary, information technology and industrial safety supplies.

In 1989, he was a member of a ten-person committee that did work for the establishment of the Ghana Stock Exchange.

In 1991, he had a change in role on the Barclays Bank of Ghana board from director to chairman of the bank. He had served as a director since 1971 when the bank was incorporated and was one of its first four named directors. He retired from the bank's board in 2005 after 34 years service on the board as a director of the bank.

In 1995, together with Kwame Pianim, he co-founded New World Investments, an investment and asset management firm, and was chairman on its founding until his death.

== Other activities ==
Omaboe served as chief patron of the Prison Christian Fellowship of Ghana from 1982 and chairman of the Ghana Social Marketing Foundation from 1993.

He was chairman of the governing council of the University of Ghana Medical School from 1984 to 1999, succeeding Harry Sawyerr, the first chairman. In 1999, he was nominated chancellor of University of Ghana. He was the first Ghanaian other than a head-of-state to be nominated as chancellor of the university.

In 2004, he procured a rare collection of Ashanti Gold weights from a vendor in Germany, and donated the collection to the Institute of African Studies of the University of Ghana as a private deed of gift to promote cultural education within the university.

== Chieftaincy ==
He was installed "Ohene" (Chief) of Amanokrom and "Gyasehene" of Akuapem in 1975. During his time as traditional ruler, he undertook the projects of the construction of the Manko Aba Ahenfie and the Amanokrom Community Centre. The annual Odwira experienced large turn up of indigenous people living elsewhere and foreigners from abroad due to his image.

== Sports ==
Omaboe was a member of the Achimota Golf Club. From 1974 to 1975, he captained the Achimota Golf Club and served as president of the club from 1990 to 1998.

In 1971, Omaboe was chairman of the interim management committee of Accra Hearts of Oak football club.

In 1989, Omaboe was chosen to be Chief Patron and President of the Council of Patrons of Accra Hearts of Oak S. C..

Under Omaboe's presidency of the Council of Patrons of the football club, a total of 42 competitive and ceremonial cups was won and a record was set by winning the Ghana Premier League six (6) consecutive times in 1997, 1998, 1999, 2000, 2001 and 2002. The club for the first time won the CAF Champions League trophy in 2000 and set another Ghanaian record by winning the 8th CAF Super Cup (2001) and crowned this achievements by being the first Club in Africa to win the 1st CAF Confederation Cup in 2004.

== Honours ==
Omaboe received the Grand Medal (Civil Division) of the Republic of Ghana in 1968.

In 1973, Omaboe was elected Honorary Fellow of the Royal Statistical Society, having been a member since 1957. He was made President of the Economic Society of Ghana. Omaboe received an honorary doctorate from the University of Ghana, Legon in 1999.

== Personal life and death ==
Oyeeman married Letitia Manko and the two had five children. A son, Nortey Omaboe, is the Chief Executive of GCNet. A daughter, Norkor Duah, is the Chief Executive of the marketing communications firm, Mullen Lowe Accra and previously served as the Vice President of International Advertising Association.

Omaboe was a Presbyterian and was known to worship at the Ebenezer Presbyterian Church, Osu. He was also a Freemason, belonging to the District Grand Lodge of Ghana.

Oyeeman Wereko Ampem II died of natural causes on 26 November 2005, aged 75. A memorial service was held for him at the Ebenezer Presbyterian Church, Osu. The royal funeral and burial took place at Amanokrom.

== Literature ==
Banful, Alex; Omaboe, E.N. (2006). Model of Leadership Excellence: A Biographical Case Study of Nana Wereko Ampem II. Excellent Pub and Print. ISBN 9988072236.
