= Presbyterian Senior High Technical School, Adukrom =

Location
- Adukrom; Eastern Region; Ghana; 6.01508°N 0.07419°W

Information
- Type: Public high school
- Founder: Presbyterian Church of Ghana
- Status: Active
- School district: Akuapim North District
- Oversight: Ministry of Education
- Gender: Co-educational
- Age: 14 to 18
- Classes offered: General Arts, Home Economics, General Science, General Agriculture, Business, Visual Arts
- Language: English
- Houses: 4
- Colours: Blue and white

Presbyterian Senior High Technical School, is a Presbyterian co-educational second-cycle institution in Adukrom, situated in the Okere District in the Eastern Region of Ghana.

The school runs courses in Business, Science, general arts, general agric, Home Economics and visual arts, leading to the award of a West African Senior School Certificate (WASSCE).

== History ==
A community-based institution was established with the name Adukrom Senior High Technical and later changed to its present name Presbyterian Senior High Technical School by the Ministry of Education (now Ghana Education Service). The general objective of the change in status was to give the Presbyterian Church of Ghana the mandate to be owners or the founder of the school and also provide full secondary school education to the growing number of boys and girls, especially those resident around the Akuapem North and South community.

The school runs both day, boarding and hostel system with majority of the students in the boarding house.

The schools colors are Blue and white. The school has on the grounds of Presbyterian discipline trained a lot of diligent men and women in godliness, good character and responsible.

== Enrollment ==
The school has about 2,500 students enrolled in Business, Science, general arts, general agric, Home Economics and visual arts courses.

== Facilities ==
- 3 Science Laboratories ( Physics, Biology and Chemistry)
- I.C.T Lab
- Library
- Home Economics Lab
- Visual Arts Center
- School Farm
- Sports (standard field for soccer and athletics, basketball court, volley and handball court)
- School Clinic
- Barbering shop

This school is one of the best category [C] schools in the Eastern region, It's the first Presbyterian School establish in Ghana
