= Adukrom =

Adukrom Akuapem
- Town
- Location of Adukrom in Eastern Region, Ghana
- Coordinates: 6.0141°N 0.0777°W
- Country: Ghana
- Region: Eastern Region
- District: Okere District
- Time zone: GMT
  - Summer (DST): GMT

Adukrom is a town in the Okere District Assembly in the Eastern Region of Ghana. It shares borders with Awukugua Akuapem where Okomfo anokye was born. The town is known for the Nifahene Stool of Akuapem and the capital of Okere District and situated on the Togo Atakora hills on the main Ho-Koforidua main trunk road in the northern part of Akuapem.

It is also the political and administrative capital of the Okere Constituency which is currently represented in Parliament by the New Patriotic Party Member of Parliament, Hon. Dan Botwe.

Adukrom has an estimated population of 8,881 in 2013. The town used to be the capital of the Nifa Division of the Akuapem State which was created in 1730. The Nifa Division which is currently the Okere Traditional Area is situated on the extreme north of the Bewase Ridge of the Akuapem Togo Mountains on the North-East of Accra.

== Festival ==
The People of Adukrom celebrate Odwira and this ceremony is usually held in September/October. Odwira is one of Ghana's many festivals that see attendance from people from all walks of life including the diaspora.

For many decades, the Odwira Festival has been seen as part of Ghana's colourful, vibrant and diverse cultural expression, bringing together people from all walks of life to celebrate themes of victory, gratitude and harvest, in unity. However, according to a local paper, even before Odwira became a part of Ghana's cultural landscape it had long been celebrated by the people of Akropong, Amanokrom and Aburi in the Eastern Region.

== Economy ==
Farming Activities:

Adukrom can be described as an averagely dynamic center of farming and trading activities. Its suburbs such as Abiriw, Dawu, Awukugua, Asenema, Krutiase, Mintakrom, Okrakwadwo Garikope, Nyensi, Deveme, Nkyenoa, Sanfo, Lakpa, Amahi, etc. produce more than a quarter of the foodstuffs that are sent to Accra and Tema.

With its special cassava species, the lower part of the Constituency on the main Adukrom Koforidua road is an area where the President's special initiative for cassava production could receive a massive boost.

Social Amenities:

Adukrom hosts two Senior High Schools and four Junior High Schools. There is also a private commercial institution which specializes in training in Information Communication Technology. The location of the town has made it easier for the construction of three mobile phone cell sites; one by AitrelTigo and the others by MTN. Plans are far advanced to site other communication cell sites in the town. Radio communication in the town is therefore very much enhanced.

There is also a Police station, a Clinic, a bank, a market, and a reliable water supply from the Booster Station located just at the foot of the hill between Aseseeso and Adukrom. The town's electricity supplies are unfailing and it is expected that the service providers of water could do their best to improve its current performance in the town.

== Notable people ==
- William Kwasi Aboah, the former Director of Ghana Immigration.
