= Kitase Akuapem =

Kitase
- Town
- Location within Ghana
- Coordinates: 5°51′N 0°11′W
- Country: Ghana
- Region: Eastern Region
- District: Akuapim South Municipal
- Time zone: GMT
  - Summer (DST): GMT

Kitase is a town in the Akuapim South Municipal District of the Eastern Region of south Ghana. Kitase is the Nponuaman of Akuapem (the gate to Akuapem) the entry points from Accra to Akuapem.The Presidential Lodge is located in Kitase-Mpeduase, Mpeduase spelt Peduase. The current and sitting chief of Kitase is Oyeeman Kwasi Ankrah III, who has contributed immensely to the development of Kitase, it environs and Akuapem. The Ghana Police Service station situate at Kitase was solely built by the chief of Kitase

== Festival ==
The people of Kitase celebrate Odwira and this ceremony is usually held in September/October. Odwira is one of Ghana's many festivals that see attendance from people from all walks of life including the diaspora.

For many decades, the Odwira festival has been a staple of Ghana's cultural expression, bringing together people from all walks of life to celebrate themes of victory, gratitude and harvest, in unity. However, even before Odwira became a part of Ghana's cultural landscape it had long been celebrated by the people of Akropong, Amanokrom and Aburi in the Eastern Region.
