= Adawso =

Community in Eastern Region, Ghana

- Country: Ghana
- Region: Eastern Region
- District: Akuapem North Municipal District

Adawso is a farming community in the Akuapem North Municipal District in the Eastern Region of Ghana. It is located along the Koforidua-Mamfe highway.

== Infrastructure ==
- Adawso Bridge over Afram River
- Adawso Chief Palace
- Adawso Fire Service Station

== Notable residents ==
- Nathan Quao
- Charles Odamtten Easmon
- Nicholas Timothy Clerk
- Jane Elizabeth Clerk
- Lawrence Henry Yaw Ofosu-Appiah
- Matilda Johanna Clerk
- Ernest Papa Arko
- Nicholas Timothy Clerk
- Carl Henry Clerk
- Peter Hall (minister)
- Charles Sterling Acolatse
