= Pokrom =

Pokrom Nsabaa
- Town
- Location of Pokrom in Eastern Region
- Coordinates: 5°49′N 0°19′W
- Country: Ghana
- Region: Eastern Region
- District: Nsawam Adoagyire Municipal District

Population (2013)
  - Total: —
- Time zone: GMT
  - Summer (DST): GMT

Pokrom is a beautiful town in the Akuapem South Municipal district, a district in the Eastern Region of Ghana.

Rule by Omanhene Odeneho Nana Asong Yaw II, after late Nana Toah Djan

Pokrom is situated in the Akuapem South District of the Eastern Region of Ghana, approximately 60 kilometers north of Accra.

According to historical records, Pokrom was first founded by Nana Kofi Po, a prominent leader in the area.

== Guan migration and settlement ==
The Akuapem, an ancient ethnic group from the Sahel region of West Africa, migrated to the Akuapem hills and established several as Pokrom Nsaba settlements, including the family of Agona Nsabaa krom. The Guan people played a significant role in shaping the history and culture of the region.

The area is also connected to the Aburi people, who have a rich cultural heritage in the region. The Aburi people are part of the Agona Clan and the Aduana Abrade Division of the Akuapem Traditional Area as Adonten hene stool have a complex history of migration and settlement in the area.

== Cultural significance ==
The history of Pokrom and its connections to the Agona Nsabaa, Guan, and Aburi people highlight the rich cultural diversity and complexity of the region. Understanding this history is essential for appreciating the cultural heritage and traditions of the area.

== Migration ==
In the 17th century, the Akuapem people, a subgroup of the Akan, migrated from the Asante kingdom to the Akuapem hills. The Akuapem people displaced the Guan and established their own settlements, including Pokrom.

== Traditional politics ==
Pokrom became a significant town in the Akuapem Traditional Area, with its own chief and traditional council. The town played an important role in the Akuapem state's political and economic affairs.

== Colonial era ==
During the colonial era, Pokrom was a major center for the production of pineapple, a crop introduced by the British. The town's economy grew significantly, and it became an important hub for trade and commerce.

== Post-independence ==
After Ghana gained independence in 1957, Pokrom continued to grow and develop. The town became a major center for agriculture, with many farmers producing crops such as cocoa, maize, and cassava.

== Modern day ==
Pokrom is a thriving town with a rich cultural heritage. The town is known for its traditional festivals, including the Odwira festival, which is celebrated annually. Pokrom is also home to several historic sites, including the Pokrom Palace, which serves as the residence of the town's chief.

=== Demographics ===
As of the 2021 census, the population of Pokrom was approximately 15,000 people. The town is predominantly inhabited by the Akuapem people.

=== Economy ===
The economy of Pokrom is primarily driven by agriculture, with many farmers producing crops such as pineapple, maize, and cassava. The town is also home to several small-scale industries, including textiles and food processing.

=== Education ===
Pokrom has several educational institutions, including (public/private) primary and Junior high schools. The town is also home to a number of vocational training centers, which provide training in skills such as carpentry and masonry.

=== Healthcare ===
Pokrom has a number of healthcare facilities, including a community health clinic and several other clinics. The town is also served by a number of traditional healers, who provide treatment using traditional herbal remedies

== Cultural heritage ==
Pokrom has a rich cultural heritage, with many traditional festivals and customs. The town is known for its traditional music and dance, including the Akuapem traditional dance.

== Tourism ==
Pokrom is a popular tourist destination, with many visitors drawn to the town's rich cultural heritage and natural beauty. The town is home to several historic sites, including the Pokrom Palace.
