= Akonnedi Shrine =

Akonnedi is a traditional shrine located in Larteh in the Eastern Region of Ghana.
