= Akuapim North Municipal District =

Municipal District in Eastern Region of Ghana

- Municipal District
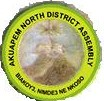
- Seal

- Districts of Eastern Region

- Location of Akuapim North Municipal District within Eastern
- Coordinates: 5°58′40.8″N 0°5′27.6″W
- Country: Ghana
- Region: Eastern
- Capital: Akropong

Government
  - Municipal Chief Executive: Edward Adu Aboagye

Area
  - Total: 544 km^{2} (210 sq mi)

Population (2021 census)
  - Total: 105,315
  - Density: 250.9/km^{2} (650/sq mi)
- Time zone: UTC+0 (GMT)

Akuapim North Municipal District is one of the thirty-three districts in Eastern Region, Ghana. It was originally created as an ordinary district assembly in 1988, when it was known as Akuapim North District, which was created from the former Akuapim District Council. It was elevated to municipal district assembly status on 15 March 2012 to become Akuapim North Municipal District. On 15 March 2018, the northeast part of the district was split off to create Okere District; thus the remaining part has been retained as Akuapim North Municipal District. The municipality is located in the southeast part of Eastern Region and has Akropong as its capital town. Akropong is known as a key location for the celebration of Odwira, which has contributed to tourism in the area.

== List of settlements ==
Settlements of Akuapim North Municipal District
| No. | Settlement | Population | Population year |
|---|---|---|---|
| 1 | Adawso | | |
| 3 | Akropong | 13,785 | 2013 |
| 5 | Amanokrom | | |
| 10 | Kwamoso | | |
| 11 | Larteh Ahenease (Akonnobepow) | | |
| 12 | Larteh Kubease (Akonnobepow) | | |
| 13 | Mamfe | | |
| 14 | Mampong | 3,501 | 2013 |
| 15 | New Mangoase | | |
| 16 | Obosomase | | |
| 17 | Okorase | | |
| 18 | Okra Kwadwo | | |
| 19 | Tinkong | | |
| 20 | Tutu | | |

== Sources ==
- "Akuapim North Municipal District". Statoids.
- Districts: Akuapim North Municipal District
