= Agbadza =

Ewe music and dance style

Agbadza dance
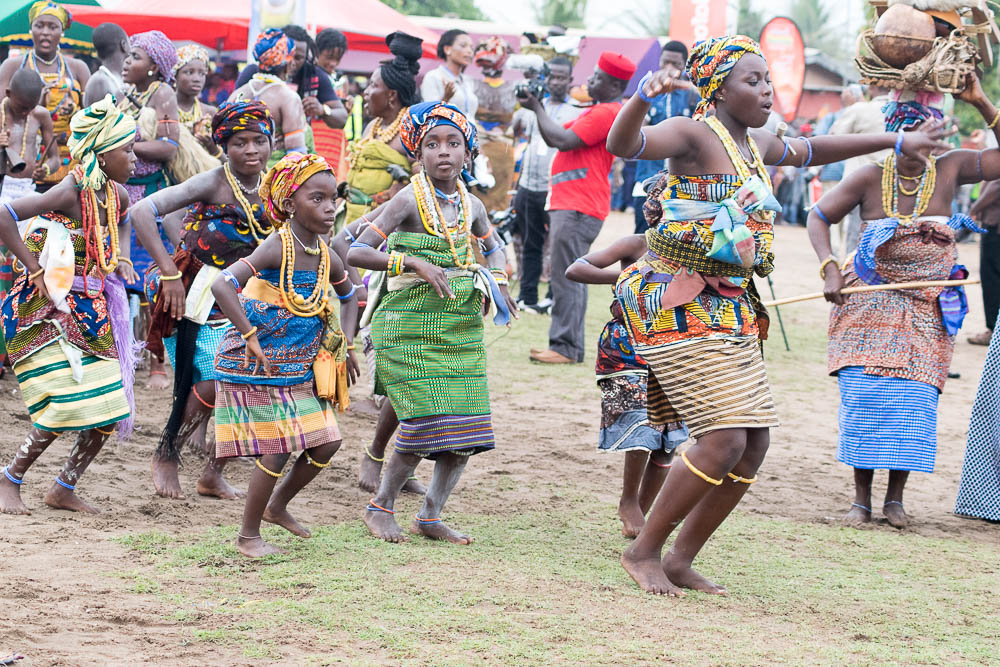
- People dancing to Agbadza in Traditional clothing
- Origin: Ewe of Ghana and Togo

Agbadza is an Ewe music and dance that evolved from the times of war into a very popular recreational dance. It came from a very old war dance called Atrikpui and usually performed by the Ewe people of the Volta Region of Ghana, particularly during the Hogbetsotso Festival, a celebration by the Anlo Ewe people. In addition, it is also performed by Togolese and Beninese of Ewe descent. The dance has five movements in performing it, 1. Banyinyi which is a short introductory in prayer to the gods and ancestors, 2. Vutsortsor which is the main dance, 3. Adzo- which is less energetic and only the master is made to drum along with Gankogui and Axatse, 4. Hatsatsa- historical songs are performed along with Gankogui and Atoke, 5. Vutsortsor- finally, another round of the main dance which usually last for a number of hours. Gankogui is an instrument in a form of a bell where a stick is used to play. Atoke is also an iron banana shaped bell and played with a small forged iron rod. The Atoke can be used in place of the Gankogui they are both used for the same purpose.

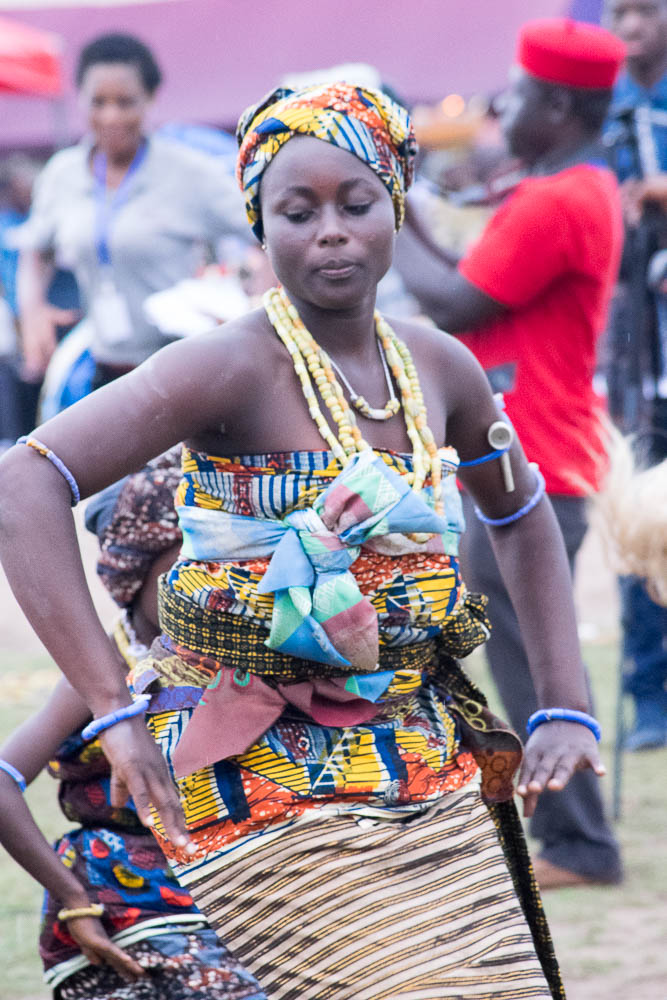
Agbadza dancer

The dance is usually played at funerals, weddings, and parties. Essentially, it is played at any occasion that called for an Ewe identity emblem, since this music is known by other ethnic groups to be uniquely Ewe. Everyone is welcome to join in the dance, unlike other Ewe dances, which sometimes are reserved for people of a certain age, religion, or gender. The dance is sometimes known as the “chicken dance” due to the bird-like motions required for the dance.

== Origin ==
Agbadza finds its origin in the times of war. The Ewe people went through various times of war and oppression before settling down in the Volta Region of Ghana and in Southern Togo. In order to train their warriors to be ready for battle, the Ewes used various songs and dances to encourage the warriors. Through this a dance called Atrikpui was born. This dance later evolved to Agbadza, which is no longer used for war but rather in events that are more joyful. Through Agbadza, at the time known as Atrikpui, Ewe singers and poets sang about battles, life and death, heroism, cowardice, migration, conquest, imperialism, and a warrior ethos. The move towards Agbadza was done due to a period of peace that was enjoyed by the Ewes around the 1920s, and so instead they decided to use some of their old songs as entertainment. Today, Agbadza is the most famous and widely played Ewe dance.

Drummers playing the Agbadza drum

== Instruments ==
Bell: It has a recurring phrase that establishes the tempo of the song and serves as a timeline for the rest of the ensemble.

Sogo: This is the ensemble leader drum. It indicates to the other drums what they are supposed to be playing. This drum also signals the dancers when they are supposed to be starting to dance, through the use of drumming language.

Kidi: This is the second drum in the ensemble. It communicates with the Sogo to create a conversation using drumming language.

Kagan: This is a support drum, which has a recurring rhythm throughout the performance that interacts with the bell to create a specific melody.

Rattle/ Axatse: This is a beaded-rattle that follows the rhythm of the timeline closely to complement the Agbadza song.

Handclaps: The handclaps in Agbadza are used to add human interaction to the song and create a dense musical texture of high energy.

== Song ==
The song is based on a call and responses system, which is widely present in the music of West Africa.

Call: Se Se Se Ioooo

Response: Aho Aho Ahoooo

Call: Se Se Se Iooo

Response: Aho Aho Ahoooo

ALL: Enyo o Egble o ahooo

Ne meku Agbadzawua nadim hee

Ne meku Agbadzawua nadim hee

Ne mekua Kiniwua nadi hee

Ne makua Kiniwua nadi hee
