= Ernest Papa Arko =

Ghanaian footballer (born 1984)

Personal information
- Date of birth: 12 May 1984 (age 42)
- Place of birth: Adawso, Ghana
- Height: 1.78 m (5 ft 10 in)
- Position: Striker

Youth career
- Ocean Stars

Senior career*
Years	Team	Apps	(Gls)
2002–2003	Liberty Professionals		
2004	→ El-Geish (loan)	5	(1)
2005–2012	El-Geish	118	(44)
2012	→ Al-Arabi (loan)	5	(1)
2012–2014	Smouha	27	(5)
2014–2015	Al Mokawloon	35	(11)
2015–2016	El-Entag El-Harby	22	(1)
2017–2020	Liberty Professionals	33	(3)

International career
- Ghana U-17
- Ghana U-20
2009	Ghana	1	(1)
- * Club domestic league appearances and goals

Ernest Papa Arko (born 12 May 1984) is a former Ghanaian football striker.

== Career ==
Arko used to play for Ocean Stars in Medina and was spotted by Sly Tetteh. He moved to play for Liberty Professionals and was offloaded to El Geish (aka |Army Stars). He was the leading striker of El Geish. From there, the loan was transferred into a permanent sale. He went on to become the leading scorer for Egyptian League.

== International career ==
He scored in his debut on 1 June 2009 against Uganda national football team and scores in his debut his first goal, formerly played for the U-17 & U-20 team.

=== International goals ===
Scores and results list Ghana's goal tally first.

No	Date	Venue	Opponent	Score	Result	Competition
1.	31 May 2009	Tamale Stadium, Tamale, Ghana	Uganda	1–0	2–1	Friendly
