= Atiavi =

Coordinates: 5°57′N 0°51′E

Anlo State
- Interactive map of Anlo State
- Country: Ghana
- Region: Volta Region

Atiavi is one of the thirty-six traditional states of Anlo State and a town in the Keta Municipal Assembly of the Volta Region of Ghana. The town is known for the Atiavi Easter Homecoming celebrations and the Atiavi Secondary Technical School. The school is a second cycle institution.
