= Mamfe Akuapem =

- Town
- Location of Mamfe in Eastern Region, Ghana
- Country: Ghana
- Region: Eastern Region
- District: Akuapim North District
- Time zone: GMT
  - Summer (DST): GMT

Mamfe is a town in the Akuapim North Municipal District of the Eastern Region of south Ghana. It shares borders with Amanokrom and Akropong.

== History ==
Mamfe is a town in the Akuapem State of Ghana. Mamfe connects all the 17 towns of Akuapem as well as having a road passing through it to Koforidua, the Eastern Regional capital.

The Mamfehene, Osabarima Ansah Sasraku II, doubles as the Kyidomhene of Akuapem. Mamfe has featured regularly in the government’s budget statements when reference is made to the Tetteh Quarshie-Madina- Pantang-Mamfe road project.

That portion of the road from Akuapem to Accra was in a deplorable state until the 2000s when the then government secured funding to fix the Pantang –Mamfe portion. The Tetteh Quarshie to Pantang portion is in an advanced state of rehabilitation now.

Mamfe is thus a very popular town in Ghana in terms of geographical location and its role in traditional governance.

On a sunny day in May 1983 a section of the youth of Mamfe-Akuapem in south-eastern Ghana – reeking heavily of alcohol and marijuana, armed with machetes and pick-axes and angrily singing war songs, drumming and dancing – went to the residence of Nana Ama Ansaa Sasraku II, their queen mother. Their mission was very simple. They were to inform her of their plans to demolish the billboard which welcomed motorists and visitors on their arrival in the town. According to them, the billboard was inhabited by an evil spirit responsible for the general incidence of unemployment and the absence of development in the town.

== Festival ==
In terms of festivals, Akuapems are noted for their Odwira and Ohum festivals. Although the Odwira festivals of the people of Akropong, Aburi and Larteh appears to be more popular, the Ohum festival also has its own attraction.

The chiefs and people of Mamfe, Mampong and Tutu, among other towns on the Akuapem Ridge, celebrate Ohum.

The people of Mamfe celebrate Ohum and this ceremony is usually held in November/December. Ohum is one of Ghana's many festivals that see attendance from people from all walks of life including the diaspora.

Every year, the people of Mamfe celebrate the Ohum festival in December or January depending on the calculation of the traditional calendar (Akwasidae).

== Education ==
Methodist Girls Senior High, Mamfe was established in 1984 as a private institution called Mamfe State College. However, due to financial, administrative and staffing problems, in 1988 the school was handed over to the Methodist Church Ghana, as a result it was renamed to Methodist High School. Government absorbed the school into the public system in January 1993. A Deputy Minister of Education in charge of General Education, Dr. Yaw Osei Adutwum, who announced this at a durbar at Mamfe to honour the 10 students and their coordinators, said the performance had brought honour, not only to the Mamfe community, the Akuapem Traditional area and the Akuapem North Municipal Assembly, but the Eastern Region and the country at large.
