= Obosomase Akuapem =

Town in Eastern Region, Ghana

Obosomase
- Town
- Location within Ghana
- Coordinates: 5°52′30.4″N 0°09′25.4″W
- Country: Ghana
- Region: Eastern Region
- District: Akuapim South Municipal
- Time zone: GMT
  - Summer (DST): GMT

Obosomase is a town in the Akuapem North Municipal District of the Eastern Region of Ghana. With an average elevation of 1,414 to 1,575 feet above sea level, it is known for its cool to chilly weather pattern. It sits on the Akwapim-Togo Range. The town shares borders with Tutu and Ahwerase. Some tourist sites in the town includes; Holyland City and Adom Waterfalls. Some accommodations in the town includes; Bribong Suite, Mount Pleasant Inns & Apartment, Nature's Cradle Garden Lounge and Holyland City.

== Notable places ==
- Adom Waterfalls
