= Okere District =

- District
- Districts of Eastern Region

- Location of Okere District within Eastern
- Coordinates: 6°4′43.68″N 0°1′2.28″W
- Country: Ghana
- Region: Eastern
- Capital: Adukrom

Population (2021)
  - Total: 51,675
- Time zone: UTC+0 (GMT)

Okere District is one of the thirty-three districts in Eastern Region, Ghana. Originally it was formerly part of the then-larger Akuapim North District in 1988, which was created from the former Akuapim District Council, until it was elevated to municipal district assembly status on 15 March 2012 to become Akuapim North Municipal District.

However, on 15 March 2018, the northeast part of the district was split off to create Okere District; the remaining part was retained as Akuapim North Municipal District when the Legislative Instrument (L.I) 2342 in 2017 in pursuance to the Government's Decentralization Policy and Local Government Reform Policy was implemented to split off Okere District from Akuapim North Municipal District. The municipality is located in the southeast part of Eastern Region of the Republic of Ghana, and has Adukrom as its capital town.

The most common language spoken here is Gwan.

== District chief executives ==
On September 27, 2021, Daniel Kenneth was appointed as the DCE of Okere District.

On May 14, 2025, Eric William Ayettey was appointed by President John Mahama to lead Okere District as its new district chief executive. The confirmation, which was supervised by the Electoral Commission of Ghana, saw that Ayettey had 26 votes in favour of his appointment.

== List of settlements ==
Settlements of Okere District
| No. | Settlement | Population (2021) |
|---|---|---|
| 1 | Abiriw | 6,870 |
| 2 | Adukrom | 10,977 |
| 3 | Dawu | 3,735 |
| 4 | Awukugua | 4,153 |
| 5 | Apirede | 3,799 |
| 6 | Aseseeso | 2,047 |
| 7 | Abonse | 2,111 |
| 8 | Asenema | 2,258 |
| 9 | Okra Kwadwo | 2,774 |
| 10 | Amanfro | 2,556 |

== Towns ==
The Traditional Area of seven main towns is Abiriw, Dawu, Awukugua, Adukrom, Apirede, Aseseeso and Abonse, and over one hundred and fifty smaller towns and villages.

The language spoken amongst the indigenes of the area is Kyerepon.

== Geographical location ==
The district can be found on the Akuapem Ridge located in the south eastern part of the Eastern Region, about 68km from Accra. It shares boundaries with Akuapem North Municipal Assembly to the south and Yilo Krobo Municipal Assembly to the east.
