= Amanokrom =

Amanokrom Akuapem
- Town
- Location of Amanokrom in Eastern Region, Ghana
- Country: Ghana
- Region: Eastern Region
- District: Akuapim North Municipal District
- Time zone: GMT
  - Summer (DST): GMT
- Website: amanokrom.com

Amanokrom is a town in the Akuapim North District of the Eastern Region of Ghana. It shares border with Mamfe and Abotakyi.

== History ==
Àmanokrom, one of the principal Twi speaking towns in Akuapem, was established around 1742 by Nana Amanor Awuah of the Asona clan whose predecessors accompanied their relative King Safori to establish the Ofori stool dynasty and the Akuapem State after the Akuapem War of Independence against the Akwamus in 1733.

Nana Amanor Awuah whose name was given to the new town Amanokrom (Amanor's town) was a descendant of Nana Ahenkorakese, an Asona chief of Adanse Kokobiante and of common ancestry with King Kuntunkununku. The first King of the Asona group of people then at Adanse Kokobiante in Ashanti.

The Asona of the Ahenkorakese group led by Nana Agyapon Tenten first settled at Adanse Ofoase and moved with Ofori Panyin of Akyem Abuakwa to Pamen in Eastern Akyem Abuakwa before moving again with King Safori to establish the next Ofori Kuma dynasty of Akuapem around 1733.

Nana Kwatia Akompi led the Ahenkorakesee Asona group from Pamen to Akuapem where they stayed with Omanhene Safori at Amanprobi near Akropong. Nana Kwatia Akompi died At Amanprobi and was succeeded by Nana Osim Kwatia who led the Ahenkorakese Asona group to accompany King Safori to move from Amanprobi to Nsorem, between Akropong and Abiriw. After the death of Osim Kwatia, Amanor Awuah succeeded to the leadership of the Ahenkorakese Asona group till about 1740.

At that time, the traditional administration of Akuapem was being run by Ofei Boa as a Regent. It is reported that during an Ohum festival around 1740, Nana Amanor Awuah had a misunderstanding with Ofei Boa over the ownership of some palm wine which resulted in Nana Amanor Awuah and his people moving from Akropong with the intention of returning to Akim Abuakwa. Their first stop was Adesaaae and later Odumase near Dodowa.

A professional hunter, Amanor Awuah, had earlier discovered the Dodowa area as a good hunting ground where he had a chance meeting with a fellow hunter, Konton Mensah, a native of Akwamu who had taken refuge in that area after the Akuapem-Akwamu war of 1733.

== Festival ==
The people of Amanokrom celebrate Odwira and this ceremony is usually held in September/October. Odwira is one of Ghana's many festivals that see attendance from people from all walks of life including the diaspora.

For many decades, the Odwira festival has been a staple of Ghana's diverse cultural expression, bringing together people to celebrate themes of victory, gratitude and harvest, in unity. However, even before Odwira became a part of Ghana's cultural landscape it had long been celebrated by the people of Akropong, Amanokrom and Aburi in the Eastern Region.

== See also ==
- Emmanuel Noi Omaboe
