= Larteh Akuapem =

Town in Eastern Region, Ghana

Of the populated places in the Eastern region of Ghana, Larteh Akuapem is the capital of the Benkum Division of the Akuapem Traditional Council. It lies on the east of the ridge on the Akonnobepow.

== History ==
The name Larteh was derived from the GA words "La" which means fire, and "te" which means stone. In English meaning "fire-stone".

The Benkum Division of Akuapem comprises the following towns and their villages; Larteh, Mamfe, Abotakyi, Mampong, Tutu, Obosomase, Mangoase, Tinkong, Okroase, Adweso. The towns of Akuapem are in the Eastern Region of Ghana and situated between longitude 0°15 W - 0°00 and latitude 5°45 - 6°00 N. These towns are located on the Akuapem Ridge, which runs northeastwards across the Volta Region of Ghana and extends further into the Republic of Togo.

Larteh is a twin town consisting of Larteh Kubease and Larteh Ahenease. The language spoken is Guan which is a stock of the Kwa.

The oral tradition of Larteh Kubease claims that they came from inland and settled west of the mouth of the Volta among the Kpesi, aborigines of Guan extraction. When the Ga Boni met them, the two groups settled temporally on the banks of the Laloi Lagoon at Podoku near Tema. Larteh Kubease were led by Fianko Adeyite. On the hills they first settled at a place called Afianko. The Afianko sojourn seems to have been the briefest, since no living structures were created there. They moved to present Larteh Kubease.

== Festival ==
The people of Larteh celebrate Odwira and this ceremony is usually held in September/October. Odwira is one of Ghana's many festivals that see attendance from people from all walks of life including the diaspora.

Like all traditional festivals in Ghana, Odwira of Larteh and Akuapem are a combination of ritual, ceremonial, artistic, and recreational activities which take place in different locations according to defined schedules and forms. The festivals also provide opportunities for the collective renewal of the arts as a form of community experience, or as an expression of group consciousness with a great deal of stress laid on music and dancing in many of the festival events.

For many decades, the Odwira festival has been a staple of Ghana's colourful, vibrant and diverse cultural expression, bringing together people from all walks of life to celebrate themes of victory, gratitude and harvest, in unity. However, even before Odwira became a part of Ghana's cultural landscape it had long been celebrated by the people of Akropong, Amanokrom and Aburi in the Eastern Region.

== Notable personalities ==
Larteh is the birthplace of, or home to, several notable people, including:

- Matilda J. Clerk - Ghanaian medical pioneer and science educator
- Theodore S. Clerk - Ghanaian urban planner and architectural pioneer

== See also ==
- Akonnedi Shrine
