= Ohum Festival =

Festival in Ghana

The Ohum Festival is a traditional festival celebrated by Akuapem and Akyem in the Eastern Region of Ghana. It is celebrated on a Tuesday or Wednesday in September or October and in June or July depending on several traditional factors.

The festival is celebrated by the Akyems and Akuapem people. Prior to the celebration, a two week ban on noise-making is imposed.

The festival serves both as a cultural celebration and as a way to thank God for the yam harvest and seek his favour for the coming year. The Akyems thank their creator for blessing their land with the Birim river. They use products from their lands and the river as symbols to remember their ancestors who struggled and persevered in keeping their society intact. The people give pledges to continue the tradition and to keep their kingdom strong and free with prosperity and peace during the festival. They pledge allegiance to their king the Okyenhene and his sub-chiefs and elders for their leadership and guidance.

== History behind the ohum festival ==
The Ohum festival which is celebrated in two times annually, that is Ohumkan (first ohum) celebrated around June and July whiles Ohumkyire (second ohum) celebrated around is b September and October is believed to have three main parts. the first part is the mythical appearance of Chief Okuru Banni 1 and his men from the river Birim and their migration from there to their present day settlement. they also use this opportunity to celebrate and mourn their present and past leaders respectively. the second aspect is to give thanks to their river god, Agyempremu Kofi who is believed to be the protector of the people of Tafo (custodians of ohum) and its environs. the third aspect is the ushering and lunching of the new year and the consumption of new yam.

== Activities that mark the ohum celebration ==
The festivals commences after a two weeks ban on noise making. After which a journey led by the priest and other traditional leaders is taken to the Gyempremo shrine at old Tafo to perform rituals and sacrifices in honour of their deity. A legend associated with the shrine suggests that, anyone who trips and falls on the return from the shrine will not live to see the next year. on their visit to the shrine, the people of Okyeman dress in traditional to symbolise respect and connection to their heritage. some of the things offered to the gods include foods and drinks, these items are believed to strengthen the bond between the living and the ancestral spirits which ensures prosperity and protection for the community. The spiritual leader invokes the gods through prayers, chants and sometimes singing, drumming and other forms of music.

Two weeks after the rituals, the Akyem people hoot at hunger, something the Ga people also do. It symbolises the rejection of hunger and the celebration of abundance of harvest the people of Akyem Abuakwa pride themselves as leading producers of yam yam during the times of old. During the durbar, a procession which includes drumming, dancing and singing is held to celebrate abundance of food and life, different yam dishes are prepared and shared among the people. the people also pledge to continue the tradition passed down by their ancestors . Along with the drumming and dancing, various dignitaries grace the occasion by paying courtesy calls to the Okeyman. As part of the many activities held, the people also hold a beauty pageant known as the Miss ohum beauty pageant.

== History of various communities under the Akyem/Akuapem traditional area that celebrate ohum ==
BEREKUSO

Berekuso is located in the Akuapem south district, surrounded by mountains and is a border town between Greater Accra and the Eastern region. Up until the 17th century, the people Berekuso celebrated the Odwira festival but changed to the ohum after their chief, Nana Dartey Kofi changed the customs. Despite Berekuso position as an integral part of the Akuapem state, the people of Berekuso were originally from Twifo Hemang in present day central region. After many stops, they made their way to present day Berekuso under the leadership of their chief Nana Adu Mireku in 1420 near the river Boade which later became their source of drinking water. The river was discovered by Amoa Gyan, son of Nana Oteng Korankeye the first.

== Gallery ==
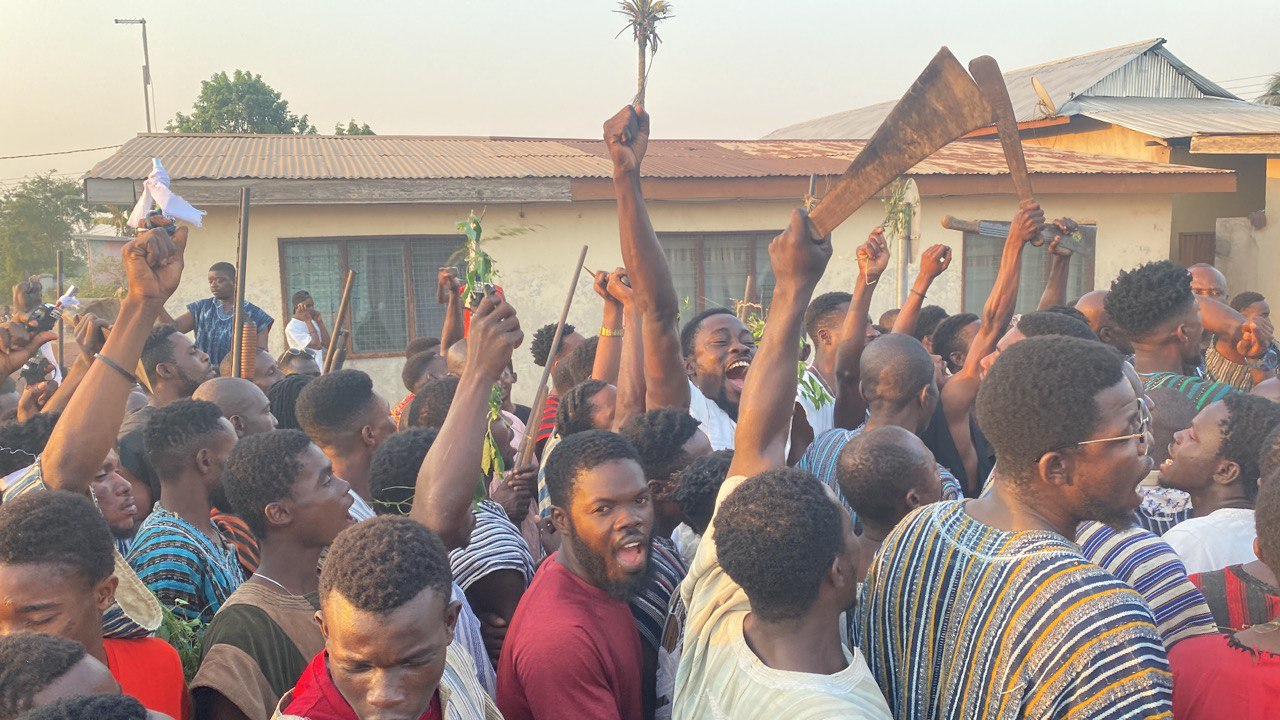

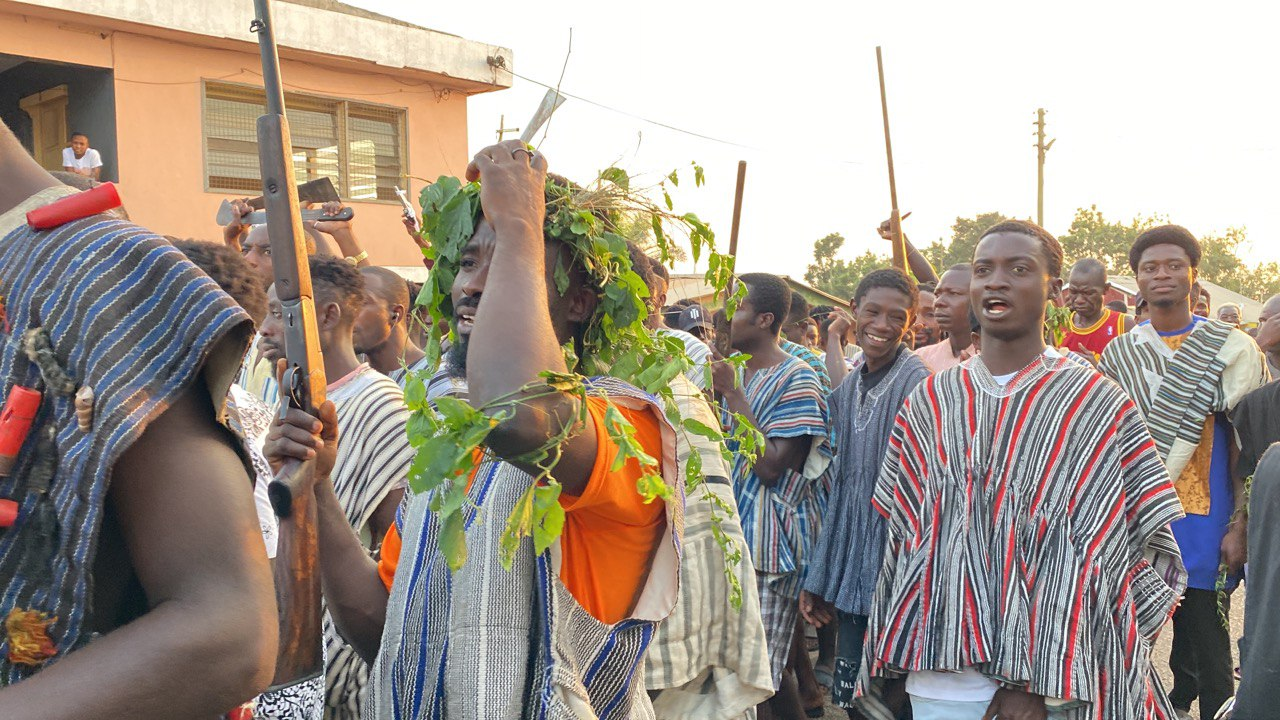

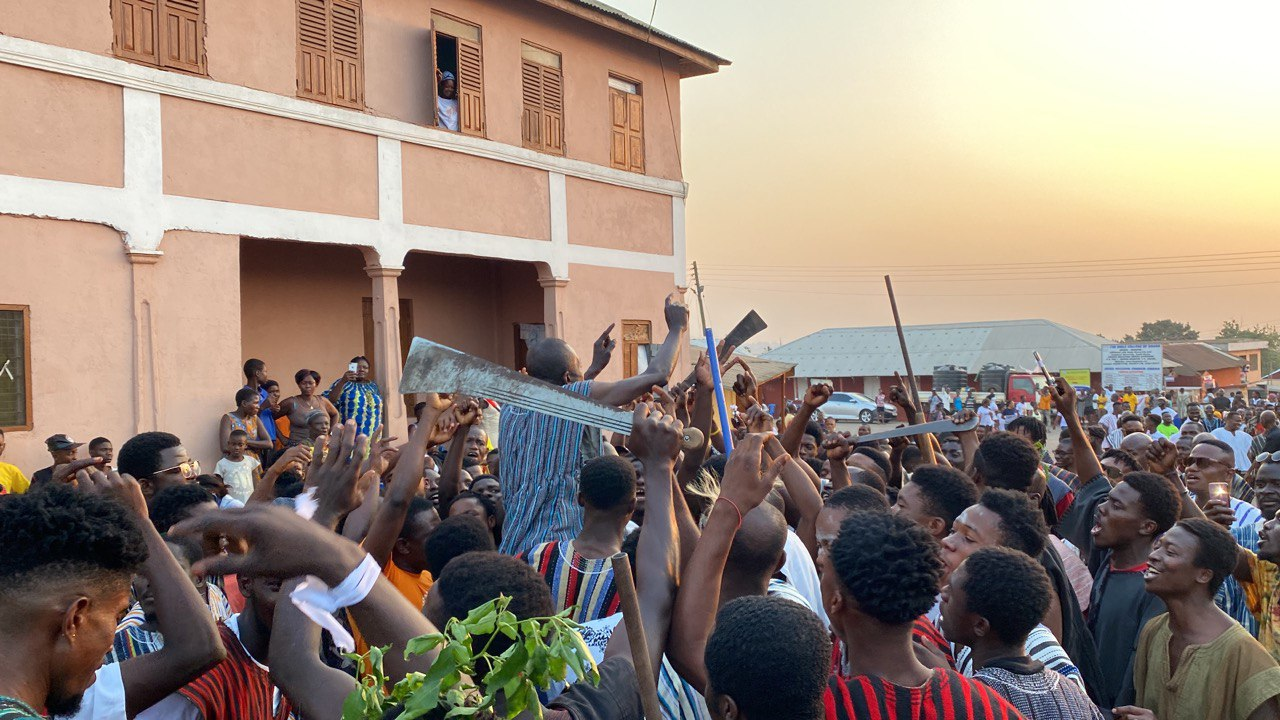

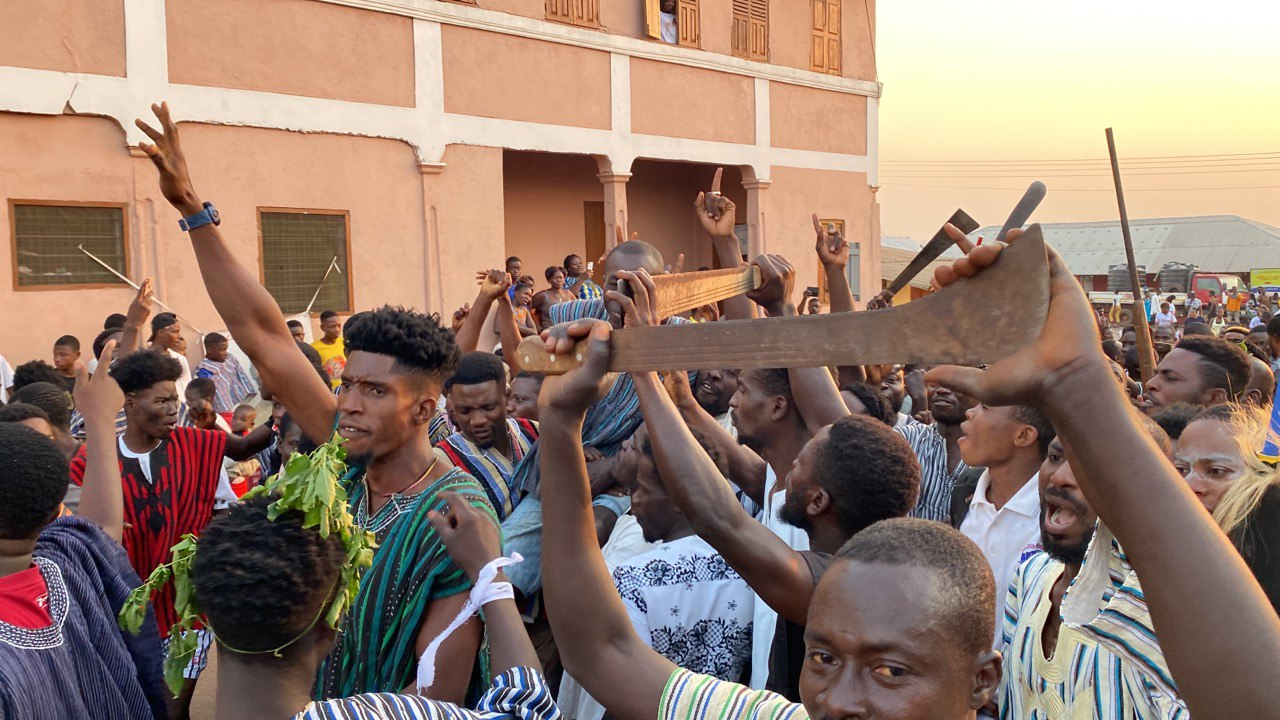

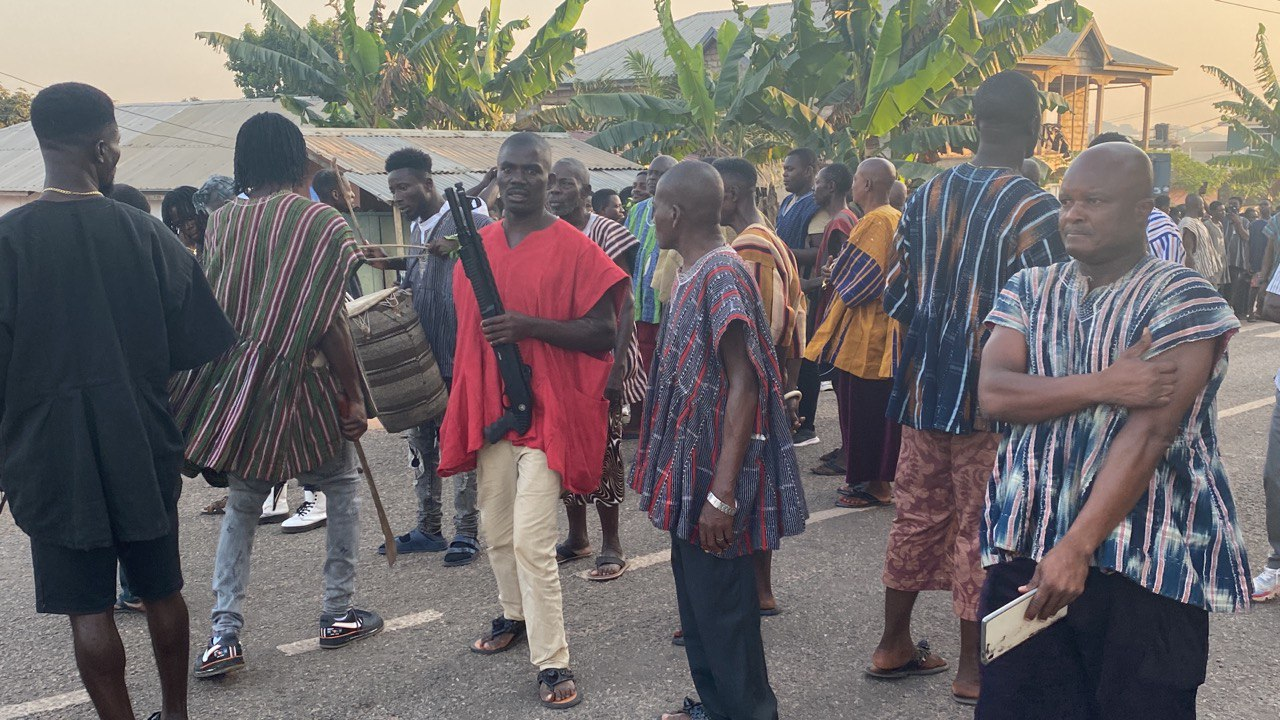

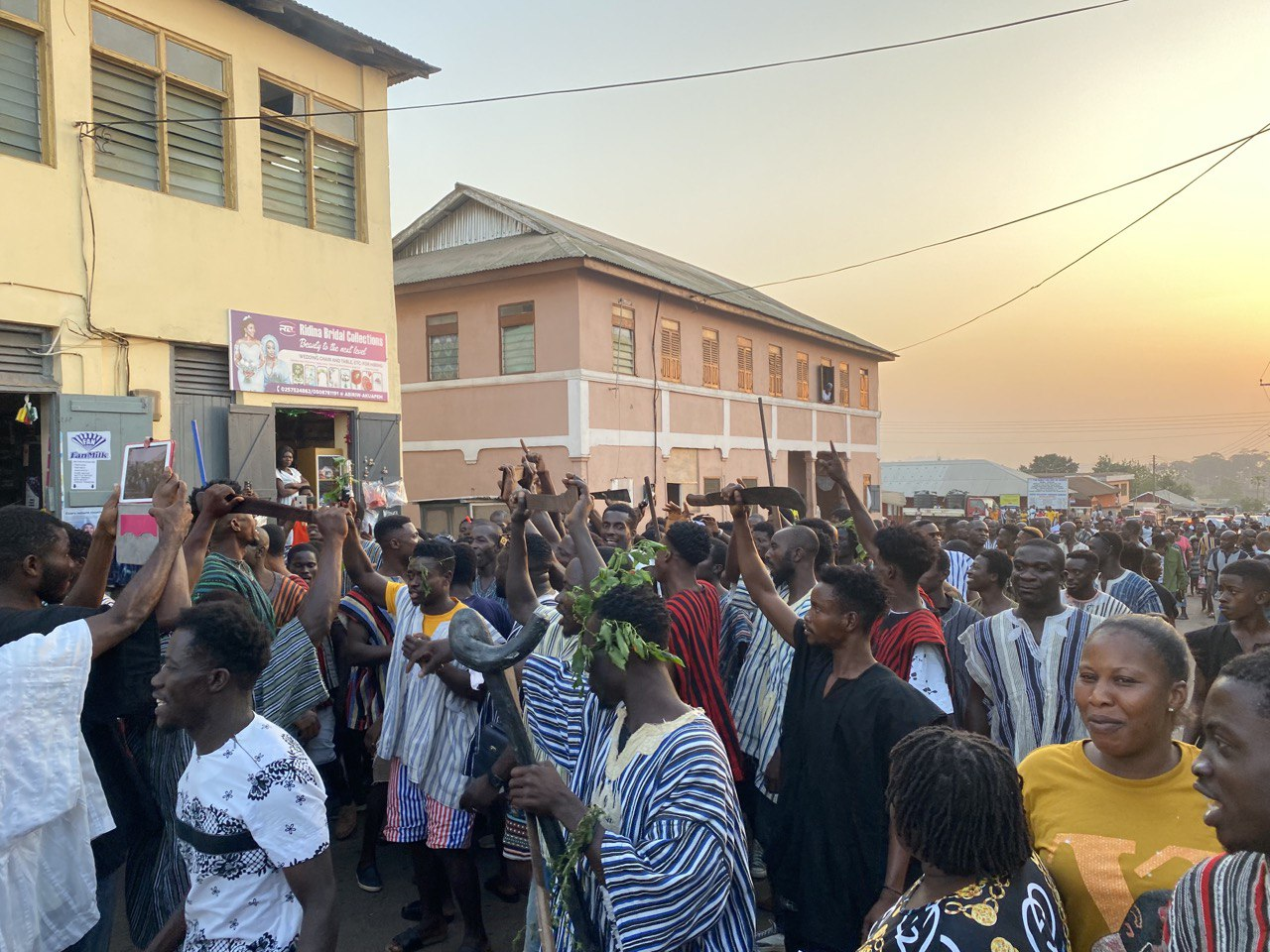
