= Hogbetsotso festival =

Festival in Ghana by the Anlos

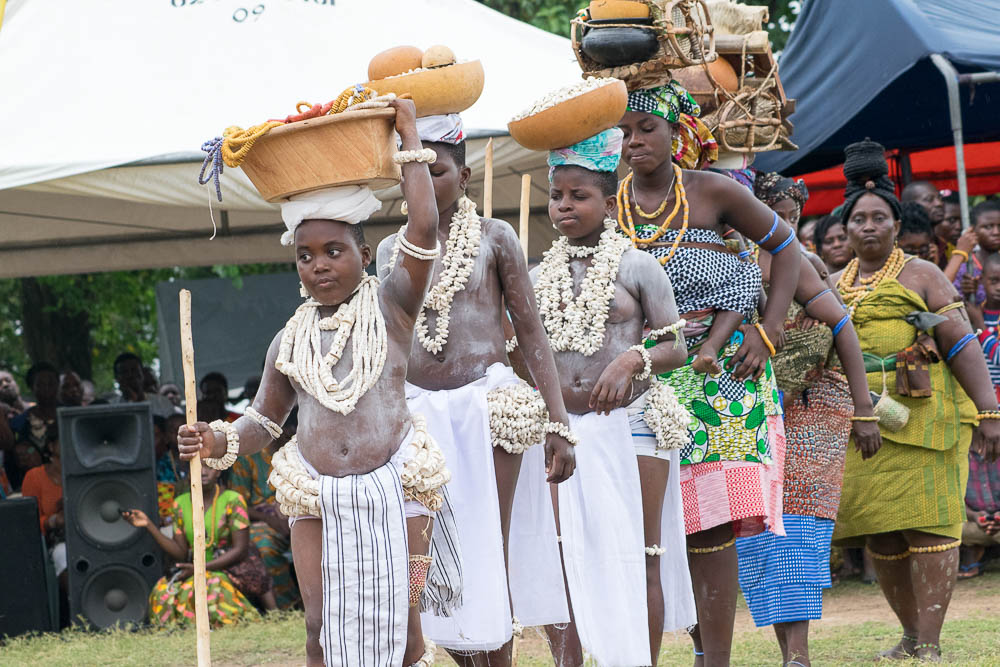
Hogbetsotso festival

The Hogbetsotso festival (pronounced Hogbechocho) is celebrated by the chiefs and people of Anlo in the Volta Region of Ghana. Some major Anlo towns include Anloga (capital), Keta, Kedzi, Vodza, Whuti, Srogboe, Woe, Tegbi, Dzita, Abor, Anlo Afiadenyigba, Anyako, Konu, Alakple, Atsito, Atiavi, Deʋegodo, Atorkor, Tsiame and many other villages. The festival is celebrated annually on the first Saturday in the month of November at Anloga, the customary and ritual capital of the Anlo state. The name of the festival is derived from the Ewe language and translates as the festival of exodus. or "coming from Hogbe (Notsie)". The celebration of the festival was instituted about four decades ago.

== History ==
The Anlo is a group of people from a tribe on the eastern coast of Ghana. Prior to their settling in their present location, they lived in Notsie, a town in present-day Togo. It is believed that they had migrated from southern Sudan through Oyo, an area in Nigeria, Ketou in Benin and Adja Tado in Togo to settle in Notsie. Oral tradition has it that they lived under a wicked king, Togbe Agorkoli (Agor Akorli). In order to escape his tyrannical rule they had to create a hole in the earthen wall that surrounded their town. They achieved this by instructing the women to pour all their wastewater at one particular place in the wall. Over time the spot became soft, thereby allowing the town people to break through the wall and escape through the resulting mud. Tradition also holds that, to confuse their pursuers, buying time to make good their escape, they walked backwards with their faces towards the town so that their footprints appeared to going into the town.

== The festival ==
The festival is traditionally observed on the first Saturday in November (every year), featuring various ceremonies. These ceremonies encompass a peace-making period during which all disputes are resolved through amicable solutions. It is believed that the reason for this traditional period of peacemaking is that the people believe their ancestors lived in harmony with themselves all through their escape from Notsie and that it was this character that made their sojourn a success. There is also a purification ceremony of the ceremonial stools (where the Ewe believe the ancestral spirits reside) through the pouring of libations. This is followed by general cleaning where all the villages are swept and rubbish burnt. This cleaning ceremony starts at the Volta River and ends after several days at the Mono River in the Republic of Togo. The climax of the festival involves a durbar of the chiefs and people of Anlo. The chiefs dress in colourful regalia / kente, and receive homage from their subjects at the durbar grounds. Various forms of dancing, singing and merry-making characterize the entire festival.

=== Celebrations ===
==== 2019 ====
The 2019 Hogbetsotso festival was attended by some dignitaries including two Ghanaian Ex-Presidents, Jerry John Rawlings, and John Dramani Mahama. The 2019 festival was with the theme, "Uniting Anlo through its value for the benefits of its citizens and the nation at large".

==== 2022 ====
The 2022 festival marked the 60th anniversary celebration of the event. It was held with the theme, "60 years of Anlo Hogbetsotso Za: Uniting for development, Sustaining our Unique Cultural Commonwealth for Future Generations." The grand durbar at Hogbe Park in Anloga was attended by notable figures, including Vice-President Dr. Mahamudu Bawumia, Asantehene Otumfuo Osei Tutu II, Kwahumanhene Daasebre Akuamoah Agyapong II, and Ga Mantse King Tackie Teiko Tsuru II.

== The Agbadza ==
The Agbadza, originally a war dance in imitation of birds in flight and formerly known as atrikpui, is the traditional dance of the people of Anlo which is performed vigorously during the grand durbar of the Hogbetsotso festival. It is a way of expressing joy to their ancestors and gods. Agbadza can be performed anywhere, at parties, funerals and at naming ceremonies. In this modern age, anyone from any tribe can perform the Agbadza dance regardless. Another example of Ewe dances is the borborbor dance.
