= Ahobaa Festival =

Festival in Ghana by the people of Enyan-Kakraba

Ahobaa Festival is an annual festival celebrated by the chiefs and peoples of Enyan-Kakraba near Saltpond in the Central Region of Ghana. It is usually celebrated in the month of June.

== Celebrations ==
During the festival, visitors are welcomed to share food and drinks. The people put on traditional clothes and there is durbar of chiefs. There is also dancing and drumming.

== Significance ==
This festival is celebrated to obtain the benediction of their ancestors.
