= Apoo festival =

Festival in Ghana by the people of Techiman

The Apoo Festival is a festival celebrated annually in western Ghana (specifically the towns of Techiman and Wenchi), lasting a week in March and April. The festival is meant to ritually purify the people of social evils, as well as uniting people and families, and includes a variety of other traditional cultural activities. The word 'apoo' comes from the root word 'po', meaning 'to reject.'

The festival is heavily associated with the Bono people. Not only is it held in Techiman, one of the most important cities to the Bono people and kingdom, insults, proverbs, maxims, songs, and historical recountings of the Bono Kingdom are exchanged during the titular Apoo procession; many of these insults, proverbs, and songs are directed towards the Ashanti, who conquered the Bono Empire.

== History ==
Oral tradition holds that the festival began under the reign of Nana Kwakye Ameyaw; he was an authoritarian leader, and the people of Techniman subsequently could not freely express their views. Since they couldn't hold the authorities accountable, they consulted the local gods. They were asked to set aside some of their days to go out and express their sentiments, especially towards the authorities. During this period, it was agreed that one couldn't be held responsible for what he or she said, regardless of status. The people would say “Mereko po me haw”, which literally meant “I am going to say what was on my chest”, and this was how the “Apoo” festival came to be.

== Traditions ==
It's believed that through the airing of grievances and grudges, the people and their souls are ritually purified of evil. In preparation for the Apoo festival and this purification, women will clean homes, utensils, and roads to avoid such evils from returning. Priests in the area will also parade the streets before the festival to spiritually destroy malicious charms hidden by evil spirits; this process is called 'Nnusin-tuo.'

Another important preliminary tradition is 'Hyereko', literally meaning 'the collection of white clay.' White clay is collected by women from the Aponkosu River and is used to decorate the local shrines before the Apoo festival begins. Priests and priestesses will also use the clay on their bodies when being possessed by/communing with the spirits.

Drums are beaten to alert people of the festival's beginning. The Apoo procession is led by the Paramount Chief, village elders, secondary chiefs, and court. During the 'Apoo' procession, grievances are aired and insinuations are cast on the wrongdoings of others. Even the chief is not exempt from this disparagement. People are encouraged to settle family feuds during this time, and it is a time for reconciliation.

Early in the festival, the procession goes to the grave of the last Bonohene, the traditional leader of the Bono people. The Paramount Chief and village elders congregate around the grave as the Chief offers up sheep and pours libations. The rest of the procession remains outside until the rites are complete. The 'banmuhene', custodian of the Royal Graveyard, prepares a dish of oiled, mashed-up yam, seasoned with condiments called 'eto'; this dish is then offered to the ancestral spirits. The secondary chiefs pour further libations on the stools present on the grave while the banmuhene asks the ancestral spirits for prosperity and peace. Then, the sheep is slaughtered and its blood drained into a bowl. The entrails of the sheep are placed on the grave, while servants prepare and cook the rest of the sheep for the elders. The townsfolk outside are also offered eto. Other chiefs continue to pour more libations, thanking the ancestral spirits and naming them one by one; they ask for continued blessings while cursing those who wish them ill. Afterwards, priests and priestesses will drum and dance in the graveyard as the crowd sings.

The following days of the festival are filled with festivities from dusk to dawn. Families will also spend the Apoo Festival hosting their kinsmen and guests, spending lavishly on food and entertainment for their visitors.

Dancing is an important part of the Apoo Festival. Priests and priestesses will dress in raffia skirts called 'doso', adorned with talismans and charms, and their bodies are painted with the white clay collected earlier. Before dancing, the priests and priestesses will make an incantation to drive away evil spirits. Some dance holding swords in their hands, while others perform rituals communicating with the spirits as they dance.

On the Great Apoo Friday, elderly women will get up at dawn, parading through the streets as they shake rattles and sing traditional Apoo songs; this singing is nicknamed 'akokobonee' or 'cock-crowing.' On this day, people from all of the outlying villages will come to town to participate in the festivities. Men and women dress in all manner of clothes, with the festival being noted for its flamboyant and unusual outfits. The members of the procession are also smeared with charcoal, white clay, and red clay. Drums, gongs, and rattles are all played during the procession.

After parading all over the town, the spectators eventually converge in front of the 'ahenfie', or palace. The Paramount Chief will take his seat, followed by the secondary chiefs, and the rest of his court and attendants. After taking their places, greetings are exchanged and refreshments are served to everyone. The Paramount Chief will give a speech on the Apoo Festival's importance and gives thanks to the ancestral spirits.

At the end of the festival, the High Priest leads the procession to the ahenfie and gives a speech formally concluding the festival. The procession is then led to the riverside, where the priests and elders will perform customary rites. Riverwater is mixed with white clay and adwera leaves, and this water is sprinkled on the shrines and people using somme leaves. The shrines return to their sacred grove, and the people return to town, singing Apoo songs.
