= Kundum Festival =

Festival in Ghana by the people Nzema and Ahanta

The Kundum festival is celebrated by the Ahanta and Nzema people of the Western region of Ghana. It is celebrated to thank God for the abundance of food at the time of the harvest period of the area.

== History ==
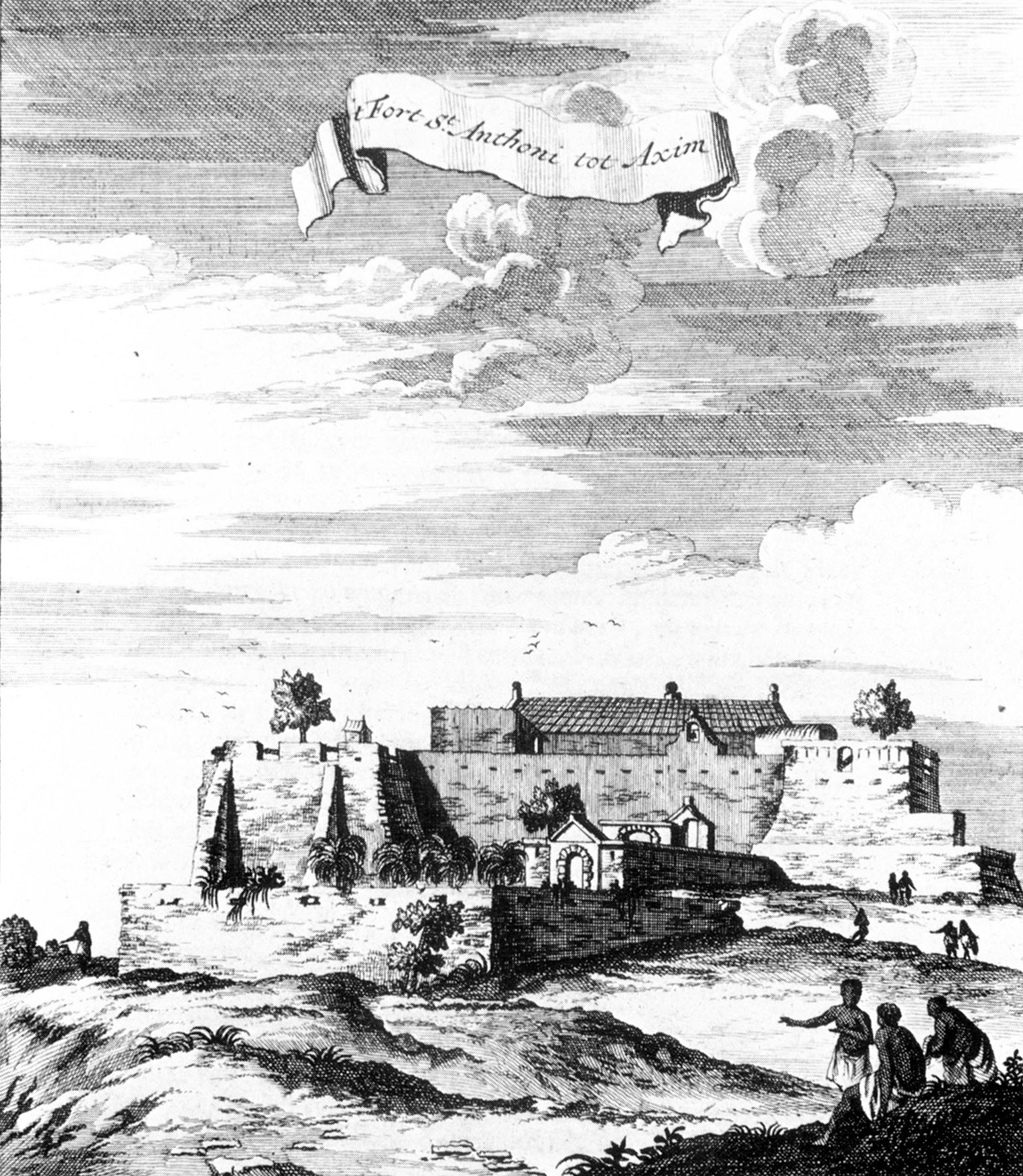
lithograph of a castle in Axim

One of the earliest written records of the festival was made by Bosman, a Dutch explorer who traveled to the Gold Coast in the 17th century and observed the festival.

== Origin ==
According to oral history and folklore, the festival began when a hunter, Akpoley, during an expedition, chanced upon some dwarves dancing in a circle. After observing the dance, he returned to his town and introduced it to his people. The ritual dancing is associated with expelling the devil and evil spirits from towns and villages. During the festival, the dance is performed by most inhabitants of Axim and surrounding towns. It comes from the Nzema people and subsequently graduated to the Ahantas in the Western region of Ghana.

== Festival type ==
Kundum is both a harvest and religious festival. The start of the festival is based on the day the fruit of a certain palm tree became ripe.

== The celebration ==
The festival lasts for four weeks, but for the first three weeks most activity, particularly drumming and dancing only takes place at night and on the outskirts of the towns at a place known as Siedu or Sienu. The festivals occur separately in each town that make up the Ahanta and Nzema paramountcy. The towns each schedule independently on which Sunday their local festival will start.

The celebration consists of three main components:

- dancing
- drumming
- feast

=== Festival attire ===
The people who participate in the celebration wear distinctive dress, footwear, and sometimes masks. The festival begins by musicians taking the drums to the five different shrines on outskirts of town. At the shrines, requests for the good of the town made, and rum is poured on the ground as libation.

== Gallery ==
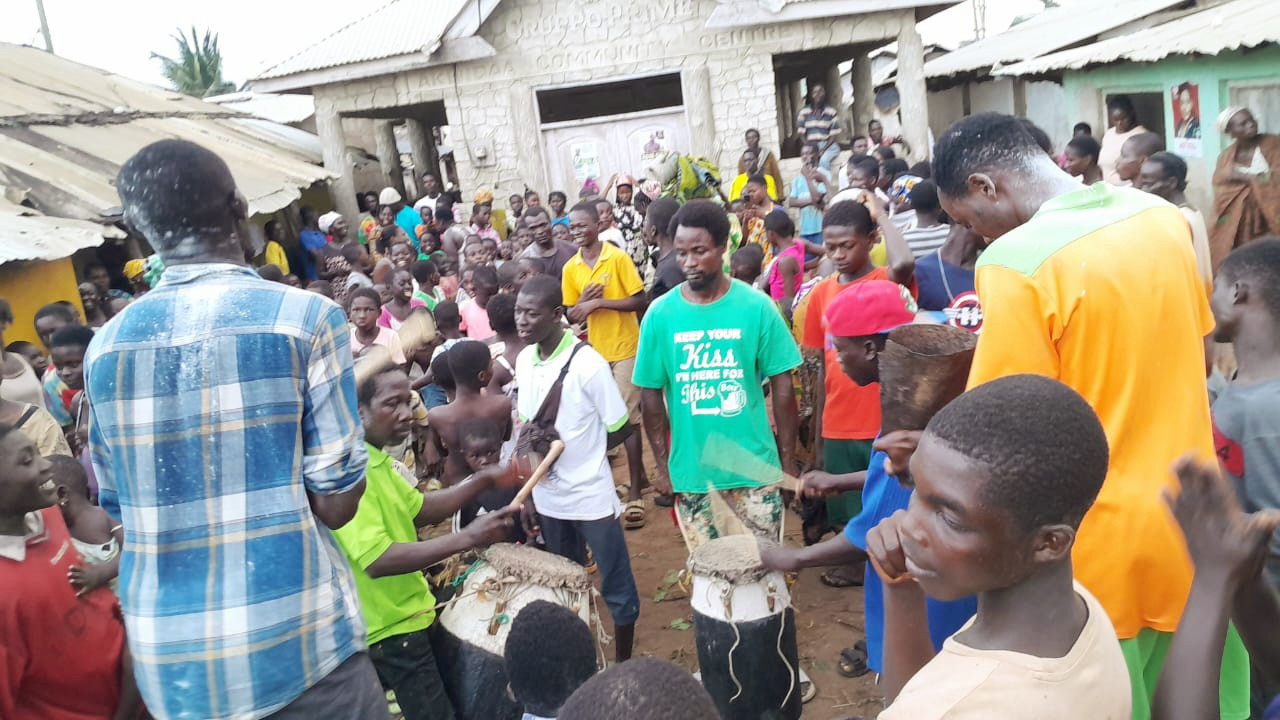
Huge gatherings at the festival

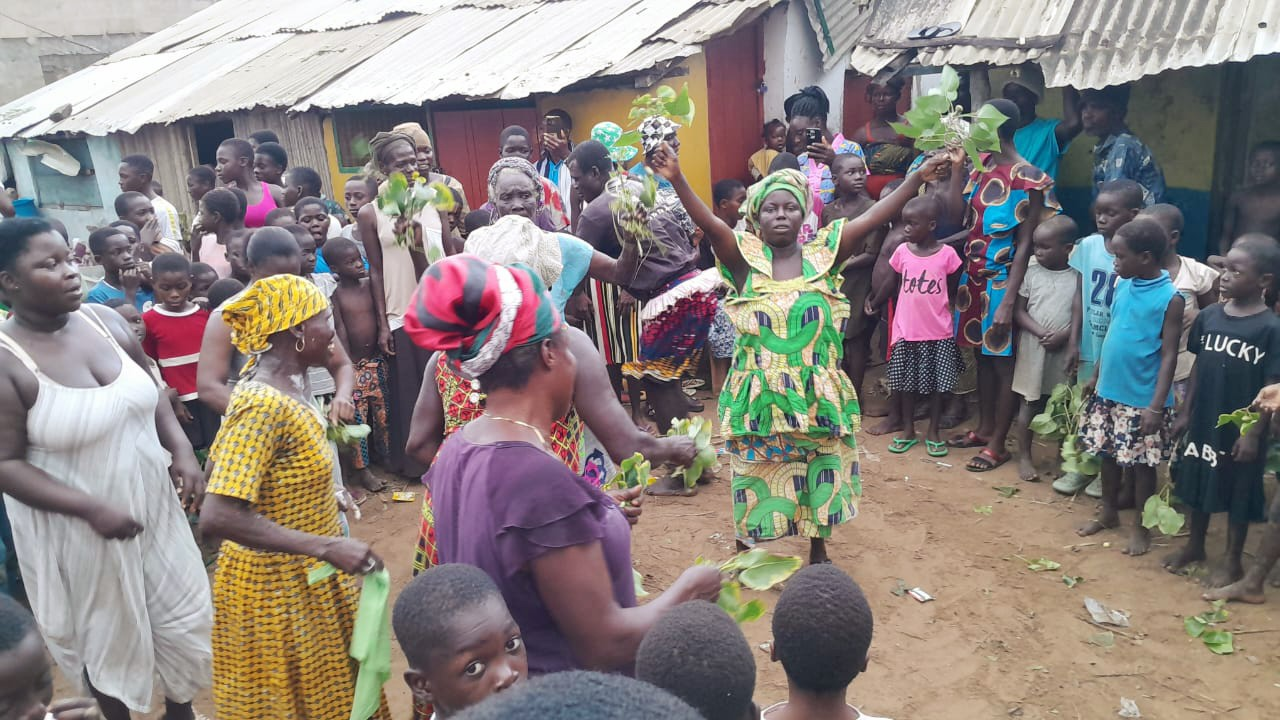
An old woman performing a traditional dance

== Programme of activities ==
In the traditional four-week celebration, the drummers will spend the next three weeks in the outskirts practicing and preparing for the fourth week. No drumming or dancing is done on the Monday of the fourth and final week. The ritual Kundum fire is lit at the chief’s palace and is kept burning throughout the festivities. The fire serves as a center of activity and heat source for preparing the main festival meal.

On Tuesday, sacrifices of fowl or sheep are offered in the stool room. The stool room is a sacred palace where the stools of departed chiefs and elders are kept. All of the sacrifices in the stool room are performed privately by a small designated group. Finally a public sacrifice of a fowl is performed in the courtyard. Singing begins on Tuesday and on Wednesday, the chief joins festivities. He enters on a palanquin accompanied by a parade of people singing and drumming.

Each night the people eat a large meal together, culminating in a great feast of the final Sunday. All the food is collectively prepared by the women using the Kundum fire, and they are directed by the elder women. The remainder of the week is spent performing the ritualized Kundum dancing. Some dances are performed by men and others by women; others are not distinguished by gender requirements. The dancing concludes in front of the castle in Axim. The traditional purpose of the dancing is to drive the evil spirits and devils from the town and preserve another successful year.
