= Aboakyer festival =

Festival of the people of Winneba

The Aboakyer festival is a deer hunting festival celebrated by the people of Winneba in the Central Region of Ghana.

== Overview ==
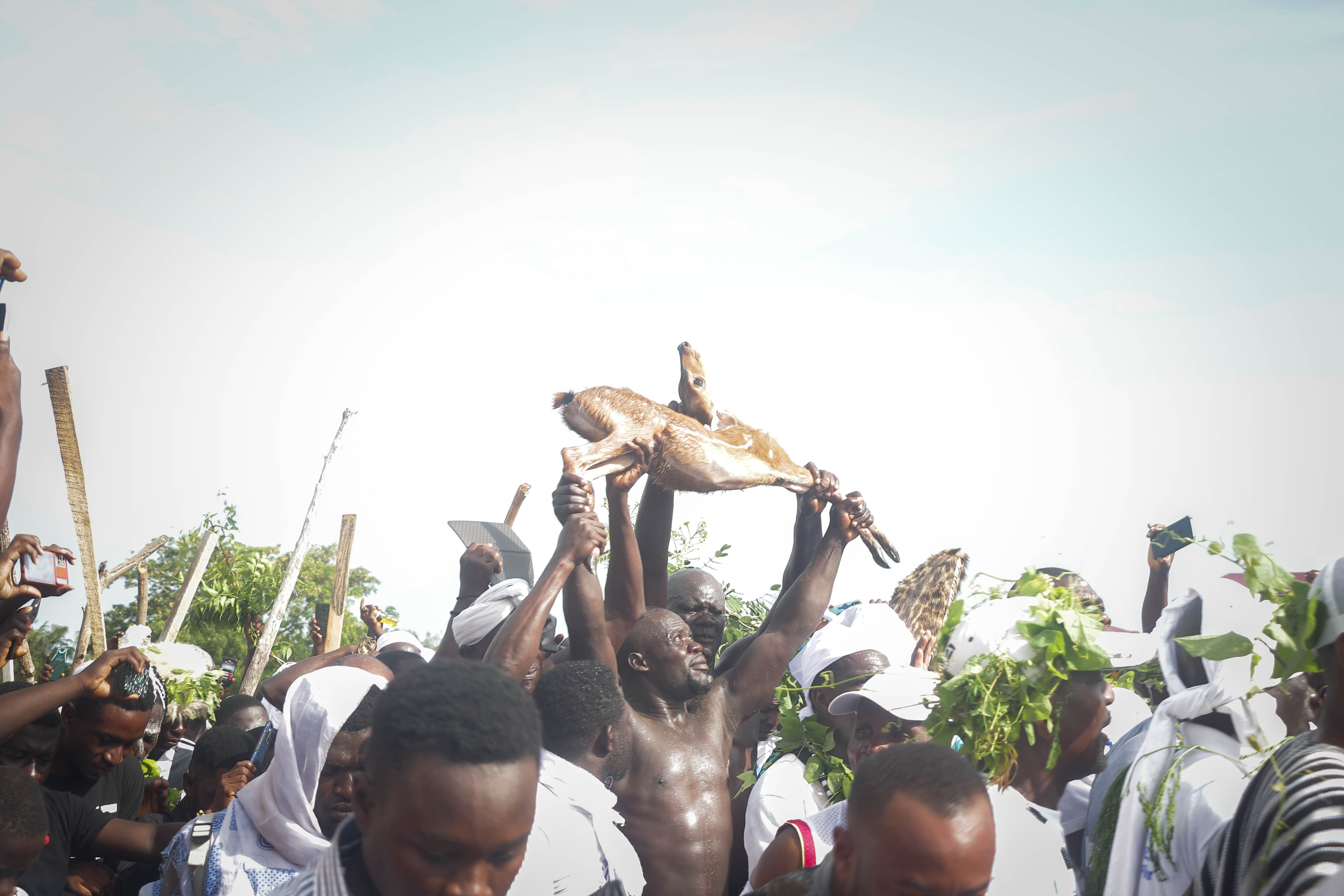
These men catches deer to celebrate Aboakyer festival in Ghana

The name Aboakyer translates as "hunting for game or animal" in the Fante language as spoken by the people of the Central Region. The institution of the festival was to commemorate the migration of Simpafo (traditional name given to the people of Winneba, named after their leader during the final stages of their migration-Osimpam). The people migrated from the north-eastern African town of Timbuktu in the ancient Western Sudan Empire to their present land in the central coast of Ghana. The journey from the north-east to the western part of Africa was led by two brothers. The people believed that a god, whom they

A request was made to the god through divination to change the sacrifice type, as they believed that sacrificing royalty could eventually wipe out the royal family. The god in return asked for type of wildcat to be caught alive and presented to it at its shrine. After the presentation, it was to be beheaded as a sacrifice. This was to be done annually in a festival.

Before the festival began the people settled the god at a place called Penkye. After the resettlement, the god became known as Penkye Otu, to signify the final home for the god. To mark the festival, the people sought out the wild cat, as had been prescribed. Many people lost their lives in the process as the animal was to be captured live and transported to Penkye. The people made a second appeal to Penkyi Otu to provide an alternative to the wild cat. That appeal resulted in the decision to accept a mature bushbuck. Two hunting groups, the Tuafo Asafo (Number one) and Dentsifo Asafo (Number two), have since bore the task of capturing the live bushbuck and presenting it to the people at the durbar. This festival is celebrated, usually, on the first Saturday of May annually, and it is a major event in Ghana. The warriors catch a bushbuck or deer without a weapon but with bare hands.

== Oral tradition ==
The people of Simpa passed on this tradition to their descendants in the form of songs, and sang it in their war chants and also told it during moonlit nights in story form. This oral tradition went on until the colonial Europeans arrived on the coast of the Gold Coast and with them the English language. Scholars then translated the oral story from the language 'Fante' to English.

== The festival ==
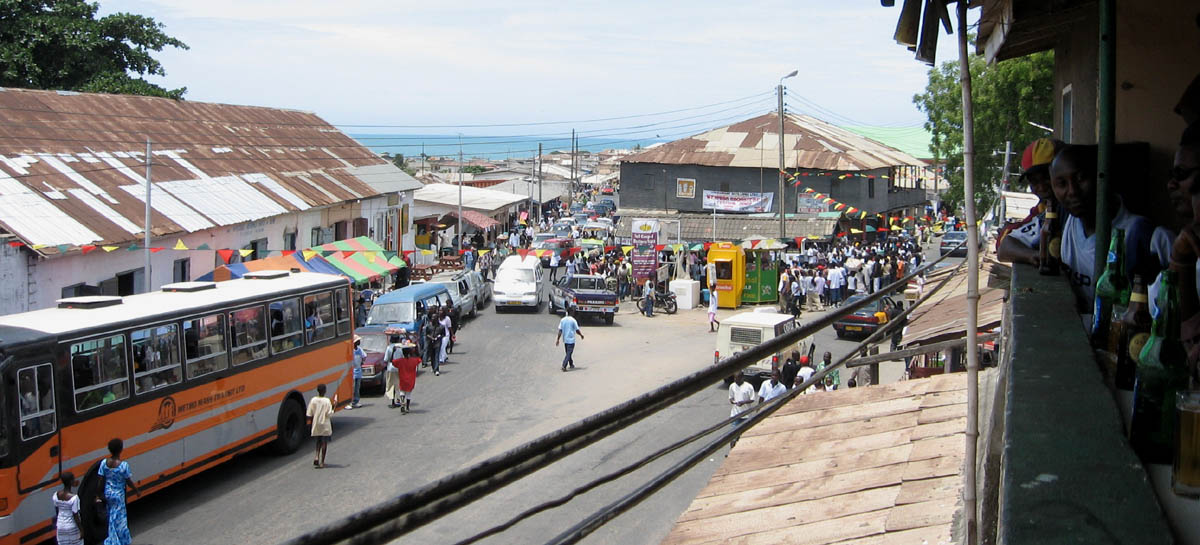
Winneba during an Aboakyer festival

The festival is celebrated on the first Saturday in May. On the first day of the festival, the two Asafo companies (warrior groups) in Winneba take part in a hunting expedition. These two groups embark on the deer hunting journey very early in the morning. The first troop to catch a live bushbuck from a game reserve used for this purpose and present.

== Gallery ==
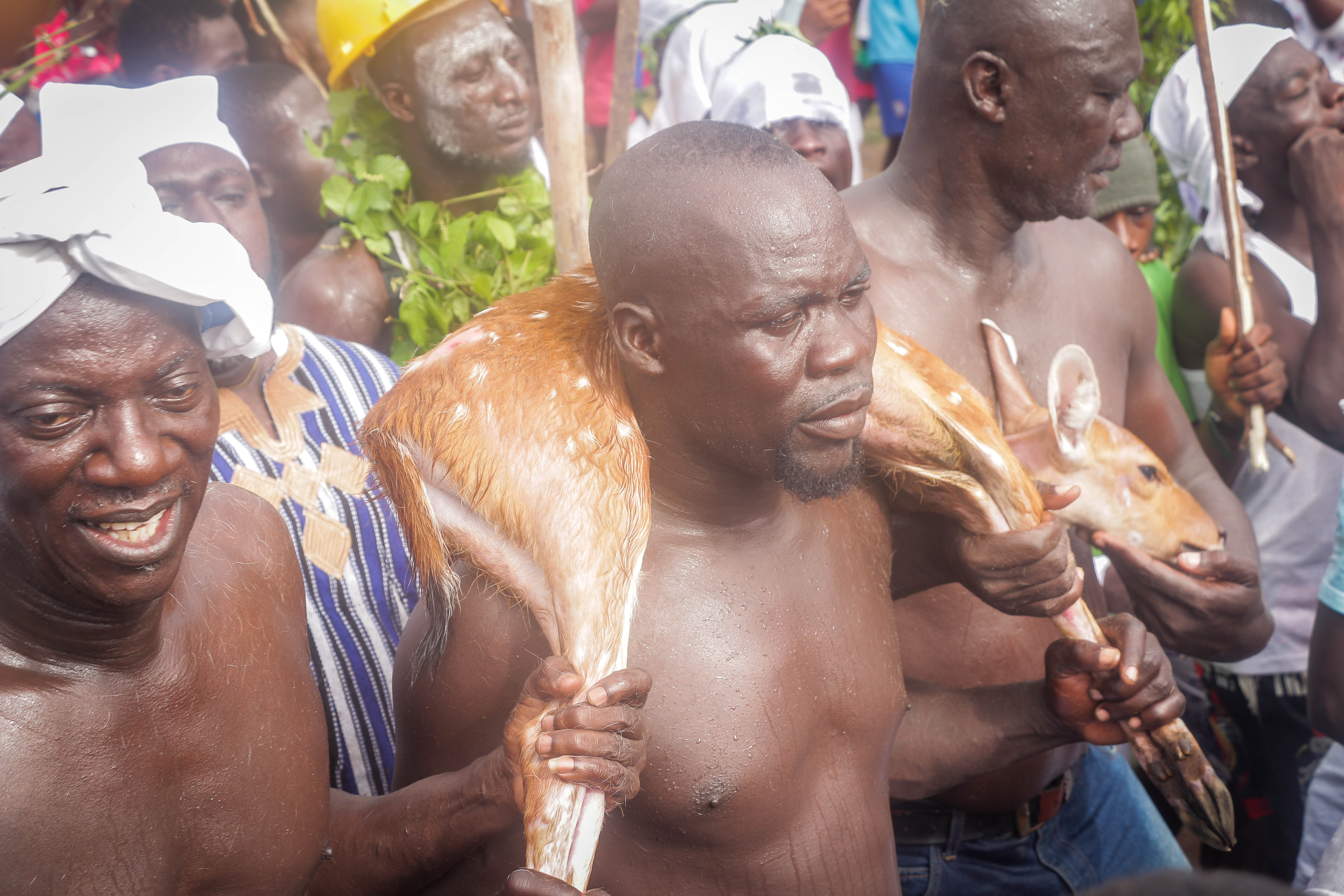
A group catches deer for the Aboakyer festival in Ghana

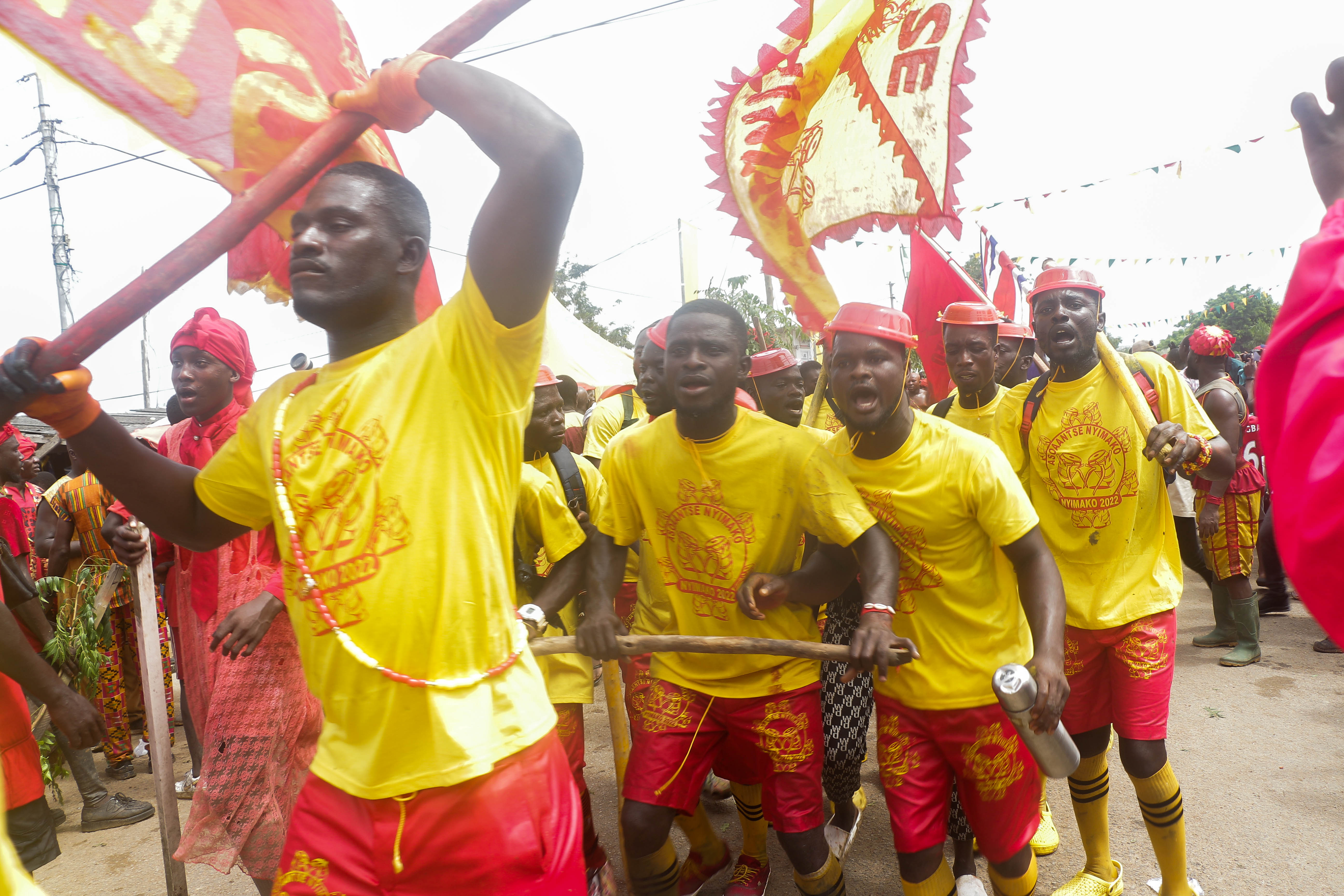
A group of men dancing and chanting during the Aboakyer festival in Ghana

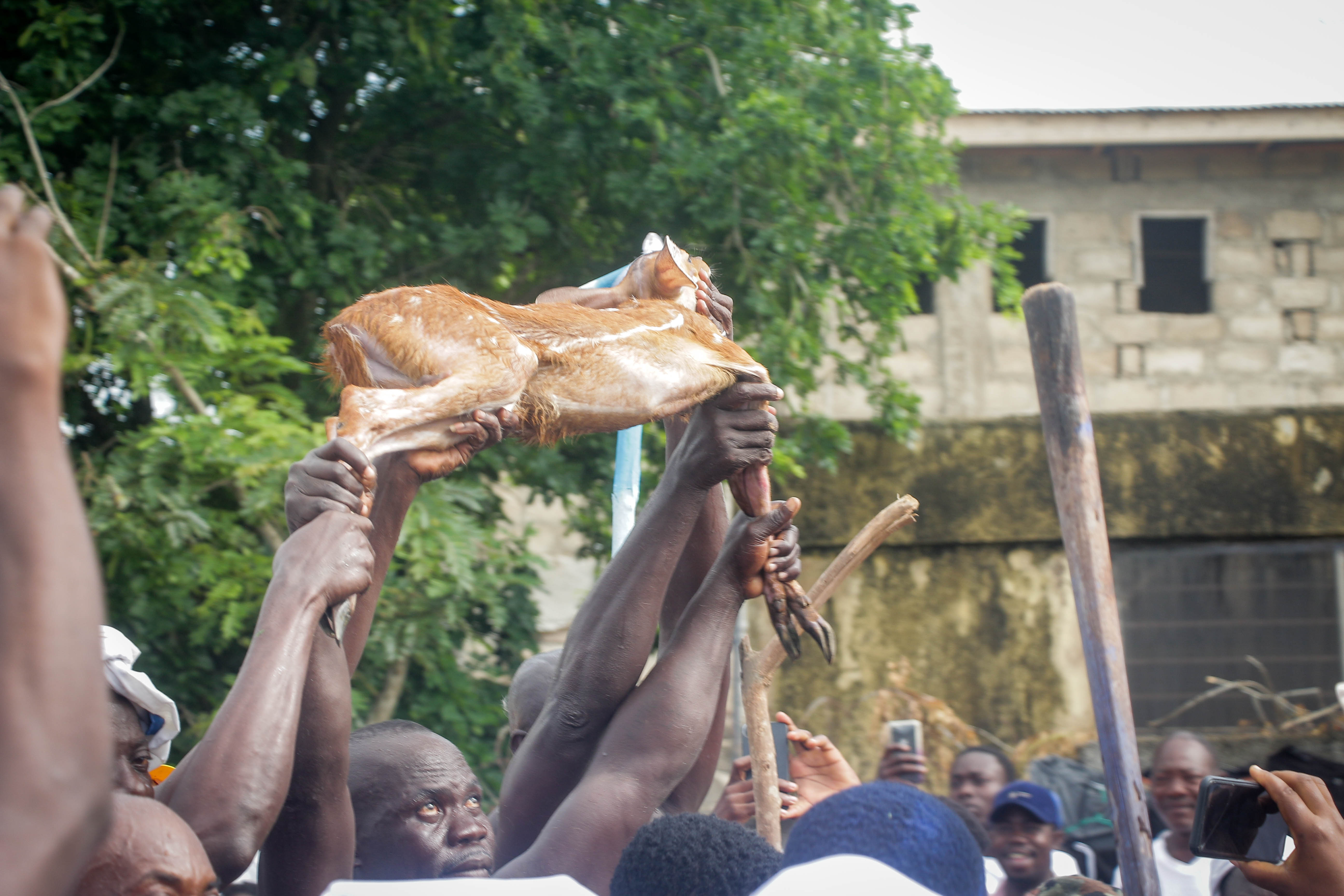
A group catches deer for the Aboakyer festival in Ghana

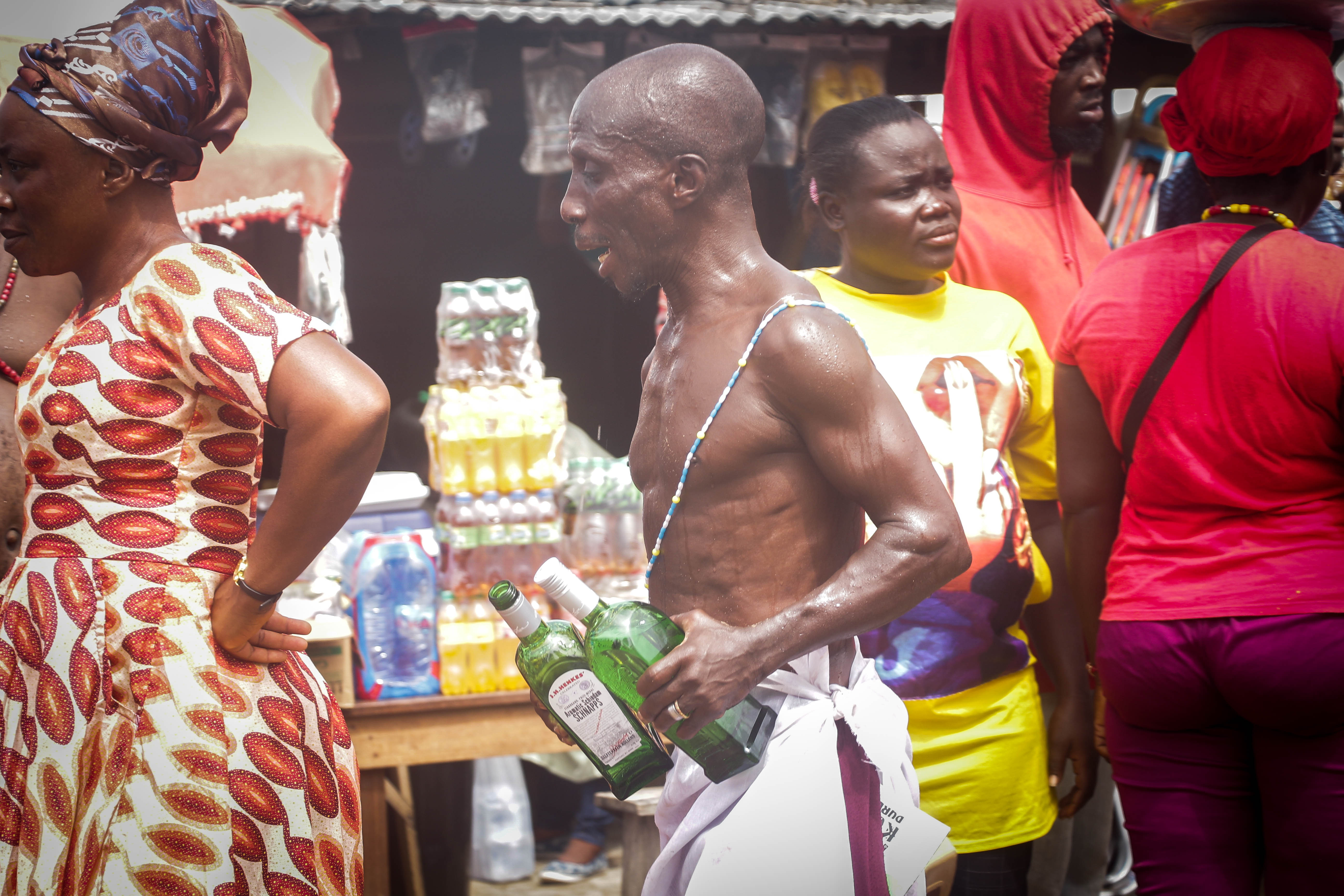
A man carrying schnapps to perform ritual during Aboakyer festival in Ghana

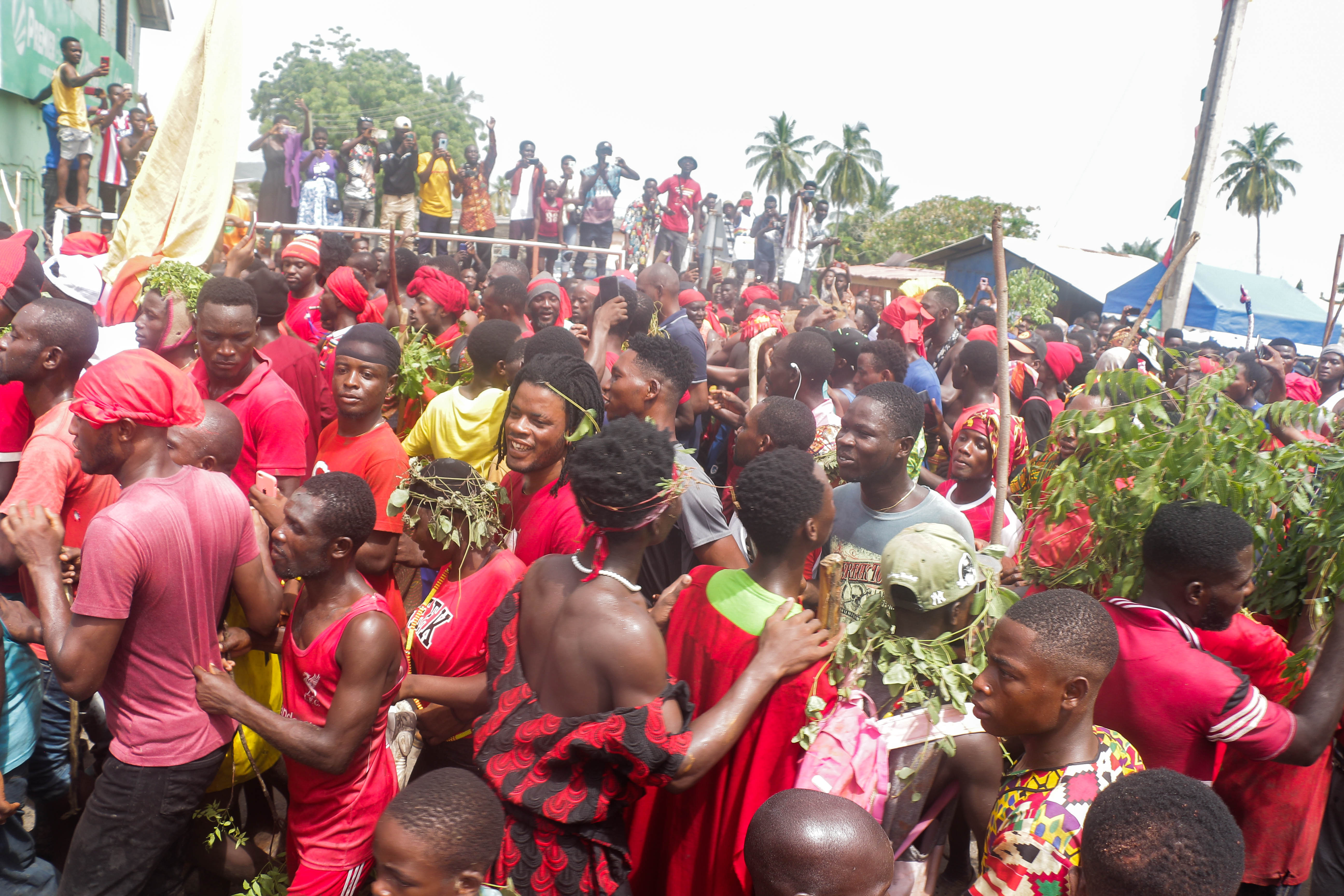
A large crowd of people celebrating the Aboakyer festival in Ghana
