= Bakatue Festival =

Festival in Ghana by the people of Elmina

The Bakatue Festival is celebrated by the chiefs and peoples of Elmina in the Central Region of Ghana. The festival, established at least as far back as 1847.It is celebrated on the first Tuesday in the month of July every year.

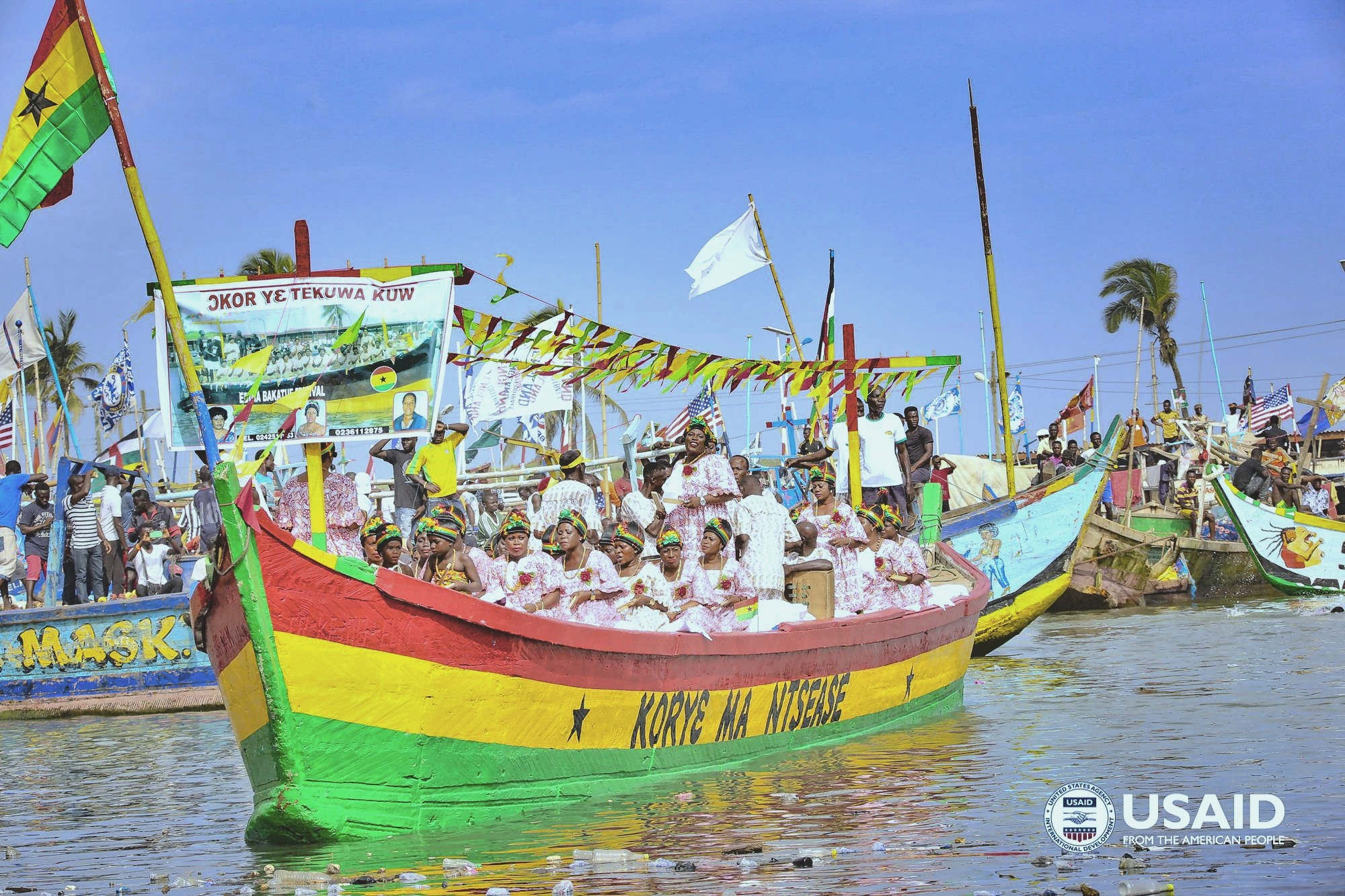
Bakatue festival in 2016

The Dutch reported existence of the festival at least as far back as 1847 and was mentioned in a report by Governor Cornelis Nagtglas in 1860. The festival is used to mark the beginning of the fishing season in Elmina. The name Bakatue is from the Fante dialect and translates as "draining of a lagoon". The celebration of the festival was instituted to commemorate the founding of Elmina by the Portuguese in the early days of the colonization of the then Gold Coast. It also is used to offer thanks and prayers to the gods for a good fishing year.

In addition to its historical importance, the festival features a grand durbar of chiefs, traditional drumming, and cultural dances that attract both locals and tourists. Rituals are performed at the Benya Lagoon, where libations and symbolic offerings are made to invoke blessings for a fruitful fishing season.

The festival has also become a significant cultural tourism event, contributing to the local economy and helping preserve the heritage of the Elmina people.

== Programme of activities ==
The Elmina states set aside the first Monday and Tuesday of the month of July for the festival.

=== Monday ===
All necessary customary activities are performed on this day.

=== Tuesday ===
It coincides with the annual rainy season of Ghana. Tuesday was chosen because it is regarded locally as the day for the sea god. As such in Elmina, as in many fishing communities in Ghana, fishermen do not go to sea on Tuesdays in order to honour the sea god. During the festival, the Paramount Chief and his sub-chiefs and the entire state of Elmina offer the sacred festival food of eggs and mashed yam mixed with palm oil to Nana Brenya, the river god, and pray for peace. On the morning of the festival, all members of the Elmina royal family participate in a royal possession made up of chiefs and stool carriers. Chiefs of higher towns in the Elmina paramount area ride decorated palanquins. After the procession and the giving of various addresses by select chiefs and invited guest, the chief priest casts his net three times into the Brenya Lagoon.

== Gallery ==
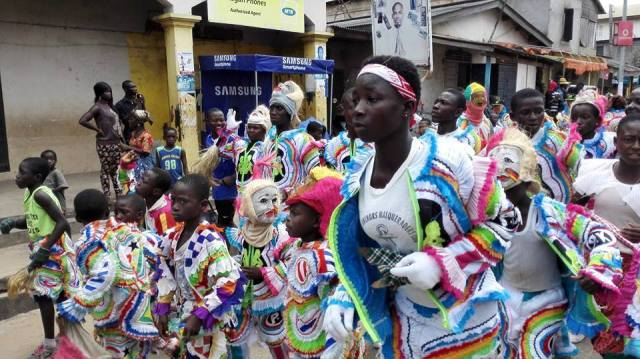
Masquerade floot at the festival
