= Odwira festival =

Ghanaian festival

The Odwira Festival is celebrated by the chiefs and peoples of Fanteakwa District and Akuapem in the Eastern Region of Ghana. The Odwira Festival is celebrated by the people of Akropong-Akuapem, Aburi, Larteh, and Mamfe. This is celebrated annually in the month of September and October. The festival celebrates a historic victory over the Ashanti’s in 1826. This was the battle of Katamansu near Dodowa. It was first celebrated in October 1826.

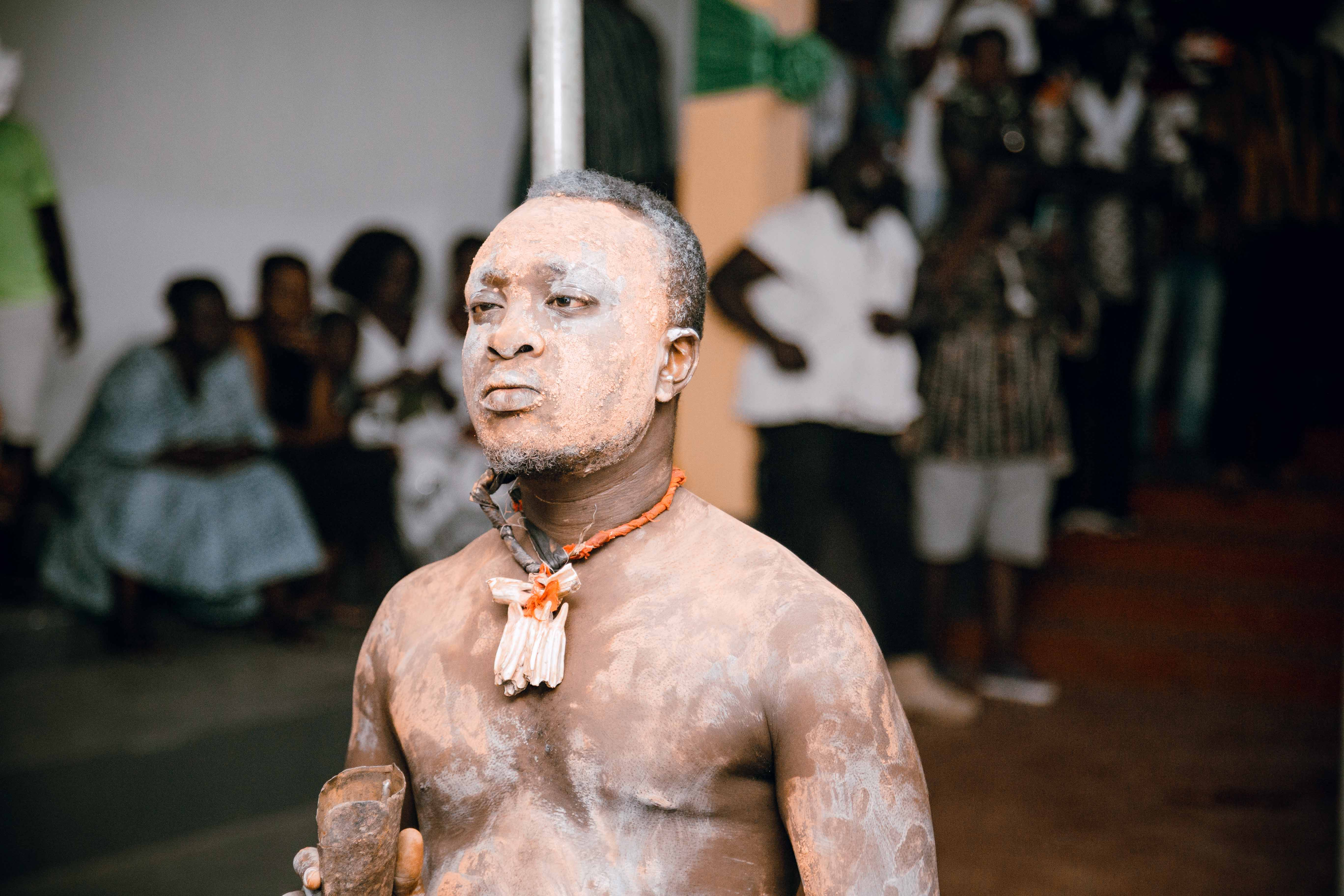
Executioner

This was during the reign of the 19th Okuapehene of Akropong, Nana Addo Dankwa I, from 1811 to 1835. It is a time of spiritual purification where the people are renewed and receive protection. It is also celebrated by the people of Jamestown in Accra. This is due to the associations formed through the intermarriages of the Ga and Akuapem people.

Customarily, the scheduling of the festival occurs simultaneously with the reaping season when there is bumper food; during which gratitude is shown to the Ancestors by the people. Being a yam festival, thanksgiving for the bumper reap is principally demonstrated in the "giving food to the ancestors".

== History ==
For nearly 200 years, generations of Akropong, Amanokrom and Aburi have annually celebrated the Odwira festival which was initiated by Nana Addo Dankwa 1 (1811 - 1835), the 19th Okuapehene of Akuapem. Other towns in the 17 Akuapem states also celebrate the Odwira festival. The celebration is linked to the victory of the people of Okuapeman over the then-powerful Asante army during the historic battle of Katamansu near Dodowa in 1826.

Odwira celebration follows a long-standing routine of a tradition carefully planned from generation of old and occurs as follows:

Adaebutu

This is a period of quiet meditation. For forty days preceding the Odwira festival, there is a ban on all forms of noisemaking and funerals across Akuapem. Offenders are penalized for going against the order.

Odwira da Monday

In the Akan dispensation, there’s the belief that a chief never dies. Instead, a chief goes "to the village". On the Monday of Odwira, the path to this village is cleared. This sacred private event involves the clearing of the ceremonial path from the centre of Akropong, the capital of Okuapeman, to the Royal Mausoleum also known as Amanprobi. The ancient custom is led by the Abrafo (State Executioners) and their chief, the Adumhene. The path clearing symbolises that our ancestors (Nananom), will come and join the celebration of Odwira, at the Okuapehene’s Palace.

Odwira da Tuesday

Odwira is believed to be a spiritual gift bestowed from the Ancestors of the royal ruling clan. On this day, the Gyaasehene – one of the five Divisional Chiefs of the Akuapem Traditional Area and Administrator of all royal courtiers, summons the Banmuhene (Chief of the Royal Mausoleum and custodian of the Ancestors).

The Gyaasehene officially informs the Banmuhene that the Okuapehene, also known as the Omanhene, is ready to celebrate Odwira. The Banmuhene is tasked by the Gyaasehene to return to the sacred forest, where the Royal Mausoleum is housed, confer with the Ancestors (Nananom) and bring the Odwira from Nananom to the Okuapehene.

Also, on Odwira da Tuesday, representatives of the 7 Stool houses in Akropong outdoor the new harvest of yam. This is done inside the house of Kubri. Before this day and hour, it is forbidden to taste the new yam in any of the Akuapem states. It is also not allowed in the town. The Okuapehene sits in state and waits on the Baamuhene and his people to bring the blessings of Odwira. It is only when the Baamuhene and his people return with the blessings of the ancestors, that Odwira can be celebrated.

Once the Baamuhene returns, he approaches the Okuapehene, where a ceremonial cloth is placed over their heads, and it is believed that only the Baamuhene and the Okuapehene see what the ancestors have presented.

After this, the ban on noise making is lifted.

Odwira da Wednesday

On this day, the entire Akropong is immersed in a state of communal mourning. The dress code is symbolically black and red as families gather to mourn departed souls. The Okuapehene visits each of the seven stool houses in Akropong – Aboasa, Asona, Twafo, Benkum, Kyeame and Akrahene to sympathise with them.

Beginning at dawn, the memory of all Ancestors (Nananom) and all citizens from every household in Akropong who have died over the preceding year are honoured. The ancestors (Nananom), for whom the path has been ceremonially cleared for, are considered to spiritually join the Odwira.

Odwira da Thursday

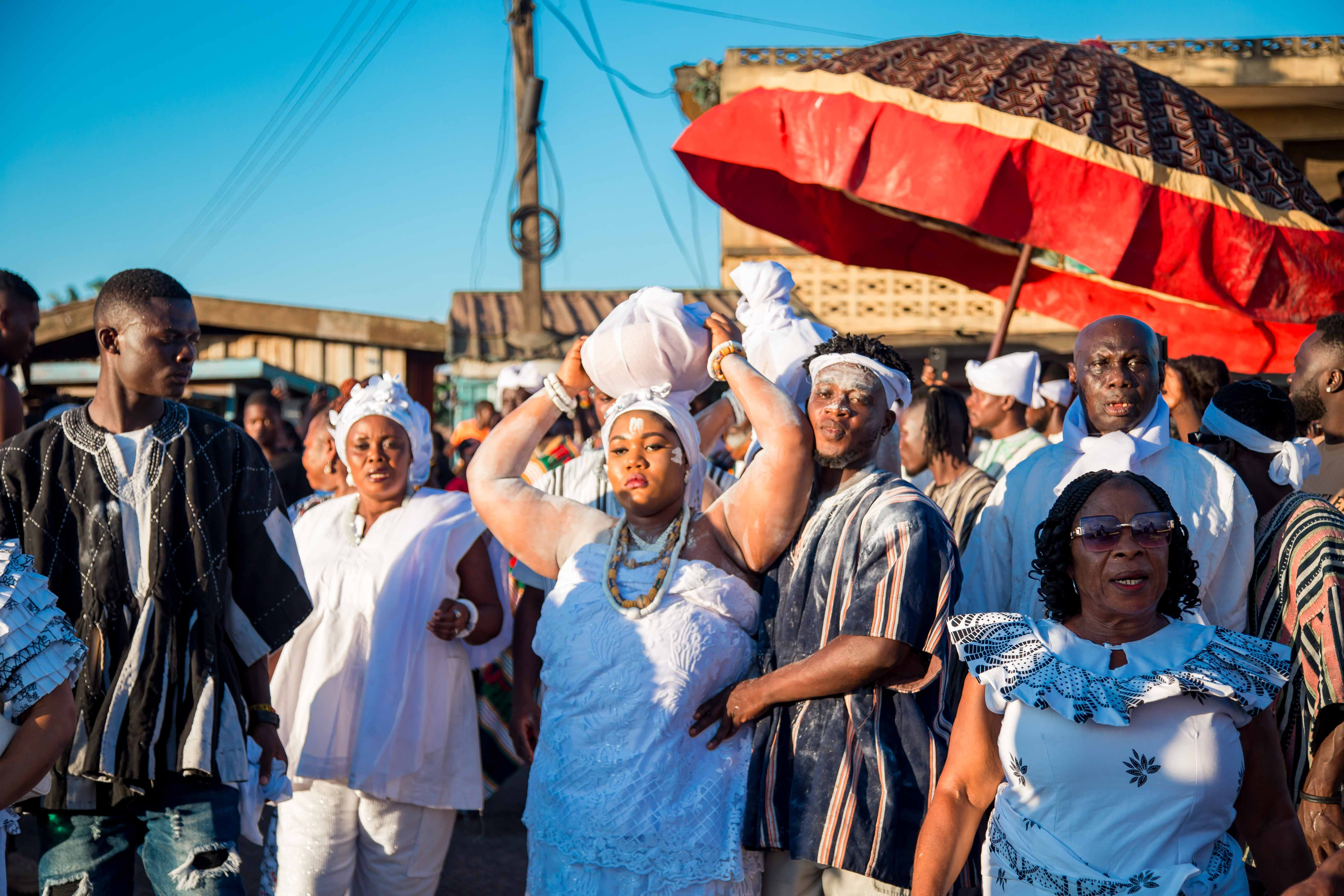
A virgin Woman Carrying Food for the gods; Rituals performed on Odwira Thursday

The people of Okuapeman recognize a supreme God and offer thanksgiving to him while also affirming their allegiance to the Omanhene, the occupant of the Ofori Kuma stool. On this occasion, the Okuapehene wears ceremonial robes, sits in state, and receives visitors who come to pay their respects.

During this period, a young maiden, one of the traditional wives of the omanhene publicly parades through the principal streets of the town as she journeys to present a special dish of “Eto” to her husband. Later in the day, the custodian of the royal mausoleum – Banmuhene with a procession of his people takes “Eto” to Nsurem – the first sacred resting place of the first omanhene of Okuapeman, to feed the ancestors. Other chiefs from the various stool houses follow suit.

Beginning at 7 in the evening, the Okuapehene and his five divisional chiefs – Gyaasehene, Benkumhene, Nifahene, Adontenhene and Kurontihene, go to the abode of sacred stools to individually re-affirm and swear their loyalty and allegiance to the Ofori Kuma Stool. This pivotal ceremony is evidence of a united Akuapem Kingdom.

At 10 pm, a curfew is enacted, under the cloak of symbolic darkness. Akropong falls silent as state executioners (Abrafo) take the Stools and regalia of Okuapeman through the deserted streets of Akropong to Ademi mu (a historical river) for the sacred cleansing rituals. On their return, they present themselves and the cleansed Stools as well as regalia to the Okuapehene. It is believed that, during this rite, it’s forbidden for a citizen not part of the entourage to see them. In this private ceremony, the Okuapehene symbolically strips naked and is wrapped in a sacred strip of cloth and he fires 3 rounds of a musket, signifying the close of the day and ceremony. This also signifies that Omanhene has the mandate to host the grand durbar that would follow the next day.

Odwira da Friday

This day essentially climaxes the rites and traditions of the celebration. The chiefs, elders and people of Okuapeman congregate at Mpeniase – (the first tree planted on the first day that Akropong became the capital of Okuapeman. The Mpeniase, hence remains a living symbol of the spirit of the Akuapem Traditional Area) to publicly pay homage. Attended by the Clergy, Government Officials and others, the Okuapehene presents a review of the year and outlines projects and development activities for the new year. The Okuapehene receives goodwill messages from the Government and his people, both at home and abroad.

The Omanhene presents what is in effect a state of the Kingdom address to Okuapeman. Previous celebrations have shown that this is the day that receives the most visitors. The night is full of activities from concerts to pageant shows. Companies use this opportunity to market their products by sponsoring and hosting specific side events.

Odwira da Saturday and Sunday

This day especially Saturday do not hold any official activities but other activities such as community games like football competition, Scrabble competitions, etc do happen for the fun and amusement of the youth within the localities.

On Sunday, the ‘Krontihene’ of Akuapem holds a special durbar as part of the Odwira Festival and to climax the festival.
