= List of festivals in Ghana =

Types of festivals in Ghana

Festivals in Ghana are celebrated for many reasons pertaining to a particular tribe or culture, usually having backgrounds relating to an occurrence in the history of that culture. Examples of such occurrences have been hunger, migration, purification of either gods or stools, etc.

== Reasons for celebrating festivals ==
The importance of each festival's celebration includes:

- Planning developmental project. The festival is used as an occasions to meet and plan developmental projects in the area since most citizens are likely to attend.
- Purification of gods. The period is used to clean ancestral stools and perform important rites.
- Thanksgiving. The festival is used to thank the supreme God and the lesser gods for the guidance and protection
- National and political significance. Prominent people in the government are invited to explain government policies and programmes.
- Dispute resolution. The occasion is used to settle family and individual disputes for peaceful co-existence.
- To promote tourism. Some festivals celebrated in Ghana attract many foreign tourists to the country. An example is the Aboakyir festival. Tourism is the third foreign-exchange earner for Ghana.

== List of traditional festivals and their month of celebration ==
| Festival in Ghana | Ethnic group that celebrates |
|---|---|
| Bakatue | Elmina (Fante) |
| Homowo | Ga |
| Aboakyer | Efutu (Winneba) |
| Kundum | Nzema |
| Foo (Fao) | Navrongo |
| Kpini Chugu (Guinea fowl Festival) | Dagombas, Mamprusis, Nanumbas, Kokombas and Basaris |
| Ohum | Akim, Akuapem |
| Hogbetsotso | Anlo |
| Ngmayem | Krobo |
| Volo (Me/Lomo) | Volos |
| Yam | Ho |
| Buɣum Chuɣu (Fire Festival)al) | Dagomba Dagbon, Gonja, Mamprusi and Nanumba |
| Beng | Gonja |
| Lukusi | Ve (Near Hohoe) |
| Danyiba | Kpando |
| Fetu Afahye | Oguaa (Cape Coast) |
| Adae Kese | Ashanti Etc. |
| Adae | Asante,Akim, Akwamu |
| Asafotufiam | Ada |
| Dzawuwu Festival | Agave |
| Fiok | Builsa |
| Apafram | Akwamu |
| Osudoku Festival | Asutsuare |
| Afenorto Festival | Mepe |
| Papa Festival | Kumawu |
| Opemso Festival | Kokofu-Anyinam |
| Ɔvazu Festival | Akposo |
| Damba festival | Dagomba people, Gonja, Mamprusi |
| Apoo festival | Techiman, Wenchi |
| Eddie Festival | Wasa people |

Below is a list of all traditional, religious commemorative festivals celebrated throughout the year in Ghana. These may not entirely consist of festivals of Ghanaian descent.

== Commemorating farming season ==
- Kakube festival
- Kobine Festival

== Commemorating migration ==
- Akwantukese Festival
- Hogbetsotso festival
- Keta-Some Tutuza
- Suma Akwantukese

== Religious ==
- Akwasidae Festival
- Aboakyer festival
- Easter
- Christmas
- Eid al-Fitr
- Eid al-Adha

== Film Festivals ==
- Berlinale Spotlight: Accra
- Black Star International Film Festival (BSIFF)
- Accra Indie Filmfest
- Ndiva Women's Film Festival

== Others ==
- Agadevi (Have, Afadzato South District, Volta Region)
- Agbamevo Festival
- Ahobaa
- Akwambo festival
- Akwantutenten (Worawora, Volta Region)
- Amu Festival
- Apoor
- Asafotu-fiam (Ada in the Eastern region)
- Asafotufiam Festival
- Asafua Festival
- Asogli Yam Festival
- Atu-Ho-Akye (Ejisu, Ashanti Region)
- Ayimagonu Festival
- Ayimagonu Festival
- Bakatue festival
- Beng Festival
- Chale Wote Street Art Festival
- Damba festival
- Danso Abaim & Ntoa Fukokuese Festivals (Techimentia & Nkoranza, in the Brong Ahafo Region)
- Dipo Festival (Manya Krobo, Yilo Krobo, Eastern Region)
- Dzawuwu Festival
- Dzohayem (Osudoku, Greater Accra)
- Edina Buronya Festival
- Eiok (War Festival)
- Alluolue festival
- Fetu Afahye
- Fiok (Sandema by the Builsas)
- Gbidukor Festival
- Gbidukor Festival
- Glimetoto Festival
- Golob (Tengzung, Upper East Region)
- Gologo festival
- Gwolgu
- Munufie festival
- Jintigi (All Gonja Towns, Northern Region)
- Kente Festival (Bonwire, Ashanti Region)
- Kloyosikplem festival (Ghana Eastern region)
- Kobine
- Kpalikpakpa zã (Kpalime Traditional Area in the Volta Region)
- Kpini-Kyiu Festival (Wa & Tongu, in the Upper East Region)
- Kpledjoo
- Kundum Festival
- Kwafie
- Meet Me There Weekender
- Mmoanniko Festival
- Nkyidwo (Essumeja)
- Ntoa Fokuose
- Nyidwoo
- Odambea Festival
- Odwira festival
- Paragbeile Festival
- Rice festival (Akpafu, in the Volta Region)
- Sasadu Festival
- Sometutuza (Keta)
- Tenghana Festival (Wa & Tongu, in the Upper East Region)
- Tongu Upper East Region
- Wilaa Festival (Takpo, Upper West Region)
- Yaa Asantewaa Festival
- Ɔvazu Festival (Akposokubi) Oti Region, formally Volta/Trans-Volta Togoland
