= Kente Festival =

Festival in Ghana by the Bonwire people

The Kente Festival is an annual harvest festival celebrated by the chiefs and peoples of Bonwire in the Ejisu-Juaben district in the Ashanti region of Ghana. It is usually celebrated in the month of January. Others also claim it is celebrated in July or August.

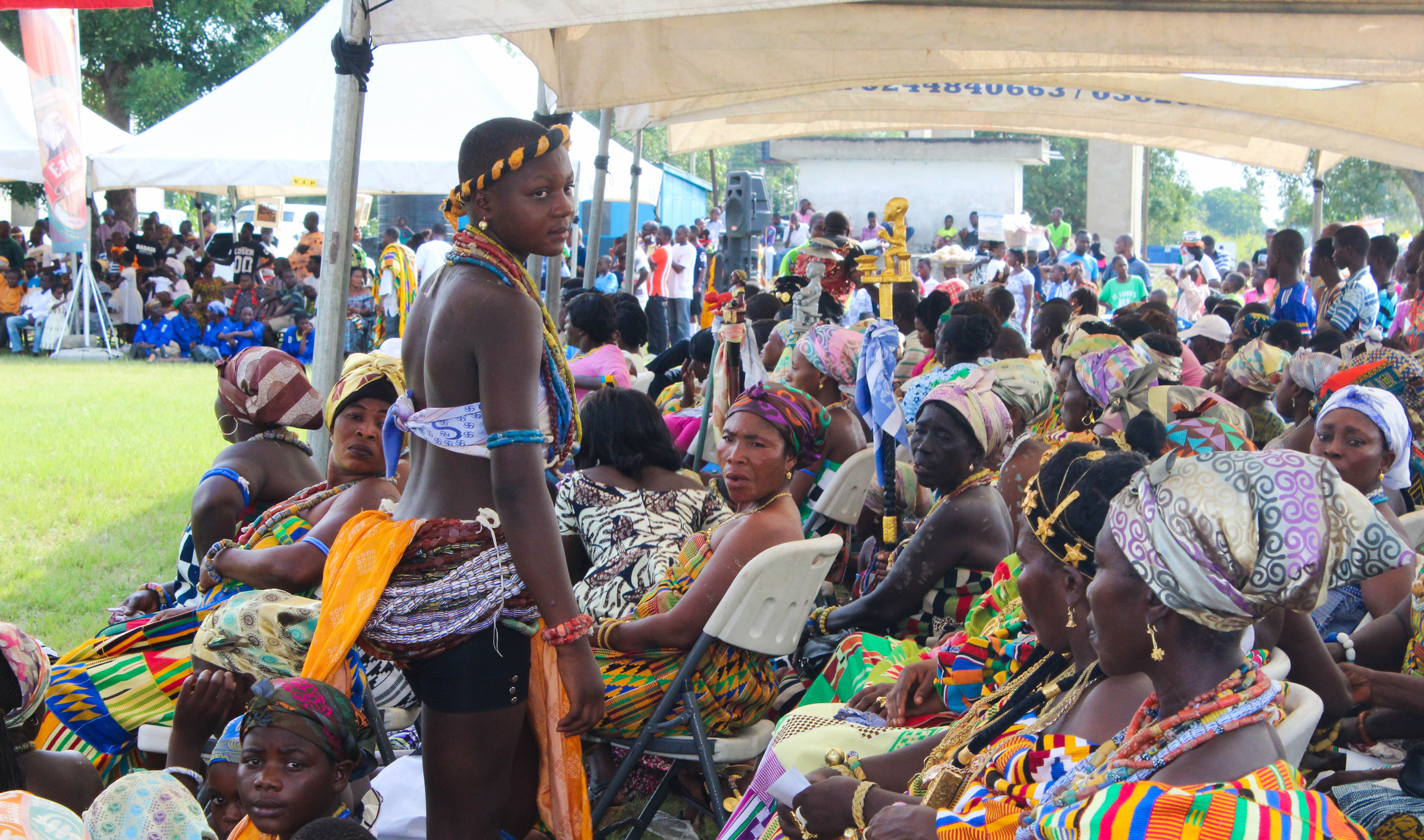
A Kente Festival

== Celebrations ==
It is celebrated to promote and mark the invention of the Kente industry in the town of Bonwire. The festival also intends to assert the influence of the Kente as cloth from Ghana. The chiefs and the inhabitants of Bonwire wear Kente clothes and various designs they sewn.

== Significance ==
The festival is commemorated to mark the origin of the Kente cloth in the town of Bonwire which was invented over 300 years ago.
