= Nelson Kwami Maglo =

Ghanaian politician

Nelson Kwami Maglo was a Ghanaian politician in the first republic. He was the member of parliament for the Anlo North Constituency from 1956 to 1965 and the Avenor Constituency from 1965 to 1966.

== Early life and education ==
Maglo was born on 24 December 1913 in Avenorpedo in the Volta Region of Ghana (then Gold Coast). He attended the Government Trade School in Kyebi.

== Career and politics ==
Maglo was a teacher by profession. He qualified as a teacher in 1939 and founded the Sanga Peki Methodist Infant School. In 1945, he was employed by the E. P. C Primary School in Abor, where he was later made headmaster. He was also the Chairman of the Finance and Staff Committee of the Avenor Local Council from 1952 to 1954. In 1954, he was voted on the ticket of the Convention People's Party to represent the Anlo North seat. He was re-elected in 1956, and was sworn into office on 30 July that same year. He served in this capacity until 1965, when he became the member of parliament for the Avenor Constituency. He remained in this post until 24 February 1966 when the Nkrumah government was overthrown.
