= Have, Ghana =

- Town
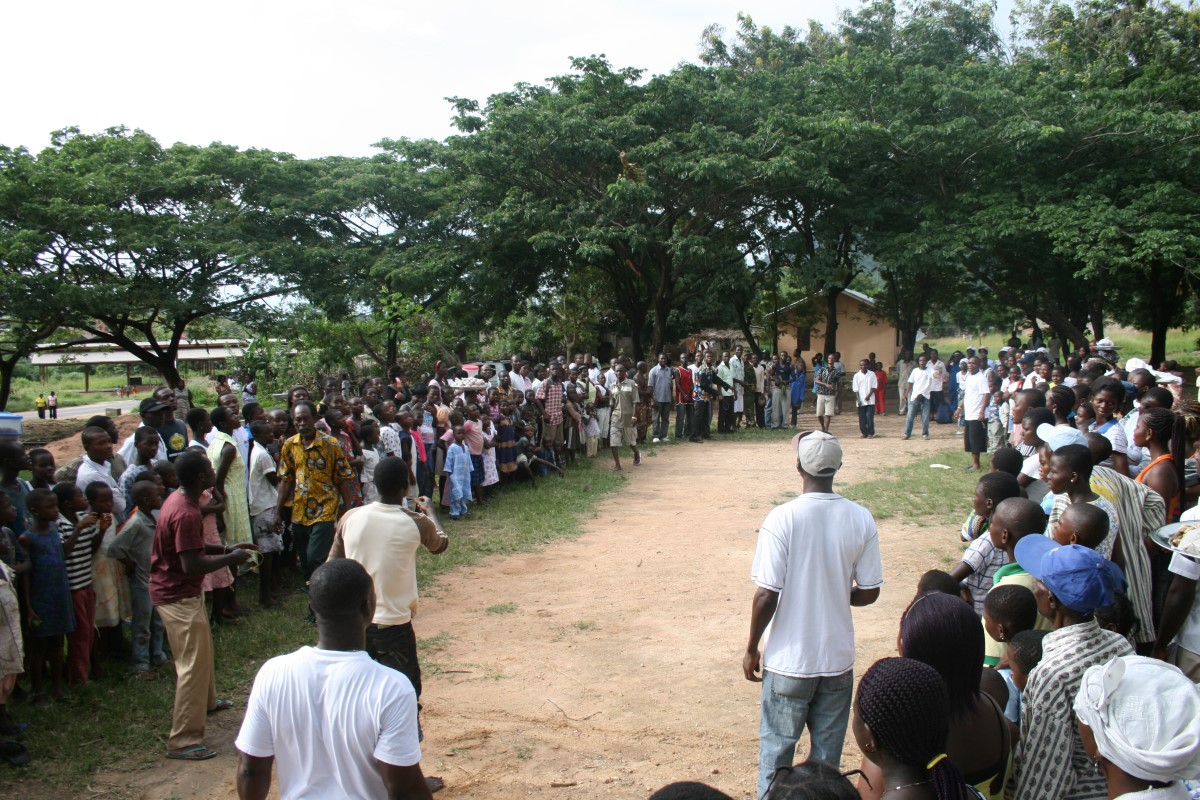
- Haveawo (Have Citizens) playing fun games

- Location of Have on the Map
- Coordinates: 6°45′38″N 0°21′43″E
- Country: Ghana
- Region: Volta Region
- Time zone: GMT

Have is a town located in the western valley of the Akwapim Togo mountain range, locally called Ewetogbeka or Nyito, in the Afadzato South District of the Volta Region of Ghana. It is bounded on the south by Agate, on the north by Nyagbo, on the east by the mountain range and in the west by river Dayi. The citizens of Have are called Haveawo.

== Origin of name ==
Oral tradition indicates that Have, Woadze, and Goviefe, all descended from one ancestor called Agoe. The three sister divisions sprang from the three sons of "Grandmother Agoe", the eldest son being the father of Have descendants. The traditional name "Govie-Duta–Etɔ" means triple towns.

== Demographics - composition ==
Have is made up of five towns namely: Etoe in the south, and Akleme, Atsiame, Agorme and Domefe in the north, collectively referred to as Gboxome. Etoe is made up of three sub-divisions, namely, Etoedzigbe, Ablordi and Tegbevi. There are also a number of settler communities dotted along the banks of river Dayi. These include Aveyoyoe, Sadzikofe, Adzekofe, and Ando Number 1 and 2.

== Traditional authority ==
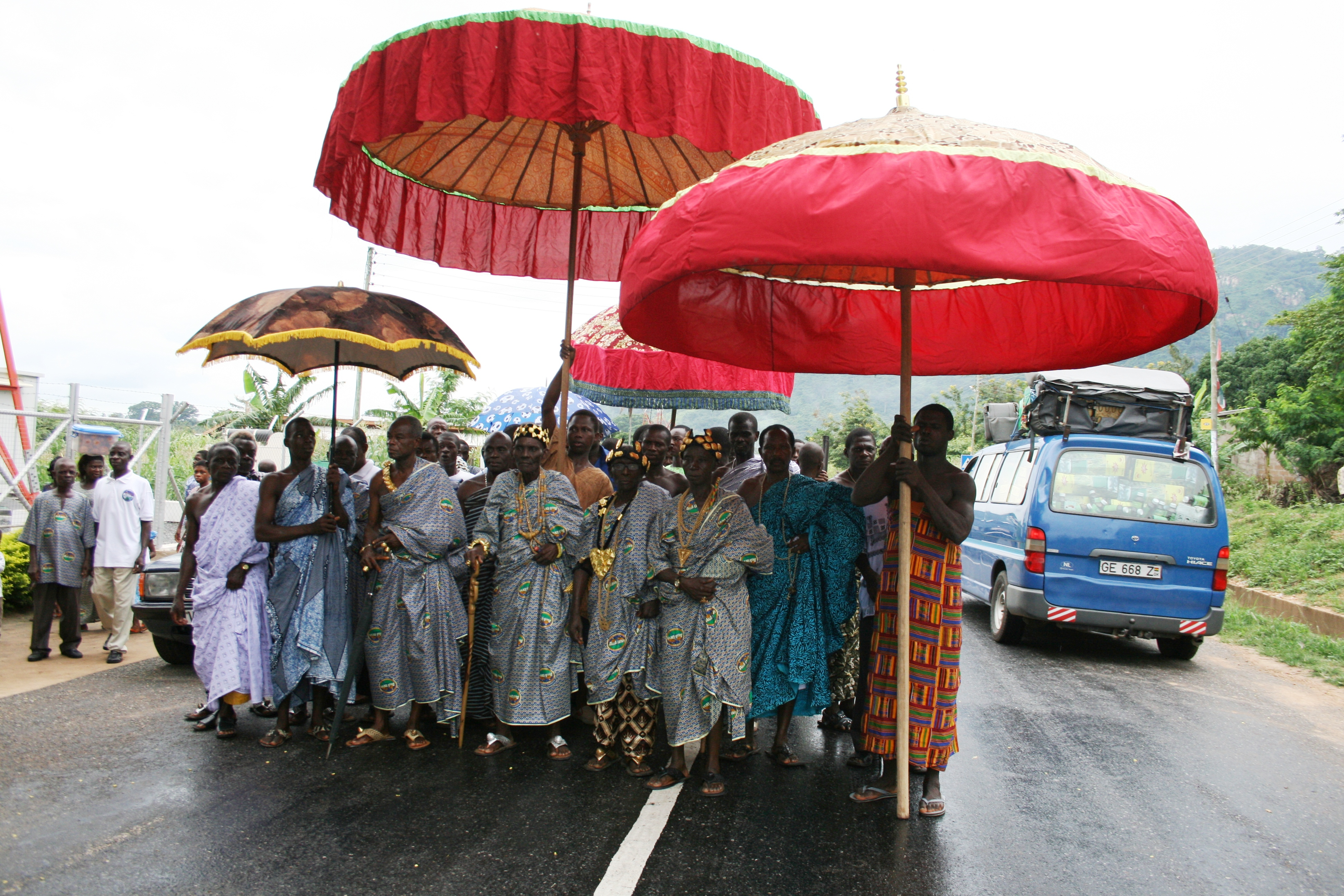
Have Traditional Council of Chiefs - June 2009

Current Composite Structure
Division	Role	Chief
Etoe	Ngofia (Front wing)	Togbe Makata Stool
Akleme	Fiaga (Paramountcy)	Togbe Asemtsyra Stool
Domefe	Dusimefia (Right wing)	Togbe Krakani Apawu Stool
Agorme	Miamefia (Left wing)	Togbe Akoto Stool
Atsiame	Megbefia (Rear wing)	Togbe Kokotsitsi Stool

== Festival ==
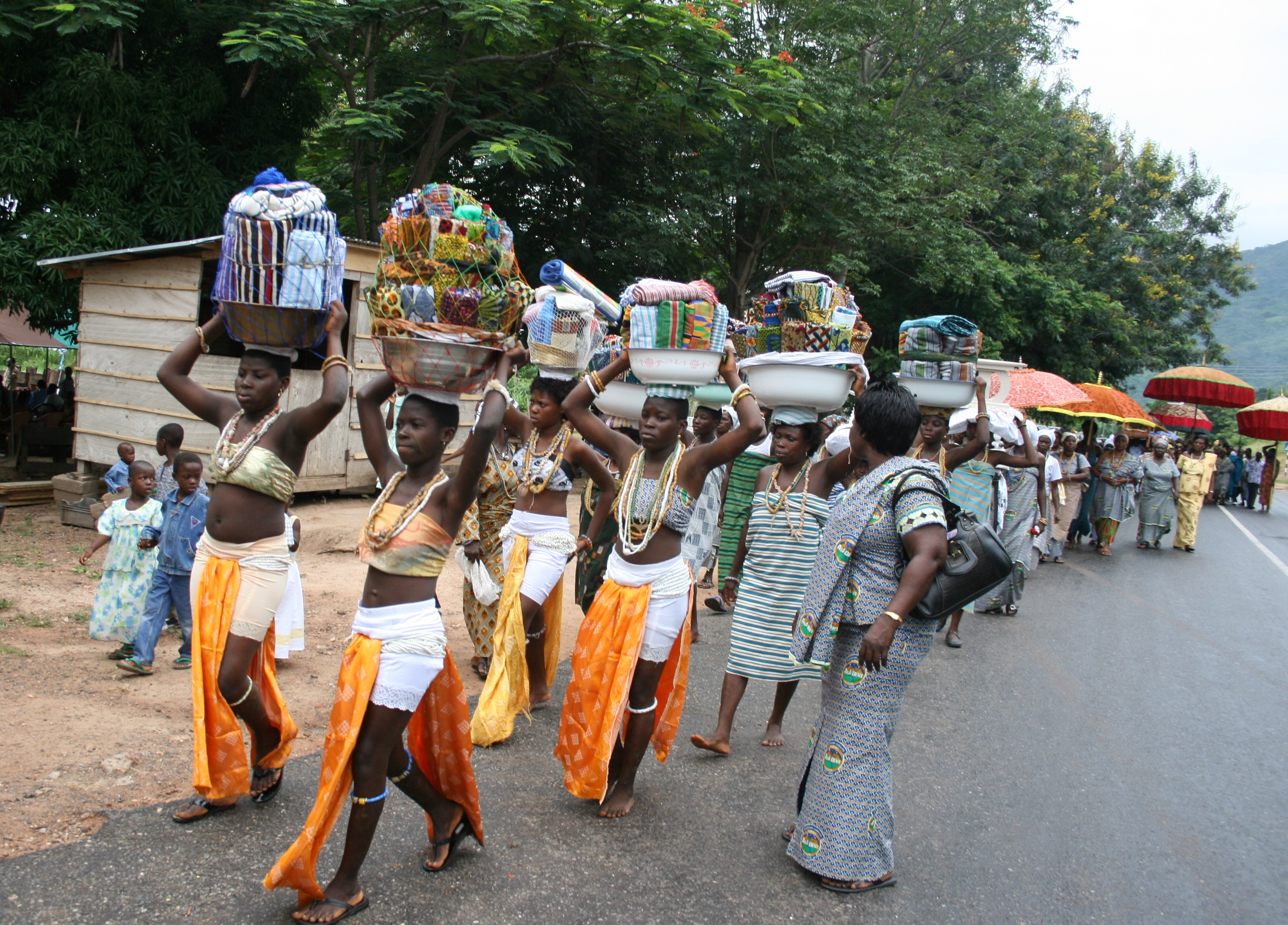
Procession to Agadevi Festival Durber in June 2009

The people of Have celebrate Agadevi Festival. Agadevi marks a major landslide that occurred on 15 June 1933 on a section of the Akwapim-Togo Range at the foot of which Have is situated. Agadevi, meaning "the mountain broke into fragments," is the term used by the people of Have to describe this phenomenon.

== Migratory story ==
Like the other tribesmen of the Ewe people, the people of Have migrated from Sudan, traveled through Ketu in the Niger, and lived in Notsie or Glime. Forced out by the tyranny and inhuman treatment of King Agorkorli, the Ewes escaped Notsie in the seventeenth century. During their flight, the Haveawo traveled westwards and first settled at Loglota in the Republic of Togo. They then moved to Havega, also in Togo, and later settled in Adaklu. Unfavorable circumstances, primarily, lack of good drinking water made them leave Adaklu and continued their journey westwards. They crossed the river Dayi and settled at Tsawegbe by the banks of the river. Later, they were attracted by the vibrant valley between the luxuriant mountain range and the river. This coupled with the presence of many springs from the mountain made them move nearer to the mountain, to settle in their present location.

== Colonial era ==
Togoland became a German colony in 1885. Have, and all the surrounding villages lying in the valley between Weto and river Dayi and beyond to the Volta, were part of this colony. Kpeve, located about five miles away from Have was an important settlement, being the border town where the Gold Coast and Togoland shared boundary.

Have, as a result of its leadership role during the allied military campaigns, was given the recognition as one of the seats of paramountcy by the surrounding villages of Tsoxo, Botoku, Tsrukpe, Wusuta, Goviefe, Woadze, Agate, Kpeve, Anfoeta, Hlefi, Bame, Todome, Etodome, Kpale, Nyagbo, Tafi and Logba. Consequently, Have became the center at which administrative instructions were given by colonial rulers. During the administration of Captain Mansfield, the then District Commissioner at Ho (Galenkutodzi) and later that of Captain Lily (based at Kpandu), Have became a sub-center at which all court cases were heard. The Fiaga of Have was empowered to adjudicate and preside over all court cases in the absence of the District Commissioners. He was also given the power to supervise the stamping of guns, selling of guns and gunpowder in the various communities. Some of the prominent paramount chiefs of Have during this era were Togbe Asiam, Togbe Agbale and Togbe Yaokuma.
