= Glimetoto Festival =

Festival in Ghana by the people of Adaklu in Volta region

Glimetoto Festival is an annual festival celebrated by the chiefs and people of Adaklu Traditional Area in the Volta Region of Ghana. It comprises Kpeve, Klikor, and Tsohor. It is usually celebrated in the month of November.

== Celebrations ==
During the festival, there is a grand durbar of chiefs where most settlements are held. They also show the bravery of their ancestors in the form of war songs, drums and dances.

== Significance ==
The festival is celebrated to commemorate the exodus of the people of Adaklu from Notsie in Togoland to their current place of abode.
