= Agbamevo Festival =

Festival in Ghana by the Agotime people

The Agbamevo Festival (Kente Festival) is an annual festival celebrated by the chiefs and people of Agotime Traditional Area. It is located some kilometers east of Ho in the Volta Region of Ghana. It is usually celebrated in the month of August. They are Ga-Adangbes. The word Agbamevo means 'loom-cloth' in the Ewe Language.

== Celebrations ==
During the festival, a durbar of chiefs and their subjects put on display different types of the Kente. There is also a competition of Kente weavers and the best is crowned the winner. During the evening, there is also 'Miss Kente' where they are selected.

== Significance ==
The festival is celebrated because the people of Agotime claimed they introduced the Kente weaving art in Ghana. It attracts people both far and near.
