= Sometutuza =

The Keta-Sometutuza or Keta-Sometutu Festival is an annual festival celebrated by the chiefs and peoples of Agbozume in Ketu South District in the Volta Region of Ghana. It is usually celebrated two weeks after the Hogbetsotso festival. It is celebrated by the Somey people of Agbozume, Denu and surrounding communities to commemorate their migration from Keta in 1792-94 after the Keta -Anloga War. It is usually celebrated on the 3rd Saturday in November.

== Celebrations ==
There are pageantry shows and pomp during the festival. There is also a grand durbar of chiefs with their subjects. The festival commences with performance of traditional rites in Keta and the main durbar at Agbozume. The chiefs pay homage to their paramount chief and they renew their allegiance to him. During the festival, there is also a display of different types of Ewe Kente, and other traditional and woven textiles.

== Significance ==
It is celebrated to mark the exodus from Keta , their place of origin to their present settlement.
