= Helekpe =

Town in Volta Region, Ghana

Adaklu-Helekpe
- Town
- Location of Adaklu-Helekpe in Volta Region
- Coordinates: 06°29′15.97″N 00°29′14.78″E
- Country: Ghana
- Region: Volta Region
- District: Adaklu District
- Time zone: UTC0 (GMT)

Adaklu-Helekpe is a small town in the Adaklu District in the Volta Region of Ghana. As at 2017, the Chief of the town is Togbe Krakani IV.

== Adaklu Mountain mudslide ==
In August 2017, rocks from the mountain destroyed farms belonging to residents of the town.

In May 2026, a mudslide carrying debris from the Adaklu Mountain after a rainfall destroyed properties in the town.

== Notable natives ==
- Israel Agbesi Ayim, a physically challenged farmer.
- Elias Avenyo, an opinion leader
