= Peki =

- Town
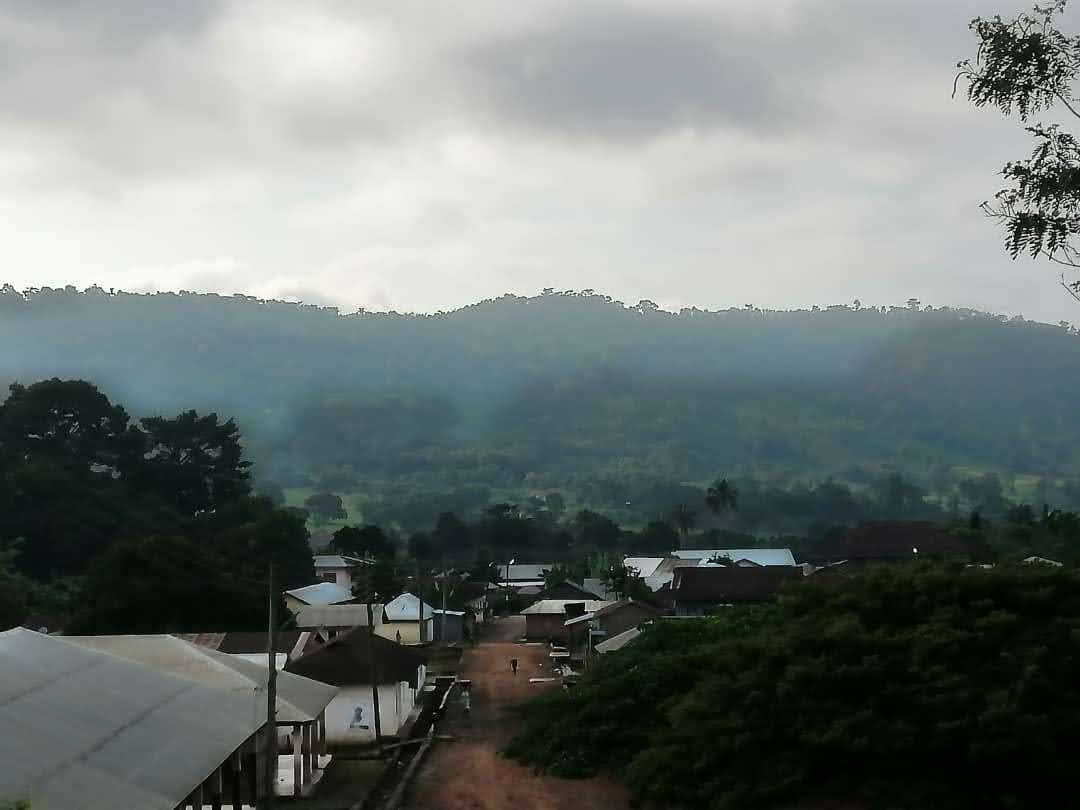
- Peki Dzake

- Location of Peki in Ghana
- Coordinates: 6°30′N 0°12′E
- Country: Ghana
- Region: Volta Region
- District: South Dayi
- Elevation: 490 ft (150 m)
- Time zone: GMT
  - Summer (DST): GMT
- Area code: 036

Peki is a town in the South Dayi District in the Volta Region of Ghana. It comprises eight subtowns, each with a subchief - Tsame, Avetile, Afeviwofe, Blengo, Dzake, Wudome, Dzogbati and Adzokoe. All of these subchiefs swear allegiance to a paramount chief known as Deiga. The current paramount chief is Deiga Kwadzo Dei XII. The town is known for the Peki Secondary School, the E.P Seminary and the government training college GOVCO. The school is a second cycle institution.

== History ==
Peki was first visited by Portuguese traders who sailed along the Gulf coast later named the Gold Coast when these forest inhabitants supplied hides, honey, ivory and later cotton and palm kernel.

Kwadzo Dei Tutu Yao II invited Reverend Lorenz Wulf of the North German Missionary Society to Peki. Wulf arrived on November 14, 1847, a date which is celebrated for the foundation of the Evangelical Presbyterian Church in Ghana. In 1848 he founded a school. Wulf provided a description of Peki:

The town consisted of three places. When I passed the first one (Dzake), it was the most beautiful African village I had ever seen, clean houses and a line of trees on both sides of the broad street. People shouted with joy and accompanied me in the hundreds. The same happened to me at the second place (Avetile).

== People ==
The population of Peki is composed predominantly of three sets of inhabitants. The first being a collection off gatherers, iron smelters, hunters and harvesters mainly autochthonous elements who bear the name Peki and occupied that forest grove located between two mountains ranges called Eyeto (sun mountain) and Akpato (fish mountain). This group forms and bears the name Peki and resided in caves and other fortresses within the area to be called Akwapim-Togo ranges. The ranges lying just about 80 miles North East of Accra and was accessed by few day's journey. The second group, in fact, most predominant segment of the population were Ewe migrants who claimed to have arrived from Glime or Notsie in present-day Togo. Their story was that they suffered under a wicked ruler called Agorkorli. These elements were on reconnaissance for their lost relations who deserted their fold when they migrated from Glime. The group formed part of the Gbe or Gbi segment of Ewe division. The lost elements were identified as the Gbeses of present-day Ga population in the capital city of Accra. The third group was mostly war survivors, fugitives, and renegade elements from other kingdoms like Akwamu, Akwapim, Asante, Dahomey, Kwahu and Denkyira. These elements introduced warfare, mercenary economy and brutality to the first and second groups who were mostly gatherers, iron smelters and farmers. These final elements organized the state to engage other adjacent states. Some of them worked to destabilize their home societies in brutal warfare in the 18th and 19th centuries.

== Language ==
The first autochthon elements speak a language today classified in Ghana as of Guan extract. Due to sparse numbers, friendly disposition and ability to learn, they learn the languages of arriving migrants quickly. Today, except for a few words, this language is extinct. The migrants who arrived with the language of the Kwara region of Adja Ewe quickly spread their dialect, and their language was adopted by Peki. The third group arrived with languages of other Guan, Kyerepong and Ga extracts. There were also minority communities residing on top of Akwapim-Togo ranges who joined the population of Peki with several mixes of languages. They sought refuge in the mountain ranges from other marauding tribes west of the Firao, or Amu also known as the Volta river. There were others with linguistic traits of Akan dialects. These combinations merged to create a type of Ewe language unknown within the region.

== The name Krepi ==
Krepi or Creppe is a Danish corruption of the actual name, Peki. Peki's political and military influence in the region resulted in the area being referred to as Krepi by various European powers in the region.

== Communities ==
There is ongoing debate about the communities that formed Peki. European explorers first classified all communities east of the Volta as Peki or Krepi/Krepe. This was later reduced to inland Ewe communities. The dominant role played by Peki over other Ewe and non-Ewe groups stretching into present day Togo however set Peki aside within the Volta until the first decade of the 20th century. The following communities and towns signed formal treaties as part of the Peki State and recognized Kwadzo Dei the King of Krepi as their lord in 1880; Boso, Awudome, Anum, Betekwase (Peki Wudome), (Peki Avetile), Tsito, Toseng, Kpalime, Abutia, Tonkor, Sokodei, Dzake, Adzokoe, Tsame, Tsate, Afefieve, Ziavi, Kwanta, Tsibu, Agovi, Siripo, Saviefe, Dadome, Atsoi, Valeme, Nyangbo, Kpandu, Dzibi, Nkonya, Adaklu, Goekpe, Waya, Madse, Avatime, Tanyigbe, Have, Dzolo, Kpedze, Taviefe, Todzikofe, Kpetoe, Ziokpe, Nyetoi, Agotime, Buem, and Nkabi (Nkawkubio). By the beginning of the 20th century, and after annulment of Asante-Akwamu hegemony in the area, these satellite towns who first sought protection of Peki began to assert their independence. Peki was there reduced to Metropolitan Peki composed of Blengo (capital; and residence of Kwadzo Dei the king of Peki), Anum, Boso, Avetile, Dzake, Tsame, Aƒeviwoƒe, Dzogbati, Seremase, Adzokoe, Anyirawase, Tsito, Aveŋui, Kwanta, Tsibu, Bame, Kpalime, Ɖoɖi, Toseng, Tonkor, Tsate, Kayera, Nkwakubio, To and Ʋegbe. Metropolitan Peki is now the only officially recognized Peki State presently with its administrative District Capital at Kpeve.

== European influence ==
Until the arrival of European on the Gold Coast, Kwadzo Dei the King of Peki administered the entire region. They kept close ties with their kith and kins; Gbeses at the Coast. From the Danish forts, Peki traded with the Europeans offering palm oil, kernel oil, ivory, hides, honey and cotton. Europeans brought fabrics, guns and gunpowder and drinks. Peki is located at the confluence of two major trading routes; Salaga to Christianborg Castle at Osu and Agou-Kpalime route to Fort Prinzenstein in Keta. The Pekis although not directly involved with trade taxed merchants plying these routes and also offered protection and security on the routes. Tax collected from merchants was invested in ammunitions and manufacturing of gunpowder essential commodities which Kwadzo Dei controlled within the region. Adequately armed, the state engaged in warfare against any rising state capable of being a threat to Peki. There were military engagements between Asante/Akwamu/Anlo forces against Peki in 1869–72. Danish traders who were operating at the coast sought protection of their wares from Peki and in turn rewarded Kwadzo Dei handsomely with sophisticated weaponry from Europe. In 1850, the Danes devised their interest in the Gold Coast to the British. Peki was specifically visited by Governors Winniet and Carstentein and the town was shown as one of the properties in exchange. After the transaction, the British were unable to impact Peki as the British did not have adequate resources. Kwadzo Dei thus remained an independent King for over thirty years until the scramble for Africa in mid-1885. By extension, Kwadzo Dei ruled over Krepi; areas deep into present day Togo singularly until the turn of the 20th century.

== Warfare ==
In 1826, Peki led a contingent under Akoto of Akwamu in the Akatamanso/Katamanso battle of Dodowa; a battle that broke the back of Kumasi and erased Asante's invincibility within the region. In spite of constant battles, there were trade and cultural exchanges among all these societies. Wars are declared by rulers. When Peki was first visited by Danish traders at the close of the 17th century, the society was seen as engaging in farming for most part of the year while spending the rest on mercenary warfare.

== The Norddeutsche Missionsgellshaft (The North German Mission Society) or The Bremen Mission ==
=== Background ===
This society established in the early part of the 19th century was inspired by the Pietist Movement and the Christian Awakening which occurred in the 17th and 18th centuries which were themselves outshoots of the Reformation which took place earlier in the 16th century. Their objective was to send European missionaries to other lands to establish the Christian faith among other peoples. On 10 June 1835 at Stade, The German Protestants had an open meeting where it was mooted to form a single North German Missionary Society to send out men into the world to spread the Gospel.

=== Missionary work ===
The Society had reasonable financial support and the General Meeting held in 1842 decided to open two mission fields in New Zealand and India. Later, West Africa was added and four young graduates from the Mission School; Lorenz Wolf of Bingen on the Rhine, 26 years old; Luer Bultman of Vahr near Bremen, 28 years old; James Graff of Jutland in Denmark, 32 years old; and Karl Flato of Horn near Bremen, 25 years old were sent to Africa to locate a suitable mission area, free from slave traders and where the climate was agreeable. By profession they were tradesmen: carpenters and leather and shoemakers. These men set out from Germany for their missionary endeavor on 17 March 1847. The first point of call of the missionaries was Cape Coast the hub of European activities in the Gold Coast where they landed on 5 May 1847. The Wesleyan missionary at Cape Coast, Rev. Thomas Birch Freeman received them well. After two weeks, Bultman and Wolf left for Gabon to explore the possibility of opening a station there. Their adventure proved abortive. Bultman died soon after their arrival in Gabon. Catholic work started in earnest before they got there and the French authorities ordered them out to nip in the bud any form of rivalry between the Catholics and the Protestants. Wolf returned to Cape Coast disappointed and having lost a colleague and only to learn that Karl Flato too had died in his absence. The group was left with only Graff and Wolf who were dismayed about the turn of events but not discouraged. Their next move was to look for a mission field of their own choice. Accordingly, when Wolf and Graff learnt that since 1828 the Basel Mission had settled at Christianborg which was about 100 miles west of Cape Coast, they left Cape Coast for Christianborg.

=== Arrival at Peki (Krepi) ===
Shortly before the arrival of the North German Missionaries to Christianborg, the Basel Missionaries had established a school at Osu near Accra. Attending that school was a Prince Nyangamagu, a son of Kwadzo Dei II, Tutu Yao, King of Krepi. When he heard that Wolf and Graff were searching for a place to start missionary work, Prince Nyangamagu assured them that his father, Kwadzo Dei II, a powerful King who ‘ruled over hundred of places’ would welcome them. He invited them to go with him to Peki. The Missionaries consented and the prince sent words home. He received a positive response. The King sent bearers (carriers) to Christianborg to bring the missionaries to Peki. Wolf set out on 9 November 1847, leaving Graff behind. Wolf's Missionary diary clearly gave us a picture into the events and scenes he beheld on the journey. November 13, 1847, Abutia, now we observed that we had reached Krepi country. We concluded this from the fertility of the land and from the cleanliness and diligence of the natives. November 14, 1847, in the morning at Anum. Thousands were assembled in the market place and welcomed me with music and shouts of joy. The Chief and his elders wanted to speak with us but as I was in hurry, I asked them to meet me later at Peki. First day at Peki: Tutu, when being informed of my arrival had ordered all people who were free from work to change the path leading from Anum to Peki about half an hour’s walk into a broad road so that I might walk in comfort. When I was not far from Peki, the King’s son whom I had seen at Accra with some of the confidants of the King met me on the way and said he had sent them to lead me home. I shook hand with him and greeted him. My reception and the welcome accorded to me by the people and the King at Peki was too glorious for a poor missionary. The town consisted of three places. When I passed the first one (Dzake) it was the most beautiful African village I had ever seen, clean houses and a line of trees on both sides of the broad street – people shouted with joy and accompanied me by the hundreds. The same happened at the second place (Avetile). The people went with me to the house of the King's son at Blengo where I was to lodge. I hardly sat down when two volleys of gun-fire greeted me. It was said Tutu had done this in order to honour me. After Rev Wolf's arrival in Peki, the German missionaries later moved further into Eweland to propagate the gospel. An important outpost for them was Keta where the mission work grew and expanded into the rest of Eweland. The missionaries arrival in Peki is the foundation of the Evangelical Presbyterian Church, Ghana

== Festival ==
The Chiefs and people of the Peki Traditional Area celebrate the Asafotudada festival annually to commemorate the sacrifices of their fore bearers who fought in wars to secure the present settlement of the Pekis and celebrate their bravery.

Gbidukor Festival is a festival that rotates between the Hohoe and Peki people.

== Institutions ==
- Peki Government Hospital
- Peki College of Education
- Peki Senior High School
- Peki Senior High Technical School https://pekisectech.org/

== Notable natives ==
- Ephraim Amu Pan Africanist, musicologist and educator
- Esther Afua Ocloo Industrialist and pioneer of microlending.
- Gilbert Ansre Linguist, Bible translation expert, academic and priest.
