= Academic stole =

Garment denoting academic achievement

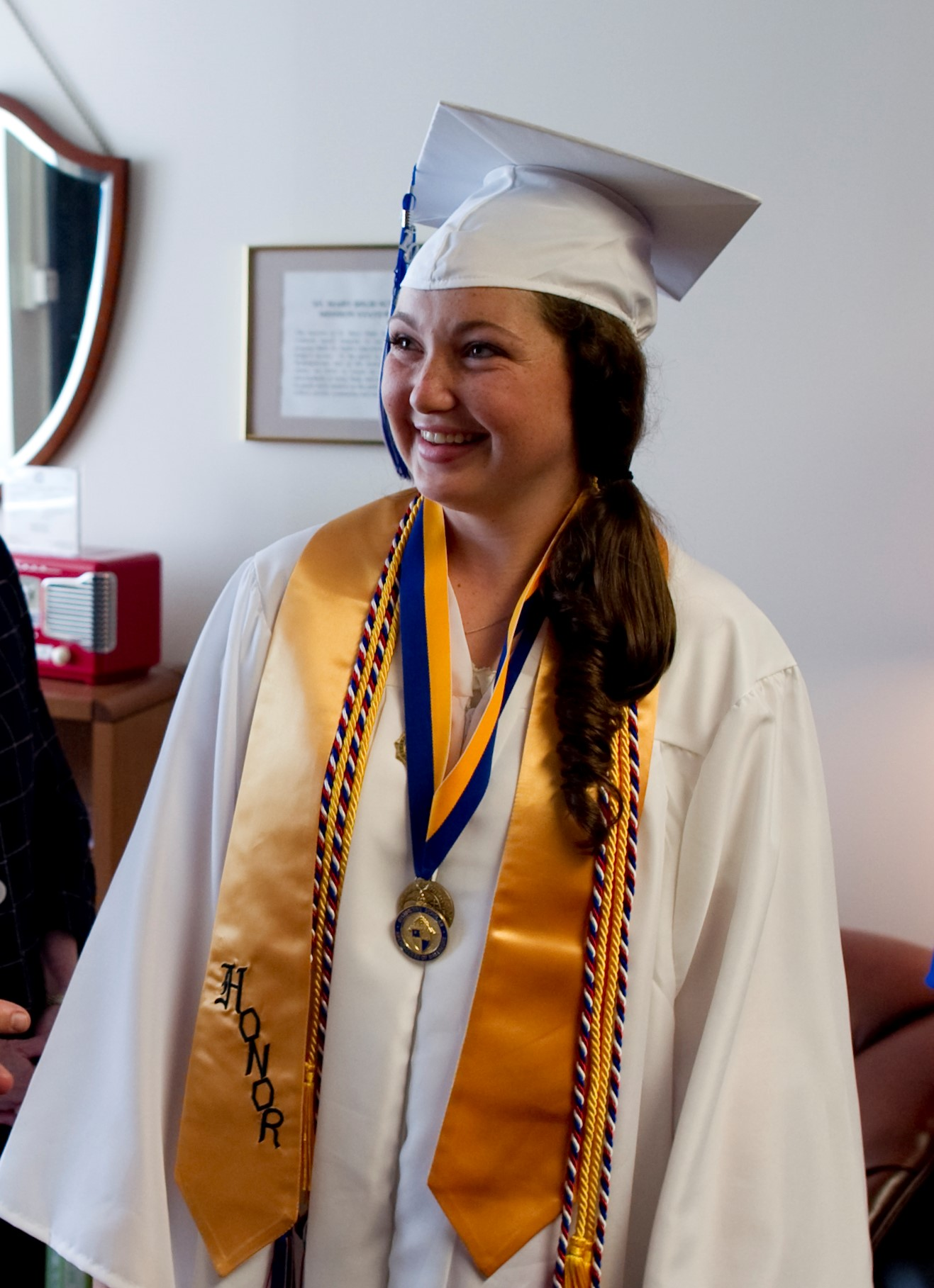
High-school valedictorian wearing gold academic stole (marked "honor")

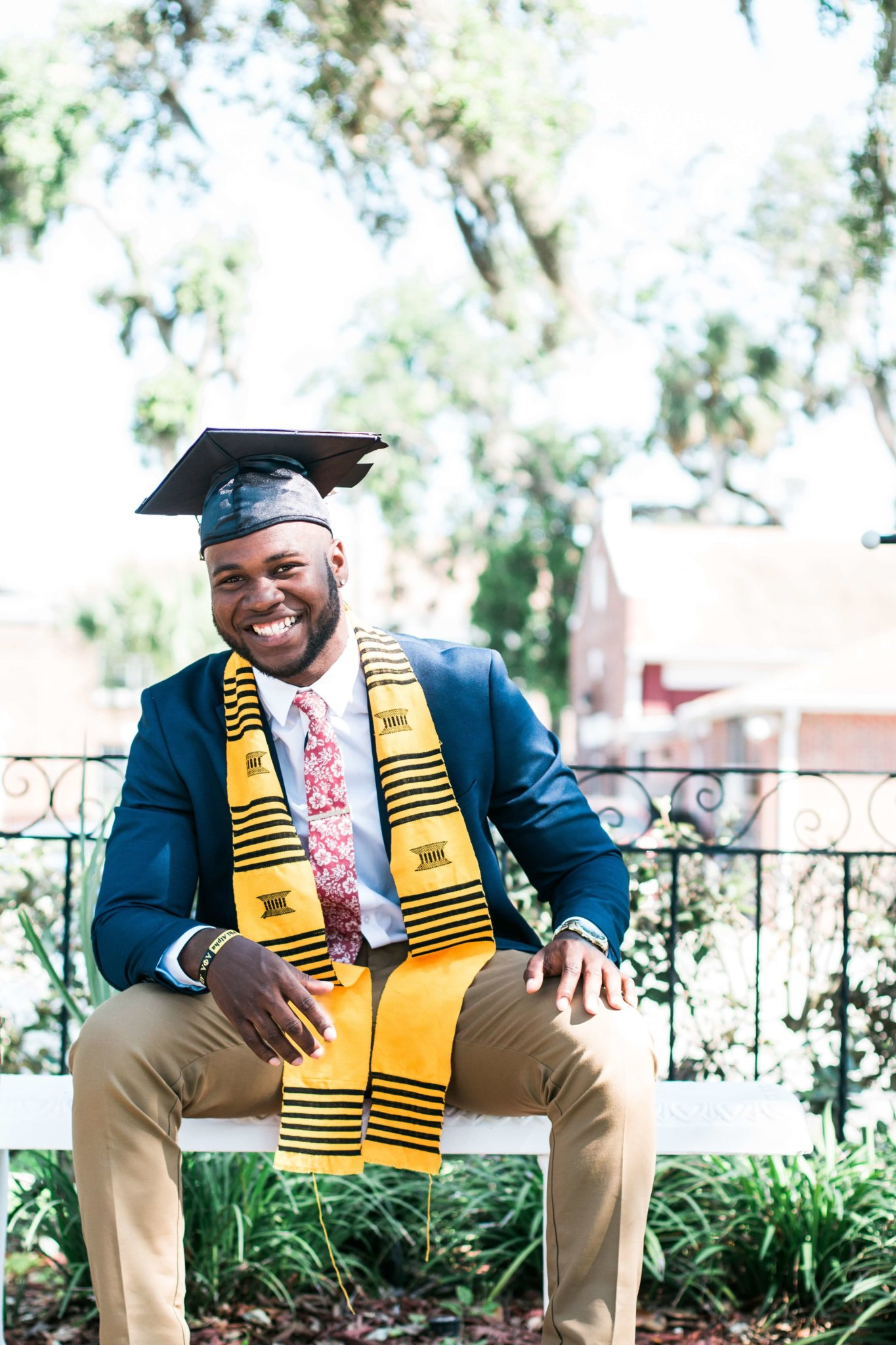
Kente stole worn by African-American graduate

An academic stole is a vestment used by various organizations to denote club involvement or academic achievement. Its use includes membership of a professional organization, a high school valedictorian award, and adorns the academic regalia representing some university and college courses.

A stole takes the form of a cloth scarf-like garment worn over the shoulders adorned with the awarding Society's colours and/or insignia. Though not a part of the officially recognised American Council on Education's Academic Costume Code, it has become common as part of the graduation attire at many high schools, colleges, and universities.

In many universities in the Commonwealth, particularly Australia, the stole is worn by graduates for qualifications lower or higher than the degree of Bachelor, such as Certificate, Diploma, Graduate Certificate, Graduate Diploma, Associate Diploma, Advanced Diploma and associate degree graduates. The color of the stole can either mean the general color for Degree, Diploma or Certificate graduates, or it can mean the Faculty of the award, e.g. dark blue might mean that the graduate has been awarded a Diploma or Certificate in the Arts Faculty.

Academic stoles made of kente cloth are often used by African Americans as a symbol of ethnic pride as are serape stoles worn by Latino graduates.

== See also ==
- Academic degree
- Robe
