= Agave people =

Ethnic group in Ghana

Agave
Regions with significant populations
- Ghana

Languages
- Ewe, French

Related ethnic groups
- Other Ewe groups

The Agave (also Crophy) are an ethnic group of Ghana, belonging to the Ewe people. They are mainly in the west of the Volta River and north of the Songhor Lagoon.

The Agave people are one of the largest Ewe subgroups. They live in the southern part of the Volta region of the republic of Ghana. Currently, they are located around the delta and estuary of the Volta River on both the east and the west banks. The Agave people have fifteen clans and are traditionally ruled by a paramount chief, surrounded by warrior chiefs.

Originally, they were part of the Agasuvi dynasty of the Adza Kingdom. Agave led the breakaway faction through many places including Ngortsie, Tsevie, Gafe, Agavedzi, Tsiame, Klidziand, and finally Agave Fedome. They brought the divine elephant Ivory Royal Stool from Adza to Agave which is the soul of the Agave people.

The Agave people are specialised in riverine and wetland activity. They share the same culture with the Ewes of Togo and Dahomey. Agave-Afedume which is located on an island has served as the spiritual and the ancestral home of the people of Agave. Sogakofe is one of the main commercial towns of the Agave people. Dabala which is about 35 kilometers from Sogakofe serves as the traditional head of the Kingdom of Agave. The Overlord of Agave lives in Dabala. The original land space of the Agave People spans from their current settlements sharing boundaries with Avenors all the way to Ningo including the Songor Lagoon. That explains why there are multiplicity of tribes in Ada-Foah today. One of the most popular festival of the Agave is Dzawuwu Festival which is held annually in February. It's a festival of cleansing. The Agave have spread to cover places such as Adidome, Mafi, Battor, Mepe, Aveyime etc. The Agave have been known for their bravery in time past till today. Kpotsonu which is one of the villages used to have a shrine where warrior like Gati from the Tsiela clan lived.
