= Asutsuare =

Coordinates: 6°05′N 0°12′E

- Town
- Interactive map of Asutsuare
- Country: Ghana
- Region: Greater Accra Region

Asutsuare is a town in the Greater Accra Region of Ghana. The town is located in the Shia Osudoku constituency, with its current member of parliament, Madam Linda Ocloo, doubling as the Greater Accra regional minister. The town is known for the Osudoku Secondary/Technical School. The school is a second-cycle institution. Economic activity is rice farming and key companies existing in Asutsuare include, Golden Exotics Limited (banana and poultry), Shinefeel Ghana Limited (tissue papers and plastics), China Fujian Finishing Ghana Limited (tilapia and fish feed), Lan-T Limited (Soy milk Beverages), Richland Agricultural Machines (Agricultural Equipment Service Providers), Agrokings Limited(Vegetables and Rice), TOP Sat (Agricultural Equipment Service Providers) and TOP Farms (Rice, Pepper, Cassava, Dairy Milk, Meat & Soybeans). Asutsuare is also home to a military training camp which the president of the republic promised to upgrade in 2025.

After Ghana's independence in 1957, the village of Asutsuare became the focus of state-led, socialist-inspired agricultural and industrial development. A sugar factory was built, along with a residential area, a sugarcane plantation, and an irrigation system. Twenty years its closure in 1980s, the plant was bought by Chinese investors. Today, it manufactures paper, plastics products, while the sugar cane plantation was repurposed for the farming of rice, bananas, and fish.

== Unsolved Incidents ==
On the 28th of June 2026, a diesel tanker caught fire at Asutsuare junction, even though the fire was brought under control by the Ghana fire service, the contents of the tanker was completely destroyed and one person believed to be the driver died in the fire whiles his assistant was rescued and is receiving treatment at Akuse hospital. The cause of the fire is under investigation as the time of this update.

In September 2022, residents and commercial drivers who reside and ply the Ause-Asutsuare-Osuwem and Volivo roads demonstrated to register their displeasure over deplorable roads in their communities. The protesters expressed dissatisfaction with successive governments for failing to upgrade their poor roads, which they say are negatively affecting their health, livelihoods, and general well being. The residents and commercial drivers burnt tyres and blocked sections of the roads, obstructing the free flow of traffic in the communities.

== Current Developmental Issues ==
As part of the construction of the Eastern corridor road, a 23.4 kilometers road is being constructed from Asutsuare - Volivo-, Aveyim to boast transportation and economic activities in the region. The 53 million dollars project is funded by the agricultural development bank commenced in December 2024 and has as at February 2025, it has affected over 200 farmers who will require compensation for the destruction of their farmlands. The MP for the area, madam Linda Ocloo has urged the contractor to provide compensation for the individuals since their livelihoods depends on their farms which are now destroyed.
