= Kobine Festival =

Festival in Ghana by the people of Lawra

The Kobine Festival is celebrated by the chiefs and peoples of Lawra in the Upper West Region of Ghana. The festival is celebrated in the month of September every year.
