= Gbidukor Festival =

Festival in Ghana by the Gbi people in the Volta region

The Gbidukor Festival is an annual festival celebrated by the chiefs and people of Gbi in the Volta Region of Ghana. It is usually celebrated in the month of November. It is claimed the festival rotates between Hohoe and Peki.

== Celebrations ==
During the festival, there is pomp and pageantry. The chiefs are carried in palanquins whiles there is drumming and singing. There is also the initiation of new development projects.

== Significance ==
The festival is celebrated to mark the exploits of the ancestors of the Gbi-Ewes. It also marks the period of family re-unions and the attraction of people both far and near.
