= Willa Festival =

Festival in Ghana by the Takpo people

Willa Festival is an annual festival celebrated by the chiefs and people of Takpo in the Nadowli district in the Upper West Region of Ghana. It is usually celebrated in the month of April. Others also claim it is celebrated in March.

== Celebrations ==
During the festival, visitors are welcomed to share food and drinks. The people put on traditional clothes and there is durbar of chiefs. There is also dancing and drumming. The colorful traditional attire of the community enhances festive spirit.

== Significance ==
This festival is celebrated to give thanks to their ancestral gods, ask for guidance and protection and pacification of gods of the Wilaa shrine.
