= Bonwire =

- Village
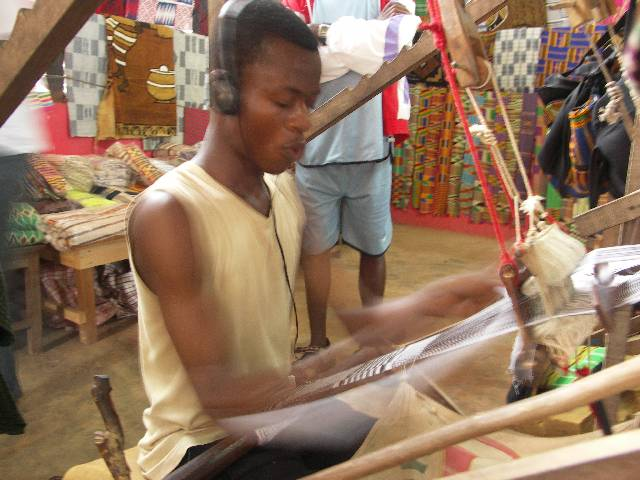
- A man weaves Akan Kente cloth using a traditional loom while listening to music, Bonwire village, Ejisu-Juaben Municipal District, Ashanti Region, Ghana.

- Location within Ghana
- Country: Ghana
- Region: Ashanti Region
- District: Ejisu-Juaben Municipal
- Elevation: 1,010 ft (308 m)

Population (2012)
  - Total: 10,756
- Time zone: GMT
  - Summer (DST): GMT

Bonwire is a town in Ghana, located in the Ejisu-Juaben Municipal district within the Ashanti Region. The town is located about 18 km on the Kumasi-Mampong road. According to Akan oral tradition, Kente originates from Bonwire.

== History ==
Oral history of Kente by the chief of Kente in Bonwire.

Bonwire is the home of the famous Akan Kente cloth. According to history, two friends from the town learnt how to weave by watching how a spider spun its web. The two brothers by name Kuragu and Ameyaw in around the middle of the 17th century were hunters by profession. They studied the spider's way and manner weaving its nest in the forest. After they did some experiments, they brought up with a type of fabric commonly known in the Asante-Twi as "Nwin-Ntom" meaning Woven-cloth in the English Language. They showed their discovery to the chief of Bonwire at that time called Nana Bobie Ansah. He accompanied them to Kumasi to show their invention to the King of the Ashanti Otumfuo Opemso Osei Tutu I. The King was interested by this discovery and adopted it as a royal art. "Gagamuga" was the first cloth that was made. Years later, the two brothers improved the form of their discovery. This new form had the looks of the surface of a basket locally known as "Kenten". The people of the town called the new design, (Kenten-Nwin-Ntoma), a woven-basket-cloth. It was later corrupted to Kente. The new King of the Asantes called Otumfuo Okatakyie Opoku Ware created a Kente-stool for the two brothers after they reported the improved design to him in 1721.

== Kente Museum ==
In October 2020, the vice president of Ghana, Dr Mahamudu Bawumia, cut the sod for the commencement of construction of the Bonwire Kente Museum. This was to facilitate the mass production of kente for export and as an avenue for job creation.

== Education ==
Bonwire is also known for the Bonwire Secondary Technical School. The school is a second cycle institution.

== Gallery ==
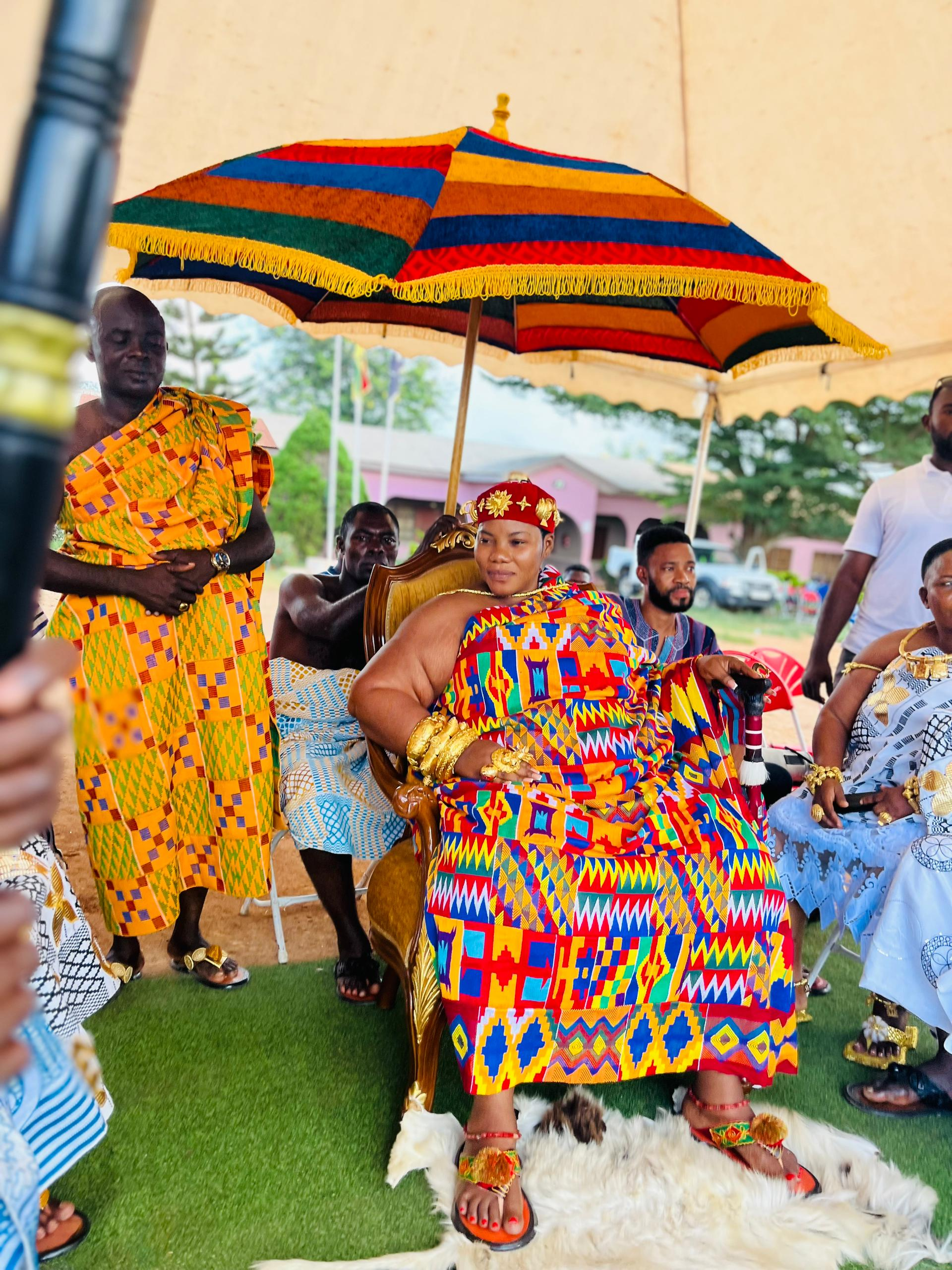
Image_of_2024_Bonwire_Kente_Festival_2

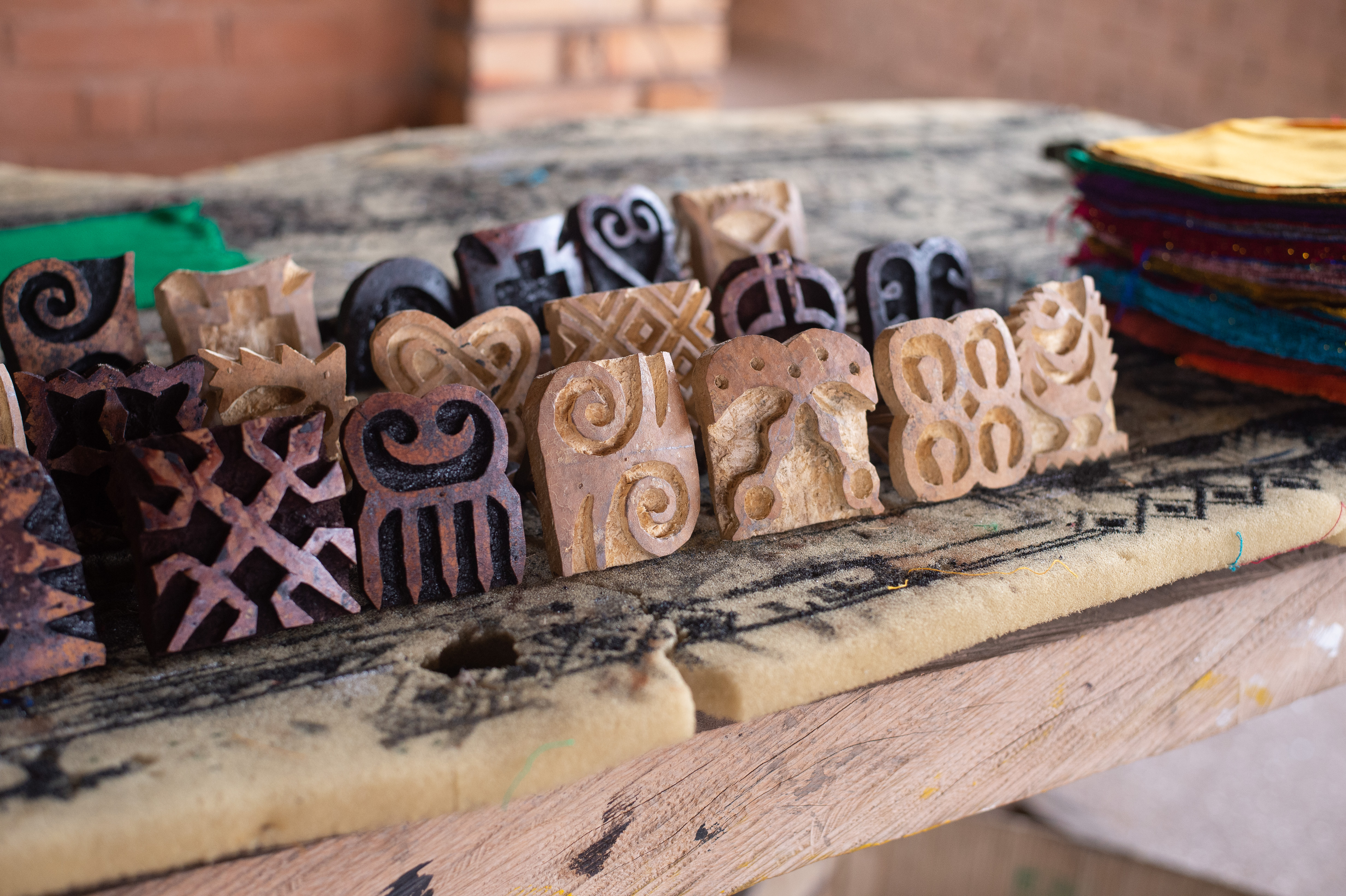
motifs

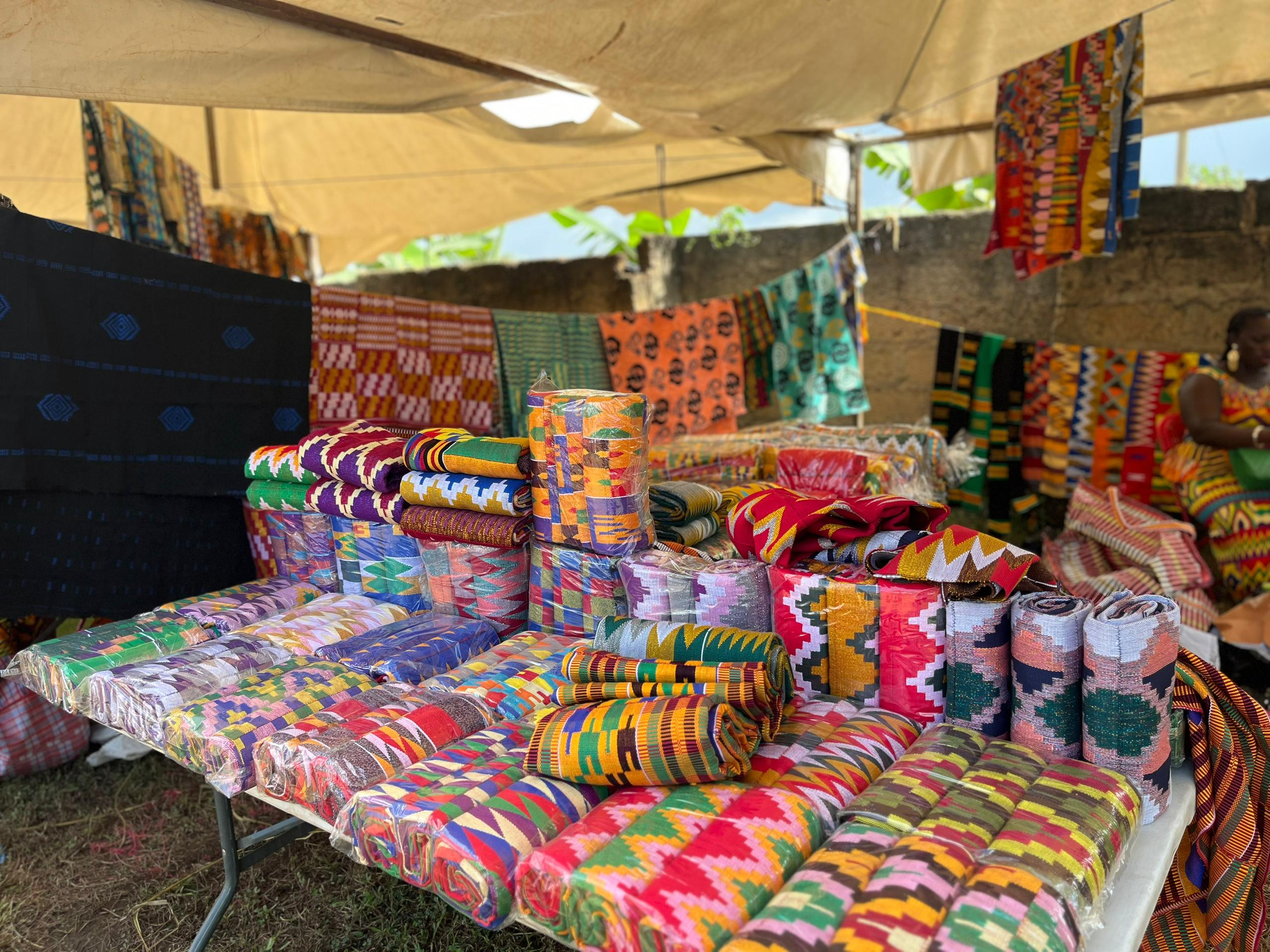
bonwire Kente Cloths
