= Sasadu Festival =

Festival in Ghana by four communities in the Volta region

Sasadu Festival is an annual festival celebrated by the chiefs and people of the Sasadu communities of Alavanyo, Akrofu, Saviefe and Sovie. It is located in the Hohoe Municipality in the Volta Region of Ghana. It is usually celebrated in the month of October on rotational basis. SASADU is an acronym for Sovie, Alavanyo, Saviefe, Akrofu Development Union which marks the symbol of unity and peace among the four communities.

== Celebrations ==
During the festival, there is a grand durbar of chiefs as it is a festival of pomp and pageantry.

== Significance ==
It is celebrated to rekindle the fraternal relationship existing between the four communities who claim to be of the same stock who migrated from Notsie in Togoland.
