= Eddie Festival =

Festival in Ghana by the people of Wassa

Eddie Festival is an annual festival celebrated by the chiefs and people of Wassa in the Western Region of Ghana. It is usually celebrated in the month of January in Wassa Amenfi. In Wassa Fiase, it is known to be celebrated in September. The Festival closely associated with the commemoration of the dead and begins on a Thursday. That Thursday is marked as a day of fasting with feasting beginning the next day, Friday. The Feasting is maintained for a period of one week. In Wassa Amenfi particularly, drums are beaten at the cemetery. Sacrifices are also made to family stools and stools, drums and houses sprinkled with a mixture of yam, palm oil and eggs (Etor).

== Celebrations ==
During the festival, visitors are welcomed to share food and drinks. The people put on traditional clothes and there is durbar of chiefs. There is also dancing and drumming. The occasion is also used to share gifts as well as the purchase and airing of new garments.

== Significance ==
This festival is celebrated to mark an event that took place in the past. The festival fosters unity among the local people and brings about peace in the area. It also enforces planning for the development of projects.
