= Akwantutenten Festival =

Festival in Ghana by the Worawora people

The Akwantutenten Festival is an annual festival celebrated by the chiefs and peoples of Worawora in the Jasikan District in the Oti Region of Ghana formally Volta region who are Akans. It is usually celebrated in September.

== Celebrations ==
During the festival, there is a grand durbar of chiefs where they sit in state and receive homages from their subjects. People all over and other Akans come to the Worawora township to show off their best. A ritual of cleansing and pacification of stools and shrines are done in black wear.

== Significance ==
This festival is celebrated to mark the exodus of the people of Worawora who migrated from Kuntunase in the Ashanti-land to their current abode. The festival involves a pilgrimage to their former settlements up the hills where they overlook the hills at which foot where their present settlements location.
