= Nkyidwo Festival =

Festival in Ghana by the Essumeja people in Ashanti region

Nkyidwo Festival is an annual festival celebrated by the chiefs and peoples of Essumeja in the Bekwai District in the Ashanti Region of Ghana. It is usually celebrated in the last Monday in November or the first Monday in December.

== Celebrations ==
There are performances of durbar by the traditional leaders and rituals at a place in the Asantemanso forest which was claimed to be the origin of the ancestral Asantes. The people invoke the gods for blessings, prosperity and protection.

== Significance ==
It is celebrated to mark the appearance of the first seven Asante ancestors who were claimed to have come from a huge hole in the ground, marking the Ashanti origin. It was also claimed it happened on a Monday night and they were followed by a dog and a lion.
