= Kpini Chugu =

Festival in Ghana by the Northern Regions

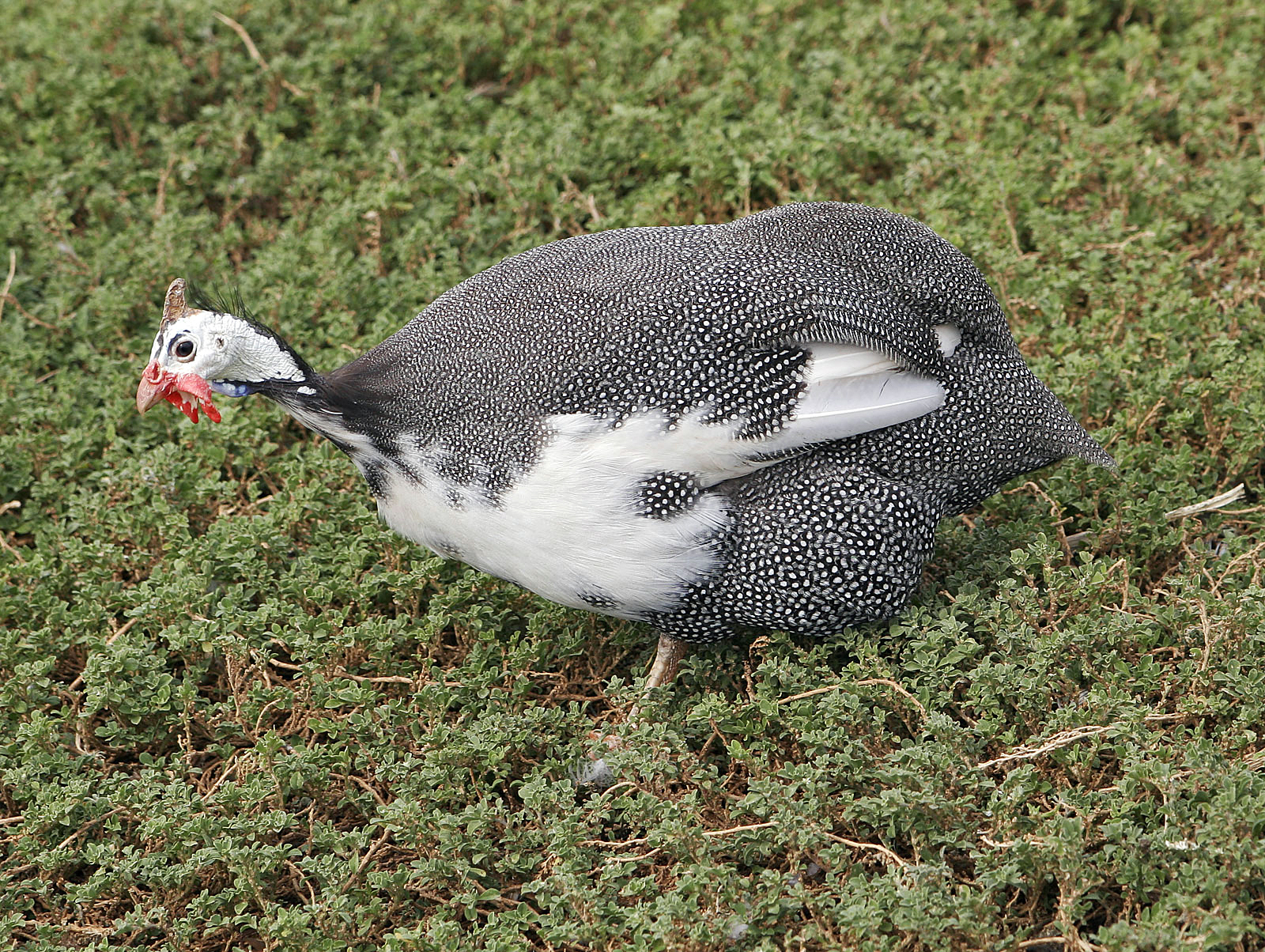
Guinea fowl

Kpini Chugu, which means Guineafowl Festival in Dagbani, is a minor festival celebrated on the fourth month after Damba in Northern region of Ghana. It is observed in the Dagbon, Mamprugu and Nanung traditional areas. Naa Zangina is known to have been the initiator of this festival. The guineafowl is more than just a bird in the Northern Region of Ghana.

History Behind Kpini Chugu

This festival as stated earlier was initiated during the reign of Naa Zangina. Naa Zangina according to oral history was the one who brought Islam to Dagbon. The ancient folklore states that during the time of the Prophet Mohammed, he was on a journey in the desert and along the way he ran out of water and he was virtually dying with thirst.

In his frantic search for water which is a scarce commodity in the desert, he encountered a guineafowl flying overhead and water dripped on him. He quizzed the guineafowl where it got the water from but the guineafowl refused to show the prophet where it had gotten the water. Subsequently a different animal came by and showed the prophet where the water was.

So as a form of punishment for the guineafowl, it was decided that the guineafowl would be slaughtered for refusing to show the prophet the location of the water. Before it is slaughtered, a few feathers are plucked off it and it's given a few stripes of lashes using small fig while proclaiming "A daa moŋ ti anabi kɔm" in dagbanli which literally translates as you denied our prophet water after which it is slaughtered and used for a feast.
