= Asafua Festival =

Festival in Ghana by the people in Sekondi

Asafua Festival is an annual festival celebrated by the chiefs and people of Sekondi in the Western Region of Ghana. It is usually celebrated in the month of June.

== Celebrations ==
During the festival, visitors are welcomed to share food and drinks. The people put on traditional clothes and there is durbar of chiefs. There is also dancing and drumming.

== Significance ==
This festival is celebrated to purify the divinity of Asafua.
