= Mmoaninko festival =

Festival in Ghana by the people of Offinso

- Frequency: Every 4 years
- Locations: Offinso, Ashanti Region
- Country: Ghana

The Mmoaninko festival is celebrated by the chiefs and peoples of Offinso in the Ashanti Region of Ghana. The festival is celebrated every 4 years.

== Celebrations ==
There is traditional drumming and dancing by the durbar of chiefs in the midst of merry-making and funfair. There is also firing of musketry.

== Significance ==
It is celebrated to mark the bravery and wisdom of Nana Wiafe Akenten I. It was claimed he chose a piece of land instead of jewelry when he was rewarded by Nana Osei Tutu I after the war against the Dormaas of the former Brong Ahafo region in Ghana. The land granted is what makes up the present day Offinso Municipality.
