= Ayimagonu Festival =

Festival in Ghana by the people of Dofor

The Ayimagonu Festival is an annual festival celebrated by the chiefs and people of Dofor Traditional Area in the North Tongu District. It is located at a few kilometers east of Juapong in the Volta Region of Ghana. It is usually celebrated in the month of November.

== Celebrations ==
There is a grand durbar of chiefs during the festival. Activities such as pouring of libations and chiefs riding in palanquins in the midst of singing war songs. There are pomp and pageantry activities too. The chiefs also sit in state while their subjects pay homage to them.
