= Kpini Kyiu Festival =

Festival in Ghana by the people of Wa

Kpini Kyiu Festival is an annual festival celebrated by the chiefs and people of Wa in the Upper West region of Ghana. It is usually celebrated in the month of January.

== Celebrations ==
During the festival, visitors are welcomed to share food and drinks. The people put on traditional clothes and there is durbar of chiefs. There is also dancing and drumming.

== Significance ==
This festival is celebrated to mark an event that took place in the past.
