= Jintigi Festival =

Festival in Ghana by the Gonjas

Jintigi (Fire) Festival is an annual festival celebrated by the chiefs and people of Gonja Traditional Area in the Savannah Region, formally the Northern region of Ghana. Damongo which is the capital of Gonjaland serves as the epicenter of the festival. It is usually celebrated in the month of April.

== Celebrations ==
During the festival, there is procession at night with torches at the outskirts of the towns and villages and into the bush within the Gonjaland. Qurans are also recited to forecast the coming year.

== Significance ==
The festival is celebrated to commemorate the search of a lost son of an ancient king.
