= Kakube festival =

Festival in Ghana by the people of Nandom

Kakube Festival is celebrated by the people of Nandom in the Upper West Region of Ghana. The festival is celebrated to show gratitude to the gods for their protection and guidance throughout the farming season and also to mark the end of the farming season. It’s also a time when the people of Nandom traditional area rekindle relationships, and exhibit their rich traditions and culture.

== Significance ==
This festival is celebrated to thank family gods and ask them to bless the soil, protect the people during the farming seasons.
