= Paragbeile Festival =

Festival in Ghana by the people of Tumu

Paragbeile Festival is an annual festival celebrated by the chiefs and people of Tumu in the Upper West Region of Ghana. It is usually celebrated in the month of January and February.

== Celebrations ==
During the festival, visitors are welcomed to share food and drinks. The people put on traditional clothes and there is durbar of chiefs. There is also dancing and drumming.

== Significance ==
This festival is celebrated to mark an event that took place in the past.
