= Mount Adaklu =

Mountain in Ghana

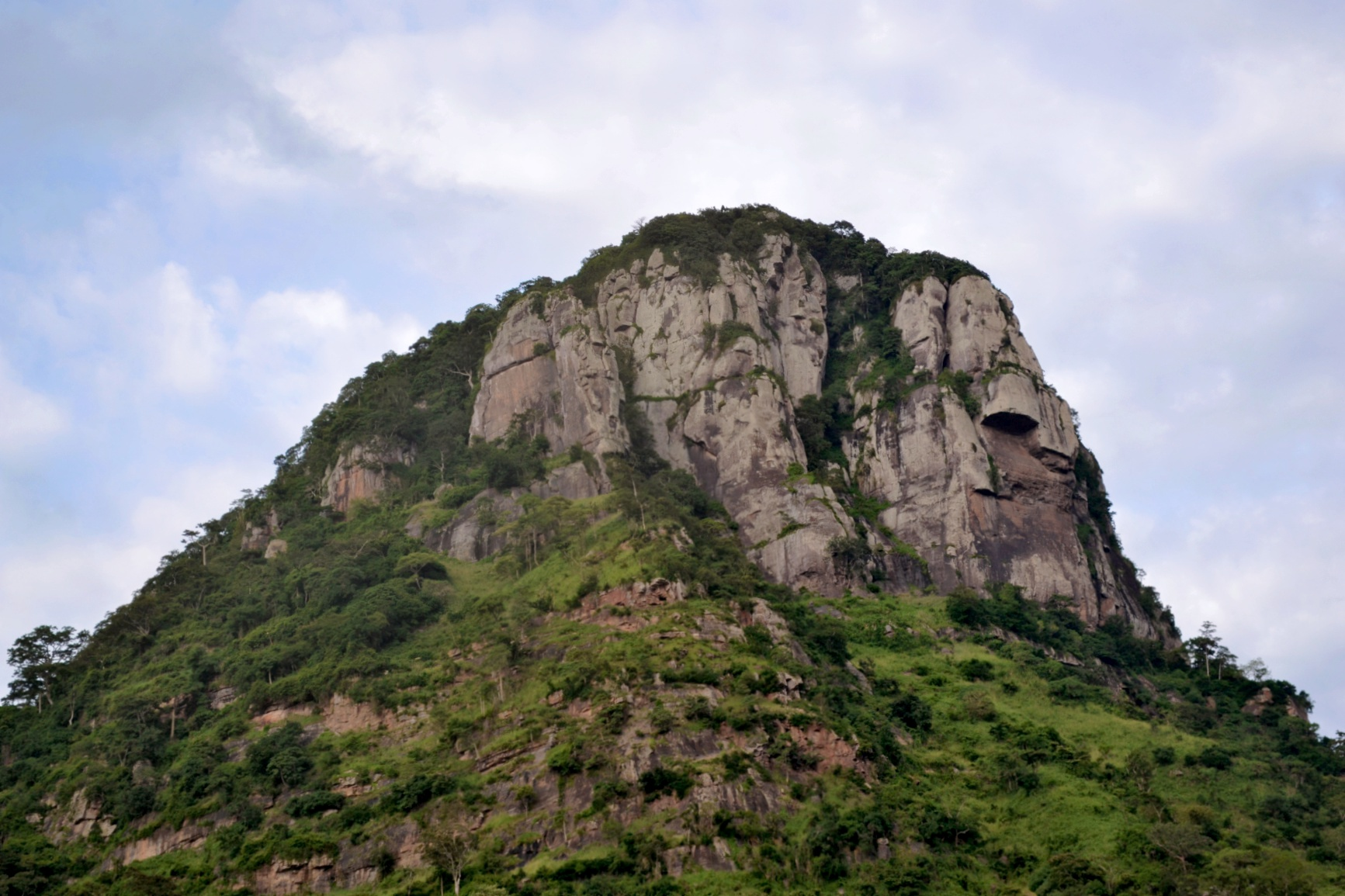
- Adaklu mountain

Highest point
- Elevation: 580 m (1,900 ft)
- Coordinates: 6°29′45″N 0°29′45″E

Geography
- Location within Ghana
- Location: Adaklu District, Volta Region, Ghana
- Parent range: Agumatsa Range

Mount Adaklu is a mountain situated 12 km from Ho in the Volta Region of Ghana. It is one of the highest in Ghana at about 580 m above sea level and is venerated by the inhabitants of nearby villages of the Ewe ethnic group. The mountain is surrounded by nine villages, some of which are Helekpe, Avanyaviwofe, Goefe, Sikama, Abuadi, and Kordiabe. Kordiabe is located about a quarter way up the mountain, and is a convenient resting place when climbing the mountain from the Helekpe path.

== Tourism ==
Tours of the mountain are organized for tourists, and the profits derived from them are invested in the community.

Directly below the summit is the village of Helekpe, which provides hospitality, with a guest house and guides who lead tours to the summit of Adaklu and show and explain aspects of local life in the countryside. While most people in the village speak the local language of Ewe, there are many that understand and can communicate in English as well.

Adaklu is noted for its wild bees, palm wine and local gin, better known as akpeteshie.

== Nearby attractions ==
Three kilometers from the foot of the mountain is the Kalakpa Resource Reserve. Local fauna include kob, African Buffalo, harnessed bushbuck, olive baboon, hooded vulture, pied crow, rainbow agama and many other species.

== Mudslide ==
In August 2017, rocks from the mountain destroyed farms belonging to residents of Helekpe.

In May 2026, a mudslide carrying debris from the mountain after a rainfall destroyed properties in Helekpe.

== Gallery ==
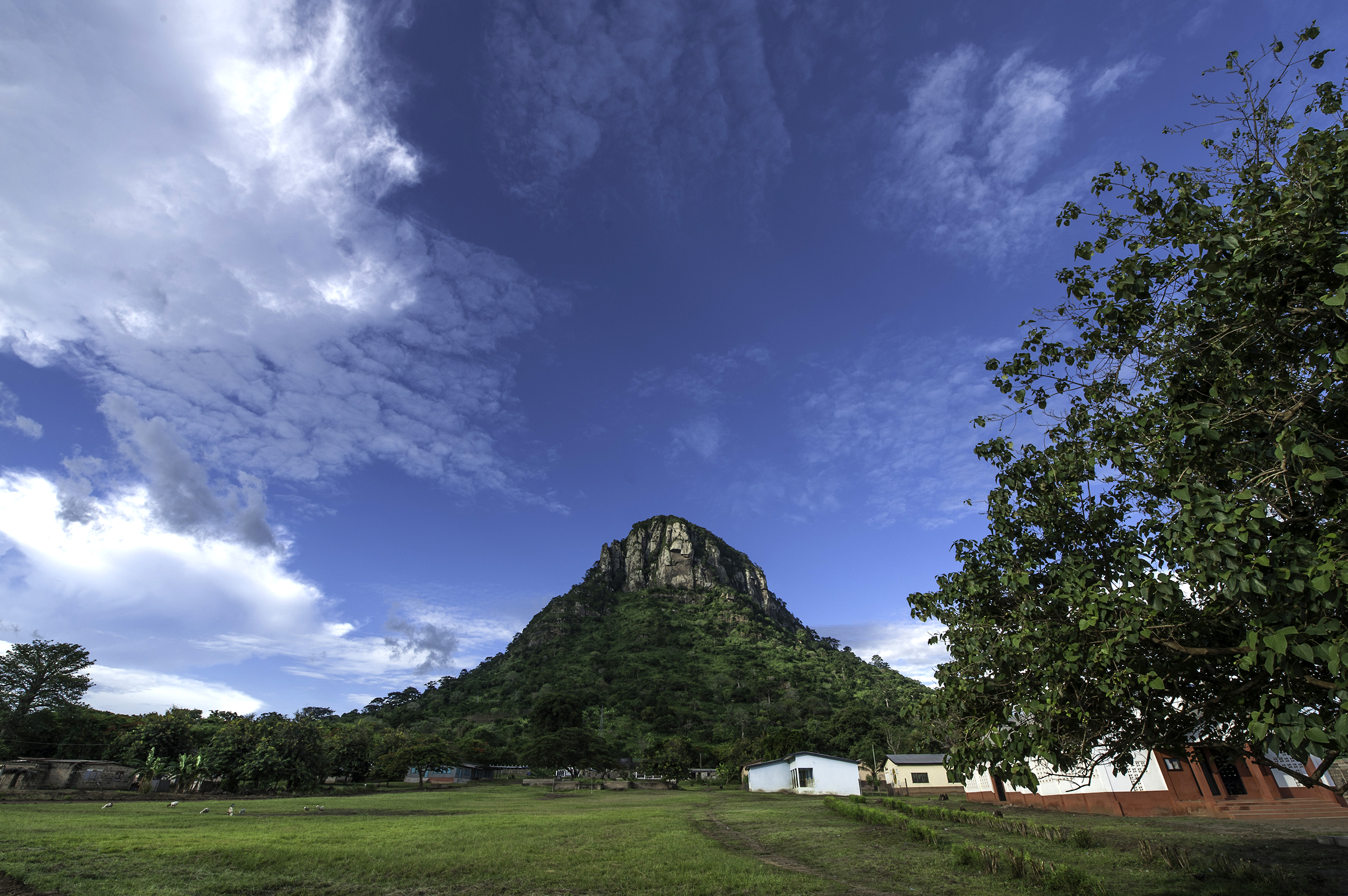
Adaklu mountain seen from the Sogakope-Ho road

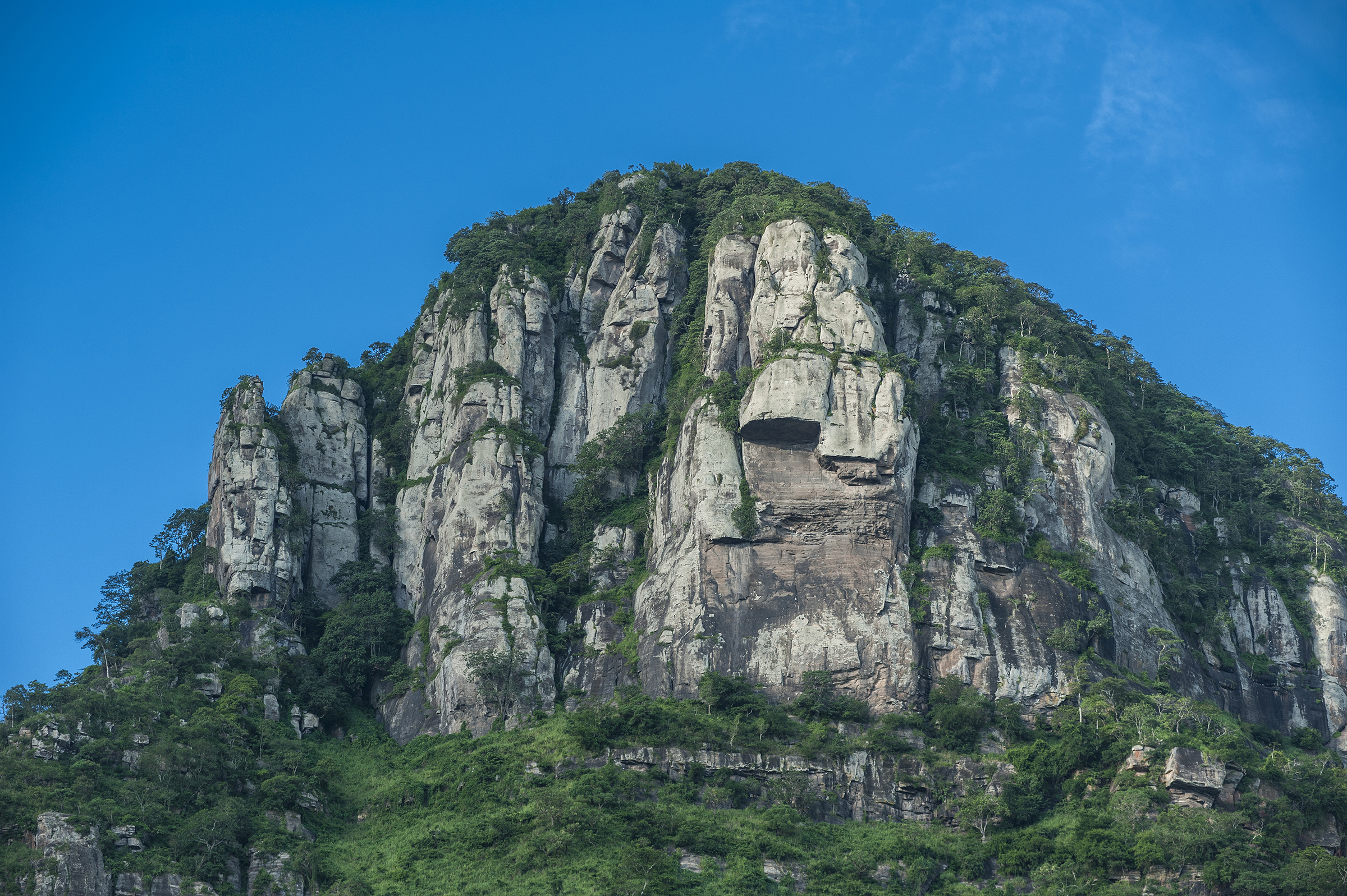
Adaklu mountain in the Adaklu District, Volta Region

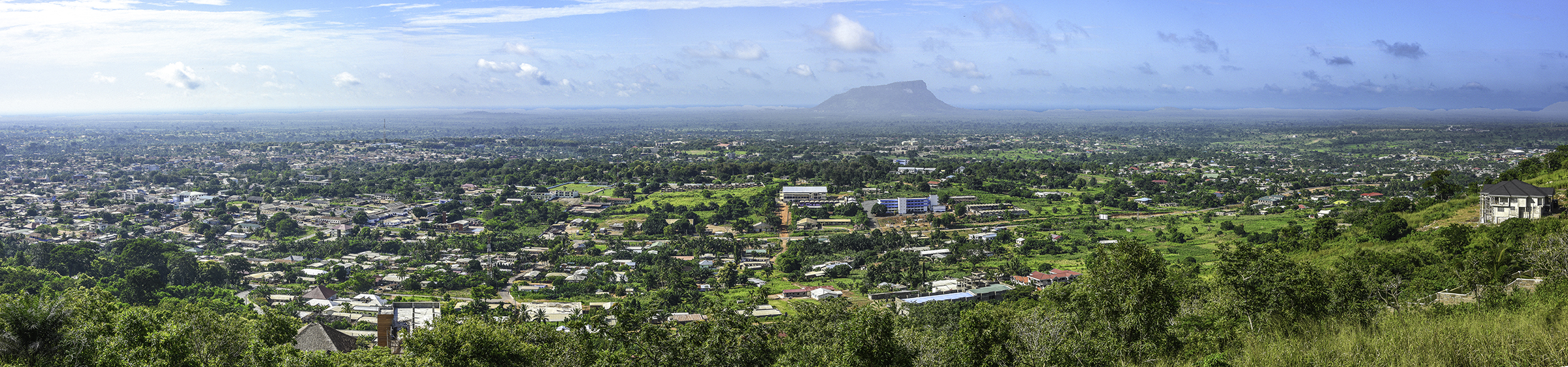
Ho with Adaklu mountain in the background

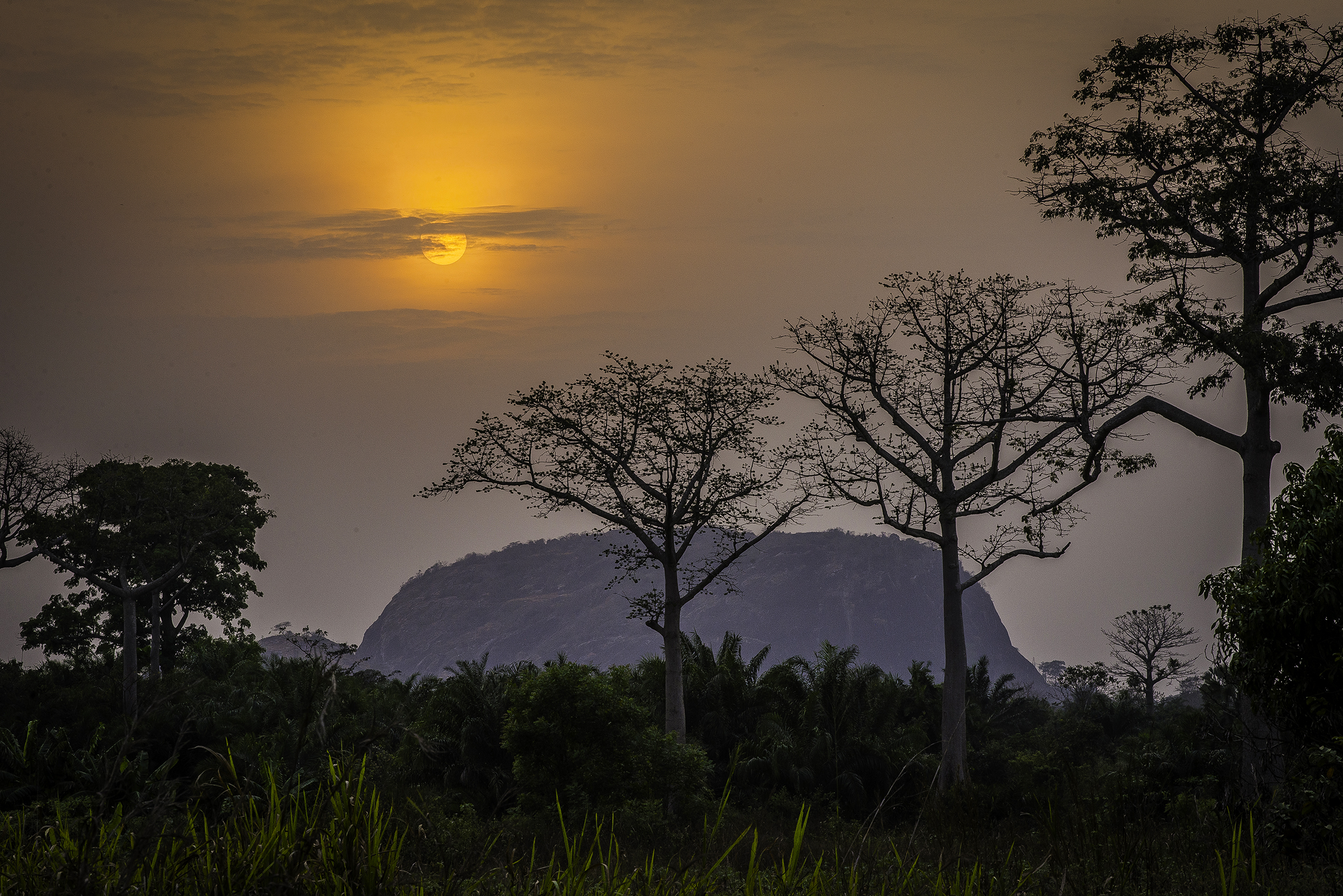
Sunset over the Adaklu mountain in the Volta Region
