= Asafotufiam Festival =

Festival in Ghana by the people of Ada

The Asafotufiam Festival is celebrated by the chiefs and peoples of Ada in the Danube East of the Greater Accra Region of Ghana. The festival is celebrated in the first week of August every year.

== Etymology/origin ==
The word ‘Asafotufiam’ comes from the word ‘Asafotufiami’ which in Dangme means ‘Divisional Firing of Musketry’. The name "Asafo-tu-fiam" consists of three-word name components.

The 1st component is "Asa" which is the plural of "Sa", a noun. The original name "Sa", which is sometimes called "Osa", "Asa" or "Aesir", means the spirit body of the Supreme Divine Creator of the Universe. According to the Ga-Adamgbes, the name "Osa" or "Asa" is what has been corrupted to Osiris. "Osa" was a Black Nubian man who was once worshipped in the world. He is one of the Holy Ancestral Divinities of the Ada people.

The 2nd component is "Tu". "Tu" is the name given to a gun or a pistol in the Danube.

The name "Tu" or "Tutu" means Spiritual Body Soul. The name "Tu" or 'Tutu" is the divine name of the conductor of the Ancient Nubians' Osa's Spiritual Doctrine. The full name of "Tu" or "Tutu" is "Tutu-Ani" who is also known in some cultures as the scribe "Ani".

The 3rd component is "Fia" or "Fiam" which means to slap or to shoot or shot at or Shooting. "Tu-fia" or "Tufiam" literally means gun shooting.

"Asafotufia" or "Asafotufiam" translates literally as, "The ordained Osa spiritual doctrine practitioners gun shooting".

The "Asafotu" are companies of warriors who fire their muskets in celebration.

== History ==
The Adangmes fought a lot of wars in a bid to establish a territory for their people. Most famous among these wars are the Katamanso War of 1826, the Glover war of 1876, the invasion by the Anglos in 1770 and the battle of Nonobe in 1750. The people of Ada managed to withstand all these attacks and survived the wars, leading to the successful establishment and survival of the Ada kingdom. As the wars became frequent, rituals were put in place to welcome brave soldiers and war heroes back home. Some of these rituals included feet washing and the firing of muskets to announce their arrival.

In the 1900s, with no wars to be fight or attacks from other tribes, the rituals performed to welcome their brave soldiers were abolished as they were no longer needed. The people however, still felt the need to put in place a festival to celebrate their soldiers, ancestors and past chiefs who all contributed to the successful establishment of Ada. This paved the way for the establishment of the Asafotufiam Festival, as a replacement for the welcoming rituals performed for returning soldiers.

To re-enact the historic events of the Ada people, the "warriors" dress in traditional battle attire and stage a mock battle. It is also a time when the young men are introduced to warfare.

There are two Asafo (companies) within the Ada State, namely, Akomfode and Asorkor, membership of which according to tradition is by matrilineal lineage.

== Celebration ==
According to tradition, the celebration starts from Thursday in the first week of August with the arrival of sons and daughters, well wishers and guests from other places to the town. The Thursday is devoted for house cleaning ceremony and pouring of libation at the respective shrines of the various families as well as keeping of vigil.

At dawn on Friday, the two companies (Asafo) beat their respective drums to summon their members for the onward march to Luhuese which is on the outskirts of Big Ada where they are compelled.

According to ancient custom, all young men who attain puberty age are then initiated into their respective Asafo companies by teaching them how to handle, load a gun and fire same for the first time.

This is followed by war formation and the initiates being taught the ancient tactics of warfare. This continues until late afternoon when they return to Big-Ada dressed in traditional military attire and clad with leaves and palm branches signifying conquering heroes returning from the war fronts amid firing of musketry and war cries.

Singing, firing of musketry and dancing continue until sunset when the procession continues to "Kpomkpo-Panya" (the place which served as the departing point for warriors going to wars as well as the landing point for soldiers returning from wars) where the Asafo companies form a single file along the riverside and fire three consecutive volleys into the river, dip their feet into it and wash their hands to indicate the carrying away of all evil and bad omens of the years and looking forward to all the good in store for the years ahead. All the followers of the Asafo companies follow the custom of feet dipping and hand washing ceremony. The procession then disperses and everyone retires to their homes amid songs of jubilation.
