= Dzawuwu Festival =

Festival in Ghana by the Agave people in Dabala

Dzawuwu Festival is an annual traditional and thanksgiving festival celebrated by the chiefs and people of Agave Traditional Area in Dabala in the Volta Region of Ghana. It is usually celebrated in the month of February.

It is one of the most important cultural and religious observances of the people of Agave, combining thanksgiving, purification, remembrance of ancestors and the reaffirmation of traditional authority.

The name "Dzawuwu" is gotten from the Ewe language. According to recent scholarly research on Agave religious traditions, "Dza" refers to a food offering or sacrifice, while "Wuwu" means sprinkling or ritual distribution. Therefore, the festival denotes the ritual offering of food to ancestral spirits and deities as an act of thanksgiving and purification. Even though the name proposes "sprinkling", the ritual often involves sharing sacred foods among the various Agave clans rather than actually sprinkling it.

According to traditional accounts, the Dzawuwu Festival began with the establishment of the Great Ivory Stool of Agave, together with the Gborble and Adzemu traditional religious institutions. these institutions became the traditional and political foundation of the Agave State and continue to play an important role in the festival's observance. Overtime the ritual cleansing and ritual offerings made to these sacred objects became the Dzawuwu Festival. The festival strengthens the relationship between traditional leaders, religious beliefs, and the ancestors while promoting unity among the Agave people.

== Celebrations ==
During the festival, special portions of food are sprinkled to the gods of the people for protection. Libations are poured and the people renew their loyalty to their rulers. The celebration also feature drumming, dancing, cultural performances, and a grand durbar of chiefs and queen mothers.

== Significance ==
It is celebrated to mark the bravery of the Agaves in the past who fought and won several wars. It is the time to pay homage to those who have departed. The festival also is a thanksgiving celebration in which the people express gratitude to God, the gods, and their ancestors for protection, guidance, and blessings received throughout the year. It again reinforces the people's loyalty to the Paramount Chief and traditional leadership and promote unity among Agave communities in Ghana and among those living in the diaspora.
