= Opemso Festival =

Festival in Ghana by the Ashantis

The Opemso Festival is a biennial festival held in Ghana to commemorate the iconic birth of Otumfuo Osei Tutu I, the first king of the Ashantis. The title Opemso, first given to Otumfuo Osei Tutu I, is given to Ashanti kings to indicate a fearless and persistent nature in executing plans without giving in to any obstacles.

During the festival, events that led to Tutu's birth are mimicked until the final rites are performed in the Teneabasaso or Kwantakese sacred grove where he was born at Kokofu-Anyinam in the Ashanti Region of Ghana. The sacred grove is called Teneabasaso because it is said that the mother of Otumfuo Osei Tutu I held the branches of the Ceiba tree in pushing hard to deliver him. The sacred grove is sometimes also called Kwantakese because the Ashanti people assert that the road to where their monarch was delivered is a great path.

== Historical background ==
The Opemso festival is celebrated to mark the events that led to the birth of the first king of the Ashanti people, Otumfuo Osei Tutu I who is credited to have united the seven Akan clans to form the Asante Kingdom.Oral tradition has it that Nana Gyamfua Manu Kutusi, the mother of Otumfuo Osei Tutu I, desperately needed a child but her efforts proved futile after experiencing several miscarriages. Finally, a traditional priest at Awukugua in the Akuapim district in Eastern Region of Ghana who serves the Tutu deity helped her spiritually to conceive a male child. When his birth was due, Osei Tutu’s mother journeyed to his grandmother’s hometown at Esiase in the Ashanti Region. Unfortunately, on her way, the birth pangs increased. She then solicited for spiritual help from the Kaakawere River at Kokofu-Anyinam and promised her of a fowl as well as a bottle of schnapps after her safe delivery. The river deity helped her by redirecting some three hunters to come to assist her. They took her to the then queenmother of Kokofu-Anyinam who took her to a safe spot under a big Ceiba or Onyina tree that is now called Onyina Sei. It was on a Friday, hence his name Kofi.

== Observance ==
The festival is observed once every two years. The festival is very important to the Ashanti people because the birth of the king gave the Asante people hope of freedom from the Gyamans and Denkyiras. During the festival commemoration, thousands of Ashantis and their kings led by the Asantehene or his representative walks via the street to the sacred grove where their first king was born. Special rituals as well as offerings of fowls and schnapps are offered to the Kaakawere river on their way. The jubilant crowd of residents and visitors then wait at the entrance of the sacred grove for the traditional priests, chiefs and elders in the traditional council of Anyinam-Kokofu to perform the required rituals in the sacred grove since it is a taboo for non-royals to enter the grove. Dramatic episodes of the events that occurred prior to the birth of the Ashanti king are staged with some residents playing the role of the three hunters and so forth. After a successful performance, drumming, dancing, merry making continues. A beauty pageant dubbed "Miss Opemso" as well as singing and dancing competitions, cooking, traditional cloth wearing competition and a cultural knowledge quiz on proverbs are carried out as part of the event. These performances are used as a means of reviving the cultural values of the Ashantis while teaching children and visitors the rich cultural heritage of the Ashanti people.
