= Edina Bronya Festival =

Festival in Ghana by the Elmina people

The Edina Bronya Festival is an annual harvest festival celebrated by the chiefs and peoples of Elmina in the Central Region of Ghana. The festival is a novel Christmas during the Dutch era of the colonial period. It is usually celebrated in the first Thursday of January every year.

== History ==
After the Portuguese suffered defeat in the hands of the Dutch in 1627, they introduce a form of 'Christmas' locally known as Bronya to the local people. It coincides with the Dutch Festival and signifies the relationship between the people of Elmina and the Dutch.

== Celebrations ==
Families and friends get together to celebrate with merry-making and eating. On the eve of the festival, shots are fired at midnight by the Paramount Chief to usher into the New Year. The Paramount Chief rides in a palanquin on the following day. Sheep are slaughtered in front of the Elmina castle.
