= Odambea Festival =

Festival in Ghana by the people of Saltpond

Odambea Festival is an annual festival celebrated by the chiefs and people of Nkusukum Traditional Area in Saltpond in the Central Region of Ghana. It is usually celebrated in the month of August. It is also celebrated by the people of Anomabo. "Odambea" means "fortified link" in the local language.

== Celebrations ==
During the festival, visitors are welcomed to share food and drinks. The people put on traditional clothes and there is durbar of chiefs. There is also dancing and drumming.

== Significance ==
This festival is celebrated to commemorate the migration of the Nkusukum people from Techiman in formally Brong Ahafo region to their present settlement. The festival also features the re-enactment of the ancient lifestyles of the people of the area.
