= Kloyosikplem festival =

Festival in Ghana by the people of Somanya

The Kloyosikplem festival is celebrated by the chiefs and peoples of Yilo Krobo (Somanya) in the Eastern region of Ghana. The festival is celebrated in the month of November every year.

The festival was instituted in 1992 and it’s gaining more coverage with participants across Somanya.

The term ‘Kloyosikplem’ means "descent from Krobo mountain," is a term that recognises its historical significance. For the Krobo people, Krobo mountain has great cultural and historical significance. It was both their home and a place of sacred ritual for centuries.
