= Adaklu =

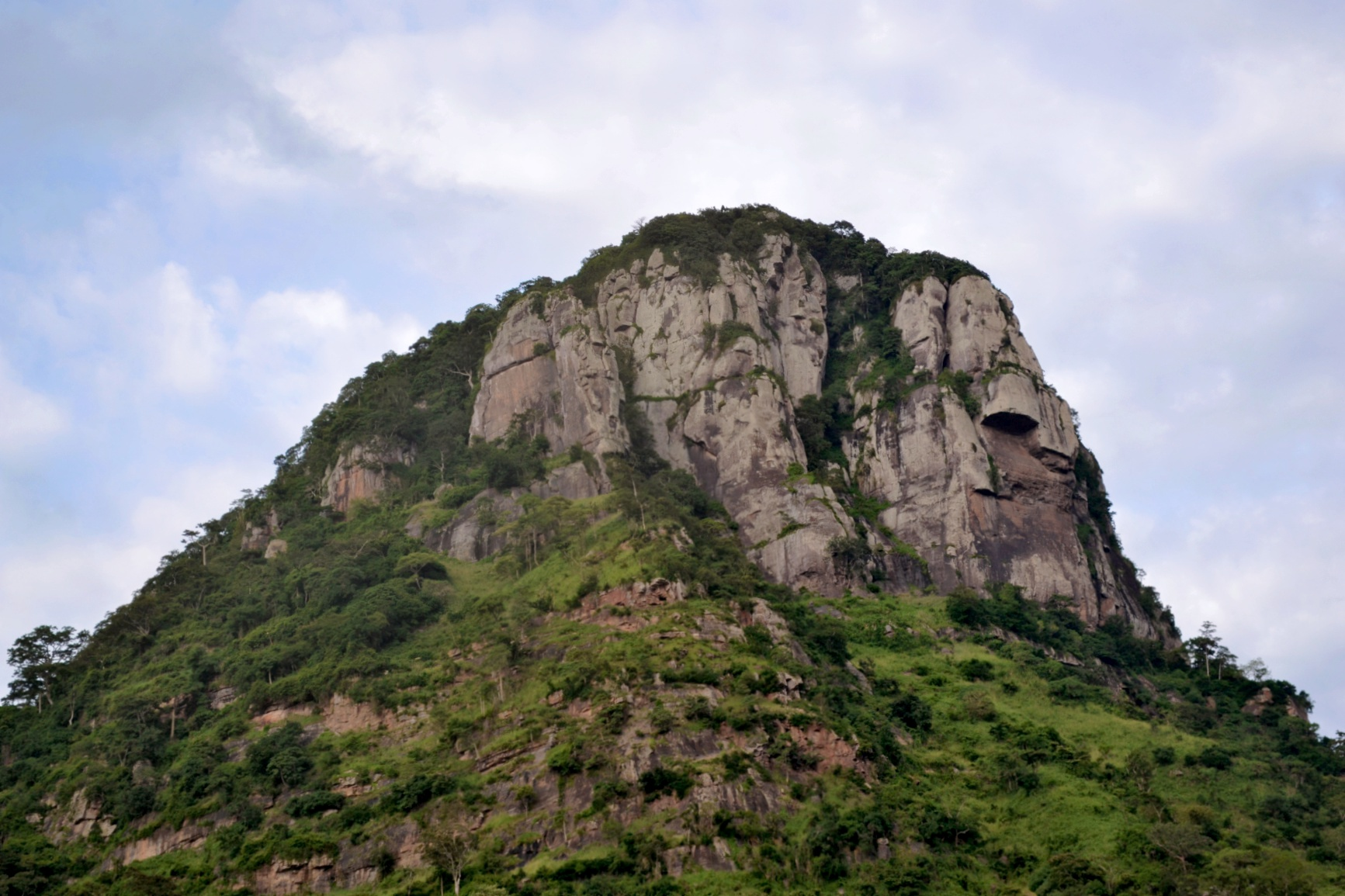
- A view of Adaklu Mountain, Ghana.
- Interactive map of Adaklu
- Coordinates: 6.2991°N 0.5476°E
- Country: Ghana
- Region: Volta Region

Adaklu is a town in the Adaklu District of Volta Region of Ghana. The town is known for the Adaklu Commercial Secondary School. The school is a second cycle institution.
