= Kente cloth =

Ghanaian textile

Kente is a Ghanaian textile, officially recognised as a geographical indication of Ghana to safeguard its authenticity and origin. It is made of hand-woven strips of silk and cotton. Historically, the fabric was worn in a toga-like fashion among the Asante, Akan and Ewe people. According to Asante oral tradition, it originated from Bonwire in the Ashanti Region of Ghana. In modern-day Ghana, the wearing of kente cloth has become widespread to commemorate special occasions, and kente brands led by master weavers are in high demand.

Due to the popularity of kente cloth patterns, mass-produced prints with the kente patterns have become widespread throughout West Africa, and by extension the whole of Africa. Globally, the print is used in the design of academic stoles in graduation ceremonies, worn mostly by African Americans as well as the African Diaspora.

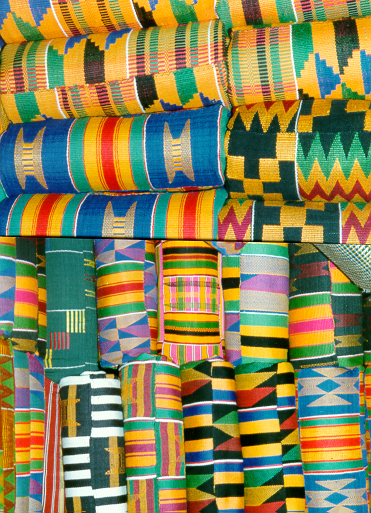
Kente cloth, the traditional or national cloth of Ghana, is worn by the Akan

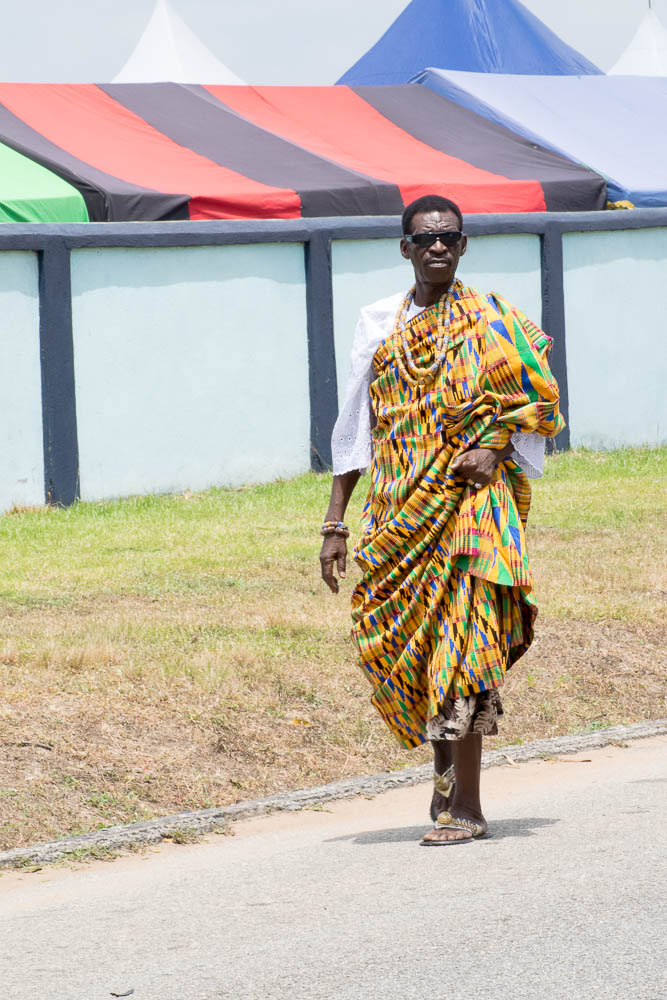
A man wearing kente cloth

== Etymology ==
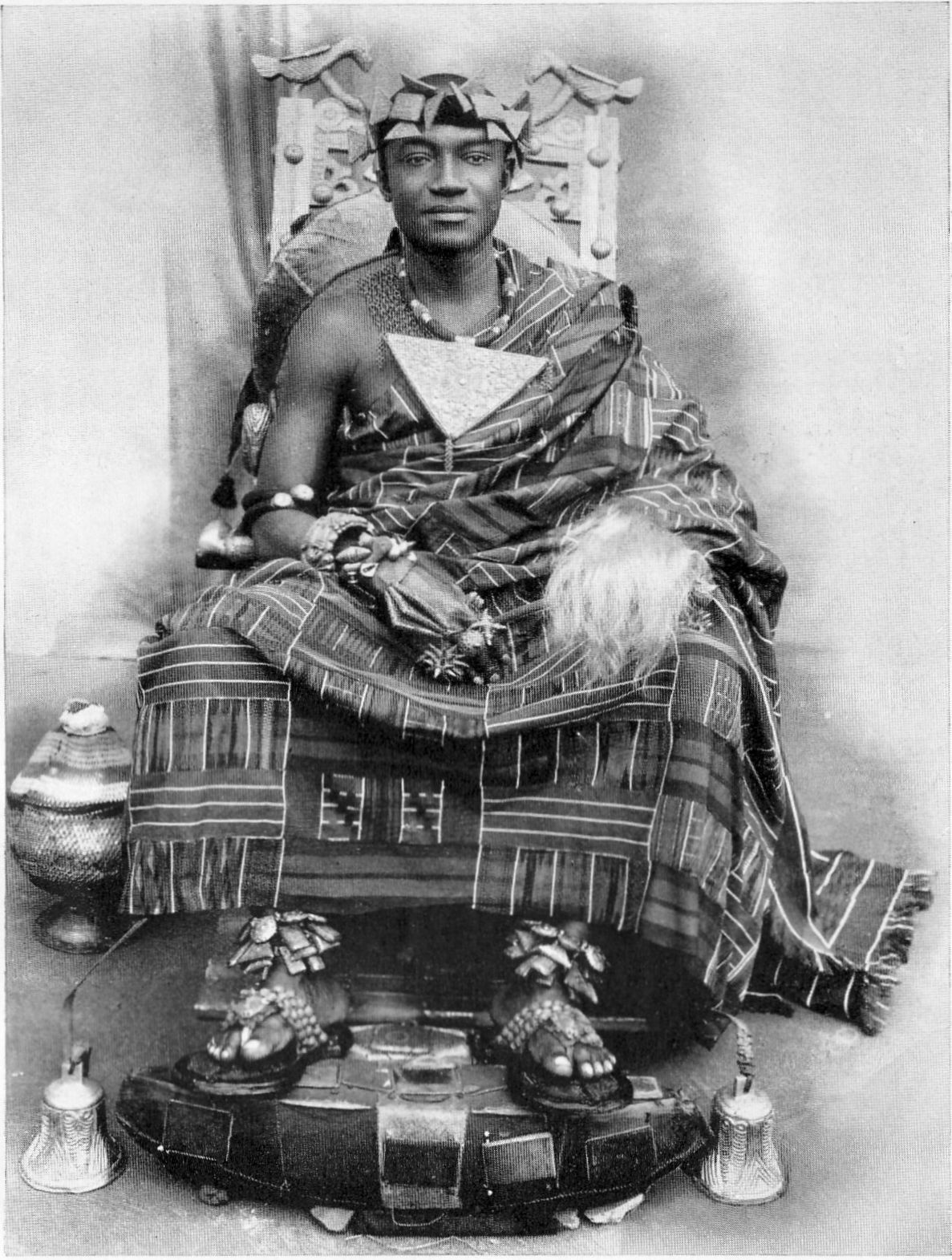
Ashanti king Prempeh II wearing kente

Kente comes from the word kɛntɛn, which means "basket" in the Asante dialect of the Akan language, referencing its basket-like pattern. In Ghana, the Akan ethnic group also refers to kente as nwentoma, meaning "woven cloth". Ashanti folklore includes a story where weavers invented kente by seeking to replicate the patterns of Anansi the spider.

== History ==
Archaeological evidence for the oldest form of handloom weaving in Southern Ghana has been discovered at Begho and Bono Manso. Spindle whorls and dye holes discovered in these sites have been dated to the 14th–18th centuries. At Wenchi, spindle whorls have been dated to the 16th–17th centuries.

Asante oral tradition give the origins of Kente to an individual from Bonwire who introduced a loom among the Asante from Bono Gyaman during the reign of Nana Oti Akenten in the 17th century. Another oral source states that it was developed indigenously by individuals from Bonwire during the reign of Osei Kofi Tutu I, who were inspired by the web designs of a spider. It is plausible that early Asante weaving took influence from the Gyaman region, although likely in times previous to when oral traditions relate, these early cloths of blue and white cotton stripes bear striking resemblance to Bondoukou cloths and some others in West Africa. However the colorful cloths that came to be known as Kente were an Asante innovation made by dyeing cloths and unraveling imported cloths of silk from various different places and weaving them into many different patterns with different meanings.

In the 18th century, Asantehene Opoku Ware I was documented by Danish agents Nog and L.F. Rømer, to have encouraged expansion in craft work. The Asantehene set up a factory during his reign to innovate weaving in the Ashanti Empire. This was the early stages of Kente production. The Danish agents described the operations of the factory as:

Some of his subjects were able to spin cotton, and they wove bands of it, three fingers wide. When twelve long strips were sewn together it became a "Pantjes" or sash. One strip might be white, the other one blue or sometimes there was a red among them...[Asantehene] Opoke [Ware] bought silk taffeta and materials of all colours. The artists unravelled them.

— Nog.

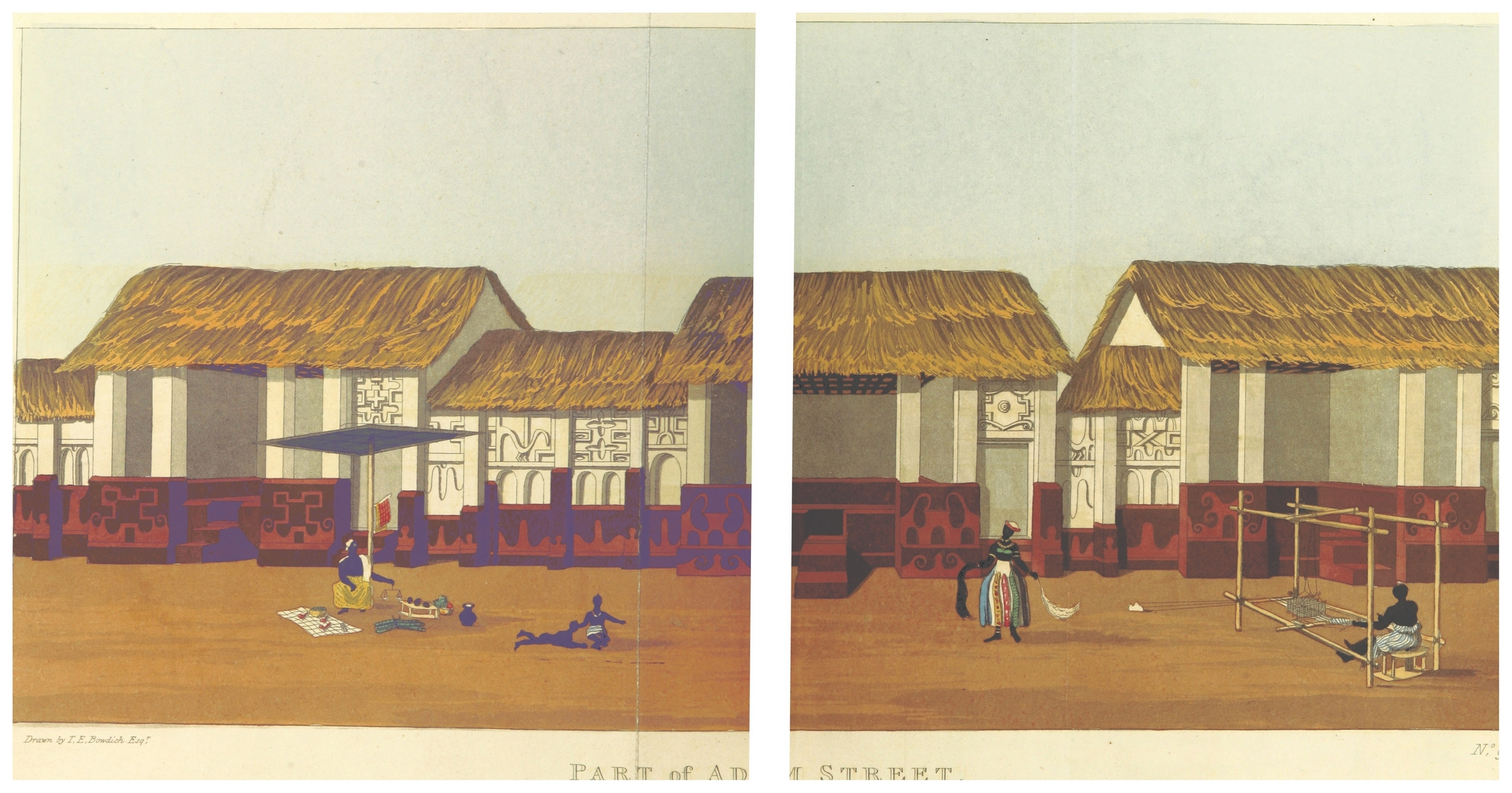
Kente Weaver on Adum Street in Kumasi, Ashanti Empire, 1819

By the late 18th and early 19th centuries, Kente made out of silk was fully developed in Ashanti. In 1817, Thomas Edward Bowdich noted that weaving in Ashanti had progressed to an extent that cloths were made "in all the varieties of colour, as well as pattern, [and] they were of an incredible size and weight." The word "Kente" might have been applied by the Fante traders to Ashanti fabrics.

Oral history of Kente: The Ewe perspective.

Ewe version of Kente is made out of double-woven bands. According to oral tradition, Ewe weaving goes back to the 16th century when weavers were among the migrants who resettled in Ghana from Benin Republic and Western Nigeria. In the 18th century Keta became the centre of weaving among Ewe migrants who had settled in Southern Ghana. The earliest description of weaving among the southern ewe was from a report in 1718 by a Dutch West India Company official during his visit to Keta. By 1881, weaving was a prominent industry among the northern Ewe who had migrated north of the Volta River.

In December 2024, Kente cloth was recognized by UNESCO as an Intangible cultural heritage.

== Production ==
Oral history of Kente: The Akan perspective.

Kente production can be classified by three versions: authentic kente cloth made by traditional weavers, kente print produced by brands such as Vlisco and Akosombo Textile Ltd, and mass-produced kente pattern typically produced in China for West Africans. Authentic kente cloth is the most expensive, while kente print varies in price depending on the production style.

For authentic kente, the towns of Bonwire, Sakora Wonoo, Ntonso, Safo and Adawomase are noted for kente weaving, and are located in the Ashanti region.

=== Tools used in Kente weaving ===
Weaving is done on a wooden loom in which multiple threads of dyed fabric are pressed together. Weavers are typically apprenticed under a master weaver or company for a number of years before producing their own patterns. Rolls of cloth are then imprinted with a brand to signify authenticity.

Gender has an influence on cloth production. Weaving kente is traditionally considered a male practice.

== Characteristics ==
There exist hundreds of different kinds of kente patterns. Kente patterns vary in complexity, with each pattern having a name or message by the weaver. Ghanaians choose kente cloths as much for their names as their colors and patterns. Although the cloths are identified primarily by the patterns found in the lengthwise (warp) threads, there is often little correlation between appearance and name. Names are derived from several sources, including proverbs, historical events, important chiefs, queen mothers, and plants. The cloth symbolizes high value.

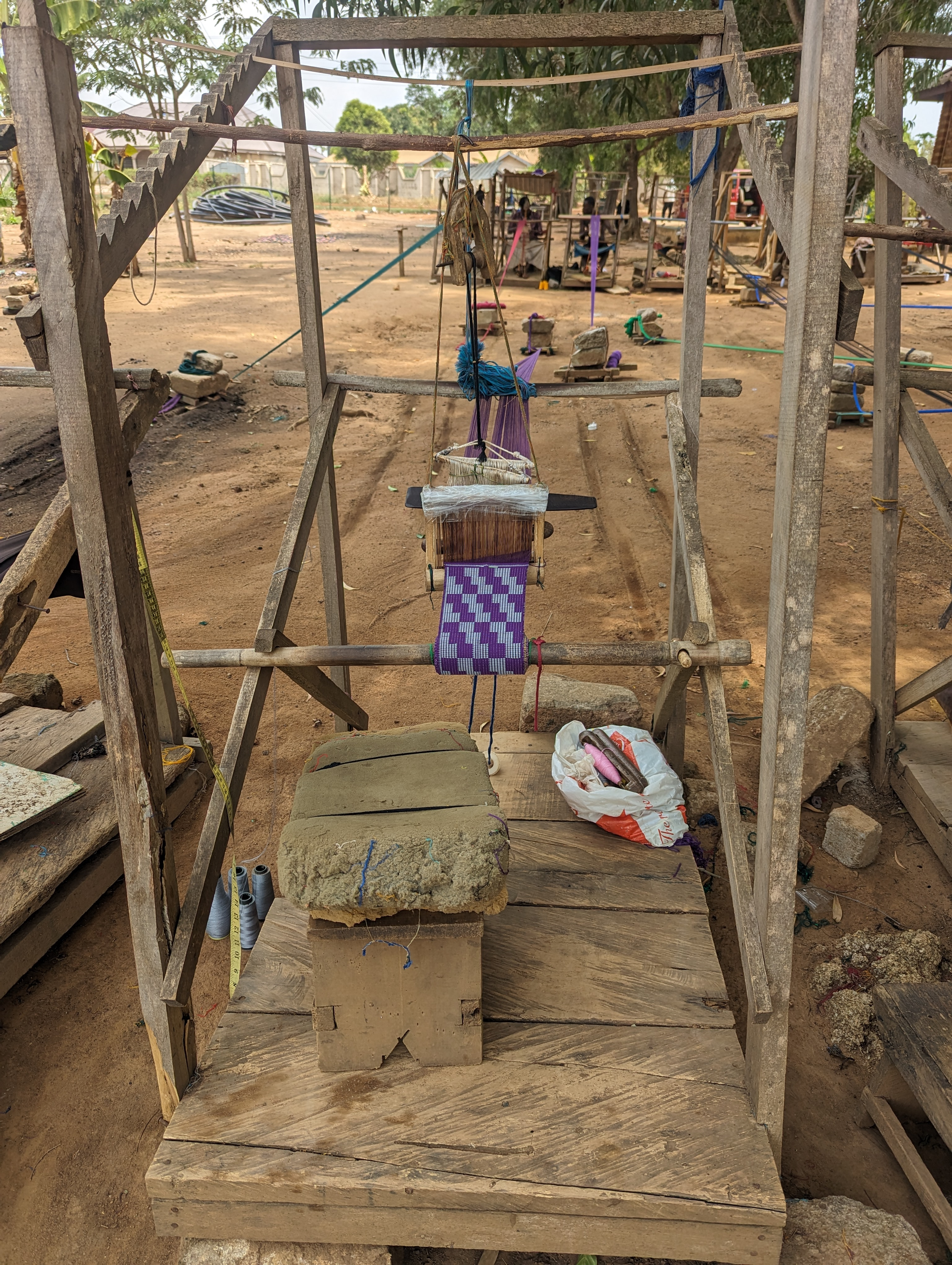
Modern loom for weaving kente.

Ahwepan refers to a simple design of warp stripes, created using plain weave and a single pair of heddles. The designs and motifs in kente cloth are traditionally abstract, but some weavers also include words, numbers and symbols in their work. Example messages include adweneasa, which translates as 'I've exhausted my skills', is a highly decorated type of kente with weft-based patterns woven into every available block of plain weave. Because of the intricate patterns, adweneasa cloth requires three heddles to weave.

== Symbolic meanings of the colors ==
- Black: maturation, intensified spiritual energy, spirits of ancestors, passing rites, mourning, and funerals
- Blue: peacefulness, harmony, and love
- Green: vegetation, planting, harvesting, growth, spiritual renewal
- Gold: royalty, wealth, high status, glory, spiritual purity
- Grey: healing and cleansing rituals; associated with ash
- Maroon: the color of mother earth; associated with healing
- Pink: associated with the female essence of life; a mild, gentle aspect of red
- Purple: associated with feminine aspects of life; usually worn by women
- Red: political and spiritual moods; bloodshed; sacrificial rites and death.
- Silver: serenity, purity, joy; associated with the moon
- White: purification, sanctification rites and festive occasions
- Yellow: preciousness, royalty, wealth, fertility, beauty
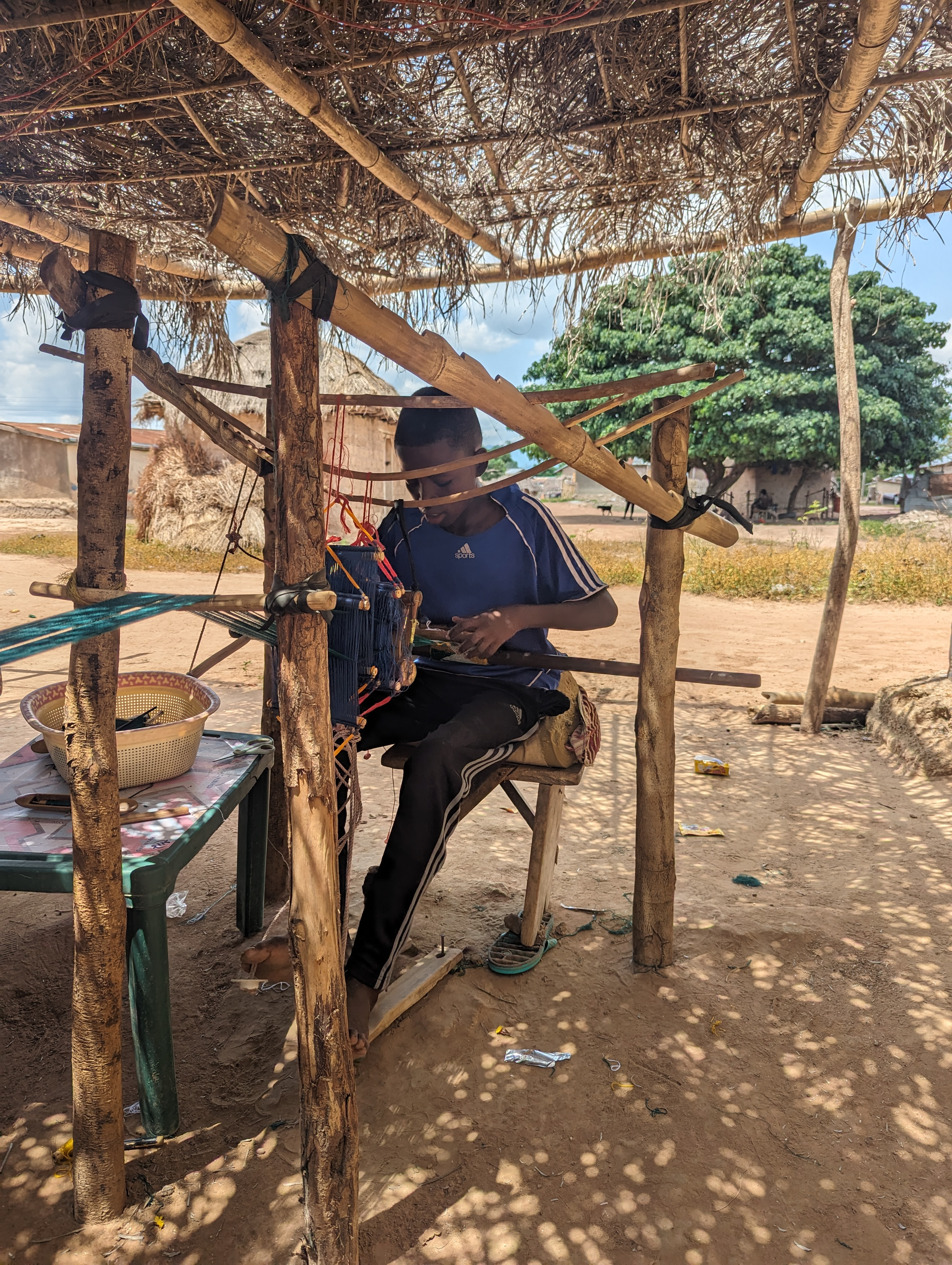
  A young weaver using a traditional loom.

== Stoles ==
Today, there is a still a wide use of Kente cloth in events such as ceremonies and commencements. Many universities, such as Florida A&M University, wear an Academic stole. This historically black institution incorporates historically accurate African art through the use of Kente cloth stoles. Traditionally, wearing a Kente cloth stole was a "college ritual of marking oneself with a visible sign of Africa" and "literally weaves ... wisdom of Africa" and incorporates the history and culture of African art. When students wear a Kente stole as a sign of success during their commencement ceremony, it will "transform their bodies into living, breathing proverbs."

== Controversy ==
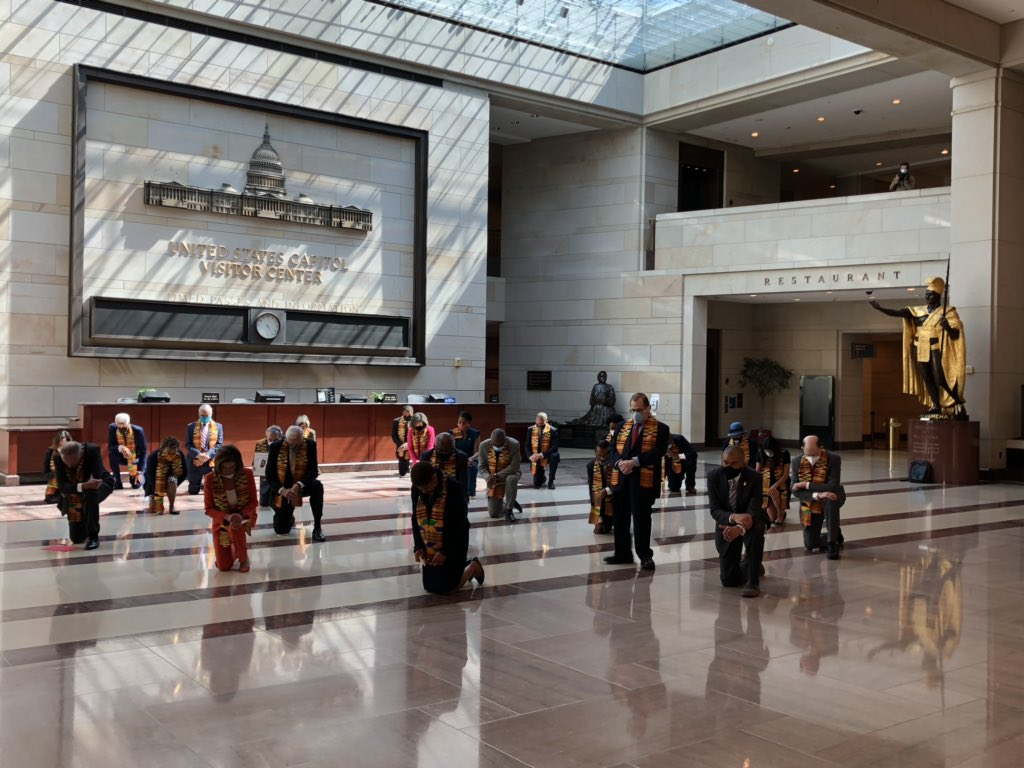
Congressional Democrats wearing kente cloth, June 2020.

In June 2020, Democratic Party leaders kneeled in the United States Capitol Visitor Center for 8 minutes and 42 seconds in protest, causing controversy by wearing stoles made of kente cloth to show support against systemic racism. While it was said to be an act of unity with African-Americans, many, including Jade Bentil, a Ghanaian-Nigerian researcher, voiced objection tweeting "My ancestors did not invent Kente cloth for them to be worn by publicity (obsessed) politicians as 'activism' in 2020". On the other hand Congressional Black Caucus chair Karen Bass said, at a news conference for the introduction of the Justice in Policing Act of 2020, that the non-black lawmakers were showing solidarity, and April Reign, who is credited with initiating the #OscarsSoWhite hashtag, while not a fan of the symbolism, suggested that the legislation's fate is more relevant than the event in the Capitol's Emancipation Hall.

There was also a controversy with Louis Vuitton's usage of a printed and monogrammed version of Kente in their autumn-winter 2021 collection by American creative director Virgil Abloh, whose grandmother was Ghanaian.

Additionally, there are questions of ownership of the woven craft, its image, and location of ateliers of production of kente. To this question of cultural appropriation, Abloh's response to the press in 2020 was: "Provenance is reality; ownership is a myth. In the same way, we cannot control our inspirations, we cannot trade-mark natural or cultural heritage as contemporary artistic territory." This coincided with the first appearance of this design of Kente cloth printed on a dress worn by American poet Amanda Gorman for the cover of Vogue's May 2021 issue.

== Geographical Indication status ==
In September 2025, Ghana gained GI status for the Kente. Under the GI status, only Kente cloths woven using traditional techniques and in approved Ghanaian communities are allowed to use the name, as the law protects Kente as Ghana's intellectual property. Bonwire, Agotime Kpetoe, and Sakora Wonoo are the towns where Kente is traditionally woven and approved by the Ghana Ministry of Tourism. Only kente crafted in the selected communities may lawfully be sold as kente thanks to the new GI law. Previously, the Ghana Copyright Act of 2005 (Act 690) protected Kente styles and designs from being duplicated. However, it was limited in protecting kente from third-party manufacturers.
