= Mr & Miss Akuapem =

Ghanaian beauty pageant

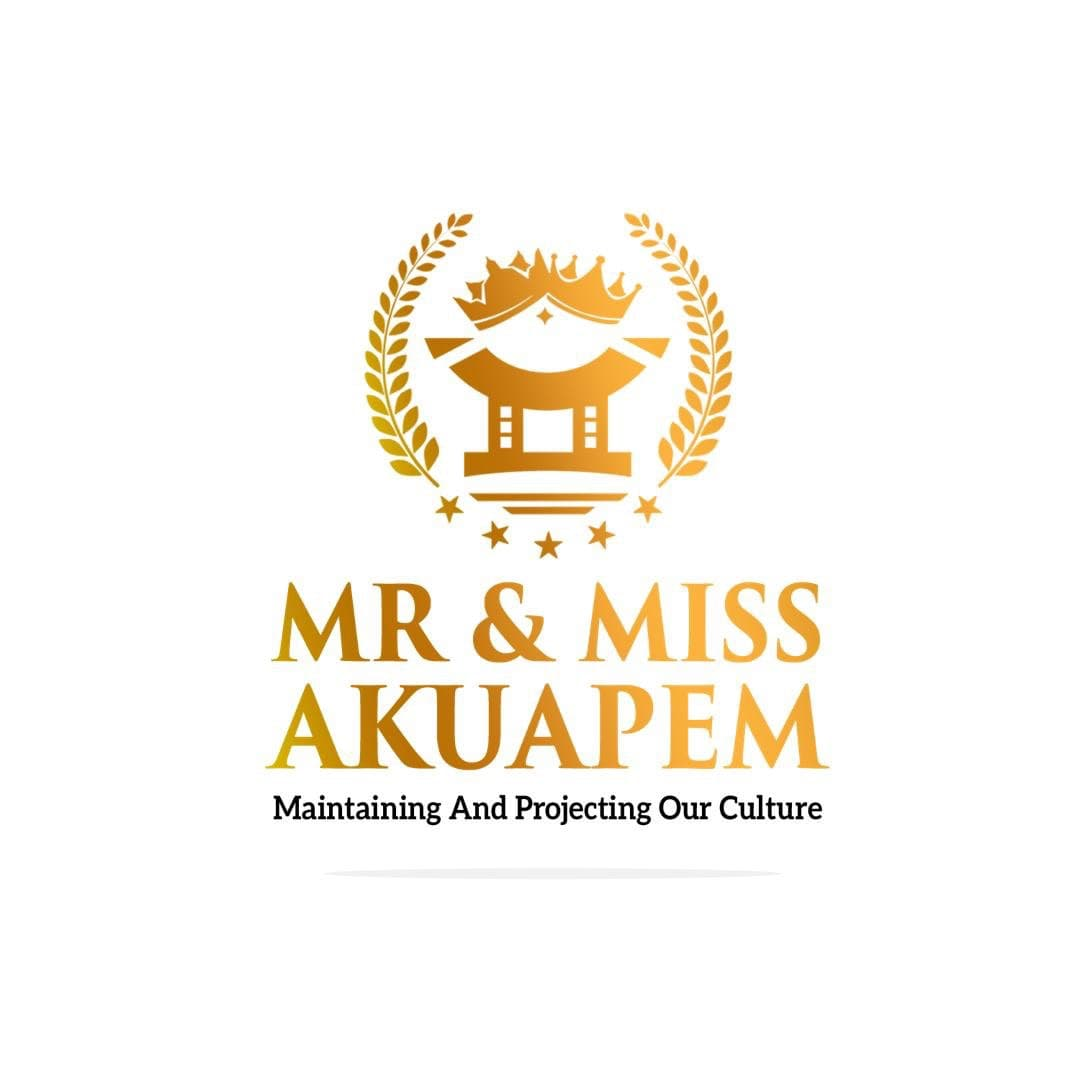
- Formation: 2021
- Type: Beauty pageant
- Headquarters: Akropong
- Location: Ghana
- Official language: Twi, English
- President: Prince Asiedu Chilky
- Key people: Oseadeeyo Kwasi Akuffo III

Mr. & Miss Akuapem is an annual unisex pageant focused on the culture of the Akuapem people of the Eastern region of Ghana. The aim of the pageant is to promote development through culture and unity.

== Overview ==
The pageant seeks to bring unity among all 17 states of Akuapem. Two contestants are chosen from each state. The 17 states are;

- Brekuso
- Aburi
- Ahwerase
- Obosomase
- Tutu
- Mampong
- Abotakyi
- Amanokrom
- Mamfe
- Larteh
- Akropong
- Abiriw
- Dawu
- Awukugua
- Adukrom
- Apirede
- Aseseeso/Abonse

=== Launch and Durbar to unveil contestants ===
The pageant was officially launched at the Palm Hill Hotel, Akropong Akuapem in June 2021 and unveiled the contestants in Adukrom with the permission from the Office of the Okuapehene led by Oseadeeyo Kwasi Akuffo III.

== Gallery ==
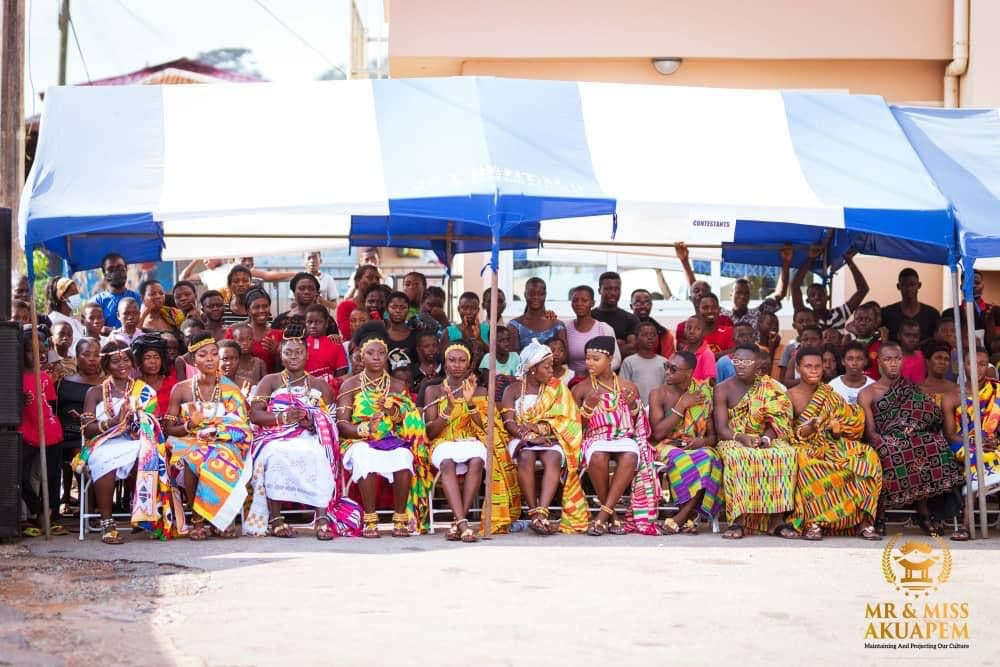
Contestants

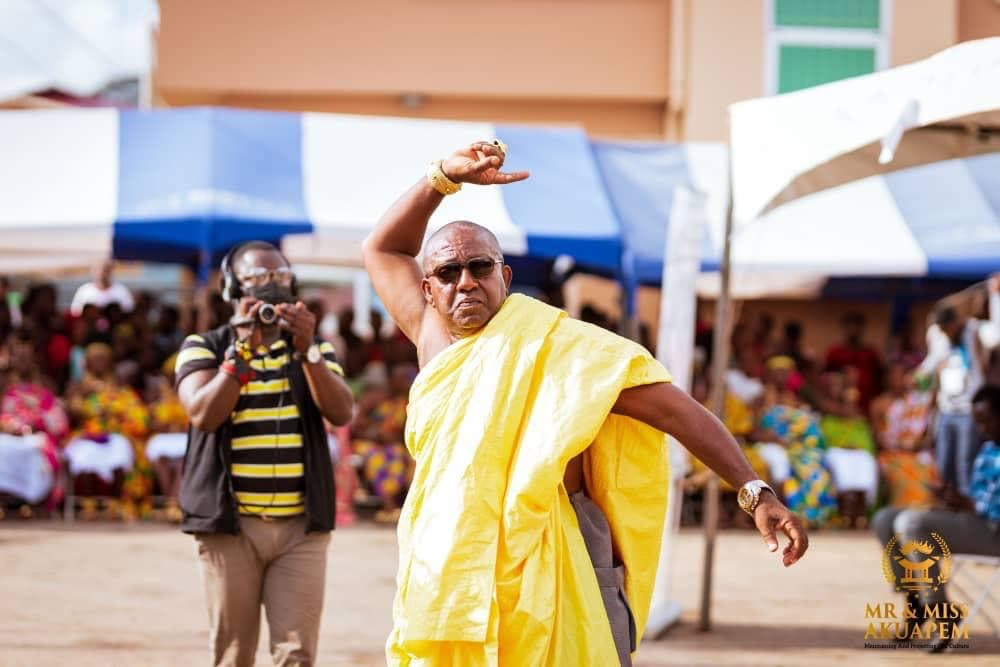
A man dancing to traditional music

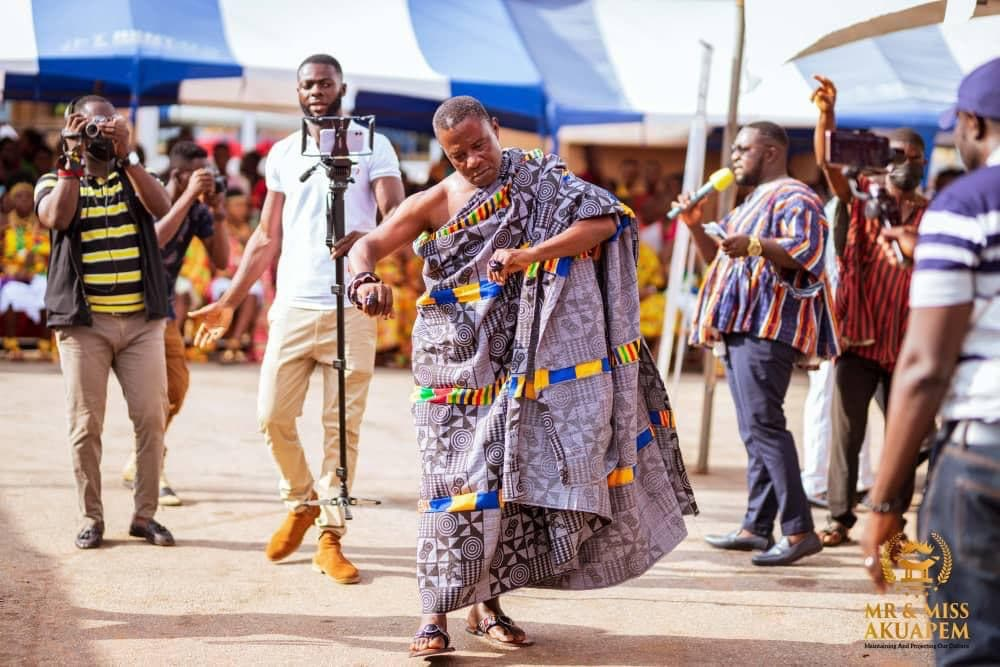
Official Launch in Adukrom

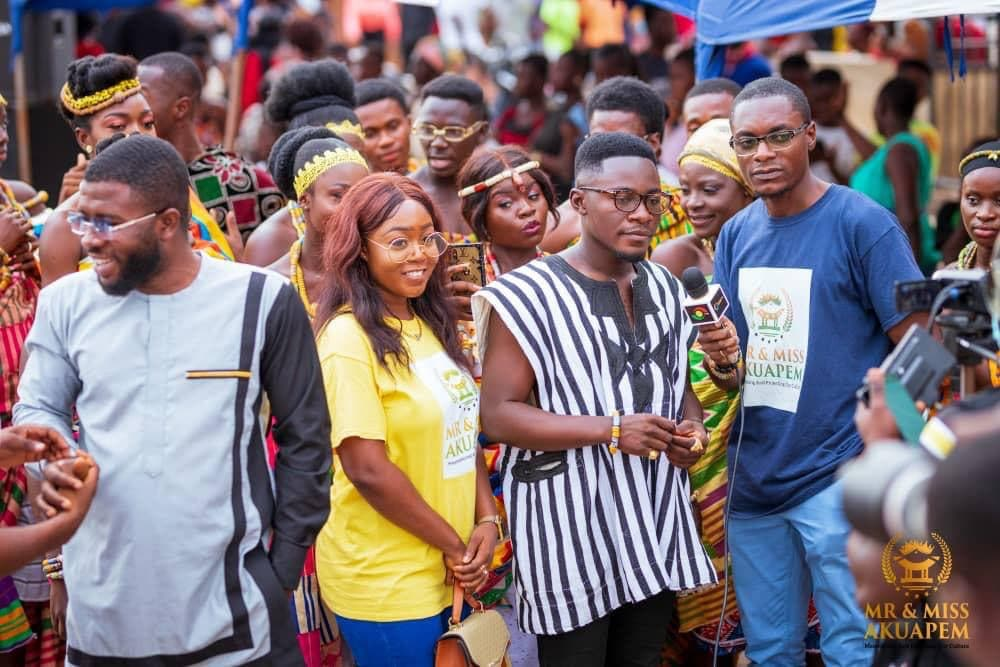
Launch in Adukrom

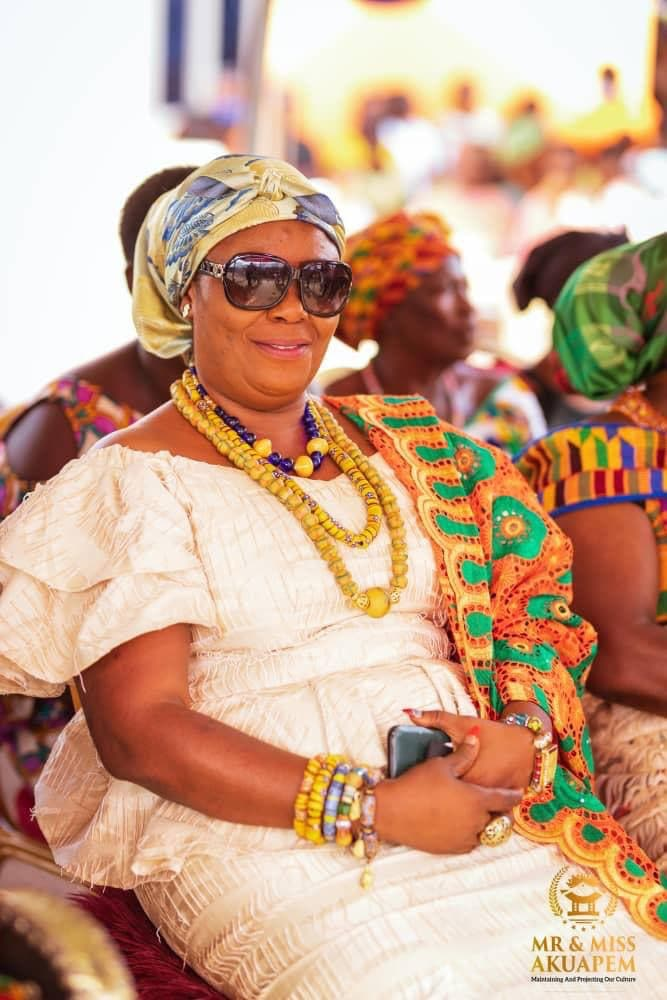

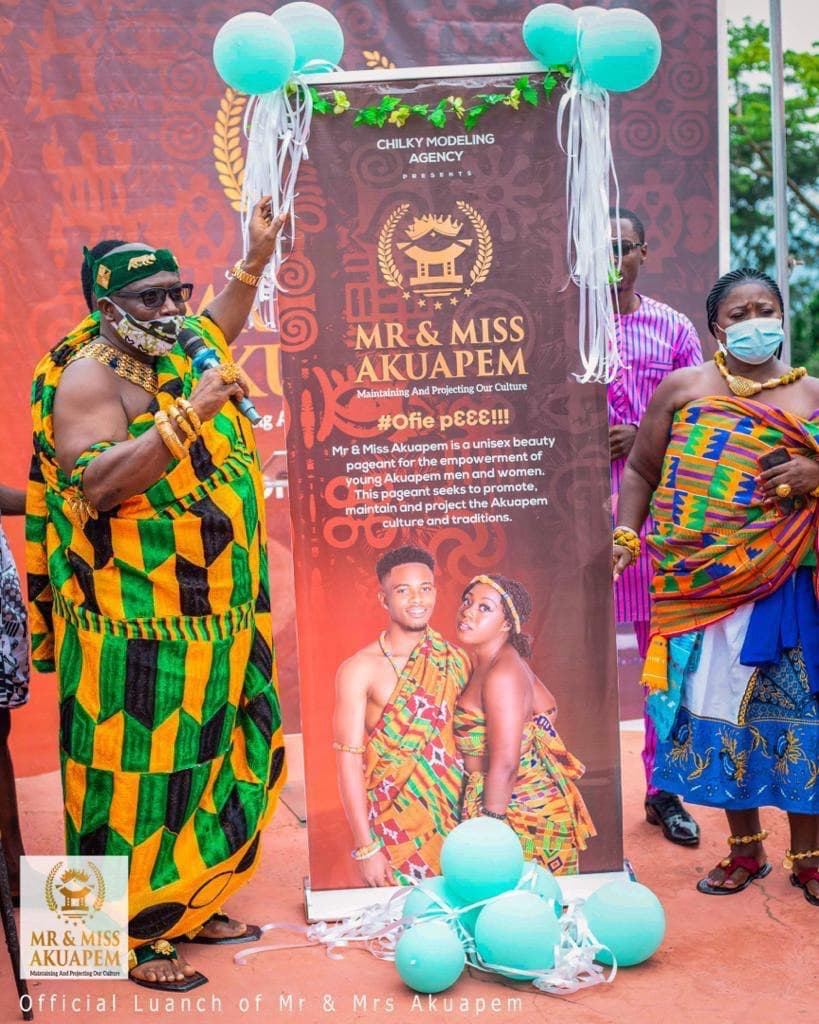
Paramount chief unveiling the pageant

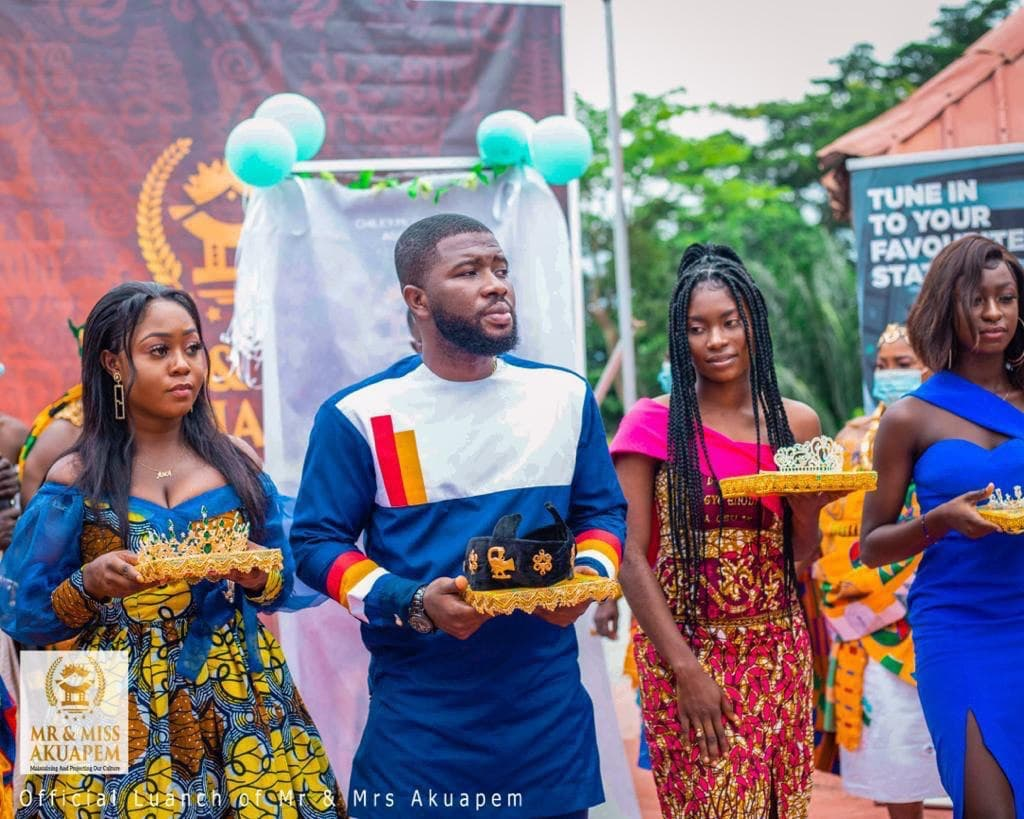
Crown being displayed

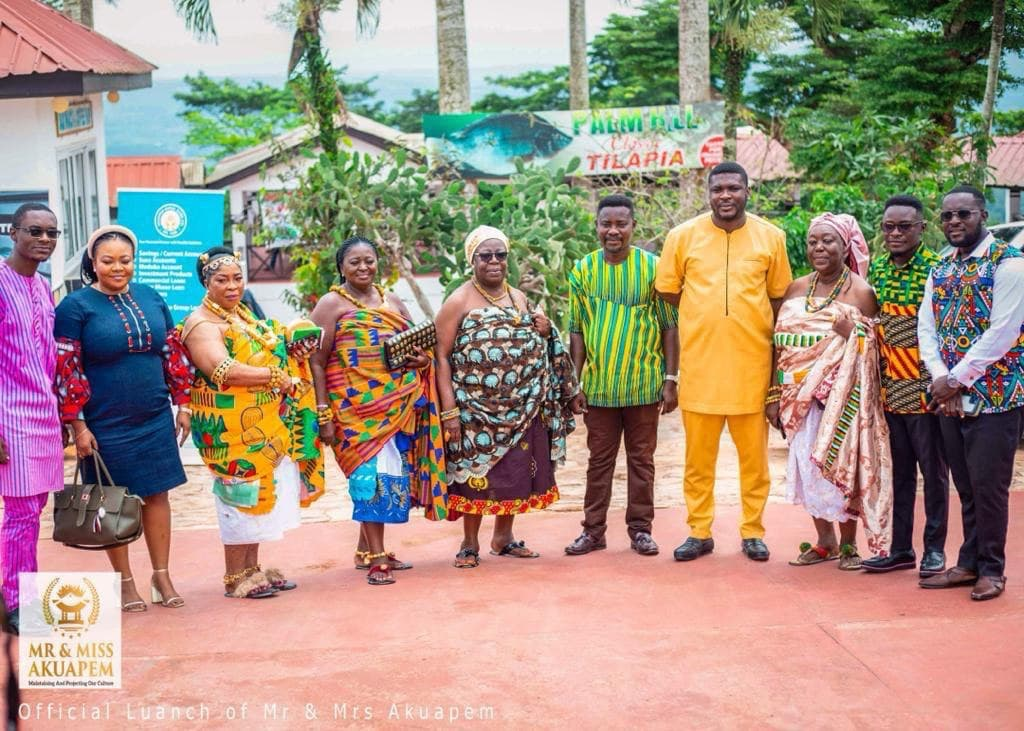
Paramount chiefs and Queen mothers

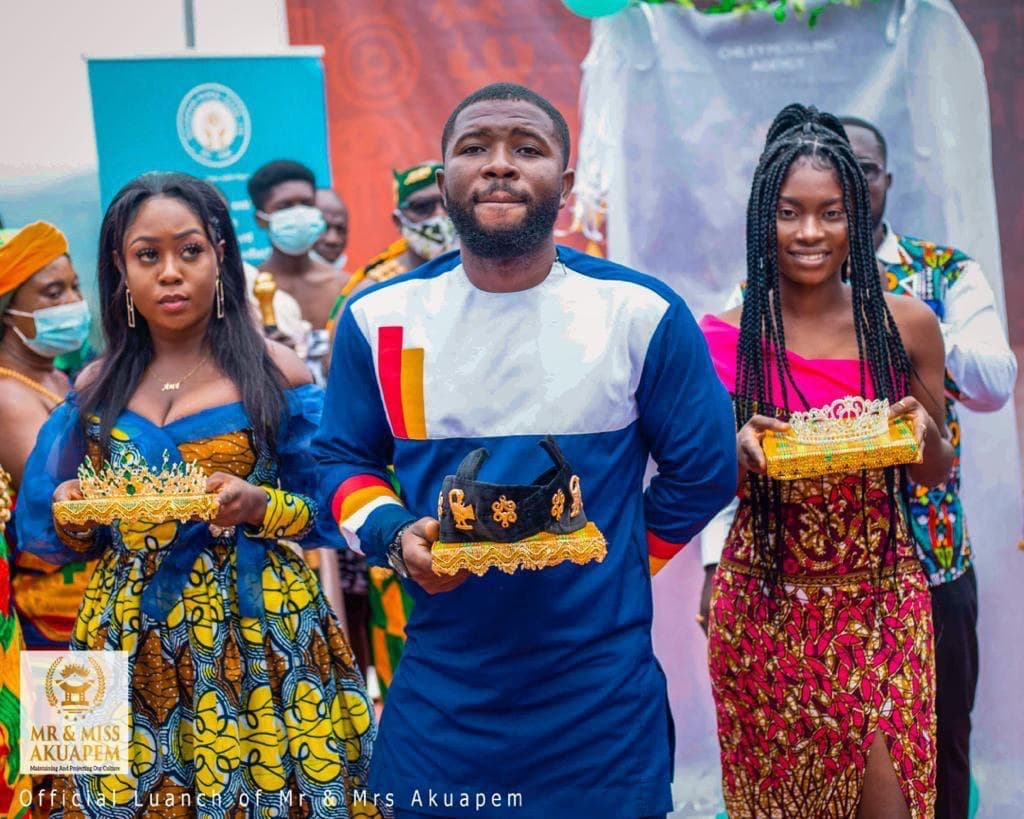
Crown being displayed

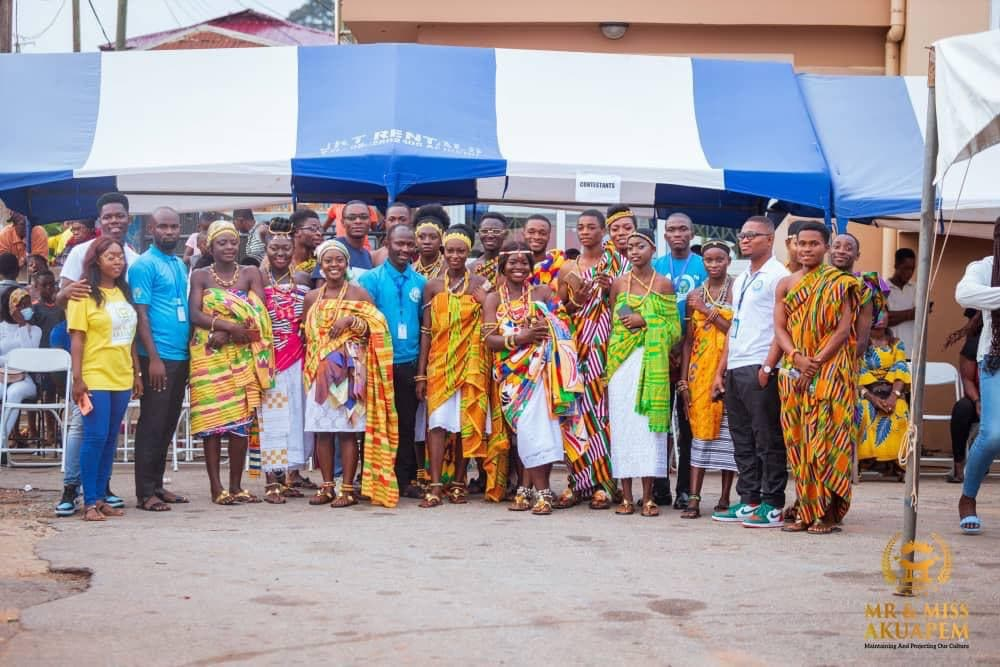
Mr and Miss Akuapem contestants
