= Akropong (Ghana parliament constituency) =

Ghana parliament constituency

- constituency for the Parliament of Ghana
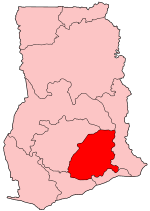
- District: Akuapim North District
- Region: Eastern Region of Ghana

Current constituency
- Party: New Patriotic Party
- MP: Samuel Awuku

NB: Refer to Akuapim north (Ghana Parliament Constituency) Samuel Awuku is the member of parliament for the constituency on the ticket of the NPP and was preceded by Nana Ama Dokua Asiamah Adjei who was also elected on the ticket of the New Patriotic Party (NPP) in 2016. She was preceded by Lawyer William Ofori Boafo. Prominent towns in the constituency include Akropong, Mamfe, Adawso, Kwamoso, Tinkon, and Okorase.

== List of MPs ==
Year	Member of Parliament	Political Party	Votes	President
1996	Agyare Koi Larbi	New Patriotic Party	14,590	Jerry Rawlings
2000	Agyare Koi Larbi	New Patriotic Party	8,659	John Kufuor
2004	William Ofori Boafo	New Patriotic Party	21,655	John Kufuor
2008	William Ofori Boafo	New Patriotic Party	20,245	John Atta Mills
2012	William Ofori Boafo	New Patriotic Party	26,828	John Mahama
2016	Nana Ama Dokua Asiamah-Adjei	New Patriotic Party	26,655	Nana Akufo-Addo
2020	William Ofori Boafo	New Patriotic Party	26,646	Nana Akufo-Addo
2024	Samuel Awuku	New Patriotic Party	28,365	John Dramani Mahama

== See also ==
- List of Ghana Parliament constituencies
