= List of rulers of the Akan state of Akuapem =

== List of Rulers of the Akan state of Akuapem ==
Tenure	Incumbent	Notes
ante 1730	Foundation of Akuapem state
Akuapemhene (Rulers)
Asona dynasty
???? to ????	Safori, Akuapemhene (Nana Ofori Dua)
???? to ????	Nana Okyerema Manukure, Akuapemhene
???? to ????	Nana Ofei Boa, Akuapemhene
???? to ????	Nana Ofei Amanapa, Akuapemhene
???? to ????	Nana Ofei Ntoakyerewa, Akuapemhene
???? to 1730	Nana Amaniafim, Akuapemhene
1730 to 1731	Nana Ofori Kuma I, Akuapemhene (Sakyiama Tenten) (Kwao Safori)
1731 to 1742	Nana Fianko Betuafo, Akuapemhene
1742 to 1765	Nana Kwapon Kyerefo, Akuapemhene
1765 to 1792	Nana Obuobi Atiemo, Akuapemhene
1792 to 1802	Nana Awuku Fenenee, Akuapemhene
September 1802 to December 1802	Nana Ohene Kuma, Akuapemhene
December 1802 to 1816	Nana Kwao Saforo Twie, Akuapemhene
1816 to 1836	Nana Addo Dankwa I, Akuapemhene
1837 to 1 November 1845	Nana Adum Tokori, Akuapemhene
1846 to 1866	Nana Kwadade I, Akuapemhene
1866 to 1876	Nana Asa Krefa, Akuapemhene
1876 to 1879	Nana Kwame Tawia, Akuapemhene
1880 to 1895	Nana Kwame Fori I, Akuapemhene
1895 to 1907	Nana Kwasi Akuffo, Akuapemhene	1st Term
1907 to 8 May 1914	Nana Charles Owusu Ansa, Akuapemhene
23 May 1914 to May 1919	Nana Ofori Kuma II, Akuapemhene	1st Term
May 1919 to 1920	Interregnum
1920 to 1927	Nana Kwasi Akuffo, Akuapemhene	2nd Term
1927 to 1930	Addo Dankwa II, Akuapemhene
1930 to 1932	Interregnum
1932 to 1941	Nana Ofori Kuma II, Akuapemhene	2nd Term
1941 to 1944	Interregnum
1944 to 1945	Nana Kwadade II, Akuapemhene
1945 to 1949	Nana Kwame Fori II, Akuapemhene	1st Term
1949 to 1959	Nana Twumhene, Akuapemhene
1959 to post/c. 1972	Nana Kwame Fori II, Akuapemhene	2nd Term
1974 to 2015	Nana Addo Dankwa III, Akuapemhene
2015 to 2020	Interregnum
2020 to present	Oseadeeyo Kwasi Akuffo III, Akuapemhene
1994	Akuapem Okere, Akuapem Anafo, Akuapem Guan states created through secession

== See also ==
- Akan people
- Ghana
- Gold Coast
- Lists of incumbents
- Akropong–Akuapem
