= Agyare Koi Larbi =

Ghanaian politician

Member of the Ghana Parliament for Akropong
- In office January 1997 – January 2005
- Succeeded by: William Ofori Boafo

Personal details
- Born: 26 December 1949
- Died: 10 November 2008 (aged 58) Korle Bu Hospital. Accra, Ghana
- Party: New Patriotic Party
- Profession: Politician

Agyare Koi Larbi (26 December 1949 – 10 November 2008) was a Ghanaian politician and a member of the 2nd and 3rd parliament of the 4th republic of Ghana. He was a former member of Parliament for the then-Akropong constituency now known as the Akuapem North Constituency of the eastern region of Ghana. Larbi was also a former member of the parliamentary committee on education. He died in Accra on 10 November 2008.

== Political career ==
Larbi was one of the founders of the New Patriotic Party. He served two terms in Parliament as a representative of the then-Akropong Constituency which is now the Akuapem North constituency on the ticket of the New Patriotic Party from 1997 to 2004. His term in Parliament began when he contested in the 1996 general elections and won with a total of 14,590 of the total votes cast that year.

He contested again in the 2000 Ghanaian general elections and maintained his seat as a member of parliament for Akropong constituency of the third parliament of the fourth republic of Ghana with a total number of 8,659 votes representing 31.1% of the total votes cast over his opponents Anthony Gyampo of the National Democratic Congress who also polled 8,625 votes representing 31.0%, Albert Gyang Boohene who polled 5,113 votes representing 18.4% of the total votes cast, Nana Esi Howe Botsio polling 4,394 total votes cast which represent 15.8%, Sakyi Boafo Akuffo Convention People's Party who polled 914 votes representing 03.3% of the total votes cast and Kofi Koranteng People's National Convention also polling 136 votes representing 00.5% of the total votes cast. He did not contest in other elections after his term in office ended.

== Personal life ==
Larbi was a Christian and was married with three children.

== Death ==
He died at the Korle-Bu Teaching Hospital in 2008 after a sudden illness.
