= Ed Reynolds (scholar) =

First black full-time graduate of Wake Forest University

Edward Reynolds
- Born: January 23, 1942 (age 83); Ghana
- Education: Wake Forest University (BA); Ohio State University (MA); Yale University (MA); University of London (PhD)
- Occupation(s): Scholar, Professor

Edward Reynolds (born January 23, 1942) was the first black full-time graduate of Wake Forest University, a move that began the desegregation movement for private schools in the American South. He became a professor of history at the University of California, San Diego, and the author of several history books.

== Early life ==
Reynolds was born in Akropong, Ghana, in 1942. After being introduced into the African Student Program, activists decided to contact missionaries in order to recruit and finance a black African student as an international student. Harris Mobley, a Baptist minister in Ghana, recommended Reynolds, who had a desire to effect social change. In 1961, Reynolds applied for admission to Wake Forest University, but his initial application was rejected, so the program instead sent him to North Carolina to attend the historically black Shaw University in Raleigh.

In 1962, Reynolds transferred to Wake Forest University, staying with the Drayton family. His application was accepted by Wake Forest's board of trustees on April 27, 1962. He graduated from the school in 1964, after earning a bachelor's degree in history. In 2013, Reynolds stated that he did not come to Wake Forest because he felt it was his best chance at receiving a good education, but because he wanted to uphold the sense of mission given to him by relatives and friends in Ghana, and because he admired the stand for integration that Wake Forest was making.

Reynolds went on to earn a master's degree from Ohio University and Yale Divinity School, followed by a doctorate in African history from the University of London in 1972.

== Post-graduate life ==
He became a professor of history at the University of California, San Diego, and the author of several history books, including Stand the Storm: A History of the Atlantic Slave Trade (1985).

Reynolds returned to Wake Forest as a guest in 2012, fifty years after his graduation, to give a speech.

== Personal life ==
As of 2013, Reynolds has been married at least twice.
