= Ahwerase =

- Town
- Location within Ghana
- Coordinates: 05°50′43″N 00°10′33″W
- Country: Ghana
- Region: Eastern Region
- District: Akuapim South Municipal
- Time zone: GMT
  - Summer (DST): GMT

Ahwerase is a town in the Akuapem South Municipal District of the Eastern Region of South Ghana. It shares borders with Aburi which is famous for the Aburi Botanical Gardens and the Odwira Festival.

== Festival ==
The people of Ahwerase celebrate the Odwira Festival and this ceremony is usually held in September/October. Odwira is one of Ghana's many festivals that see attendance from people from all walks of life including the diaspora.

For many decades, the Odwira festival has been a staple of Ghana's colourful, vibrant and diverse cultural expression, bringing together people from all walks of life to celebrate themes of victory, gratitude and harvest, in unity. However, even before Odwira became a part of Ghana's cultural landscape it had long been celebrated by the people of Akropong, Amanokrom and Aburi in the Eastern Region.
