= Nana Ama Dokua Asiamah-Adjei =

Ghanaian politician

Oheneba Nana Ama Dokua Asiamah-Adjei
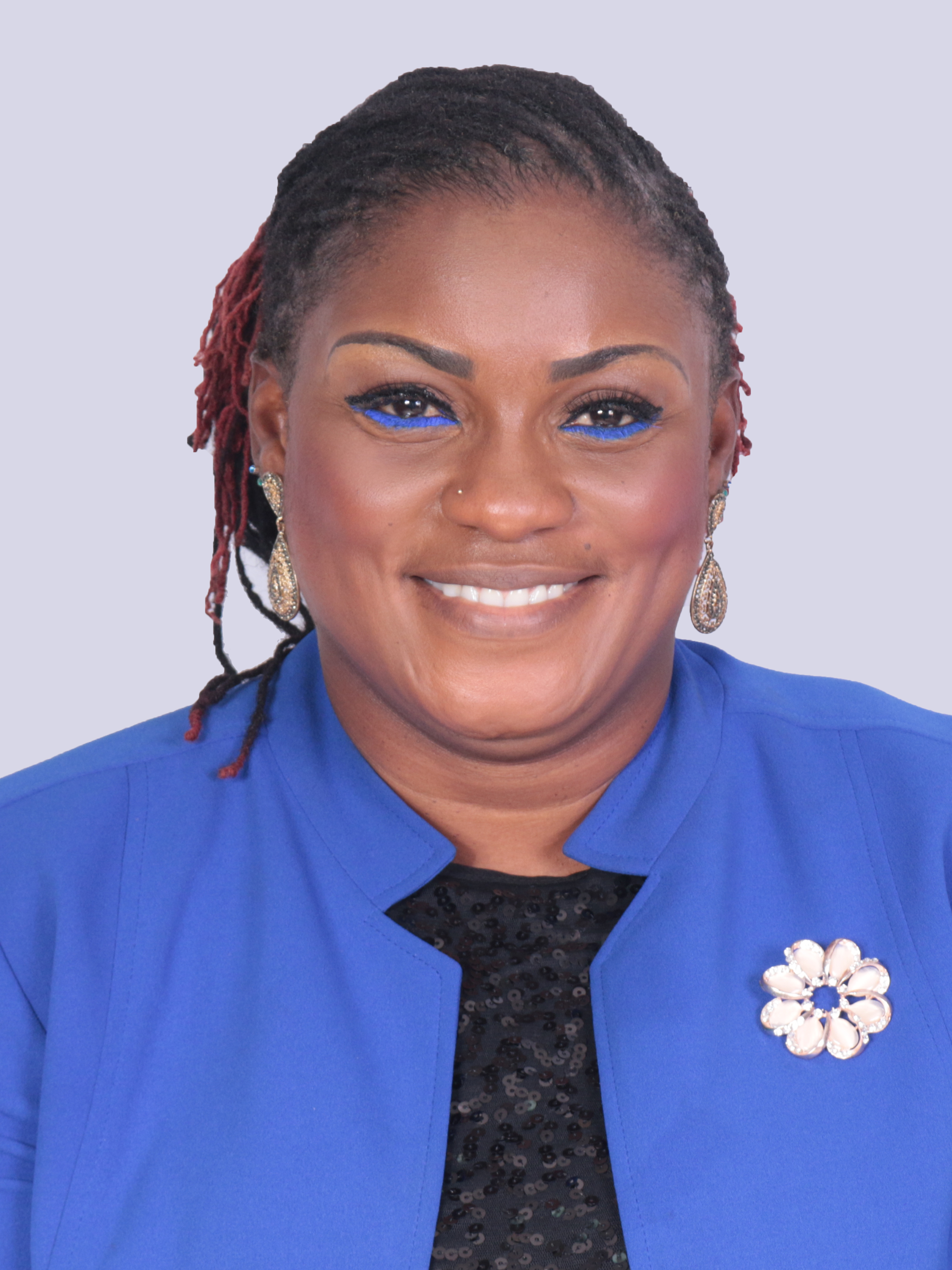

Member of the Ghana Parliament for Akuapem North/ Akropong
- Incumbent
- Assumed office 2017
- Preceded by: William Ofori Boafo

Deputy Minister of Trade and Industry
- Incumbent
- Assumed office March 2021
- President: Nana Akufo-Addo

Former Deputy Minister of Information
- In office 2017–2021

Personal details
- Born: 24 July 1982 (age 44) Akropong, Eastern Region, Ghana
- Party: New Patriotic Party
- Children: 4
- Education: University of Ghana; St Roses Senior High; University of Exeter
- Committees: Defence and Interior Committee

Oheneba Nana Ama Dokua Asiamah-Adjei (born 24 July 1982) is a Ghanaian politician and was the member of parliament for Akropong Constituency in the Eastern Region. She is a member of the New Patriotic Party and a former deputy minister of Trade & Industry of Ghana having served as a Deputy Minister of Information under the same government.

== Early life and education ==
Adjei was born on 24 July 1982 to Nana Osae Nyampong IV and Mrs. Aforo Asiamah-Adjei in Akropong, Eastern Region. She had her basic and senior school education at Alsyd Academy and St Roses Senior High school respectively. She holds a bachelor's degree in psychology from the University of Ghana and a master's degree in Logistics and Supply Chain from the Exter University in United Kingdom She further had her master's degree in Peace and Security at the Kofi Annan International Peacekeeping Training Centre (KAIPTC).

== Career ==
Adjei was the managing director for Bekleen Limited from 2007 to 2016 and also Pongas Limited from 2007 to 2015.

== Politics ==
Adjei is a member of the New Patriotic Party. She was the Member of Parliament for the Akropong Constituency in the Eastern Region of Ghana from 2017 to 2025.

=== 2016 election ===
In the 2016 Ghanaian general election, she won the Akropong/Akuapem North Constituency parliamentary seat with 26,655 votes making 62.3% of the total votes cast whilst the NDC parliamentary candidate Yaw Appiah-Kubi had 6,949 votes making 16.8% of the total votes cast, an Independent parliamentary candidate Asiedu Ofei had 9,092 votes making 21.2% of the total votes cast and the CPP parliamentary candidate Gifty Mercy Anakwa had 102 votes making 0.2% of the total votes cast.

=== 2020 election ===
In the 2020 Ghanaian general election, she again won the Akropong/Akuapem North Constituency parliamentary seat with 26,646 votes making 55.3% of the total votes cast whilst the NDC parliamentary candidate Justice Kotey Amasah had 10,505 votes making 21.8% of the total votes cast, an Independent parliamentary candidate Adjei Twumasi William Kwabena had 10,444 votes making 21.7% of the total votes cast, the PNC parliamentary candidate Desmond Twumasi Ntow had 421 votes making 0.9% of the total votes cast and the CPP parliamentary candidate Gifty Mercy Anakwa had 146 votes making 0.3% of the total votes cast.

=== 2024 Election ===
Prior to the up coming 2024 election, Nana Ama Dokua made a declaration in December 2023, her intention to cross constituency as she intended to aspire for the parliamentary seat of Okaikwei North Constituency in the Greater Accra Region. A petition was filed against her by Kingsley Anyamasah during the organized voter registration exhibition by the Electoral Commission of Ghana, which questioned the case of whether Nana Ama Dokua was eligible to vote in Okaikwei North. The case was ruled in her favour as court dismissed the petition challenging her eligibility to vote in Okaikwei North.

=== Committee ===
Adjei was a member of the Defence and Interior Committee.

== Personal life ==
Adjei has two sons and two daughters. She identifies as a Christian.

== Philanthropy ==
In November 2021, she presented computers and accessories to Mangoase Methodist School in the Akuapim North Constituency.

In May 2022, Adjei donated an amount of GHc30,000 for the construction of the chief palace at Adawso. In July 2022, she aided in the refurbishment of the Akropong Daakye Clinic.
