= Pageantry =

Pageantry is a colorful display, as in a pageant. It may refer to:

- Beauty pageant
- Drag pageantry
- Medieval pageant
- R.E.M.'s 1986 Tour
