= Pageant =

Pageant(s) or The Pageant(s) may refer to:

== Events ==
- Procession or ceremony in elaborate costume
- Beauty pageant, or beauty contest
- List of pageants of the Church of Jesus Christ of Latter-day Saints
- Medieval pageant, a narrative medieval procession, and modern revival forms
- Nativity play, also known as a "Christmas pageant"

== Music ==
- Pageants (band), an American indie rock duo
- Pageant (album), by Pwr Bttm, or the title song, 2017
- "Pageant", a song by Moi dix Mois, 2004
- Pageant , a 1991 off-Broadway musical by Robert Longbottom

== Other uses ==
- Pageant (film), a 2008 documentary about the Miss Gay America Contest
- Pageant (magazine), a 20th-century American monthly
- Pageant (novel), a 1933 historical novel by G. B. Lancaster
- pageant.exe, an SSH authentication agent for PuTTY software
- Pageant, a community in Vulcan County, Alberta, Canada
- Pageant Films, a New Zealand production company founded by Gabriel Reid
- The Pageant, a nightclub in St. Louis, Missouri, U.S.
- The Pageants, an 18th-century shipyard on the River Thames, London, England

== See also ==
- Pageantry (disambiguation)
