= Akuapemhene =

Name of a Ghanaian ruler of Akuapem

Akuapemhene is another name for a ruler of Akuapem. The word is only used in Akuapem.
