= Samuel Awuku =

Ghanaian politician and lawyer

Hon. Samuel Awuku

Member of Parliament for Akuapem North (Ghana parliament constituency)
- Incumbent
- Assumed office 7 January 2025
- Preceded by: Nana Ama Dokua Asiamah-Adjei

Personal details
- Born: 10 April 1984 (age 42) Koforidua, Ghana
- Party: New Patriotic Party
- Spouse: Mary Anane
- Children: 3
- Education: St. Augustine's College (Cape Coast); University of London; University of Ghana Free University of Berlin
- Occupation: Politician, Lawyer
- Nickname: Sammi

Samuel Awuku (born 10 April 1984) is a Ghanaian politician who was Deputy Communications Director, National Youth Organiser and the National Organiser of the New Patriotic Party (NPP). He is also the board chairman of the National Youth Employment Agency (YEA).

In 2021, he was appointed as the Director General of the National Lottery Authority. He is the current Member of parliament for the Akuapem North (Ghana parliament constituency).

== Birth ==
Awuku is the only son among four sisters and the last born of his parents. He was born and raised in Koforidua, in the Eastern Region of Ghana.

== Education ==
Awuku had his basic education at Nana Kwaku Boateng Experimental School. He continued his secondary education at St. Augustine's College in Cape Coast and later read Political science and Psychology at the University of Ghana, Legon.

Awuku holds a Diploma in Law from the University of London and is currently pursuing a master's degree in International relations at the Free University of Berlin in Germany.

He has also earned a Diploma of Higher Education in Law from the University of London and an Executive Education Certificate in Public Leadership from the Kennedy School of Government in Harvard University, USA.

He holds postgraduate certificates in Public Administration and Advertising, Marketing and Public Relations from the Ghana Institute of Management and Public Administration (GIMPA) and the Ghana Institute of Journalism, respectively.

== Personal life ==
Awuku is married to Mary Anane Awuku, with three daughters.

== Political career ==
While at the University of Ghana, Awuku was a political community member, once contesting for the presidency of the Student Representative Council. From 2011 to 2013, he worked at the Communications Directorate of the New Patriotic Party, assisting then Director of Communications, Nana Akomea, before his election as National Youth Organiser in April 2014.

During 2012 Election Petition hearing at the Supreme Court of Ghana, Awuku was charged with contempt of the highest court of the land. He was pardoned after pleading guilty and showing remorse.

As National Youth Organiser, Awuku played a vital role in mobilizing the youth leading to NPP's victory in the 2016 Ghanaian general election.

In 2016, Awuku was number five among the fifty most influential young Ghanaians.

== Other roles ==
He is a director at the Brain Hill International School and was a Director of Strategy and Innovation at the April–June Company Limited in Accra until 2021. He has been on the Board of the Accra City Hotel since 2017. He has been the vice chairman of the International Young Democrats Union (IYDU) for three terms. It is an international association of the youth wings of conservative parties worldwide.
