= H'Mount Sinai Senior High School =

Hark Mount Sinai Senior High School
- Akropong; Eastern Region; Ghana

Information
- Type: Public high school
- Established: 1978; 48 years ago
- Founder: Sacred Order of the Silent Brotherhood
- Status: Active
- School district: Akuapim North District
- Oversight: Ministry of Education
- Gender: Co-educational
- Age: 14 to 18
- Classes offered: General Arts, Home Economics, General Science, General Agriculture, Business, Visual Arts
- Language: English
- Houses: 6
- Colours: Pink and blue

H'Mount Sinai Senior High School is a category C co-educational first-cycle institution in Akropong in the Eastern Region of Ghana.

The school runs courses in Business, General Science, general arts, general agric, Home Economics and visual arts, leading to the award of a West African Senior School Certificate (WASSCE).

== History ==
A community-based institution that was established in 1978 by the Sacred Order of the Brotherhood Mission. The general objective of its establishments was to provide full secondary school education to the growing number of boys and girls, especially those residing around the Akropong community.

The school runs both day, boarding and hostel systems with the majority of the students in the boarding house.

The school's colors are pink and blue. The school has on this grounds trained a lot of diligent men and women in godliness, good character and responsibility.

The school has the twin towers of the Sacred Order of the Silent Brotherhood Mission with various floors serving as classrooms and offices. The structure was put up by the Silent Brotherhood Mission in 1978.

In 2019, the school knocked out St. Roses Senior High School from the National Science and Maths Quiz (NSMQ) regional contest to qualify for the national contest.

== Enrollment ==
The school has about 2,500 students enrolled in business, general science, general arts, general agric, Home Economics, and visual arts courses.

== Facilities ==
- 3 Science Laboratories ( Physics, Biology and Chemistry)
- I.C.T Lab
- Library
- Home Economics Lab
- Visual Arts Center
- School Farm
- Sports (standard field for soccer and athletics, basketball court, volley and handball court)
- School Clinic
- Barbering shop
- General Assembly Hall

== See also ==
- Education in Ghana
- List of senior high schools in Ghana
