= Pageants (band) =

American indie rock duo

- Origin: Long Beach, California
- Genres: Indie Rock Twee Pop
- Members: Devin O'Brien; Rebecca Coleman

Pageants is an indie rock duo formed in 2011 and based in Long Beach, California. Its members consist of Rebecca Coleman (formerly of Avi Buffalo) on vocals, guitar and keys, and Devin O'Brien on bass and guitar. "Coleman’s new band employs the shrill harmonies she lent to her former act’s breakthrough debut album last year," while lending itself towards "the lonely guitar jangle of early Liz Phair" rather "than Avi Buffalo's axe heroics."

== Discography ==
=== Albums ===
- 2018: “Forever”
- 2021: “Sun and settled days”

=== Singles ===
- 2013: "Musings Of The Tide" b/w "August Moon" (7" release)
