= Akuapem North (Ghana parliament constituency) =

Ghana parliament constituency

- constituency for the Parliament of Ghana
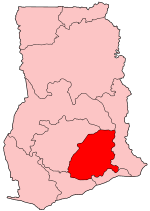
- District: Akuapim North Municipal District
- Region: Eastern Region of Ghana

Current constituency
- Created: 2016
- Party: New Patriotic Party (Ghana); New Patriotic Party (NPP)
- MP: Samuel Awuku

Akuapem North is one of the constituencies represented in the Parliament of Ghana. It elects one Member of Parliament (MP) by the first past the post system of election. Samuel Awuku is the member of parliament for the constituency. He was elected on the ticket of the New Patriotic Party (NPP) won a majority of 28,365 votes.

== Members of Parliament ==
Election	Member	Party
2016 Ghanaian general election	Nana Ama Dokua Asiamah Adjei	New Patriotic Party
2020 Ghanaian general election	Nana Ama Dokua Asiamah-Adjei	New Patriotic Party
2024 Ghanaian general election	Samuel Awuku	New Patriotic Party

== Boundaries ==
The seat is located entirely within the Akuapem North Municipal Assembly of the Eastern Region of Ghana.
