= Akuapem Anafo =

Akuapem Anafo (Akuapem South) is an Akan autonomous paramountcy in Ghana. It was established by decision of the Larteh Accord in 1994. The Larteh Accord, replacing the older Abotakyi Accord, separated the traditional territories of the Akuapem State into three autonomous paramountcies:

- Akuapem Anafo
- Akuapem Guan
- Akuapem Okere

== List of rulers of the Akuapem Anafo ==
Tenure	Incumbent	Notes
Akuapemhene (Rulers)
Asona Dynasty
26 March 1994 to present	Nana Gyan Kwasi III, Akuapemhene
