= Obosomase Waterfalls =

Waterfall in the Eastern Region of Ghana

Obosomase
- Obosomase Waterfalls
- Map showing a town in Ghana
- Coordinates: 5°52′30.4″N 0°09′25.4″W
- Regions of Ghana: Eastern Region, Ghana

Obosomase Waterfalls is located in the Eastern Region of Ghana. It is 150 meters from the Aburi community.

== Location ==
The Obosomase waterfalls can be found at the Akuapim North Municipal District of Eastern Region.

== Images ==
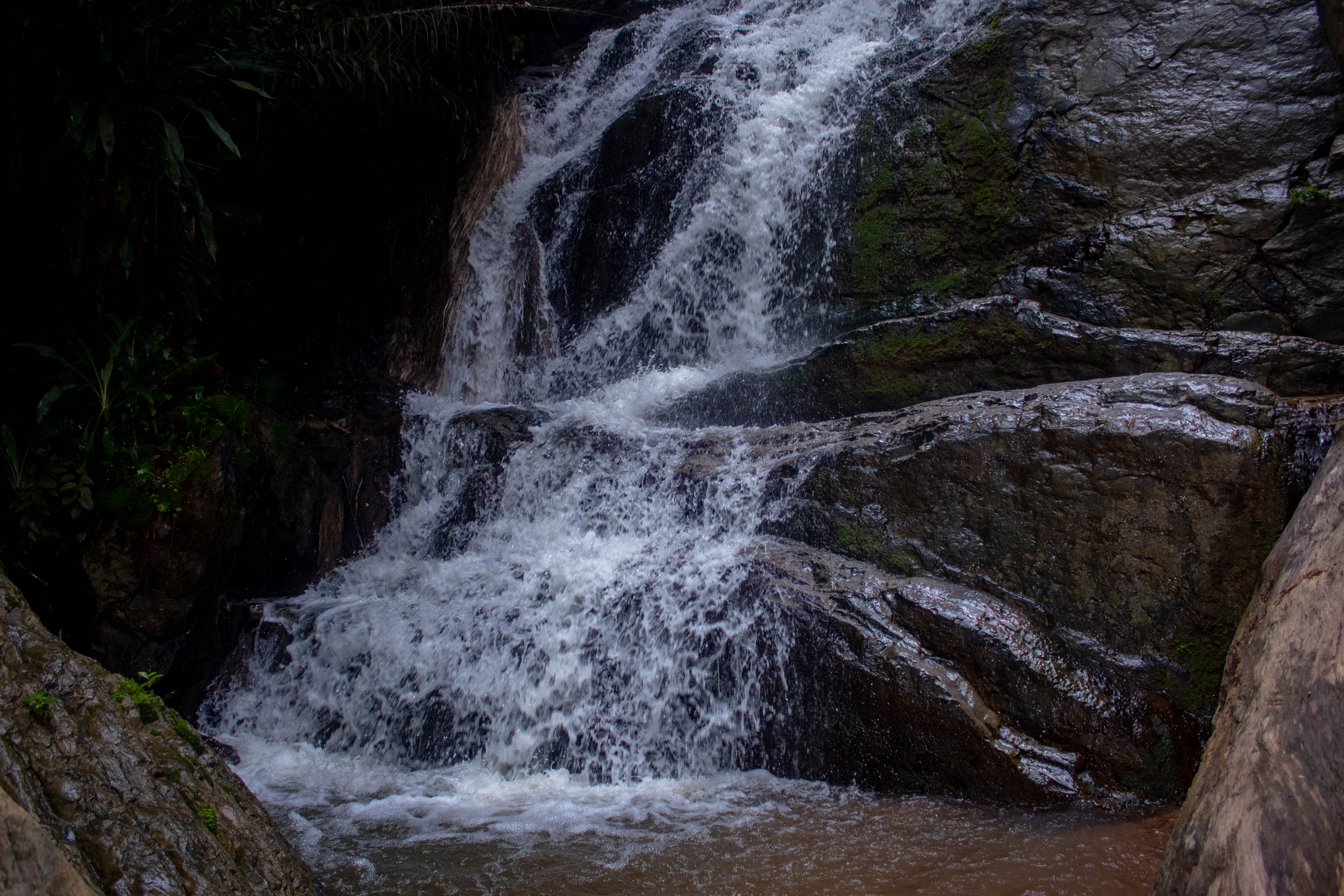
Obosomase Waterfalls

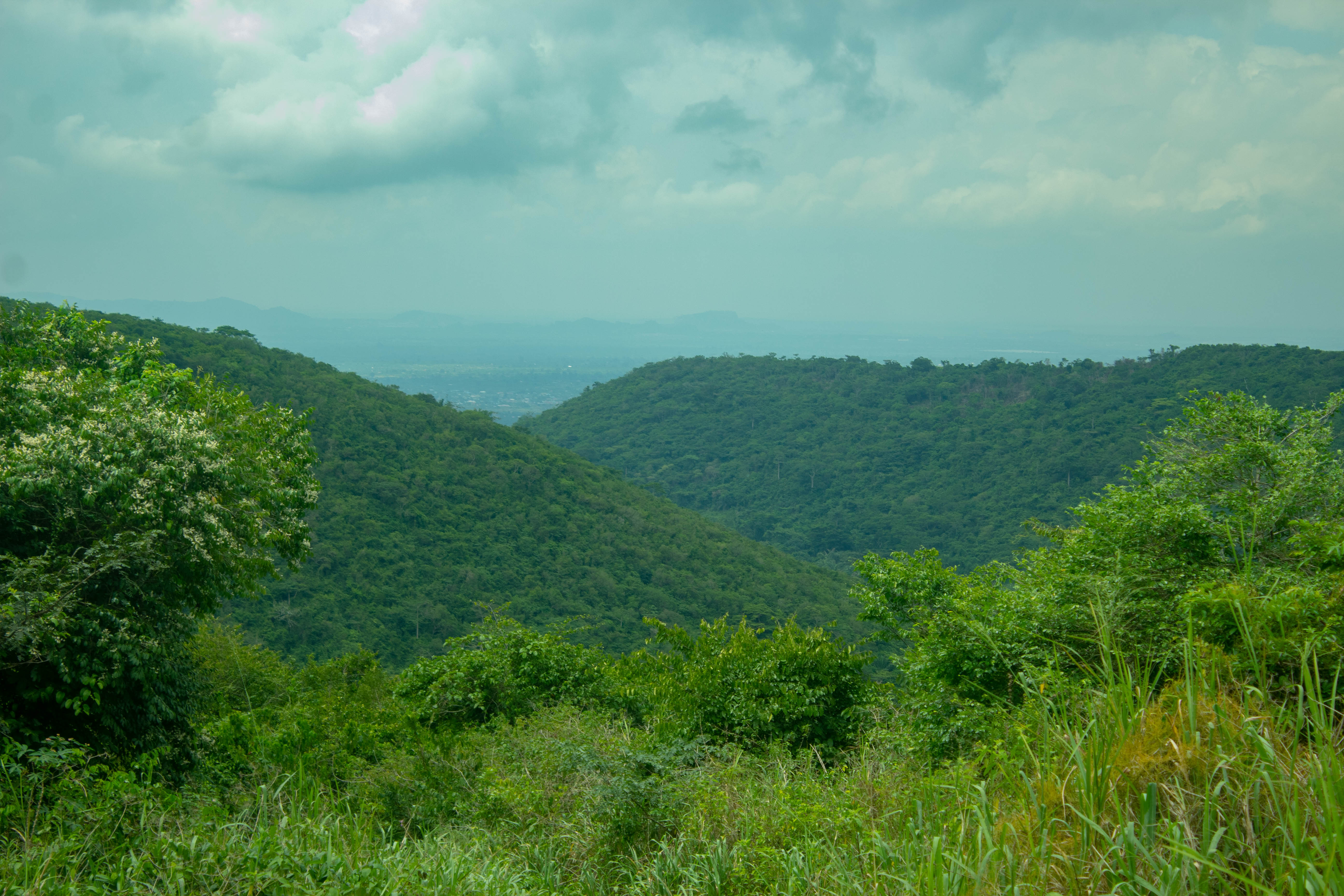
Obosomase Forest

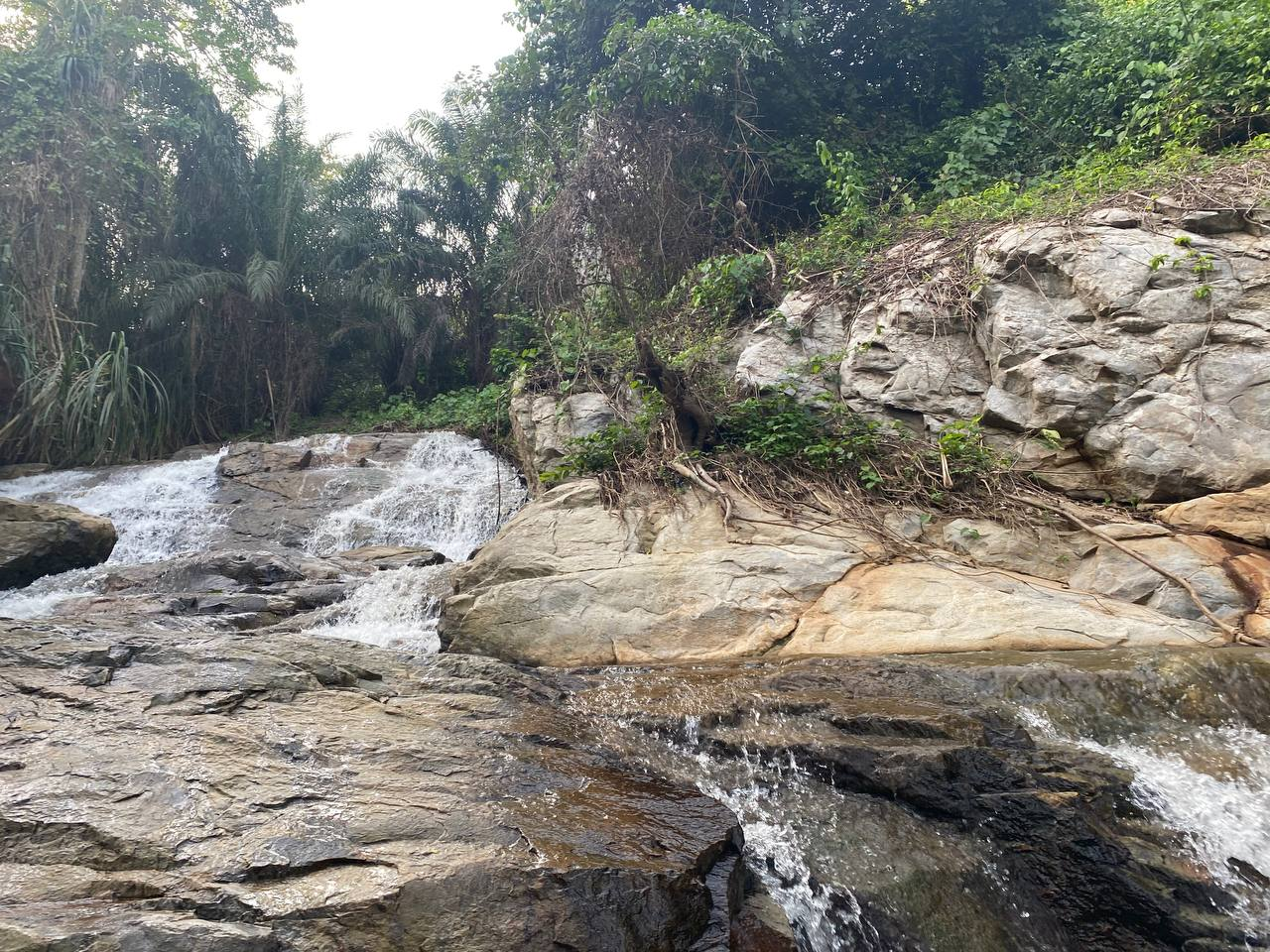
Waterfalls

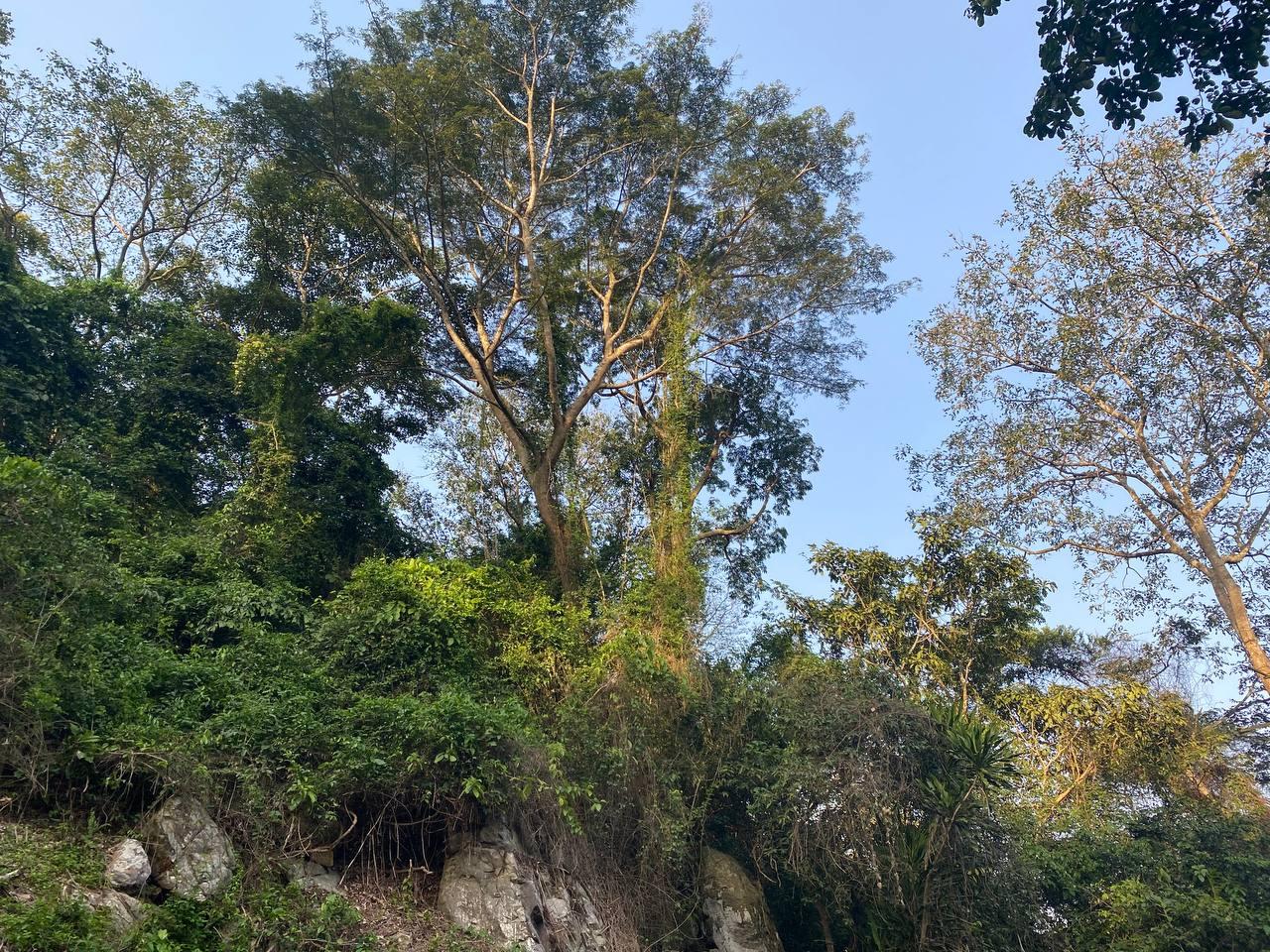
Trees around Obosomase Waterfall

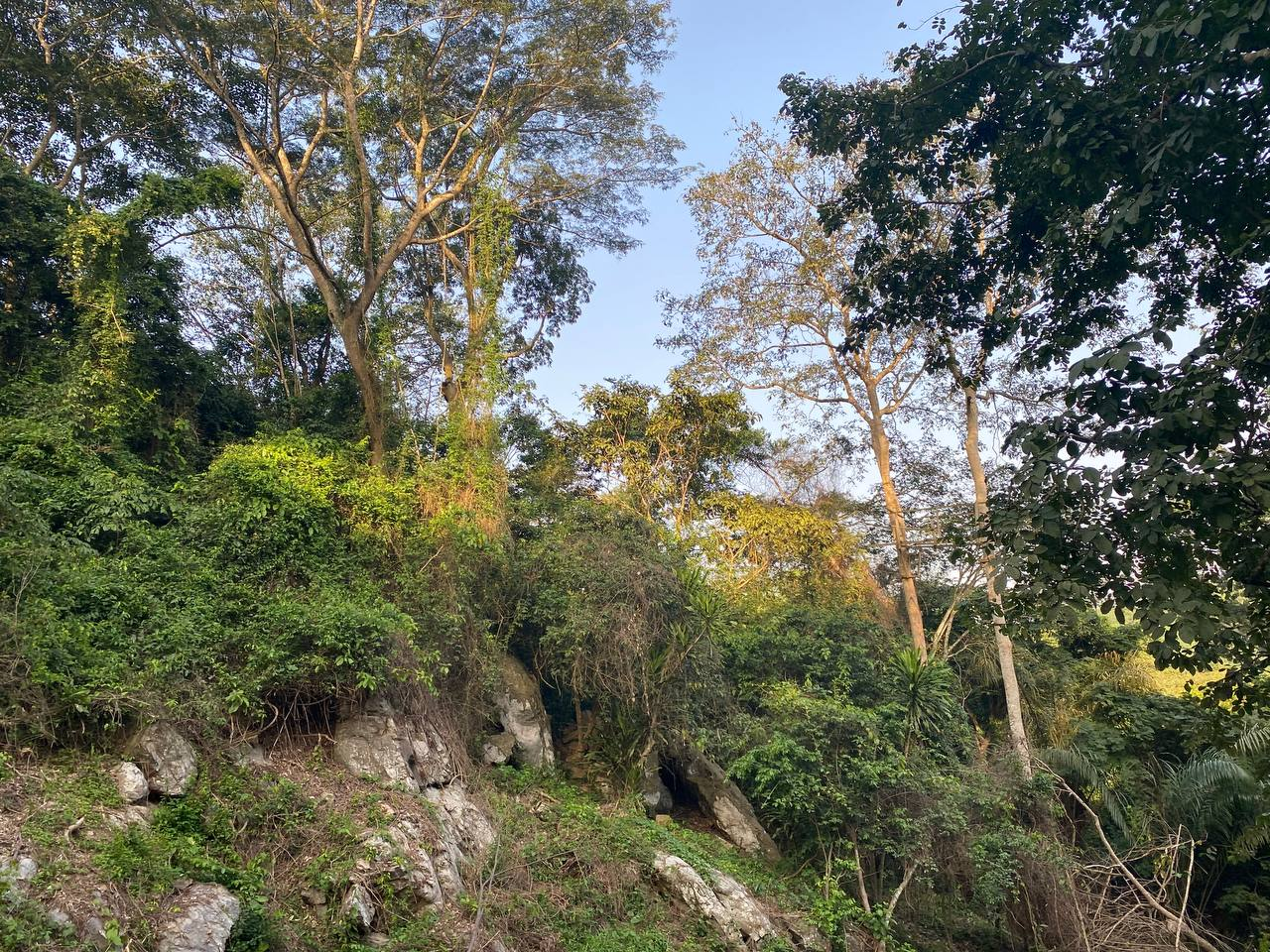
Trees around Obosomase Waterfall

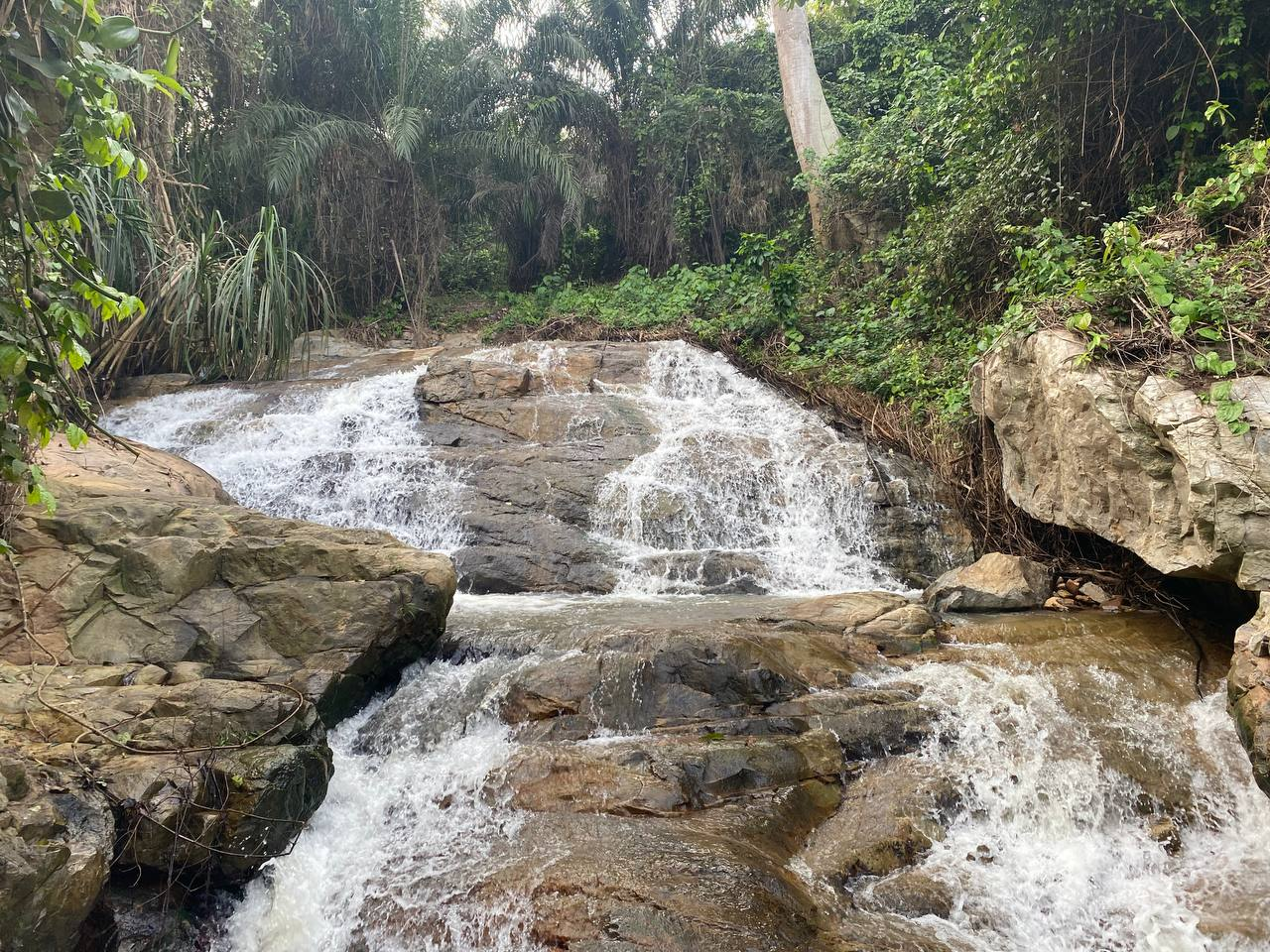
Obosomase Waterfalls )

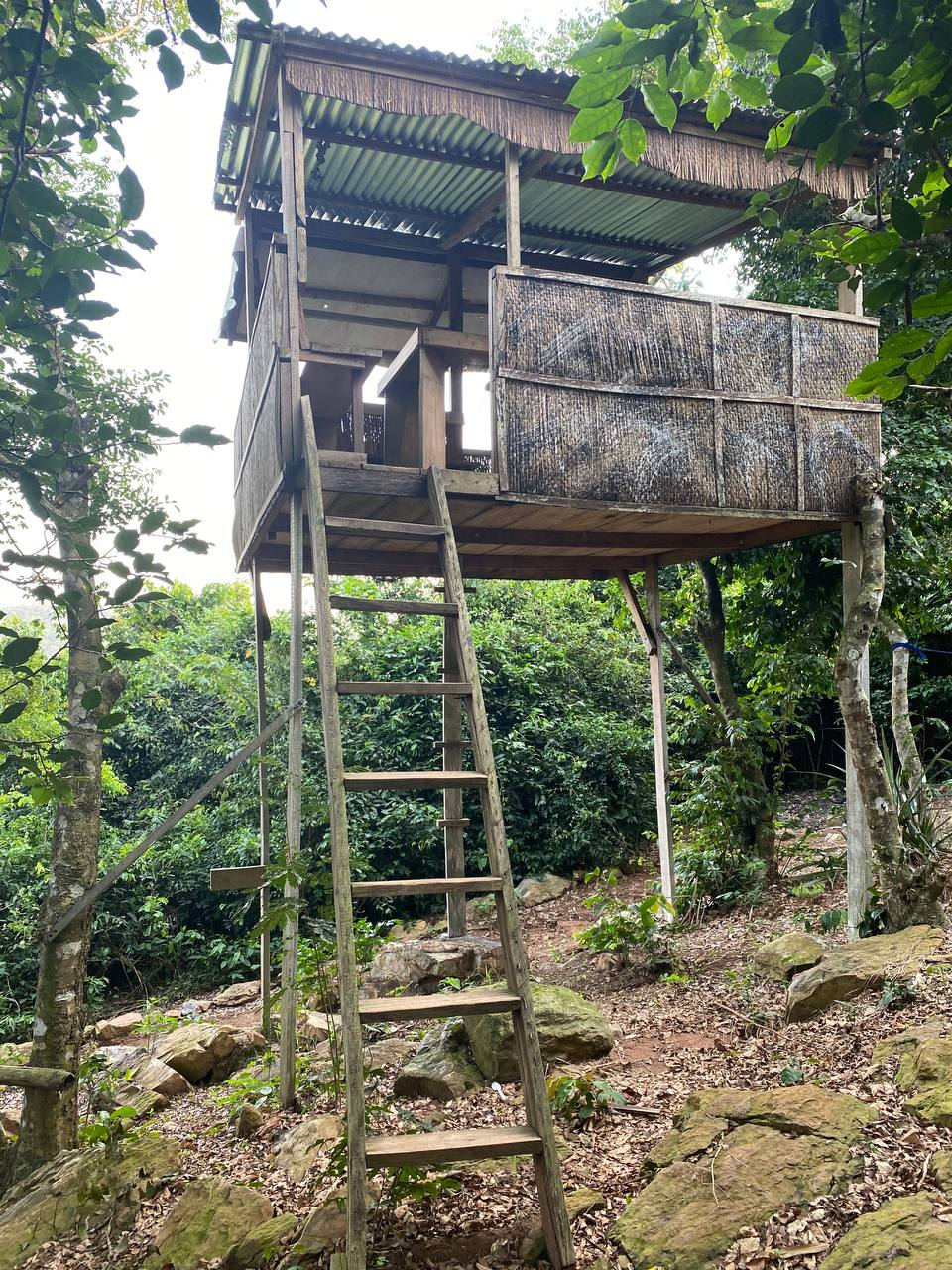
Tree house at Obosomase Waterfalls

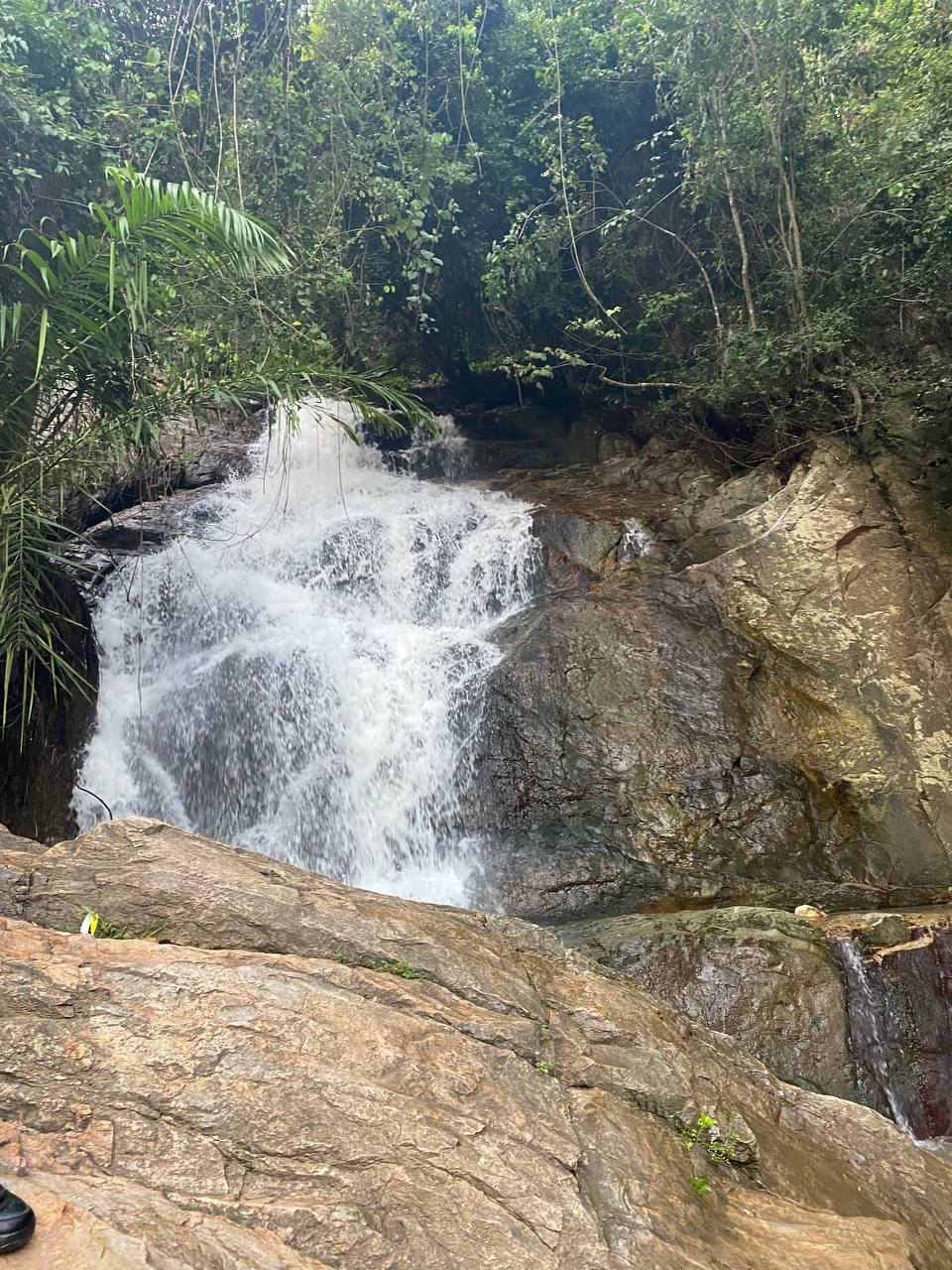

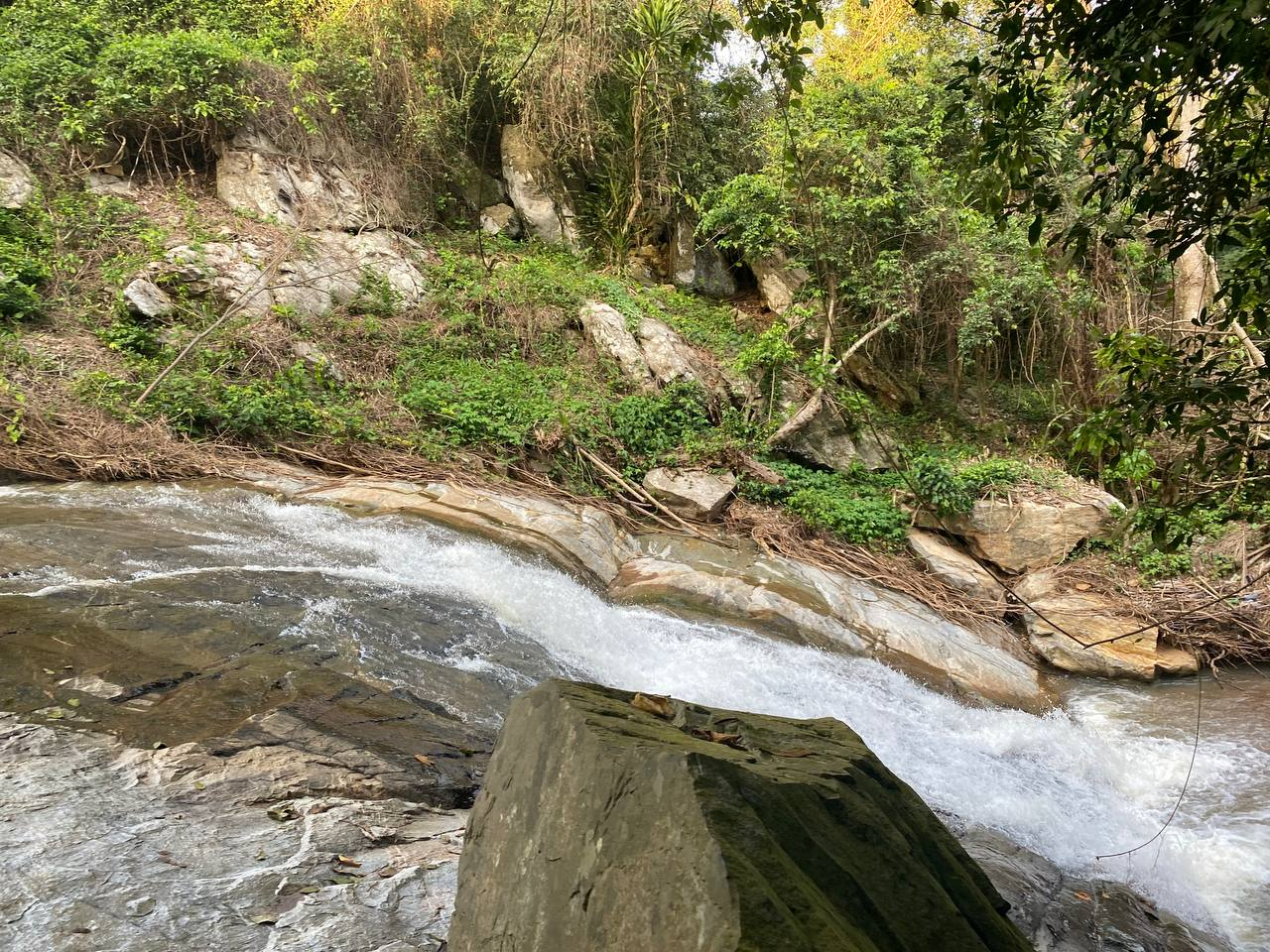
