= William Ofori Boafo =

Ghanaian politician

Hon. William Ofori Boafo
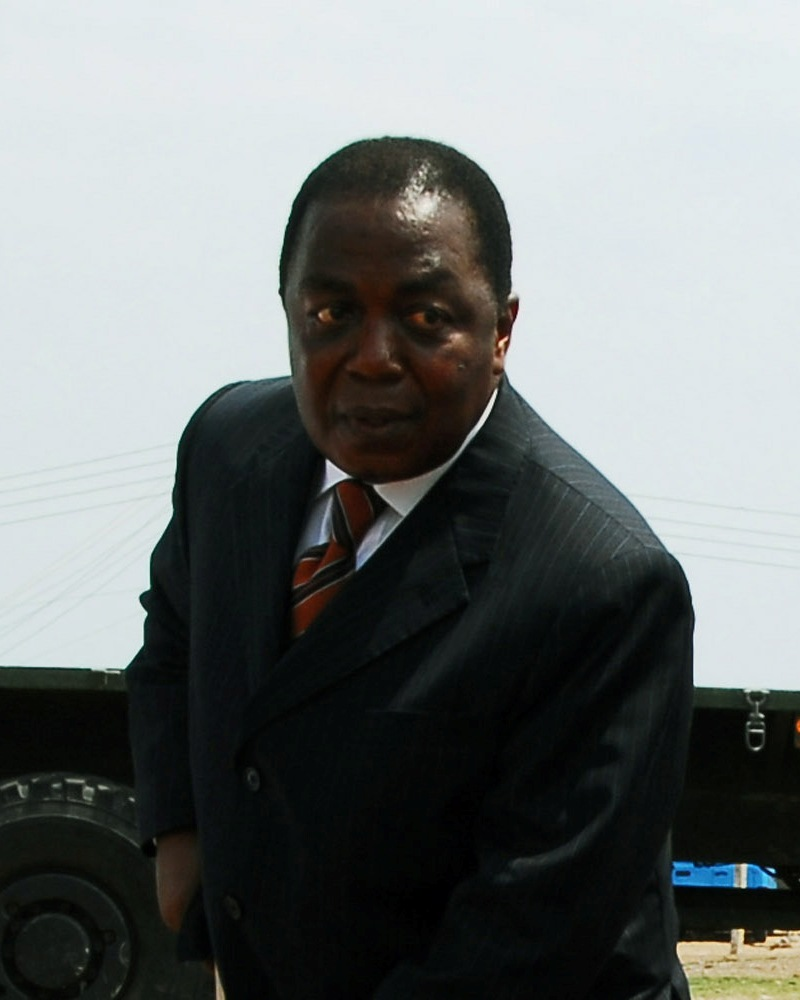
- William Ofori Boafo

Member of the Ghana Parliament for Akropong Constituency
- In office January 7, 2013 – January 6, 2017
- President: John Mahama

Member of Parliament for Akropong Constituency
- In office January 7, 2009 – January 6, 2013
- President: John Atta Mills; John Mahama

Member of Parliament for Akropong Constituency
- In office January 7, 2005 – January 6, 2009
- President: John Kufuor

Personal details
- Born: December 30, 1946 (age 79)
- Party: New Patriotic Party
- Education: University of Ghana, Ghana School of Law
- Profession: Lawyer

William Ofori Boafo (born December 30, 1946) is a lawyer and Ghanaian politician. He was the Member of Parliament representing Akropong Constituency in the Eastern region of Ghana in the 4th, 5th and 6th Parliament of the 4th Republic of Ghana.

== Early life and education ==
Boafo was born on December 30, 1946. He hails from Akropong, a town in the Eastern region of Ghana. He is a product of the University of Ghana. He obtained a Bachelor of Law degree from the university. This was in 1969. He is also a product of the Ghana School of Law where he furthered his law education and had Bachelor of Law degree. This was also in 1970.

== Career ==
Boafo is a lawyer by profession. He was a partner at Onimpa Akouku & Company.

== Politics career ==
Boafo is a member of New Patriotic Party. He was a member of the 4th, 5th and 6th parliament and also a current member of the 7th Parliament of the Republic of Ghana assuming office in January 2005. He contested for re-election into the Akropong Constituency Parliamentary seat in all subsequent Ghanaian General Elections and won them. He represents his Constituency till date. He was a committee member for Defence and interior, Standing Orders

== Elections ==
Boafo was elected as the member of parliament for the Akropong constituency of the Eastern Region of Ghana for the first time in the 2004 Ghanaian general elections. He won on the ticket of the New Patriotic Party. His constituency was a part of the 22 parliamentary seats out of 28 seats won by the New Patriotic Party in that election for the Eastern Region. The New Patriotic Party won a majority total of 128 parliamentary seats out of 230 seats. He was elected with 21,655 votes out of 34,199 total valid votes cast equivalent to 63.3% of total valid votes cast. He was elected over Ohene Nyarkoh of the People's National Convention, Richie Agyemfra-Kumi of the National Democratic Congress, Kwabena Awuku-Lokko of the Convention People's Party and Ronni Nanan Esi Botsio an independent candidate . These obtained 0%, 28.9%, 3.7% and 4% respectively of total valid votes cast.

In 2008, he won the general elections on the ticket of the New Patriotic Party for the same constituency. His constituency was part of the 19 parliamentary seats out of 28 seats won by the New Patriotic Party in that election for the Eastern Region. The New Patriotic Party won a minority total of 109 parliamentary seats out of 230 seats. He was elected with 20,245 votes out of 34,350 total valid votes cast equivalent to 58.94% of total valid votes cast. He was elected over Hawa Isaka of the People's National Convention, Anthony Gyampo of the National Democratic Congress, Augustus Osae-Akonnor of the Convention People's Party Samuel Apenteng an independent candidate. These obtained 0.85%, 30.64%, 6.75% and 2.82% respectively of the total votes cast.

== Personal life ==
Boafo is married with one child. He is a Christian (Presbyterian).
