= Oseadeeyo Kwasi Akuffo III =

Ghanaian traditional ruler

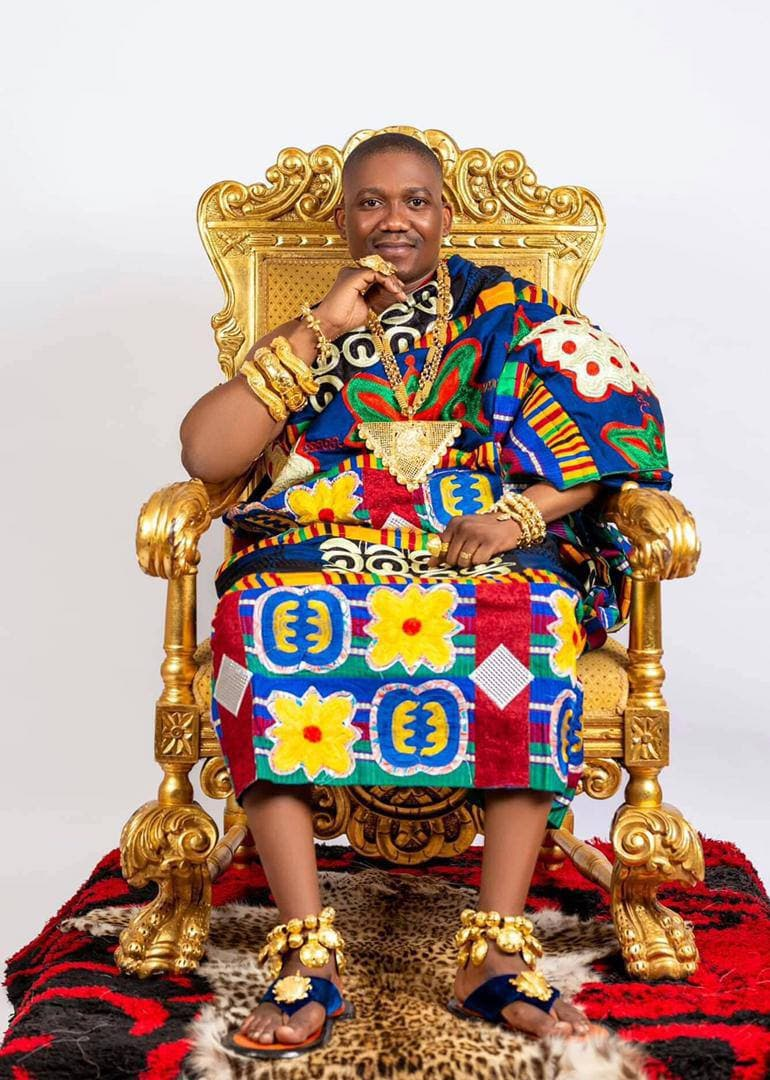
- Photo of the chief of Akropong

Omanhene of the Akuapem Kingdom (Ghana)
- Incumbent
- Assumed office 3 May 2020
- Preceded by: Oseadeyo Addo Dankwa III

Personal details
- Born: February 24, 1986 (age 40) Ghana
- Website: okuapehene.com

Oseadeeyo Kwasi Akuffo III (born Odehye Kwadwo Kesse Antwi; 24 February 1986) is a Ghanaian traditional ruler and the Paramount Chief of the Akuapem Traditional Area in Ghana. He is the 26th occupant of the Ofori Kuma Stool. He is a member of the Eastern Regional House of Chiefs.

== Early life and education ==
Akuffo was born Odehye Kwadwo Kesse on 24 February 1986 to Alex Antwi, a royal of the Agona clan in Akroso-Ntonaboma and Cynthia Agyemang, also a royal, from the Sakyiabia family in Akropong Akuapem (both in the Eastern Region). Akuffo attended Presbyterian Boys' Secondary School and proceeded to the Westchester Community College in Valhalla in the United States, where he earned an associate degree. He furthered his education at the Mercy College where he received a Bachelor of Science degree in Business Administration, with a specialization in Management. In 2015, he again enrolled at Mercy College for a master's degree in Human Resource Management but in 2016 was compelled to return to Ghana after the demise of his uncle and predecessor Oseadeeyo Nana Addo Dankwa.

== Career ==
Akuffo works as a managing partner and chief consultant at the Jupe Global Company Limited, a business consulting and venture capital firm.

== Reign ==
Akuffo ascended the Okuapeman stool (also known as the Ofori Kuma stool), under the stool name Oseadeeyo Kwasi Akuffo III on 3 May 2020, succeeding his late uncle Oseadeyo Addo Dankwa III who died in 2015, after ruling for over 40 years. He is a member of the Sakyiabia royal family of Akropong Akuapem. Akuffo holds the official title of Okuapehene. He is currently regarded as the youngest Omanhene in Ghana.

== Personal life ==
Akuffo is married to Linda Kesse Antwi who is a native Asante Bekwai in the Ashanti Region and works with the Ministry of Foreign Affairs and Regional Integration.
