= Akropong =

Akropong Akuapim Akropong
- Town
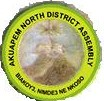
- Akuapim North District logo
- Nickname: Akrotown
- Motto: Kwakwaduam
- Location of Akropong in Eastern Region, Ghana
- Coordinates: 5°58′27″N 0°5′17″W
- Country: Ghana
- Region: Eastern Region
- District: Akuapim North District

Population (2013)
  - Total: 13,785
- Time zone: GMT
  - Summer (DST): GMT

Akropong is a town in South Ghana and the capital of the Akuapim North District, a district in the Eastern Region of South Ghana. It is known for producing snails and palm oil. Akropong has a 2013 settlement population of 13,785 people.

== History ==
Akropong was the site of a mission station run by the Basel Mission. Akwapim in which we see today became what it is from immigration and tribal wars. About 1300 A.D the Guan people came to settle in the Akwapim mountains from the Attara Finam which is in the Volta region.

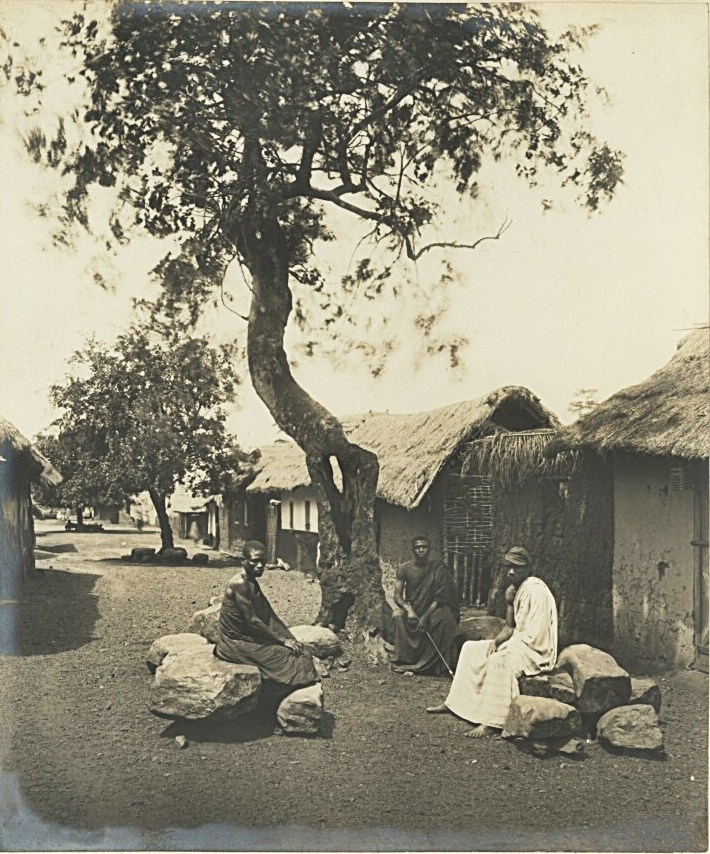
Street in Akropong, with trees under which elders sit for palavers, 1890s

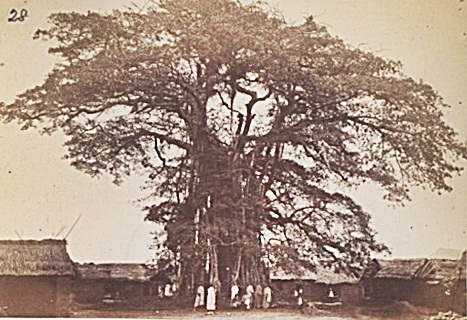
Banyan Tree in Akropong, 1870s

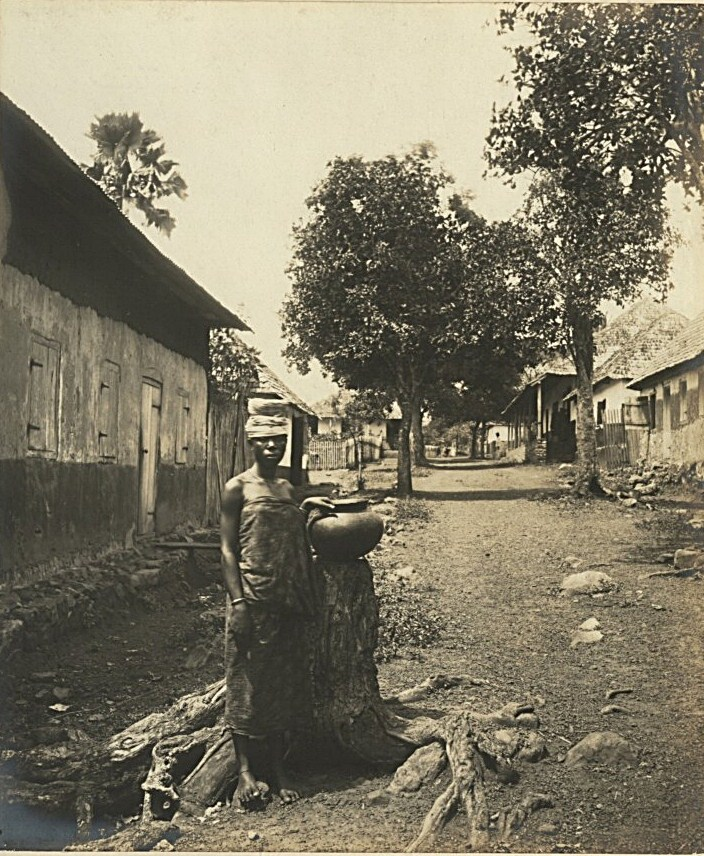
Basel Mission Street in Akropong, 1890s

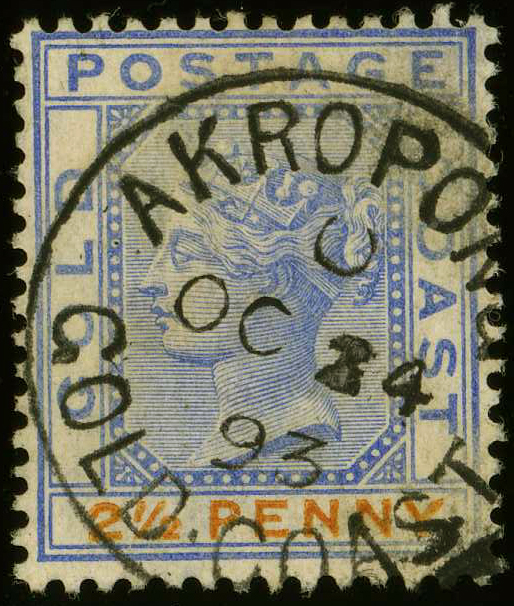
Postmark in 1893 on Gold Coast Victoria issue 1884

=== Akropong–Akuapem ===
Akropong and Akuapem are traditional states in South-Eastern Ghana. Following the Abotakyi Accord of 1733, the town of Akropong was established as a permanent settlement by Akyem people who were invited by the Hill Guan to provide protection against the Akwamu. The inhabitants of Akropong are direct descendants of these Akyem people, and the town serves as the seat of the Okuapehene (King of Akuapem). Under this arrangement, the state became a dual entity known as the Akropong–Akuapem State, where Akropong functions as the Akyem-populated capital within the wider multi-ethnic Akuapem traditional area.

The late King Oseadeeyo Addo Dankwa III of Akropong held the "sacred seat" of the Asona clan, one of the seven major Akan clans, for over thirty years. In 1730, the original Hill Guan inhabitants sought relief from Akwamu rule and requested the assistance of the Akyem. After the defeat of the Akwamu, the Akyem warriors and their families were allocated land at the present site of Akropong to inhabit permanently. This mandate was sealed in 1733 by a covenant between the Guan and the Akyem, establishing the Akyem royal dynasty at Akropong to provide centralized political and military leadership for the seventeen towns of the Akuapem Hills.

=== The Akan ===
49.1% of the population of Ghana are of the Akan Nations, the Akan nations are a linguistic group of West Africa. This group includes the Akuapem, the Akyem, the Ashanti, the Baoulé, the Bono/Brong, the Fante and the Nzema peoples covering the Bono and Bono East, Ashanti, Western, Central, and Eastern Regions, as well as portions of the midsection of the Volta Region, and into North Ghana. Cross-bordering into Togo, and covering Côte d'Ivoire Akan; Akye, Aowin and Baoulé nations in the southern, central and eastern region of Ivory Coast forming approximately 18-20% of the Ivory Coast population and related lines further into the neighboring francophone countries and into Nigeria, forming as collective kingdom nations tribal lines one of the largest major kingdom nations on the African continent. Temperatures range between 20 °C in August and 32 °C in March averaging approximately 23.88 °C.

From the 15th century to 19th century, the Akan people dominated gold mining and gold trade in the region. Akan art is wide-ranging and renowned, especially for the tradition of crafting bronze gold weights, which were made using the lost wax method of casting. Branches of the Akan include the Bono and the Afutu. The Akan culture is the most dominant and apparent in present-day Ghana.

The people of Akropong practise the matrilineal system of inheritance.

== Festival ==
The People of Akropong celebrate Odwira and this ceremony is usually held in September/October. Odwira is one of Ghana's many festivals that see attendance from people from all walks of life including the diaspora.

The Odwira Festival is a cultural event celebrating victory, gratitude, and harvest. Prior to its wider establishment in Ghana, it was historically celebrated by the communities of Akropong, Amanokrom, and Aburi in the Eastern Region.

=== Key cultural activities ===
- (Monday) The day of purification

Clearing of the path to Amanprobi – the First settlement established in 1730 by the Akyem warriors led by Nana Safori, who went on to become the First Okuapehene in 1733. This private ancient custom is led by the Abrafo (State Executioners) and their Chief, Adumhene. They usher in the Odwira with purification of the Kingdom with herbs.

- (Tuesday) The day of harvest

The parading of the harvest of new yams through the principal streets of Akropong, capital of Okuapeman accompanied by singing, drumming and dancing. The Abrafo stop periodically to break the new yams into pieces and leave on the streets for children and others to collect, cook and eat. In the late afternoon, the Abrafo amidst the firing of musketry return to Amanprobi to perform private rituals and then formally present the Odwira to Okuapehene who will be seated in state at the Palace with his Divisional and other sub-chiefs. On arrival at the Palace, the Abrafo go directly up to the Okuapehene who will be draped in a traditional cloth. Intense firing of musketry, drumming and dancing completes the traditional day of activities.

- (Wednesday) Opening of the Adae Butuw, Commemoration of the dead and the Cleansing of Stools and regalia in the Ademi River.

Activities for the day are preceded by drumming to signify the traditional lifting of the ban on noisemaking, imposed 40 days earlier in preparation for the Odwira festival. This sacred day is dedicated to the reconnection of the living and the dead. Traditional rulers, individuals, members of families and communities who died during the course of the year are honoured and mourned. This day also enables friends and sympathisers who could not attend funerals to symbolically pay their respects.

At 10pm, a curfew is imposed on Akropong. Under the cloak of symbolic darkness, the Abrafo take the Stools and regalia of Okuapeman to Ademi mu (the river) for the sacred cleansing rituals. On their return, they present themselves and the cleansed Stools as well as regalia. In this private ceremony, the Okuapehene symbolically strips naked, is wrapped in a sacred strip of cloth and he fires 3 rounds of a musket, signifying the close of the day.

- (Thursday) The day of Feasting

On this day, the pouring of libation in the Stool room and the presentation of a traditional menu – mashed yam, boiled eggs and salt free mutton is made. This solemn process is repeated at both Amanprobi and at Nsoremu (located on the boundary between Akropong and the Abiriw market, this is the site where the elders of the original Guan inhabitants met with the Akyem warriors and granted the latter, the right to both settle and govern as the Paramount Chief. Typically, a colourful procession including the Okuapehene, followed by the Krontihene and other Chiefs in order of seniority. They are led by maidens carrying bowls of food, water and schnapps.

The Okuapehene will usually sit in state in the Palace to receive homage from his Chiefs, Elders, Friends of Okuapeman, the Clergy, Government Officials, Members of the Diplomatic Corps and the public. The guests present traditional gifts of firewood, livestock, foodstuffs, drinks, clothes and money.

- (Friday) The Grand Durbar

The Chiefs, Elders and People of Okuapeman congregate at Mpeniase (the forecourt of the Okuapehene's Palace) to publicly pay homage. Attended by the Clergy, Government Officials and others, the Okuapehene presents a review of the year and outlines projects and development activities for the new year. The Okuapehene receives goodwill messages from the Government and his people, both at home and abroad.

== Transport ==
Akropong is north east of Accra, and the journey from Accra to Akropong is 1 hour.

Due to the altitude of Akropong, the climate is a lot cooler than neighbouring Accra. The road which climbs the hillside to Akropong is a toll road.

There is a higher charge for vans and lorries. From the road most of Greater Accra is visible below, although the one stopping space for pictures on this section of road has a "No Stopping" sign.

== Dance ==
They are notable for the famous Adowa dance.

== Clash with Abiriw ==
In 2002 – 2003, there was a clash between Abiriw and its neighbouring town Akropong. This disputes resulted in the death of many lives. This was 2002.

The dispute affected development activities in the otherwise peace-loving communities of the Akuapem State whose citizens wear broad smiles even in the face of extreme provocation.

Consequently, for 20 years the divisional chiefs of Aburi, Larteh and Adukrom refused to attend the Odwira Festival of the chiefs and people of Akuapem at Akropong.

=== Koforidua peace accord ===
The five divisional chiefs of Okuapeman on 27 August 2013 signed a peace accord in Koforidua and called on other chiefs and the people of the area to dedicate themselves to maintaining peace and unity among themselves.

The Koforidua Peace Accord brings to an end the 20-year-old chieftaincy dispute that has caused deep divisions among the chiefs and the people of the area.

The five chiefs, who signed the accord, as well as the Eastern Regional Minister, Ms Helen A. Ntoso, and her team that facilitated the mediation efforts, deserve commendation for a good work done.

== Chieftaincy dispute ==
Following the death of Nana Addo Dankwa III in 2015, Akropong has in recent years been embroiled in chieftaincy conflict and the chaotic manner in which his successor was destooled, and the subsequent enstoolment of the current occupant of the Akuapem stool.

The Okoman Council of the Akuapem Traditional Area, in the Eastern Region, appealed to President Nana Addo Dankwa Akufo-Addo, to as a matter of urgency intervene in the chieftaincy dispute in Okuapeman, to ensure continuous peace in the area.

After the intervention by National Security, a seven-member committee was formed on December 22, 2017, by the Akuapem Traditional Council to resolve the chieftaincy dispute, but was later dissolved owing to death threats to some of the members.

The defunct committee was chaired by Otoobour Djan Kwasi II.

The Paramount queen mother, Nana Afua Nketiaa Obuo selected Odehyie Kwasi Akuffo and installed him as the new Okuapenhene, but another faction installed Nana Kese as the paramount chief.

Oseadeeyo Kwasi Akuffo III won and ascended the Okuapeman stool (also known as the Ofori Kuma stool), under the Oseadeeyo Kwasi Akuffo III on 3 May 2020, succeeding his late uncle Oseadeyo Addo Dankwa III who died in 2015, after ruling for over 40 years.

== Education ==
Akropong has several educational institutions across all the town. The first teachers training college in Ghana, Presbyterian Training College is located in Akropong. The Presbyterian Church has a university in the town as well.

Akropong is also known for its Special education for the blind (Akropong School for the Blind).

Below are some of the many secondary schools in Akropong.

- H'Mount Sinai Senior High School
- Okaupeman Senior High School

== Notable people ==
- Sophia Akuffo
- William Ofori Boafo
- Edward Akufo-Addo (2nd president of Ghana) and father of Nana Akufo-Addo (13th president of Ghana)
- Oseadeeyo Kwasi Akuffo III
- Ed Reynolds, first black graduate of Wake Forest University
- George Darko, Burger-Highlife musician

== See also ==
- List of rulers of the Akan state of Akuapem

== Gallery ==
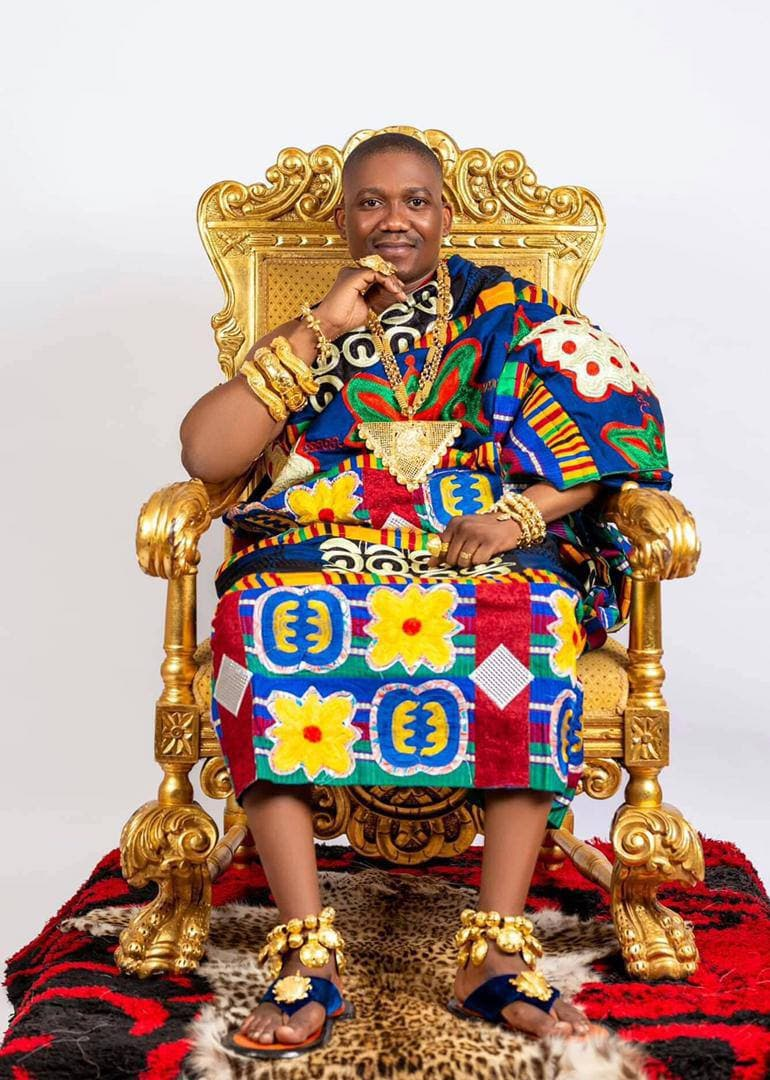
Chief of Akropong

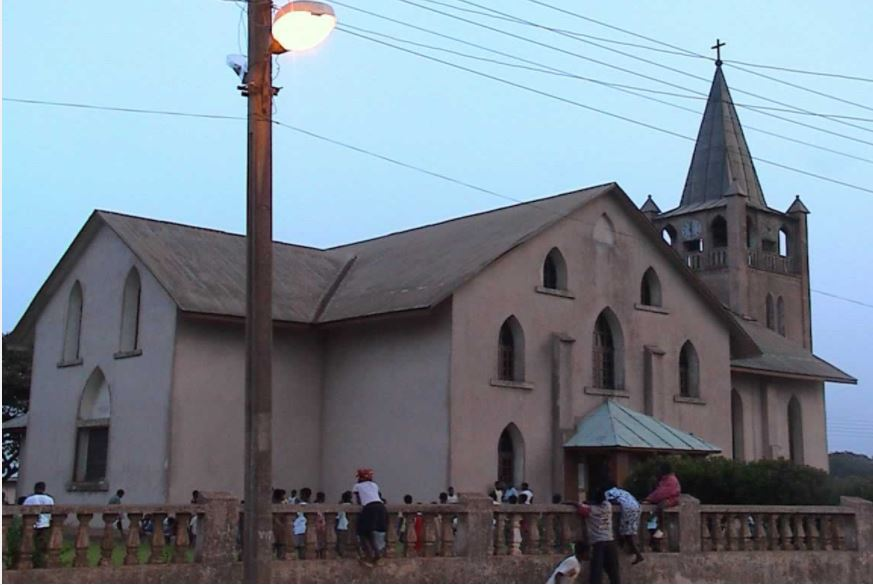
Christ Presbyterian Church Akropong

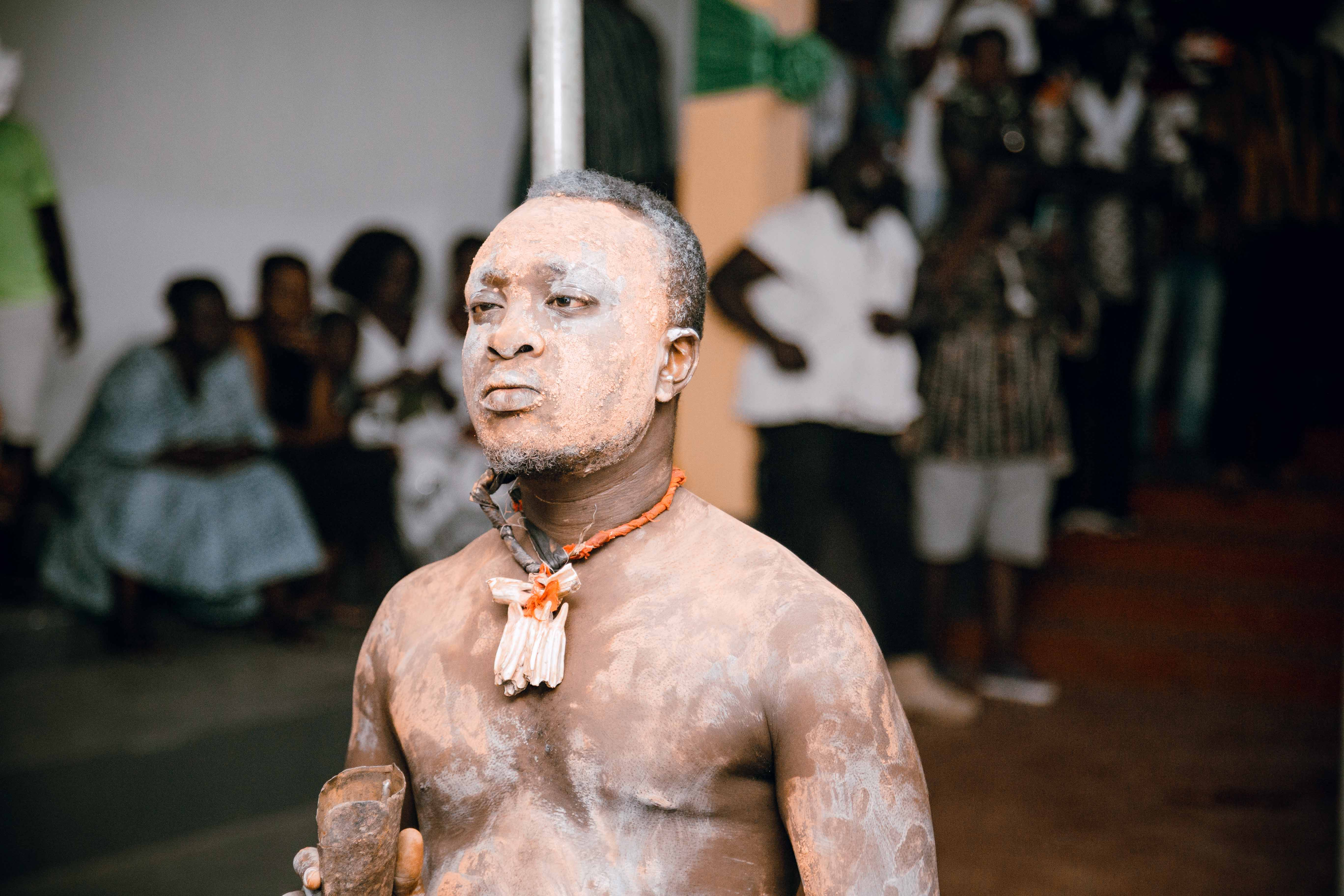
Obrafo - Traditional Executioner of the Akuapem Traditional Authority

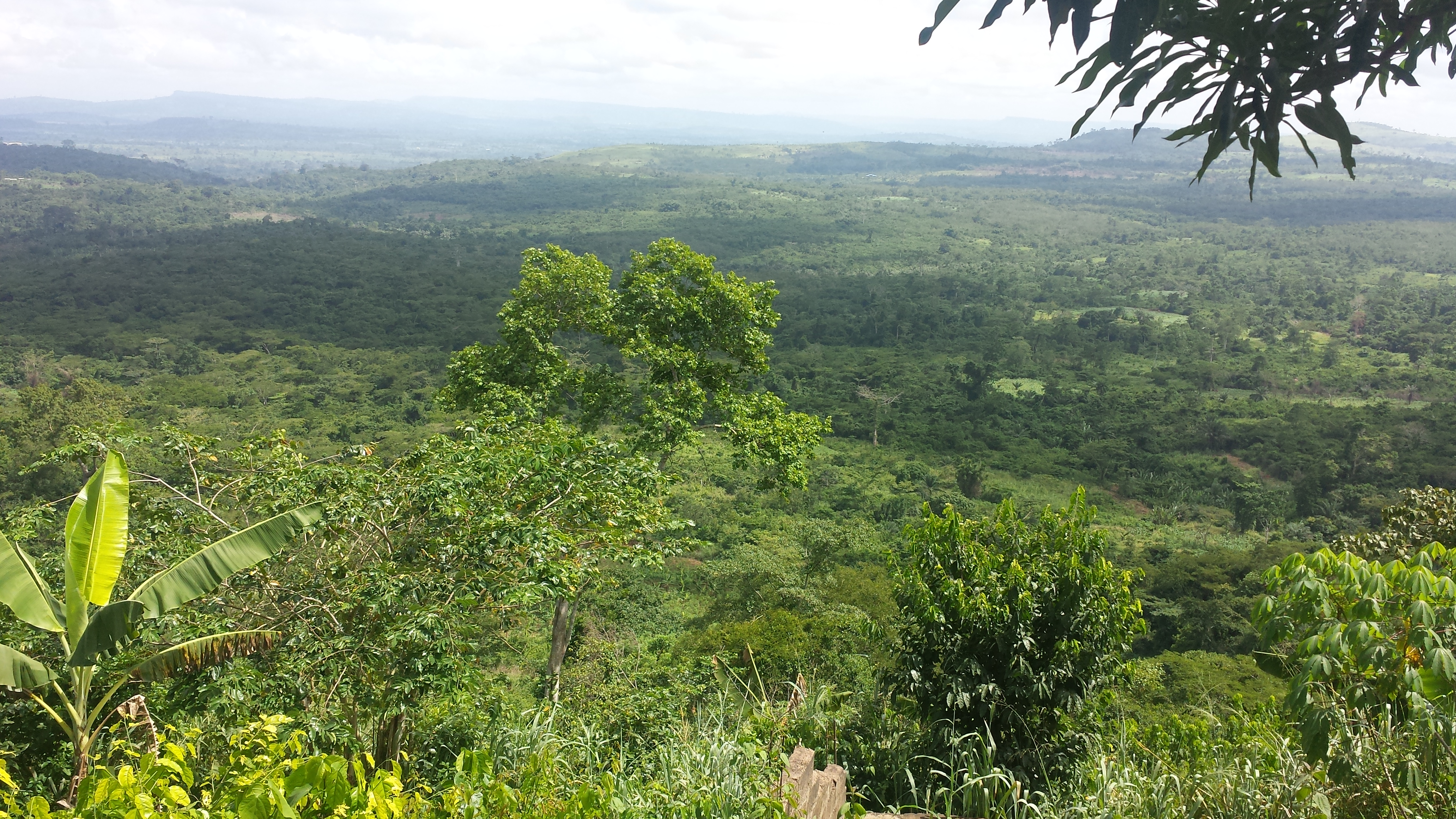
Akropong Green Landscape

== Bibliography ==
- Ministry of Culture and Chieftaincy Ghana West Africa.
- "Oseadeeyo Addo Dankwa III" information from Ghana Nation
- Wikipedia Open Library
- Akwapim North – Eastern Regional Official Website
