= Daddy Lumba discography =

- Studio albums: 23
- Compilation albums: 1
- Singles: 26
- Music videos: 25
- Collaborative albums: 8

The discography of Daddy Lumba consists of 23 studio albums, eight collaborative albums, one compilation album, 26 singles, and 25 music videos.

== Albums ==
=== Studio albums ===
Title	Album details
Obi Ate Meso Bo	Released: 1990; Label: Lumba Productions; Format: CD, digital download
Sika Asem	Released: 1991; Label: Lumba Productions; Format: CD, digital download
Playboy	Released: 9 August 1992; Label: Lumba Productions; Format: CD, digital download
Vida	Released: 1992; Label: Lumba Productions; Format: CD, digital download
Biribi Gyegye Wo	Released: 1993; Label: Lumba Productions; Format: CD, digital download
Odo Foforo	Released: 23 December 1994; Label: Lumba Productions; Format: CD, digital download
Sesee Wo Se	Released: 5 August 1995; Label: Lumba Productions; Format: CD, digital download
Mesom Jesus	Released: 4 August 1995; Label: Lumba Productions; Format: CD, digital download
Hwan Na Otene	Released: 5 August 1996; Label: Lumba Productions; Format: CD, digital download
Back For Good	Released: 14 December 1997; Label: Lumba Productions; Format: CD, digital download
Aben Wo Ha	Released: 1 December 1998; Label: Lumba Productions; Format: CD, digital download
Mato Odo Mu	Released: 2000; Label: Lumba Productions; Format: CD, digital download
Poison	Released: 3 August 2001; Label: Lumba Productions; Format: CD, digital download
Me Ma Afa Wotrim Ne	Released: 4 November 2002; Label: Lumba Productions; Format: CD, digital download
Bubra	Released: 15 December 2003; Label: Lumba Productions; Format: CD, digital download
Give Peace A Chance	Released: 2005; Label: Lumba Productions; Format: CD, digital download
Tokrom	Released: 15 December 2006; Label: Lumba Productions; Format: CD, digital download
Agenda	Released: 23 August 2007; Label: Lumba Productions; Format: CD, digital download
Sika	Released: 16 August 2008; Label: Lumba Productions; Format: CD, digital download
Awarepa Ye Anibre	Released: 22 August 2009; Label: Lumba Productions; Format: CD, digital download
Ko Hye Po	Released: 2011; Label: Lumba Productions; Format: CD, digital download
Awosoo	Released: 20 July 2014; Label: Lumba Productions; Format: CD, digital download
Enko Den	Released: 30 December 2016; Label: Lumba Productions; Format: CD, digital download

=== Collaborative albums ===
Title	Album details
Yee Ye Aka Akwantuom (with Nana Acheampong as the Lumba Brothers)	Released: 8 July 1989; Label: n.a.; Format: CD, digital download
Millenium Love Songs (with Ofori Amponsah)	Released: 1999; Label: Lumba Productions; Format: CD, digital download
Fa Woho Bo Jesus (with Selina Orleans)	Released: 2001; Label: Lumba Productions; Format: CD, digital download
Asee Ho (with Borax)	Released: 9 August 2002; Label: Lumba Productions; Format: CD, digital download
Odo Bewu Dee (with Borax)	Released: 2004; Label: Lumba Productions; Format: CD, digital download
Ahenfo Kyiniye (with Pat Thomas)	Released: 15 December 2004; Label: Lumba Productions; Format: CD, digital download
Area Boy (with Afua Ampofowaa)	Released: 2005; Label: Lumba Productions; Format: CD, digital download
Hosanna (with Kwadwo Ampong)	Released: 2015; Label: Lumba Productions; Format: CD, digital download

=== Compilation albums ===
Title	Album details
The Very Best of Daddy Lumba Vol. 1	Released: 1995; Label: Lumba Productions; Format: CD, digital download

== Videography ==
=== Music videos ===
Work cited

- Youtube.

Title	Year	Director	Artist(s)	Ref.
"Ofon Na Ɛdi Asɛm Fo"	2023	—		n.a.
"Enko Den"	2022	—		n.a.
"Awosoo"	2021	—		n.a.
"Wo Se Kete Bae Mu"	2021	—		n.a.
"Asie Ho"	2021	—	featuring Borax and Ivy Kyere	n.a.
"Esi So [Ku Me Preko]"	2021	—	featuring Ofori Amponsah	n.a.
"Bribi Gye Gye Wo"	2021	—		n.a.
"Enshie Wo"	2021	—	featuring Okyeame Kwame	n.a.
"Wokaekae Me"	2021	—		n.a.
"Sesee Wose"	2021	—		n.a.
"Ohia Asem"	2021	—		n.a.
"Nana Winner"	2021	—		n.a.
"Nea Woho Beto Wo"	2021	—		n.a.
"Aben Wo Ha"	2021	—		n.a.
"Back For Good"	2021	—		n.a.
"Children Of The Future"	2021	—		n.a.
"4 More for Nana" (stylized in all caps)	2020	—		n.a.
"Wo Beda Gee"	2020	—		n.a.
"Hwan Na Etwie" (Eye Me De Super)	2020	—		n.a.
"Odo Mmra Fie"	2020	—	featuring Ofori Amponsah	n.a.
"Wokaekae Me"	2020	—		n.a.
"Pony"	2020	—	featuring Ateaa Tina	n.a.
"Bubra"	2020	—		n.a.
"Biribi Gyegye Wo"	2020	—		n.a.
"Wo Ho Kyere"	2020	—		n.a.

== Singles ==
=== As lead artist ===
Title	Year	Album
"Gyama Abɔ Woso"	2024	Non-album single
"Nya Abotare Na Twen Awurade"	2023	Non-album single
"Rise Up And Shine, Black Stars" (featuring OD4)	2022	Non-album single
"Ofon Na Ɛdi Asɛm Fo"	2022	Non-album single
"4 More for Nana" (stylized in all caps)	2020	Non-album single
"Enko Den"	2016	Enko Den
"Awosoo"	2014	Awosoo
"Yentie Obiaa"	2014	Awosoo
"Hwan Ne Etwie"	2011	Ko Hye Po
"Nana Ye Winner"	2008	Non-album single
"Enshie Wo" (featuring Okyeame Kwame)	2006	Tokrom
"Wokaekae Me"	2005	Give Peace A Chance
"Wo Beda Gee"	2005	Give Peace A Chance
"Wokaekae Me"	2005	Give Peace A Chance
"Bubra" (with Ateaa Tina)	2003	Bubra
"Pony"	2003	Bubra
Asee Ho (with Borax)	2002	Asee Ho
"Wo Ho Kyere"	1999	Millenium Love Songs
"Odo Mmra Fie" (featuring Ofori Amponsah)	1999	Millenium Love Songs
"Esi So" (featuring Ofori Amponsah)	1999	Millenium Love Songs
"Aben Wo Ha"	1999	Millenium Love Songs
"Back For Good"	1997	Back For Good
"Wo Se Kete Bae Mu"	1997	Back For Good
"Children Of The Future"	1995	Sesee Wo Se
"Sesee Wo Se"	1995	Sesee Wo Se
"Biribi Gyegye Wo"	1992	Non-album single
"Ohia Asem"	1992	Playboy

== Other notable songs ==
2008

- "Makra Mo"

1993

- "Mpempem Do Me"

1990

- "Theresa"
