= Makra Mo =

Song by Daddy Lumba

from the album Biribi Gyegye Wo
- Language: Twi (Akan)
- Released: 1993
- Studio: Metra Studio, Koln
- Genre: Highlife
- Length: 6:27
- Label: Lumba Production
- Songwriter: Charles Kwadwo Fosuh (Daddy Lumba)
- Producer: Daddy Lumba

"Makra Mo" is a highlife song by Ghanaian musician Charles Kwadwo Fosuh, known professionally as Daddy Lumba. Released in 1993 as part of the album Biribi Gye Gye Wo, the song is a poignant reflection on mortality, friendship and the impermanence of life. Sung primarily in Twi, "Makra Mo" (translated as "I bid my farewells" in English), gained renewed attention following Daddy Lumba's passing on July 26, 2025, with many fans and commentators interpreting its lyrics as a prophetic farewell.

== Background and composition ==
Written, arranged, and produced by Daddy Lumba, the song was recorded at Metra Studio in Cologne, Germany. It was engineered by Connie and Frank of Metra Studio, with guitar work by Aquah Ampofo and Kweku Mensah.

The lyrics of "Makra Mo" are about life's transience, urging listeners to cherish shared moments. The song opens with lines like "Let's make this moment we share memorable" and "I bid my farewells, for you may never see me again." Lumba reflects on the inevitability of death with metaphors such as "The very wind that can make dry leaves fall, can blow harder and make verdant leaves also fall," suggesting that both young and old are vulnerable. He expresses concern for his legacy, pleading for his family— including his mother, Comfort Gyamfi (Ama Saah), and wife, Akosua Serwaa, to be cared for after his death.

== Reception and legacy ==
"Makra Mo" was well-received upon release and remains a standout Daddy Lumba's discography. It became a staple at funerals and reflective gatherings in Ghana.

Following Lumba's death on July 26, 2025, the song reached #1 on Apple Music Ghana's Top 100 Songs Chart.Fans and commentators noted its prophetic quality after Lumba's death, with social media posts describing it as a "message" left behind. Music producer Mark Okraku-Mantey remarked that the song feels like "someone standing by a dead body and mourning."

== Personnel ==
- Charles Kwadwo Fosuh (Daddy Lumba) – lead vocals, songwriter, arranger, composer, backing vocals, producer
- Frank of Metra Studio – recording engineer
- Connie of Metra Studio – recording engineer
- Metra Studio, Koln, Germany – recording location
- Aquah Ampofo - guitar
- Kweku Mensah - guitar

== See also ==
- Mpempem Do Me
- Theresa
- Ofon Na Edi Asem Fo
- Aben Wo Ha
- Yentie Obiaa
