= Oduro Ofrikyi =

Ghanaian politician

MP for Bekwai
- In office 7 January 1993 – 6 January 1997
- President: Jerry John Rawlings
- Preceded by: New
- Succeeded by: Alexander Agyei-Acheampong

Personal details
- Born: 6 October 1947 (age 78) Dominase, Ashanti Region Gold Coast (now Ghana)
- Party: National Democratic Congress
- Education: Agona SDA College of Education; University of Cape Coast
- Occupation: Politician
- Profession: Teacher

Oduro Ofrikyi (born 6 October 1947) is a Ghanaian politician and a member of the first parliament of the fourth republic representing the Bekwai constituency in the Ashanti Region of Ghana. He is represented the constituency on the ticket of the National Democratic Congress.

== Early life and education ==
Oduro Ofrikyi was born on 6 October 1947 at Dominase in the Ashanti Region of Ghana. He attended the SDA Training College, Agona and the University of Cape Coast, where he obtained his Bachelor of Arts degree in Education.

== Politics ==
Ofrikyi was elected to parliament on the ticket of the National Democratic Congress during the December 1992 Ghanaian parliamentary election for the Bekwai Constituency in the Ashanti Region of Ghana. He was succeeded by Alexander Agyei-Acheampong of the New Patriotic Party who in the 1996 general election, polled 28,313 votes out of the total valid votes cast representing 63.10% against Kwaku Poku-Agyeman of the National Democratic Congress (who defeated him in the primaries) who polled 7,301 votes representing 16.30%.

== Career ==
He is a teacher by profession and a former member of parliament for the Bekwai Constituency in the Ashanti Region of Ghana. He served one term as a parliamentarian for the Bekwai Constituency.

== Personal life ==
He is a Christian.
