= George Darko =

Ghanaian burger-highlife musician (1951–2024)

- Also known as: Nana Yaw Ampem Darko (Tufuhene of Akropong-Akuapim)
- Born: 12 January 1951; Akropong, Gold Coast
- Origin: Ghana
- Died: 20 March 2024 (aged 73) Akuapim-Mampong, Ghana
- Genres: Burger-highlife
- Occupation: Musician
- Instruments: Vocal, guitar

George Darko (12 January 1951 – 20 March 2024) was a Ghanaian burger-highlife musician, guitarist, vocalist, composer and songwriter, who was on the music scene from the late 1960s. A native of Akropong, Ghana, Darko was popular in the 1970s, 1980s and 1990s, and his songs are some of the most timeless and enduring highlife tracks in Ghana's music circles. Some of his contemporaries include Ben Brako, C.K. Mann, Daddy Lumba, Ernest Nana Acheampong, Nana Kwame Ampadu and Pat Thomas, among others. He was widely considered to be one of the pioneers of burger-highlife with his first hit "Ako Te Brofo" ("The Parrots Speak/Understand English") which was released in 1983. The song remains popular among Ghanaians both at home and abroad, and is still played at funerals and parties.

Son of a paramount chief, George Darko was educated at the Presbyterian School at Akropong. After playing for an army band entertaining troops in the Middle East, Darko returned to Ghana and formed the Golden Stool Band. In the late 1970s the band moved to Germany, where Darko went solo and formed the Bus Stop band in 1982. Returning to Akropong in 1988, he was made Tufuhene of Akropong-Akuapim in 1991 with the stool (throne) name of Nana Yaw Ampem Darko. In January 2010, he demanded and received apologies from a newspaper which had reported sex allegations in connection with him. He was the biological Father of the German Rapper and Singer Manuellsen.

== Early life and career ==
George Darko was a royal native of Akropong, Akuapem in the Eastern Region of Ghana. He began his musical as instrumentalist. His mastery of playing guitar made him fit for any band. His musical exploit started at a young age when he started making his own guitar from materials like wood, thread, wires and others. He later learned how to play guitar and passion took him to far places.

== Death ==
George Darko died on 20 March 2024, at the age of 73. He had been in palliative care at Tetteh Quarshie Memorial Hospital in Akuapim-Mampong for three months before his death.

== Discography ==
Studio albums

- Friends (1983, Taretone)
- Highlife Time (1983, Sacodisc International)
- Moni Palava (1986, A&B Records)
- Soronko (1988, Musicolor)
- Highlife in the Air (1994, Boulevard Records)
- Ebetoda (1998, One World Records)
- Come to Africa (2006, Okoman Records)
- No Weapon (2019, Okoman Records)

Contributing artist

- The Rough Guide to Highlife (2003, World Music Network)

== Awards ==
VGMA Lifetime Award for Outstanding Contribution to Highlife (2020).
