= The King's Music Room =

- Running time: 1:08:34 (Broadcast); 27:00 (Video Extras)
- Country of origin: United Kingdom & Commonwealth of Nations
- Home station: Apple Music
- Hosted by: King Charles III
- Executive producer: Eva Omaghomi
- Original release: 10 March 2025

The King's Music Room is a 2025 radio broadcast presented by King Charles III on Apple Music, that premiered on 10 March 2025 to coincide with the 2025 Commonwealth Day celebrations. The broadcast features narration by King Charles alongside a selection of the King's favourite songs and pieces of music from across the Commonwealth, with some other music from other parts of the world. The broadcast was recorded at Buckingham Palace in London, United Kingdom.

King Charles said that he had wanted to share "songs which have brought me joy" and that music had the ability to "bring happy memories flooding back from the deepest recesses of our memory, to comfort us in times of sadness, and to take us to distant places. But perhaps, above all, it can lift our spirits to such a degree, and all the more so when it brings us together in celebration".

== Music featured ==
Commonwealth Artists
Order	Song name	Artist	Country of Artist
1	Could You Be Loved	Bob Marley & The Wailers (Note: A rendition by the Welsh Guards Band of the King's Guard was also played during the introduction and trailer, in addition to the version by Bob Marley.)	Jamaica
2	My Boy Lollipop	Millie Small	Jamaica
3	The Loco-Motion	Kylie Minogue	Australia
4	The Very Thought of You	Al Bowlly	United Kingdom
5	La Vie En Rose	Grace Jones	Jamaica
6	Love Me Again	Raye	United Kingdom
7	Mpempem Do Me	Daddy Lumba	Ghana
8	Kante (feat Fave)	Davido	Nigeria
9	The Click Song	Miriam Makeba	South Africa
10	My Country Man	Jools Holland Ruby Turner	United Kingdom Jamaica
11	Indian Summer	Anoushka Hemangini Shankar	United Kingdom
12	Anta Permana	Siti Nurhaliza	Malaysia
13	E Te Iwi E (Call to the People)	Kiri Te Kanawa	New Zealand
14	Haven’t Met You Yet	Michael Buble	Canada
15	Hot Hot Hot	Arrow	Montserrat (United Kingdom)
Non-Commonwealth Artists
16	Crazy in Love (feat Jay-Z)	Beyonce	United States
17	Upside Down	Diana Ross	United States
