= Theresa (song) =

Song by Daddy Lumba

from the album Obi Ate Meso Bo
- Language: Akan
- Released: 1990
- Studio: Da Capo-Studio, Monheim, Germany
- Genre: Highlife
- Length: 5:39
- Label: Lumba Productions
- Songwriter: Charles Kwadwo Fosuh
- Producer: Daddy Lumba

"Theresa" is a highlife song recorded by Ghanaian musician Daddy Lumba, on his debut solo studio album, Obi Ate Meso Bo, released in 1990. Written, composed and produced by Daddy Lumba, the track is a tribute to his high school lover, Theresa Abebrese, who played a significant role in his early life and career.

== Background and composition ==
Daddy Lumba, born Charles Kwadwo Fosuh, met Theresa Abebrese during their time at Juaben Senior High School in the Ashanti Region of Ghana. In an interview published on his official YouTube channel, Lumba revealed that Theresa, also known as Nana Konadu, was drawn to his intellect and quiet demeanor. Their relationship blossomed, with Theresa providing him with essential support, including food and clothing, during their school years.

After completing secondary school, Theresa played a crucial role by facilitating his journey to Germany, contributing half of the ₵30,000 needed for his travel. This opportunity allowed Lumba to pursue his musical ambitions, leading to his successful career in the highlife genre.

The track also acknowledges a few other individuals who were important in Daddy Lumba's early life: Mary Agyekum of Asante Mampong Daaho, Akwasi Awuah of Nsuta Kyebi, and Charles Kwabena Garner together with his wife Akua Agyeiwaa.

== Legacy ==
Theresa remains one of Daddy Lumba’s most popular and critically acclaimed songs. As of July 2025, the lyrics video of the song on YouTube has garnered over 3 million views.

The song has become synonymous with gratitude in Ghanaian pop culture and social media. Theresa Abebrese died in 2017 at the age of 53. Daddy Lumba attended her funeral in Bohyen, Kumasi.

== Personnel ==
- Charles Kwadwo Fosuh (Daddy Lumba) – lead vocals, songwriter, arranger, composer, backing vocals, drum programming, producer
- Heinz Fröhling – keyboards, guitar
- Dirk Mallwitz – recording engineer
- Jose Halenta – recording engineer
- Da Capo-Studio, Monheim, Germany – recording location
- Kofi Addo Andy – arranger, master percussionist

== See also ==
- Mpempem Do Me
- Ofon Na Edi Asem Fo
- Aben Wo Ha
- Yentie Obiaa
