= Emmanuel Whajah =

Ghanaian-German videographer and photographer (born 1993)

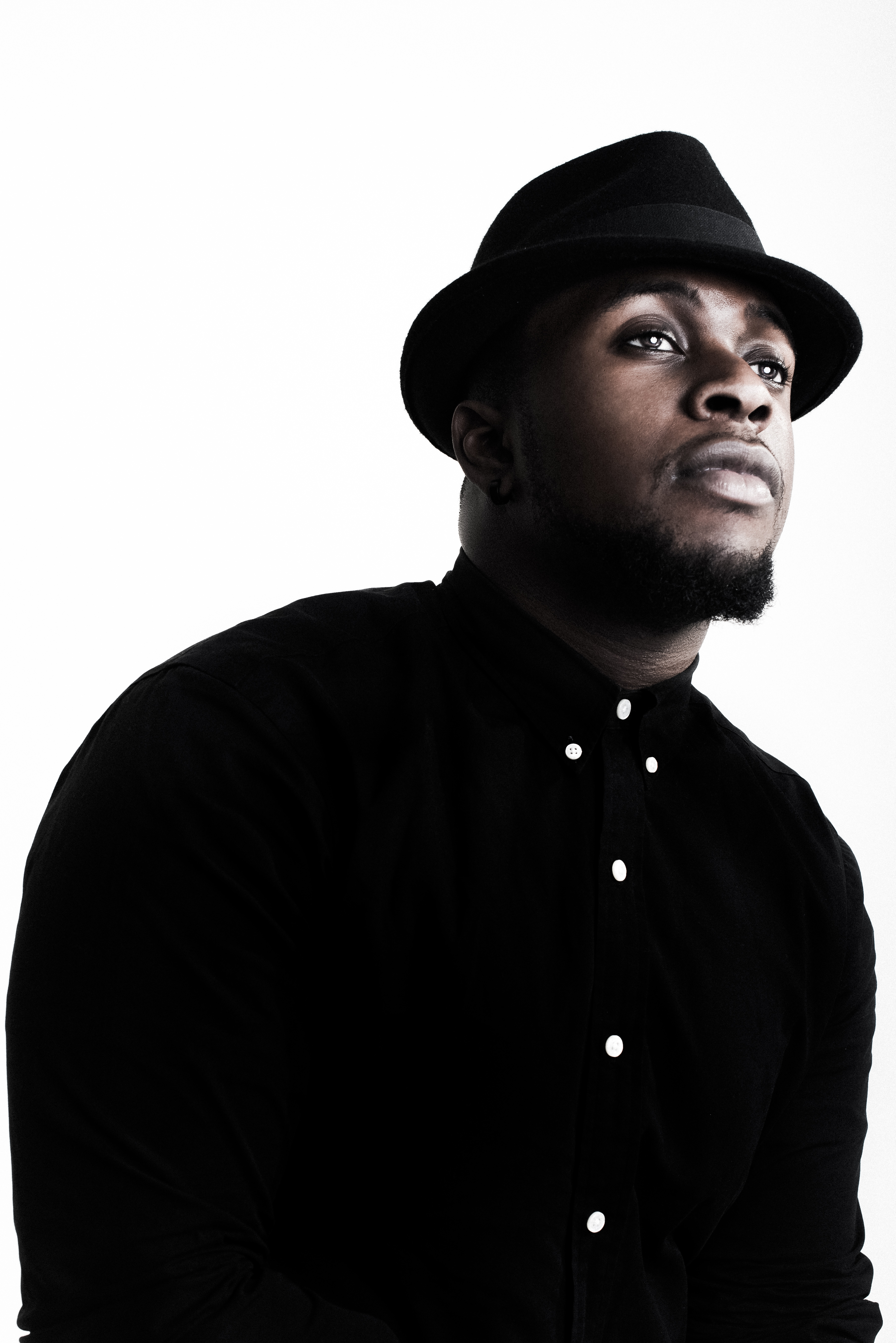
- Born: Emmanuel Whajah; August 18, 1993 (age 33); Hannover, Germany
- Occupations: Creative director, film director, photographer
- Known for: Film directing
- Website: https://emmanuelwhajah.com

Emmanuel Whajah is a Ghanaian-German videographer and photographer based in Germany. In 2021 he won the High Performance award (HIPE Award) in Germany. He is founder of Play The Game, a social media agency.

== Background ==
Whajah was born in August 1993 in Hanover, Germany where he grew up. He started his career as a video producer in Hanover as well as a dancer in 2006 and participated in Hip-hop dance Championships and he won Northern German Champion and European Champion in Hip Hop Solo Adults Boys four times in 2015.

Whajah began his professional career in 2012, he started directing dance videos and he established Emzyproductionfilms the same year. His first project was when he filmed the Les Twins when there were on tour with Beyoncé then went on to film their European tour. From then, Whajah has done tour photography and videography for several prominent artists including Tyga, Rita Ora, Ne-yo, Eric Bellinger, Keke Palmer, Migos, Ella Mai, Lauryn Hill, Lil Yachty, Burna Boy, Tory Lanez, Kid Ink and Jorja Smith. He has won several recognition awards for best video director, best photographer including the HIPE Award for Best Service in the German media industry in 2021.

In 2022 he established a content production initiative for footballers called Play The Game which created campaign content for Nike featuring Bayern Munich players Leroy Sane, Jamal Musiala and Alphonso Davies. In January 2023, Emmanuel was awarded HIPE Story Award 2022.

In 2023, Emmanuel Whajah was listed in the Forbes Africa 30 Under 30. Whajah has also worked as a content creator for Rolling Stone Africa. In 2026 he was nominated in the Creative Excellence category of The Future Awards Africa.
