= Felix Owusu =

- Origin: Takoradi
- Genres: Highlife
- Occupation: Musician
- Years active: 1992-present

Felix Owusu is a Ghanaian highlife musician, performer and a songwriter. He is popularly known for songs like "Woaben", "Okwantuni" and "Eshow Me".

== Life and career ==
Born and bred in Takoradi, Felix commenced his musical journey with the Takoradi-based band Osabarima, where he played with individuals such as Kofi Hanson and Shasha Marley of 'Maata' fame.

In 1992, Felix Owusu met Daddy Lumba at the Labadi Beach hotel during Independence Day. After a short interaction, the two recorded Felix's first album titled Vida. The songs on the album include the title track featuring Daddy Lumba and Oheneba Kissi, "Nya Asem Hwe (feat. Oheneba Kissi)", "Manopa nsu", "Menyame meda wase" and "Emefa Me Nko Gyae Me", which was solely sung by Lumba, with Oheneba Kissi providing backing vocals. Daddy Lumba produced the album.

In 1996, he released his most popular album, E Show Me with hit tracks like "Happy Birthday", "Okwantuni" among others, recorded in London.

Felix Owusu so far has about 14 albums to his credit, including Vida, Mensu, Sika, E-show me, Forever love, Bra and Woaben.

In 2024, he released 'Seniwa' featuring Quarmy Zaggy.

== Personal life ==
Felix Owusu is currently based in Atlanta, USA, and has been in the state for over two decades. He is married with three children.

== See also ==
- Sasha Marley
- Daddy Lumba
- Highlife
