= Gyimah =

Gyimah is a surname. Notable people with the surname include:

- Alex Asamoah Gyimah (born 1986), Ghanaian footballer
- Charles Allen Gyimah (1939–2014), Ghanaian politician and businessman
- Dorcas Gyimah (born 1992), Ghanaian sprinter
- Edwin Gyimah (born 1991), Ghanaian footballer
- Kwabena Gyimah-Brempong (born 1949), Ghanaian economist
- Nicky Gyimah (born 2003), Ghanaian-English footballer
- Prince Gyimah (born 1990), Ghanaian footballer
- Sam Gyimah (born 1976), British politician
- Samuel Nkrumah Gyimah (born 1952), Ghanaian politician
- Emmanuel Gyimah Labi (born 1953), Ghanaian composer and academic
- Phyll Opoku-Gyimah (born 1974), British activist
- Nana Owusu-Gyimah, English footballer
