= Oheneba Kissi =

Ghanaian highlife musician

- Genres: Highlife
- Occupations: Musician; songwriter
- Years active: 1990–present

Oheneba Kissi is a Ghanaian highlife musician, songwriter, and performer. He has been a prominent figure in the Ghanaian music industry for over three decades.

== Career ==
He released his first album, 'Suzy' in 1990. A year after, he followed it with 'Ebeye Yie', and Anibre the following year.

After a two-year break, he made a comeback with 'Odo Licence' in 1994, followed by 'Asem Ne Me a' in 1995. The year 1997 saw the release of Bese Mono, and in 1998, 'Today and Yesteryears' was presented to the audience, followed by 'Medo Hemaa' in 1999.

Oheneba Kissi followed up in 2001 with 'Ka Biribi Kyere Me' and two other chart-topping albums 'ABC of Love' and 'Fre No Ma Me' in 2002 and 2003 respectively.

Oheneba Kissi has a total of 13 albums to his credit, the latest of which was released in 2008.

Oheneba Kissi was also featured on Felix Owusu's debut album 'Vida', released in 1992. The album was produced by Daddy Lumba.

== Personal life ==
Oheneba Kissi is an accountant by profession, but had to quit to do music full time.

His roots are in Obo Kwahu, Eastern Region, Ghana, although he resided in Nkoranza and Techiman during his early years. He is married with children.

== Discography ==
- Suzy (1990)
- Odo Licence (1994)
- Asem Ne Me Ara (1995)
- Bese Mono (1997)
- Today and Yesteryears (1998)
- Medo Hemaa (1999)
- Kabribi Kyere Me (2001)
- ABC of Love (2002)
- Fre No Ma Me (2003)
- Abana Ba (2005)
- Kyere Me (2008)

== See also ==
- Highlife Music
- Ghanaian songs
- Kojo Antwi
- Daddy Lumba
