= Joseph Osei-Owusu =

Ghanaian lawyer and politician

Joseph Osei Owusu
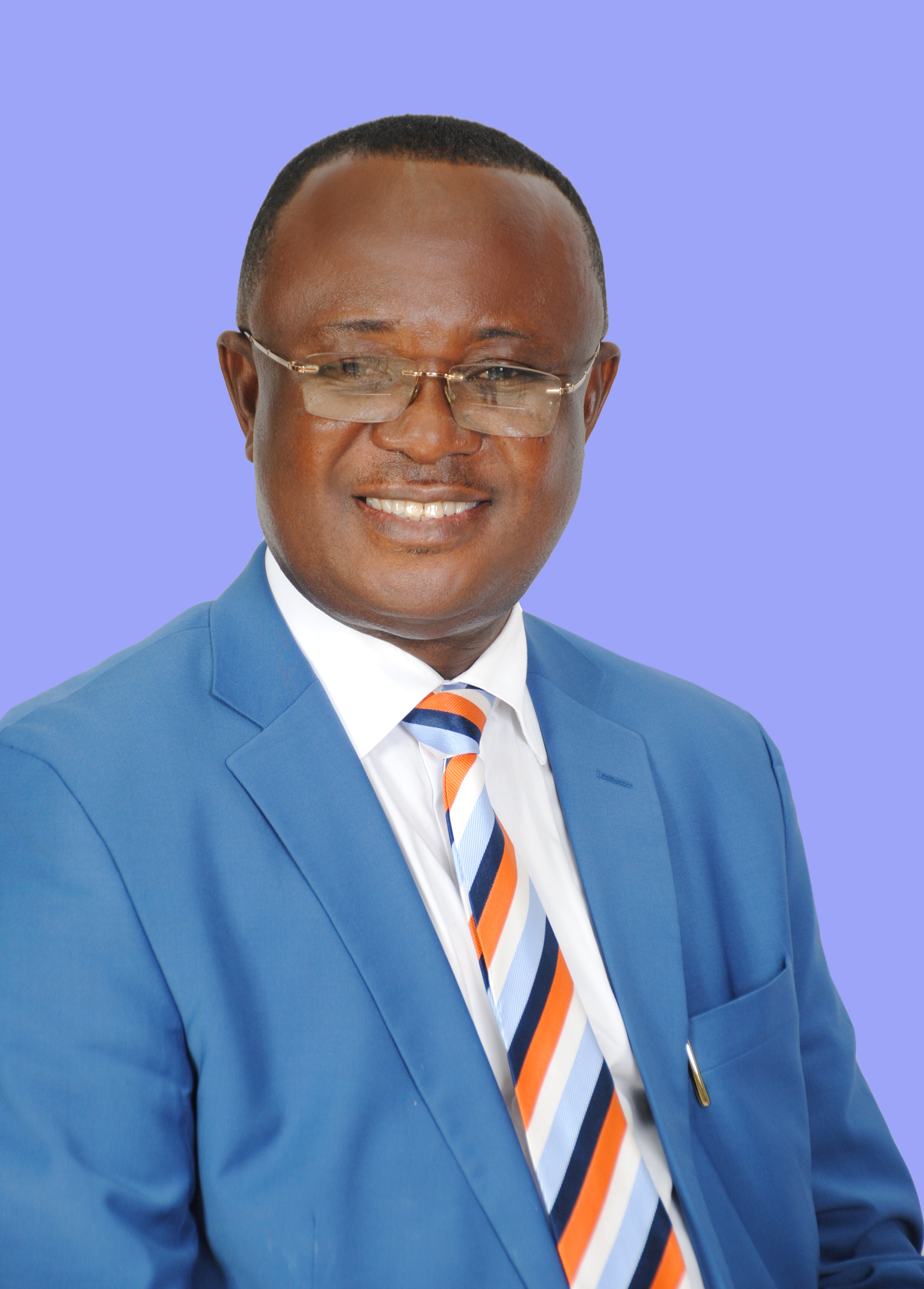

First Deputy Speaker of Parliament
- In office 7 January 2017 – 6 January 2026
- Preceded by: Ebo Barton-Odro
- Succeeded by: Ralph Poku-Adusei

Member of Parliament for Bekwai Constituency
- Incumbent
- Assumed office 7 January 2009

Personal details
- Born: 22 January 1962 (age 64) Bekwai
- Party: New Patriotic Party
- Education: University of Ghana, Legon
- Profession: Lawyer; Politician

Joseph Osei-Owusu (born 22 January 1962, in Bekwai) is a Ghanaian lawyer, and politician. He was the first deputy speaker of the 8th Parliament of the 4th Republic and also the former Member of Parliament for the Bekwai constituency in the Ghanaian Parliament.

== Early life and education ==
Osei-Owusu was born on 22 January 1962 had his basic education in his hometown, Bekwai. He had his O-level secondary school education at Juaben Secondary School in Juaben in the Ashanti Region in 1981. In 1983, he also had his A-level in Wenchi Secondary School. He then went on to have a Bachelor of Arts (BA) Classics and Law from the University of Ghana in 1987, a Barrister of Law (BL) from the Ghana School of Law in 1989 and an Executive master's degree in Governance and Leadership from the Ghana Institute of Management and Public Administration (GIMPA) in 2007.

== Career ==
Osei-Owusu has worked as a lawyer for 29 years in Ghana after being called to the bar in 1990. He started his career in the chambers of Yaw Barimah & Co and later joined George Sarpong Legal Services where he rose to become Assistant Head of Chambers. He later became chief executive officer (CEO) of the Driver and Vehicle Licensing Authority (DVLA), a political appointment he got during the tenure of John Agyekum Kufour.

=== First Deputy Speaker ===
He was elected the First Deputy Speaker of the 7th Parliament of the 4th Republic and re-elected to that position for the 8th Parliament. He first became an MP in 2009, after being elected with 86.06% of the total valid votes cast.

==== Committees ====
He is currently the chairperson for Privileges Committee and also the Appointments Committee in parliament. He is also a member of Standing Orders Committee and the Roads and Transport Committee.

== Personal life ==
Osei-Owusu is a Christian.
