= Ralph Poku-Adusei =

Ghanaian politician

Hon. Ralph Poku-Adusei MP

Member of Parliament for Bekwai
- Incumbent
- Assumed office 7 January 2025
- Preceded by: Joseph Osei-Owusu
- President: John Mahama
- Vice President: Jane Naana Opoku-Agyemang

Personal details
- Born: 6 April 1982 (age 44)
- Party: New Patriotic Party
- Occupation: Politician

Ralph Poku-Adusei (born 6 April 1982) is a Ghanaian lawyer and politician. He is the member of parliament-elect for Bekwai (Ghana parliament constituency) in the Ashanti region of Ghana. He represents the constituency in the Ninth Parliament of the Fourth Republic of Ghana as a member of the New Patriotic Party.

== Early life and education ==
Ralph attended The Honourable Society of the Middle Temple, Manchester Metropolitan University, the University of Law (formerly the College of Law of England and Wales), the Ghana School of Law, and Kwame Nkrumah University of Science and Technology (KNUST).

== Career ==
Ralph Poku-Adusei is the Managing Partner of Trent Legal Amansie Chambers. He is a member of the Ghana Bar Association, the Bar of England and Wales, and the International Bar Association. He is a member of the New Patriotic Party and currently the member of parliament-elect for the Bekwai (Ghana parliament constituency) in the Ashanti region of Ghana.

== See also ==
- Joseph Osei-Owusu
