= Ọbádélé Bakari Kambon =

Ghana-based linguist and academic

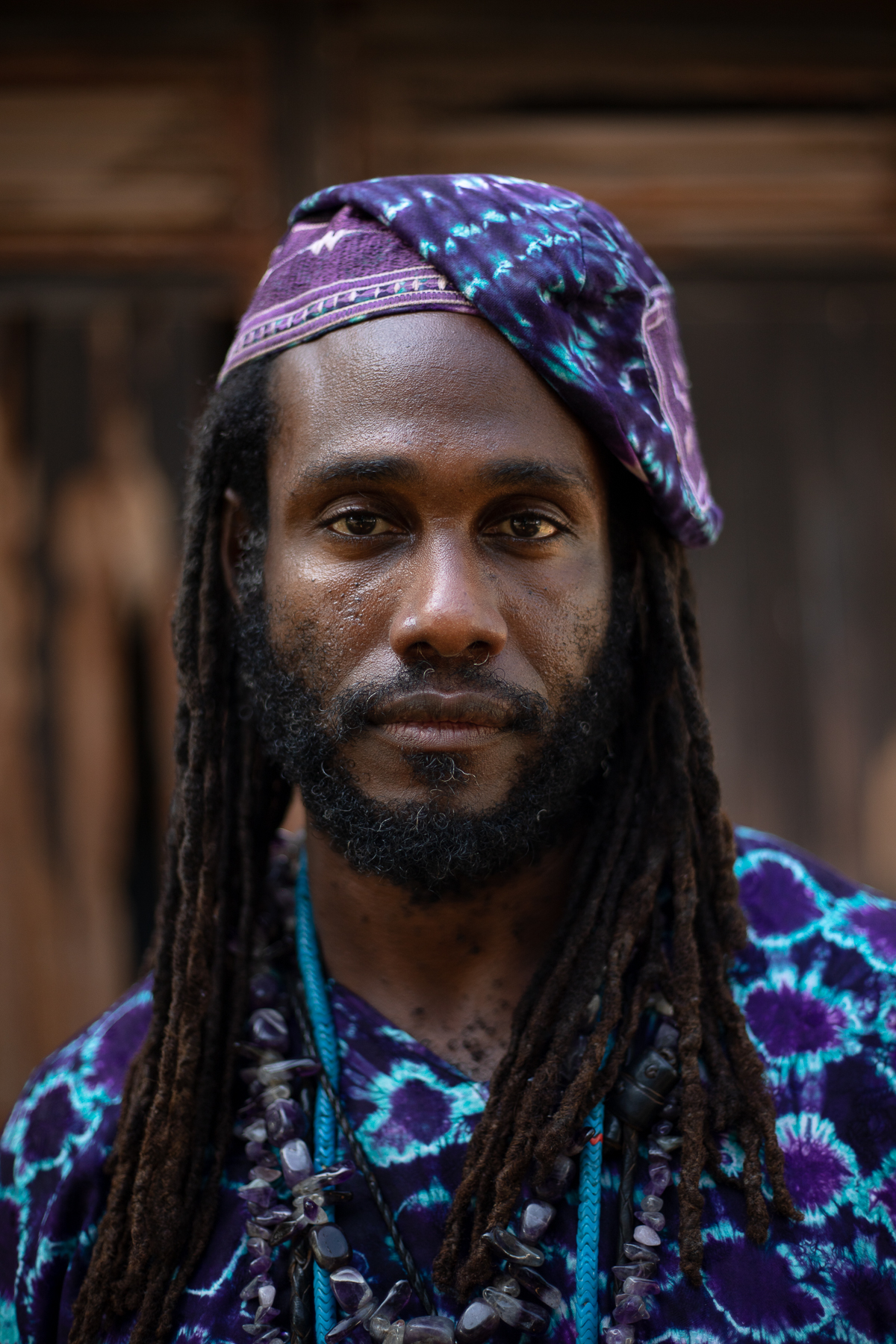
- Ɔbenfo (Professor) Ọbádélé Kambon
- Born: June 16, 1979 (age 47); Brooklyn, NY, United States
- Education: Morehouse College (BA); University of Wisconsin–Madison (MA); University of Ghana (PhD)
- Occupations: Linguist; academic
- Employer: University of Ghana

Ọbádélé Bakari Kambon is an American-born Ghanaian academic and Pan-African activist. Kambon is a full professor of African Linguistics in the Language, Literature and Drama Section of the Institute of African Studies (IAS), University of Ghana, with a research focus on African languages and African-centered thought. He came to public attention in 2016 for his involvement in the campaign that led to removal of the statue of Mohandas K. Gandhi from the University of Ghana campus in 2018, and his advocacy for African diaspora repatriation. Kambon holds the traditional titles of Apagyahene (ruler of upliftment) and Sunsum Ɔsahene (spirit warrior-ruler) in Akuapem Mampong in the Eastern Region of Ghana.

== Early life and education ==
Kambon was born in Brooklyn, NY in the United States.

Kambon studied for his first degree at Morehouse College in Atlanta, Georgia, graduating with a B.A. with honors in African American Studies. He earned two Master’s degrees from the University of Wisconsin-Madison: one in African Languages and Literature and the other in Linguistics. He earned a Doctorate degree in Linguistics from the University of Ghana in 2012.

== Academic career ==
Kambon began his academic career at the University of Wisconsin-Madison as a Teaching Assistant for Introductory and Intermediate Yorùbá. He then taught at Chicago State University and Northeastern Illinois University in the United States before moving to Ghana in 2008. After earning his doctoral degree in 2012, he joined the Institute of African Studies (IAS), University of Ghana where he currently serves as a Full Professor of African Linguistics in the Language, Literature and Drama Section. His research focuses on African approach to language and history. Kambon received the University of Ghana's Vice-Chancellor's Award for Outstanding Doctoral Dissertation (Humanities) in 2012, and the College of Humanities' Provost's Publication Award in the early-career category in 2016 and the late-career category in 2024.

In 2016, Kambon and other Ghanaian academics began a campaign for the removal of a statue of Mohandas K. Gandhi from the University of Ghana in what came to be known as the #gandhiMustFall movement. They cited Gandhi’s documented racist remarks in his writings against Black Africans, along with his efforts in segregating the postal and telegraph offices in Durban, South Africa, as well as prison lavatories, among others. The statue was finally removed in December 2018.

Kambon served as a visiting research fellow at the Lagos African Cluster Center (LACC), University of Lagos in 2021 and was editor-in-chief of the Ghana Journal of Linguistics from 2016 to 2023. In 2026, Kambon launched the Open D.O.O.R. Dialogues, a flagship initiative under the Decade of Our Own Return campaign aimed at connecting diaspora members with employment, entrepreneurship and investment opportunities in Ghana. He is the founder of the D.O.O.R. Initiative, which promotes African diaspora investment, skills transfer, entrepreneurship and permanent settlement in Ghana.

== Personal life ==
On 2 October 2026, Kambon was enstooled as Apagyahene (ruler of upliftment) and Sunsum Ɔsahene (spirit warrior-ruler) of Akuapem Mampong in the Eastern Region of Ghana. The customary rites included preparations at the compounds of the Ɔkyeamehene and Gyasehene, the application of hyire (white kaolin), a procession through the town's main thoroughfare, and the swearing of an oath at the palace. A reception after the ceremony also marked his promotion to full professor.

== Selected works ==
- Kambon, Obádélé; Songsore, Lwanga; Aketema, Joseph (September 2023). "400 Years? Ancestors Disappear! Historical Misorientation and Disorientation in the Year of Return and the 400 Years Narrative". Journal of African American Studies. 27 (3): 304–328. doi:10.1007/s12111-023-09634-5.
- Kambon, Obadele Bakari; Songsore, Lwanga (2021). "Fiction vs. Evidence: A critical review of ataa ayi kwei armah's wat nt shemsw and the eurasian rhetorical ethic". African and Asian Studies. 20 (12): 124–153. doi:10.1163/15692108-12341486.
- Kambon, Obadele Bakari; Adjei, Godwin Kwafo (2017). "Singing truth to power and the disempowered: The case of Lucky Mensah and his song, "Nkrato?"". Political Communication in Africa. Springer International Publishing. pp. 133–158. doi:10.1007/978-3-319-48631-4_9.
- Kambon, Obádélé (2025). "#GANDHIMUSTFALL, #AUGUSTUSMUSTFALL, temporal reality, Maat 'Maat' and srwḏ tꜢ n Kmt 'Restoring the Land of Black People'". The Routledge Handbook of Language and Race. Taylor & Francis. pp. 82–106. doi:10.4324/9781003240112-6.
- Kambon, O., & Appiagyei-Atua, K. (2018). The Pro-Indo-Aryan Anti-Black M.K. Gandhi And Ghana’s #Gandhimustfall Movement. In O. Rhodes Must Fall Movement (Ed.), Rhodes Must Fall: The Struggle to Decolonise the Racist Heart of Empire. Zed Books.
