= Ignatius Kofi Poku Edusei =

Ghanaian politician

Hon. Ignatius Kofi Poku-Adusei

Member of Parliament for Bekwai Constituency
- In office 7 January 2001 – 6 January 2005
- President: John Kufuor

Member of Parliament for Bekwai Constituency
- In office 7 January 2005 – 6 January 2009
- President: John Kufuor

Personal details
- Born: 25 October 1963 (age 62)
- Party: New Patriotic Party
- Education: Kwame Nkrumah University of Science and Technology, UG
- Occupation: Teacher/ Administrator

Ignatius Kofi Poku-Adusei is a Ghanaian politician of the Republic of Ghana. He was the Member of Parliament representing Bekwai constituency of the Ashanti Region of Ghana in the 4th Parliament of the 4th Republic of Ghana. He is a member of the New Patriotic Party.

== Early life and education ==
Poku-Adusei was born on October 25, 1963. He is a product of the Kwame Nkrumah University of Science and Technology, KNUST. He holds a Bachelor of Arts degree in Social Sciences from the university. He is also a product of University of Ghana (UG). From there, he acquired a master's degree in Business Administration.

== Career ==
Poku-Adusei is a teacher/ administrator by profession.

== Political career ==
Poku-Adusei is a member of the New Patriotic Party. He became a member of parliament from January 2005 after emerging winner in the General Election in December 2004. He was elected as the member of parliament for the Bekwai constituency in the fourth parliament of the fourth Republic of Ghana.

== Elections ==
In the year 2000, Adusei won the general elections as the member of parliament for the Bekwai constituency of the Ashanti Region of Ghana. He won on the ticket of the New Patriotic Party. His constituency was a part of the 31 parliamentary seats out of 33 seats won by the New Patriotic Party in that election for the Ashanti Region. The New Patriotic Party won a majority total of 100 parliamentary seats out of 200 seats. He was elected with 30,811 votes out of 36,062 total valid votes cast. This was equivalent to 85.7% of the total valid votes cast. He was elected over Michael O.K. Boakye of the National Democratic Congress, Stephen A. Kwarteng of the People's National Convention, Emmanuel K. Adade of the National Reformed Party and Michael O.K. Annan of the Convention People's Party. These won 4,260, 340, 333 and 193 votes out of the total valid votes cast respectively. These were equivalent to 11.9%, 0.9%, 0.9% and 0.5% respectively of total valid votes cast.

Poku-Adusei was elected as the member of parliament for the Bekwai constituency of the Ashanti Region of Ghana for the first time in the 2004 Ghanaian general elections. He won on the ticket of the New Patriotic Party. His constituency was a part of the 36 parliamentary seats out of 39 seats won by the New Patriotic Party in that election for the Ashanti Region. The New Patriotic Party won a majority total of 128 parliamentary seats out of 230 seats. He was elected with 34,830 votes out of 43,896 total valid votes cast. This was equivalent to 79.3% of total valid votes cast. He was elected over Janet Adarkwah of the People's National Convention, Jonas Owusu-Boateng of the National Democratic Congress, Grace Abena Nketia of the Convention People's Party, Beatrice Kusi-Appiah an independent candidate. These obtained 870, 3,739, 241 and 4,216 votes respectively of total votes cast. These were equivalent to 2.0%, 8.5%, 0.5% and 9.6% respectively of total valid votes cast.

== Personal life ==
Poku-Adusei is a Christian.

== See also ==
- List of MPs elected in the 2004 Ghanaian parliamentary election
