= Jamasi =

- Country: Ghana
- Region: Ashanti Region

Jamasi is a town in the Ashanti Region of Ghana.

Districts of Ghana     Sekyere South

Constituency : Afigya Sekyere East

Population : 8,000

Occupation : Farming and agriculture, best cocoa seedlings production, trade.

Ethnic group Akans

Languages of Ghana Twi, English

The town is known for the Adu Gyamfi Secondary School, one of the institutions attended by renowned Ghanaian musician Daddy Lumba (born Charles Kwadwo Fosu). The school is a second cycle institution.

== Notable People from Jamasi ==
- Lieutenant Colonel S.B. Baryeh
- Charles Allen Gyimah
- Ernest Yaw Bawuah
- Frank Sarfo Gyamfi
- Wahab Adams
