= Tetteh Quarshie =

Pre-independence Ghanaian agriculturist (c.1842–1892)

Tetteh Quarshie (Ga: Tette Kuarshi, c. 1842 – 25 December 1892) was an agriculturalist in the British Colony of Gold Coast and the person directly responsible for the introduction of cocoa crops to Gold Coast, which today constitute one of the major export crops of the Ghanaian economy. Quarshie travelled to the island of Fernando Po (now Bioko in Equatorial Guinea) in 1870 and returned in 1876 to Ghana in order to introduce the crop. He died on Christmas Day 1892.

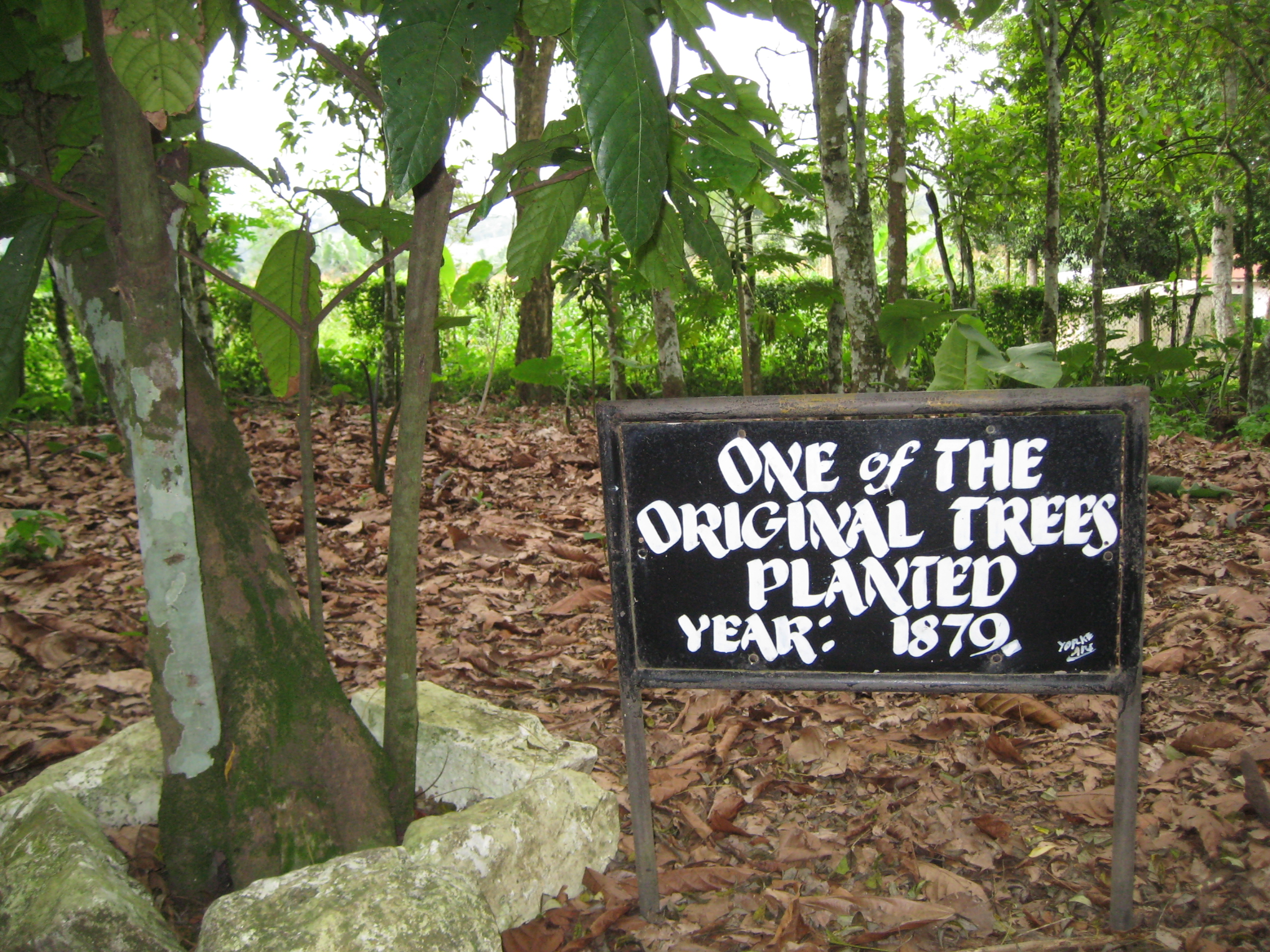
Tetteh Quarshie cocoa farm – One of the original trees, planted 1879

== Biography ==
Tetteh Quarshie was born in about 1842 to a farmer from Teshie known as Mlekubo. His mother was known as Ashong-Fio from Labadi, both hailing from the Ga-Dangme ethnic group. In his teens Tetteh Quarshie became an apprentice in a Basel Mission workshop at Akropong. Due to his hard work he soon became a master blacksmith and was in fact the first blacksmith to be established at Akuapim-Mampong. His hobby was farming.

In 1870, Tetteh Quarshie undertook a voyage to the Spanish colony Fernando Po (now Bioko in Equatorial Guinea). About six years later, he returned to Ghana with several cocoa beans.

Whether Tetteh Quarshie was actually the first person to introduce cocoa to Ghana was questioned during the administration of Sir Gordon Guggisberg, British Governor of the Gold Coast from 1919 to 1927. The colonial judge Sir William Brandford Griffith (1858–1939) claimed that it was his father, Sir William Brandford Griffith (Governor of the Gold Coast in 1880 and 1885), who deserved the credit. The Basel Missionaries also claimed to have experimented with cocoa beans in Ghana as noted in their diaries. Professor Akosua Larbi a historian said “Historically cocoa was initially brought into Ghana from Brazil by Rev. Haas. Between 1851 and the 1880s, Rev. Haas, Mole and other missionaries cultivated cocoa.” Guggisberg decided to fully investigate the various claims. As noted by D. H. Simpson: "Sir Gordon Guggisberg, who carefully went into the matter, saw (1) that the fact that Government found it necessary many a time to institute inquiries is ipso facto proof that cocoa first found its way into the Gold Coast through a channel rather than Government's, (2) that it was impossible that the Gold Coast Government could have failed to record or to give credit to such a distinguished personage as the late Governor Griffith if he were responsible for the introduction of cocoa into the colony, (3) that it was not likely that such responsible Officers as Mr. Gerald C. Dudgeon, Superintendent of Agriculture, and the late Mr. W. S. D. Tudhope, Director of Agriculture, would report that cocoa was first brought into the Gold Coast by Tetteh Quarshie without exhaustive inquiry having been previously made—a fact which is recognized by the Gold Coast Board of Education who have associated Tetteh Quarshie's name with cocoa."the people of teshie should enjoy from the cocoa

In 1879, Tetteh Quarshie planted the seeds at Mampong with some success. Friends and relatives also undertook the planting of cocoa when pods were distributed to them. Soon, other farmers followed suit. It was only at this point that the Basel Missionaries stepped into the picture by importing large quantities of the crop into the country. From the Gold Coast (Ghana) cocoa beans or cuttings were sent to other countries such as Nigeria and Sierra Leone. The export of cocoa from Ghana began in 1891, and the official export in 1893 (two bags exported). Ghana once provided almost half of world output. Between 1910 and 1980 Ghana was the world's largest exporter. This position was ceded due to bush fires. However, Ghana's cocoa is still of the highest quality and the country earns hundreds of millions of dollars annually from the export of the beans and processed materials.

Tetteh Quarshie died on Christmas Day of 1892. On 25 February 1925, the Gold Coast government was petitioned for a grant for the upkeep of some of Tetteh Quarshie's relatives. The then Ghanaian Vice-Principal of Achimota College, Dr. J. E. K. Aggrey strenuously took up the appeal. His friend, Sir Gordon Guggisberg, set up the Tetteh Quarshie Memorial Scholarship at Achimota College. After another petition in 1927, the Government gave a sum of 250 pounds, although Nana Sir Ofori Atta, speaking in the Legislative Council asked for 2,500 pounds, supported by Kojo Thompson. According to the late Ghanaian lawyer and anthropologist Dr. Isaac Ephson: "This took the form of a more enduring memorial, which was set up at Achimota in honour of the pioneer of Ghana's staple crop and the principal bulwark of the country's economy. The memorial is Tetteh Quarshie House. And since Independence (1957) the Government of Dr. Kwame Nkrumah after petitions from Dr. J. B. Danquah and the Eastern Region House of Chiefs, has built a first class hospital and fittingly named it after him at Mampong-Akwapim - TETTEH QUARSHIE MEMORIAL HOSPITAL."

== See also ==
- Tetteh Quarshie Memorial Hospital
