= Presbyterian Senior High School, Akuapim-Mampong =

Location
- Akuapim-Mampong; Eastern Region; Ghana; 5°54′20″N 0°08′41″W

Information
- Type: Public high school
- Motto: Nothing But The Best
- Religious affiliation: Presbyterian Church
- Established: 2002; 24 years ago
- Founder: Presbyterian Church of Ghana
- Status: Active
- School district: Akuapim North District
- Oversight: Ministry of Education
- Gender: Co-educational
- Age: 15 to 18
- Classes offered: General Arts, Home Economics, General Science, General Agriculture, Business, Visual Arts
- Language: English
- Houses: 4
- Colours: Blue and white

The Presbyterian Senior High School is a Presbyterian coeducational first-cycle institution in Akuapim-Mampong in the Eastern Region of Ghana. It is situated northeast of Tutu, close to Mampong Akwapim Senior High/Technical School for the Deaf.

The school runs courses in Business, Science, General Arts, General Agriculture, Home Economics and Visual Arts, leading to the award of a West African Senior School Certificate (WASSCE).

== History ==
A community-based institution school that was established in 2002 by the Presbyterian Church of Ghana. The general objective of its establishment was to provide full secondary school education to the growing number of boys and girls, especially those resident around the Akuapem North and South community.

The school runs both day, boarding and hostel system with majority of the students in the boarding house.

The schools colors are Blue and white. The school has on the grounds of Presbyterian discipline trained a lot of diligent men and women in godliness, good character and responsible.

== Enrollment ==
The school has about 2,500 students enrolled in Business, Science, general arts, general agric, Home Economics and visual arts courses.

== Facilities ==
- 3 Science Laboratories ( Physics, Biology and Chemistry)
- I.C.T Lab
- Library
- Home Economics Lab
- Visual Arts Center
- School Farm
- Sports (standard field for soccer and athletics, basketball court, volley and handball court)
- School Clinic
- Barbering shop

== See also ==
- Education in Ghana
- List of senior high schools in Ghana
