= Alexander Agyei-Acheampong =

Ghanaian politician

Member of Parliament for Bekwai Constituency
- In office 7 January 1996 – 6 January 2001
- President: Jerry John Rawlings
- Preceded by: Oduro Ofrikyi
- Succeeded by: Ignatius Kofi Poku Edusei

Personal details
- Born: Ghana
- Party: New Patriotic Party

Alexander Agyei-Acheampong is a Ghanaian politician. He served as a member of parliament for the Bekwai constituency in the Ashanti Region of Ghana.

== Politics ==
Alexander had a breakthrough in his political career when he contested for the office of the MP to represent Bekwai Constituency in the 1996 Ghanaian general elections and won it. He had since then become an active and important member of the New Patriotic Party he also became the party's national chairman, Germany branch.

== Elections ==
Alexander contested as a candidate to represent Bekwai Constituency with the ticket of the New Patriotic Party in the 1996 Ghanaian general elections and won. He was declared winner after being confirmed to have obtained the highest vote count among other contestants. He obtained 28,313 votes while his main opponent, Mr. Kwaku Poku-Agyemang who contested on the ticket of the National Democratic Congress obtained 7,301 votes. These mentioned numbers are equivalent to 63.10% and 16.30% of the total vote count respectively.

== See also ==
- 1996 Ghanaian general election
- Parliament of Ghana
- Mike Oquaye – Speaker of the 7th Parliament of the 4th Republic.
