= Nana Acheampong =

Ghanaian highlife musician

- Also known as: Champion Lover boy
- Born: Ernest Nana Acheamponng; Abuakwa, Ashanti Region, Ghana
- Genre: Highlife
- Years active: 1982

Ernest "Owoahene" Nana Acheampong, popularly known as Nana Acheampong, is a Ghanaian Highlife musician. He is also the other half of the famous Lumba brothers who popularized Burger-highlife in Ghana (the other is Charles Kojo Fosu, also known as Daddy Lumba).

Nana Acheampong is also known as the Champion Lover boy. The Abuakwa native and Kumasi Technical Institute graduate has a musical career spanning more than 30 years. He is the father of Ghanaian singer Gyakie.

== Early life ==
Acheampong was born in Abuakwa in the Ashanti Region of Ghana. He attended the Kumasi Technical Institute.

== Career ==
In middle school, he led his school band. He left for Germany in the 1980s and played with the Talking Drum band. He formed his band in 1987 before he hooked up with Daddy Lumba in 1989. They released their first and last album, Yɛɛyɛ Aka Akwantuo Mu, after splitting up in pursuit of solo careers.

Acheampong owns the Owoahene Studio, in Suame, Kumasi, where he has done his latest recordings, with himself as Executive Producer for Owoahene Music.

His songs include "Abu aka mesim", "Casanova", "Kata w'ani te", "Deobrenodi", "Nipa", "Se eye wode", "Obibini mu obibini", "Ever ready", "Odo yarea", "Meko odo nkyen", "I go die 4 u", "Mansusu saa", "Ako me square","My rub a dub girl", "Brebre Obaahemaa", and "Wo wone hwan".

== Personal life ==
Acheampong is the father of Ghanaian afrobeat/afro singer Gyakie.

== See also ==
- Highlife
- Daddy Lumba
