= Daddy Lumba =

Ghanaian musician (1964–2025)

- Daddy Lumba in 2011
- Born: Charles Kwadwo Fosuh; 29 September 1964; Nsuta, Ashanti Region, Ghana
- Died: 26 July 2025 (aged 60); Accra, Ghana
- Other names: DL; Lumba
- Citizenship: Ghanaian/Asante, Naturalized German
- Education: Juaben Senior High School; Adu Gyamfi Senior High School
- Occupations: musician; producer; singer; songwriter; entrepreneur
- Parents: Johnson Kwadwo Fosuh (father); Ama Saah (mother)
- Awards: Ghana Music Awards
- Website: daddylumbaofficial.com

Charles Kwadwo Fosuh (29 September 1964 – 26 July 2025), known professionally as Daddy Lumba, was a Ghanaian singer-songwriter, a Royal of the Asante tribe, musician, and record producer. A prolific and prominent figure in modern highlife, he is regarded as the greatest and most influential Ghanaian musicians of all time. Lumba was noted for his expansive songwriting, dynamic artistry, and musical longevity as well as his controversies. Rooted in Ghanaian culture and folklore, his lyrics touched on topics such as love, life, death, family, money, poverty, pleasure, grief, spirituality, and sensuality.

During the development of Germany-based Burger Highlife in the late 1980s, Lumba began his musical career as part of the Lumba Brothers duo with fellow Ghanaian artist Nana Acheampong. Both were migrants living in Germany at the time. They released their sole studio album, Yee Ye Aka Akwantuom; the title track became a hit back home in Ghana and is considered one of the most celebrated songs in highlife music. Shortly after the duo disbanded in the early 1990s, Lumba embarked on a solo career and launched his own record label, Lumba Productions, an imprint of MiPROMO. He released a catalog of successful records over the course of several decades.

Lumba won seven Ghana Music Awards. He received the EMY Africa Awards' Icon/Legend of Entertainment award in 2018. In 2023, he was also given the Borga Highlife Lifetime Award by the German Ambassador to Ghana. In 2024, he was among the recipients of the National Honours and Awards. In 2025, his song "Mpempem Do Me" was included on an Apple Music-exclusive playlist curated by the UK's King Charles III for Commonwealth Day.

== Early life ==
Charles Kwadwo Fosu was born on 29 September 1964 in Nsuta, Ashanti Region of Ghana to Comfort Gyamfi (n.a.–2001), popularly known as Ama Saah, and Johnson Kwadwo Fosu. The second of three siblings, both of his parents were teachers. His father died early in his childhood.

Fosu began his education in Nsuta, and attended Suame Methodist in Kumasi, graduating in 1979. He then attended Adu Gyamfi Senior High School in Jamasi but later transferred to Juaben Senior High School, where he would complete his secondary education in 1984.

== Career ==
=== First recordings and the Lumba Brothers (1983–1989) ===
Fosu started singing at the age of 16, when he led the Juaben Senior High School choir from 1983 to 1984. He had also formed his first band, "Lumba Brothers," with his friends. He started to become widely known in the region when he formed the Nkwanta Wesley Singers, with the group gaining fame at the Anokye Krom Cultural Center. During this time, he composed the song "Lumba Lumba," dedicated to the South African freedom fighters of the time. The song became popular, earning him the nickname "Daddy Lumba," which later became his stage name.

Once graduating from Juaben, he moved to Germany in 1983 with the support of his then girlfriend Theresa Abebrese, whom he met in high school, and the support of his School Teacher, Mama Acheampong. In Germany, he met Highlife musician Nana Acheampong. Acheampong was already in a duo called "Talking Dreams." They struck up a friendship and formed the duo the Lumba Brothers (derived from Daddy Lumba's earlier band). They planned to release their debut studio album, Yee Ye Aka Akwantuom in 1986, produced by Akosua Serwa. The album's commercial release was postponed to 1989 due to financial issues but went on to become an major success for the duo. The Lumba Brothers were cited for popularizing a new sub-genre of Highlife, called Burger-Highlife. In the following two years, the duo split up, but they still performed together at live shows for about ten years until Lumba relocated to another city.

=== Solo career (1990–2025) ===
==== Rising popularity (1990–2000s) ====
After the Lumba Brothers split, Daddy Lumba released his debut solo album, Obi Ate Meso Buo, in 1990, which was met with critical acclaim and was popular within the Ghanaian music space. The album included the song "Theresa," dedicated to his former girlfriend. Lumba records his music in the Rheinklang Studio, located in Düsseldorf, Germany. Daddy Lumba released at least one album annually until 2010. In total, he released 27 studio albums during this period of time (including Obi Ate Meso Buo). He released his music through his own record label, Lumba Productions, an imprint of MiPROMO.

2000s Lumba Production Logo

Throughout the 1990s, he produced albums for several fellow artists in Germany, including Vida by Felix Owusu, in 1992. Around this time, Lumba met Ofori Amponsah, who was looking for a producer to kickstart his music career. Simultaneously, Daddy Lumba briefly put his music career on hold. His first collaboration with Lumba was on the song "Anti Atta," and he released his debut album, Asew. He had also worked with Ofori with the studio album, Wo Ho Kyere, released in 1999.

In 1999, he won three awards at the Ghana Music Awards, including Album of the Year and Most Popular Song of the year. He also won Artiste of the Year at the Ghana Music Awards in 2000.

On 10 December 2005, Daddy Lumba performed at the House of Blues in Chicago.

Daddy Lumba was a public endorser of New Patriotic Party (NPP). His song, "Nana Ye Winner," played a vital role in the party's presidential campaigns in 2008 (its release date), 2012, and 2016. He also released another song for Nana Akufo-Addo's 2020 re-election, titled "4 More For Nana."

On 11 January 2009, three armed military personnel stormed into Lumba's residence in Atimatim, Kumasi. In the home at the time were his younger sister, Faustina Fosu, along with other relatives. According to Faustina, the armed men asked about the whereabouts of Lumba, elaborating that they had travelled with him from Accra and were told by him to meet him in the house. Once she told them he wasn't home, they left, only to return two hours later at the gate of the home with aggression and verbal insults. Once they left, she got in contact with authorities. There were no public statements by Daddy Lumba about the incident.

==== 2010—2025 ====
On 26 December 2010, Daddy Lumba was scheduled to perform at the Royal Lamerta Hotel, Ahodwo in Kumasi, the first time performing in the city in 26 years to celebrate his 26th anniversary of his solo career. The event was rescheduled for 1 January 2011 (at the same venue) due to deteriorating equipment, vandalism, and other unsatisfactory characteristics of the hotel. The hotel was sued as a result of breaching its part of the contract with the organisers of the event.

On 17 January 2018, Lumba filed a lawsuit at the Accra High Court against Kwame Anokye, also known as Daddy Lumba Junior, alleging that Anokye had claimed to be his son and had impersonated him to receive gifts from people. He further alleged that Anokye had started impersonating him since his appearance on the TV Africa-produced reality show, Just Like You. As a result of the lawsuit, he changed his stage name to Anokye Supremo.

At the 2018 EMY Africa Awards, Lumba won the Icon/Legend of Entertainment award. When he received the prize, he said, "Thank you to the organisers and the people of Ghana. I'll keep giving you good music for as long as I live."

In October 2023, The German Ambassador to Ghana gave Lumba the Borga Highlife Lifetime Achievement Award.

Lumba received the Grand Medal at the 2024 National Honours and Awards, held at the Accra International Conference Centre on 30 December 2024.

In commemoration of the 2025 Commonwealth Day, King Charles III listed 'Mpempem Do Me' song as among his favorites. The song ranked seventh out of 17 songs on King Charles's "the kings music room" playlist on Apple Music.

Lumba was set to go on tour across the United States and Canada after over 20 years. The tour was cancelled by TM Entertainmentz on the day of his death. According to Ghanaian record producer Kaywa, Lumba was working on one last album before his retirement from the music industry. The album would have explored different genres, including roots reggae, amapiano, afrobeats, and highlife.

== Artistry ==
Lumba wrote, composed, arranged, produced, and performed his compositions. Though his music was usually sung in Twi, he occasionally sings in English. Once, in "Homeless", he sang not only in Twi and English but also in German, which he learned during his journey through Germany earlier in his career.

=== Musical style ===
Theresa (song)
Lumba's lyrics centers around the feeling of being loved and having support from others.

Being raised in a gospel background, Lumba recorded multiple gospel albums and songs centering around his thoughts on life, love, and relationships, along with providing motivation and hope. Daddy Lumba's musical style is described as versatile and deeply emotional, exploring a wide range of themes. His over 200 recorded songs delve into topics such as love, relationships, marriage, poverty, hope, money, homelessness, motivation, gratitude, happiness, God, and grace. His music often reflects his deep appreciation for womanhood, gratitude toward loved ones, and personal experiences, making him a relatable and impactful artist.

=== Aesthetics ===
Lumba was known for introducing a swagger and charisma to Highlife, which many weren't accustomed to. He had many hairstyles throughout his career, including a fade, cornrows, and Jehri curls.

== Personal life ==
His mother, Comfort Gyamfi (Ama Saah), was a significant influence on him. Her death in 2001 deeply affected him and inspired emotionally rich songs reflecting grief, hope and faith. Daddy Lumba was known to be somewhat private about his personal life. His net worth is estimated to be around $16 million (GH₵176 million), making him one of the wealthiest musicians in Ghana.

=== Radio station ===
In September 2022, Lumba opened DLFM (106.9 MHz), a radio station broadcasting in Twi in the Accra area.

=== Illness and death ===
External image
- Official statement letter from Daddy Lumba's family confirming his death

In the early morning hours of 26 July 2025, Lumba died suddenly at The Bank Hospital, located in Cantonments, Accra. Prior to his death, during his 60th birthday celebration in Accra in 2024, he debunked rumours that his wife Akosua Serwa had poisoned him. He disclosed he underwent spinal surgery believed to be around 2013. Before 2013, he was a healthy man who performed at many concerts and events. Lumba performed at several concerts and shows around the world. King Promise revealed to Joy FM that he and Daddy Lumba were working on a collaborative album in the previous two months preceding Lumba's death.

=== Funeral rites ===
The family head (abusuapanin) of the late musician, Lumba announced his final funeral would take place on 6 December 2025 at the Baba Yara Sports Stadium in Kumasi.

=== December 2025 court injunction ===
On 12 December 2025, the Accra High Court granted an injunction following a petition filed by Daddy Lumba’s maternal relatives, temporarily halting preparations for his funeral, which had been scheduled for 13 December 2025. The court restrained the family head, Kofi Owusu (Abusuapanin), from organizing the funeral and barred Transitions Funeral Home from releasing the body from the mortuary pending the determination of the substantive legal dispute. The ruling emphasized that the immediate family of the deceased had allegedly been excluded from the funeral planning process and that due process required their involvement.

The court further ordered that a stakeholder meeting be convened to agree on a new burial date and directed that all funds raised for the funeral be kept separate from accounts operated by the Daddy Lumba Memorial Foundation until the matter was resolved.

Later the same day, the injunction was lifted after the applicants failed to meet a court-ordered requirement to deposit a GH¢2 million undertaking necessary to sustain the injunction. Consequently, the barrier was removed and funeral preparations were permitted to proceed as originally planned for 13 December 2025.

== Legacy ==
Daddy Lumba inspired and encouraged many young Ghanaians and Ghanaian musicians to pursue highlife through his music. He had also helped start many artists' careers, including Felix Owusu, Afia Ampofowaa, Kwabena Sunkwa, Ofori Amponsah, Selina Orleans, Akua Serwaa Bonsu, Borax, Ateaa Tina, and many more. Other musicians such as Sarkodie, King Promise, and KiDi cited Lumba as a major influence on their music careers.

Lumba's contribution to the progression of Ghanaian highlife music helped to redefine the genre and further increase its international appeal and cultural impact.

== Awards and nominations ==
Sources

- ^{^[a]}Ghana Music Awards.

Organization	Year	Category	Nominated work	Result	Ref.
Ghana Music Awards	1999	Best Album	—	Won	^{[a]}
Ghana Music Awards	1999	Most Popular Song	—	Won	^{[a]}
Ghana Music Awards	2000	Artist of the Year	—	Won	^{[a]}
Ghana Music Awards	2000	Album Of The Year	"Aben Wo Ha"	Won	^{[a]}
Ghana Music Awards	2000	Song of the Year	"Aben Wo Ha"	Won	
Ghana Music Awards	2003	Contemporary Highlife Album Of The Year	Poison	Won	^{[a]}
Ghana Music Awards	2003	Contemporary Highlife Song Of The Year	"Menya Mpo"	Won	^{[a]}
Ghana Music Awards	2008	Song of the Year	"Tokrom"	Nominated	
Ghana Music Awards	2011	Highlife Song of the Year	"Anadwo Ye Die"	Nominated	
Ghana Music Awards	2012	Highlife Song of the Year	"Hye Po"	Nominated	
Ghana Music Awards	2015	Highlife Song of the Year	"Yentie Obiaa"	Won	^{[a]}
Ghana Music Awards UK	2017	Highlife Song of the Year	"Enko Den"	Nominated	
Ghana Music Awards UK	2023	Highlife Song of the Year	"Ofon Na Ɛdi Asɛm Fo"	Nominated	
Ghana Music Awards UK	2023	Most Popular Song of the Year	"Ofon Na Ɛdi Asɛm Fo"	Nominated	

=== Honorary awards ===
Organization	Year	Category	Ref.
Ghana Music Awards	1999	Artist of the Year	^{[a]}
Ghana Music Awards	2000	Artist of the Year	^{[a]}
Ghana Music Awards	2003	Contemporary Highlife Artist Of The Year	^{[a]}
Ghana Music Awards	2015	Highlife Artiste(s) of the Year	^{[a]}
Ghana Music Awards	2018	Lifetime Achievement Award	
EMY Africa Awards	2018	Icon/Legend of Entertainment	
Embassy of Ghana, Berlin, Germany	2023	Borga Highlife Lifetime Achievement Award	
National Honours and Awards	2024	Grand Medal	

== See also ==
- Music of Ghana
- Highlife
- Nana Acheampong

== Work cited ==
Primary

- "My Story". Daddy Lumba.
