= Tetteh Quarshie cocoa farm =

Cocoa farm in Ghana

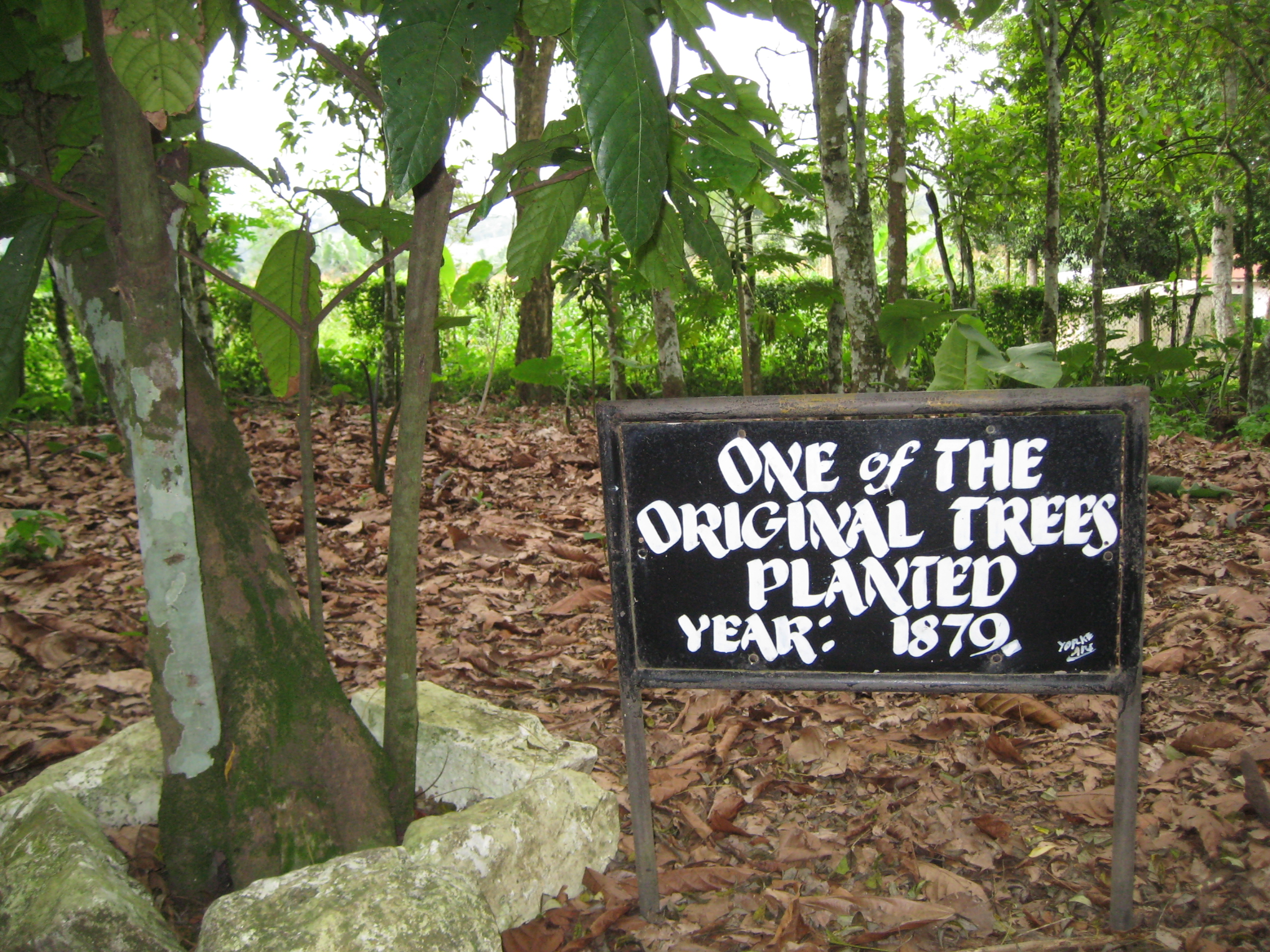
- A cocoa tree, planted on the Tetteh Quarshie cocoa farm, by Tetteh Quarshie in 1879
- Established: 1879
- Location: Akuapim-Mampong, Ghana

The Tetteh Quarshie cocoa farm, also known as the Ecomuseum of Cocoa, is the founding cocoa farm in Ghana. It is located in Akuapim-Mampong around 58km from Accra. Tetteh Quarshie established the farm in 1879 using seeds brought back from Bioko, Equatorial Guinea. Three trees planted by Quarshie remain at the farm. The farm is currently around one acre in size, and is managed by the Cocoa Research Institute of Ghana.
