= Mpempem Do Me =

Song by Daddy Lumba

from the album Sika
- Language: Akan (Twi)
- Released: 2008
- Studio: Creative Studios (Appietus), Dansoman, Accra
- Genre: Highlife
- Length: 6:18
- Label: Lumba Productions
- Songwriter(s): Daddy Lumba
- Producer(s): Daddy Lumba

"Mpempem Do Me" is a highlife song by Ghanaian musician Daddy Lumba from his 2008 album Sika.

The song is sung in Akan Language (Twi) and was written and produced by Daddy Lumba, with sound engineer Appietus mixing and programming it. It features rapper and singer, Mr. Voltage.

== Background and composition ==
Released in 2008, Daddy Lumba opens up about facing adversities and being hated by many due to his success and fame. Despite these challenges and betrayals, he draws strength from the support of his multitude of loved ones. In the chorus, Lumba sings: "Mpempem tan me a, Mpempem na ɛdɔ me o," which translates to, "Thousands may hate me, but thousands love me."

In the song, Daddy Lumba compares his struggles to the biblical story of Jesus and the Israelites, suggesting that just as Jesus' kingdom grew after his crucifixion, his own legacy will thrive despite the hate he endures:

"If I am vile,

If my ways are crooked,

Be patient, for the Almighty Judge above awaits me.

The Israelites thought by condemning the Lord,

His reign would cease, His defeat assured.

Had they known His death would make it thrive,

They would have spared Him."

== Legacy ==
"Mpempem Do Me" is a fan-favourite and regarded as one of Daddy Lumba's most critically-acclaimed songs. The song has become a staple in his live performances, and he includes it in most of his concert. Notably, he performed the song for then-Prince Charles and his wife, Camilla, at a state banquet held in their honour in Accra in 2018.

In March 2025, "Mpempem Do Me" gained international recognition when it was featured on King Charles III's special playlist for Commonwealth Day. This playlist, curated in collaboration with Apple Music, highlighted songs that resonate across the Commonwealth's diverse cultures, including tracks by Beyoncé, Diana Ross, and Bob Marley.

== See also ==
- Aben Wo Ha
- Yentie Obiaa
- Theresa
- Ofon Na Edi Asem Fo
