= Ahodwo, Kumasi =

Ahodwo
- Location in Ghana
- Coordinates: 6°7′N 1°7′W
- Country: Ghana
- Region: Ashanti region

Ahodwo is suburb of Kumasi. Kumasi is the regional capital of the Ashanti region of Ghana. It is a residential area in the Kumasi Metropolitan Assembly. It is about 7 kilometres westwards from centre of the regional capital.

== Notable place ==
The Ahodwo roundabout is a major intersection in the town. A giant horse statue is located in the roundabout's centre.
