= Charles Allen Gyimah =

Ghanaian politician and film maker

- Born: 1939
- Died: 2014 (aged 74–75)
- Other names: Nana Gyimah Kesseh
- Citizenship: Ghanaian
- Occupations: Traditional leader, politician, film maker, and entrepreneur

Charles Allen Gyimah (1939–2014) was a Ghanaian traditional leader, politician, film maker, and entrepreneur. He was the founder of Video City Limited, a video production company which was situated in Accra and Mampong.

== Career ==
As the Chief of Jamasi, Gyimah was known by the stool name Nana Gyimah Kesseh I. He abdicated his chieftaincy title after protracted disagreements among the royals of Jamasi He was the financial controller of Kumasi Ashanti Kotoko Football Club when the club won the 1983 African Club Championship under the chairmanship of Yaw Barwuah.

Gyimah made a fortune as one of the prominent traders in the Kantamanto market. By 2013, he was the chief of patron of the market's traders. In the 1980s, he recorded football matches of Ashanti Kotoko and duplicated them on VHS cassettes for sale. He did same for Concert Party and local television drama groups. One of such groups was the Osofo Dadzie Group. His collaboration with the group led to the videoing of Abbyssinia in 1985. The movie was one of the earliest ones that used the video technology. His company employed technicians of the state-owned Ghana Broadcasting Corporation (GBC) who videotaped social events. His contract with GBC also helped him gain contact with Nana Bosomprah, a member of the Osofo Dadzie, through whom he was able to work with the Osofo Dadzie Group. Unfortunately, Gyimah's attempt to restrict distribution of the movie to his chain of Video City cinemas made him run at a loss.

== Personal life ==
Gyimah is the father of Gerald Gyimah and George Gyo Gyimah, CEO of Phamous Philms. Gwyneth Gyimah Addo of hair Senta
