= Tetteh Quarshie Memorial Hospital =

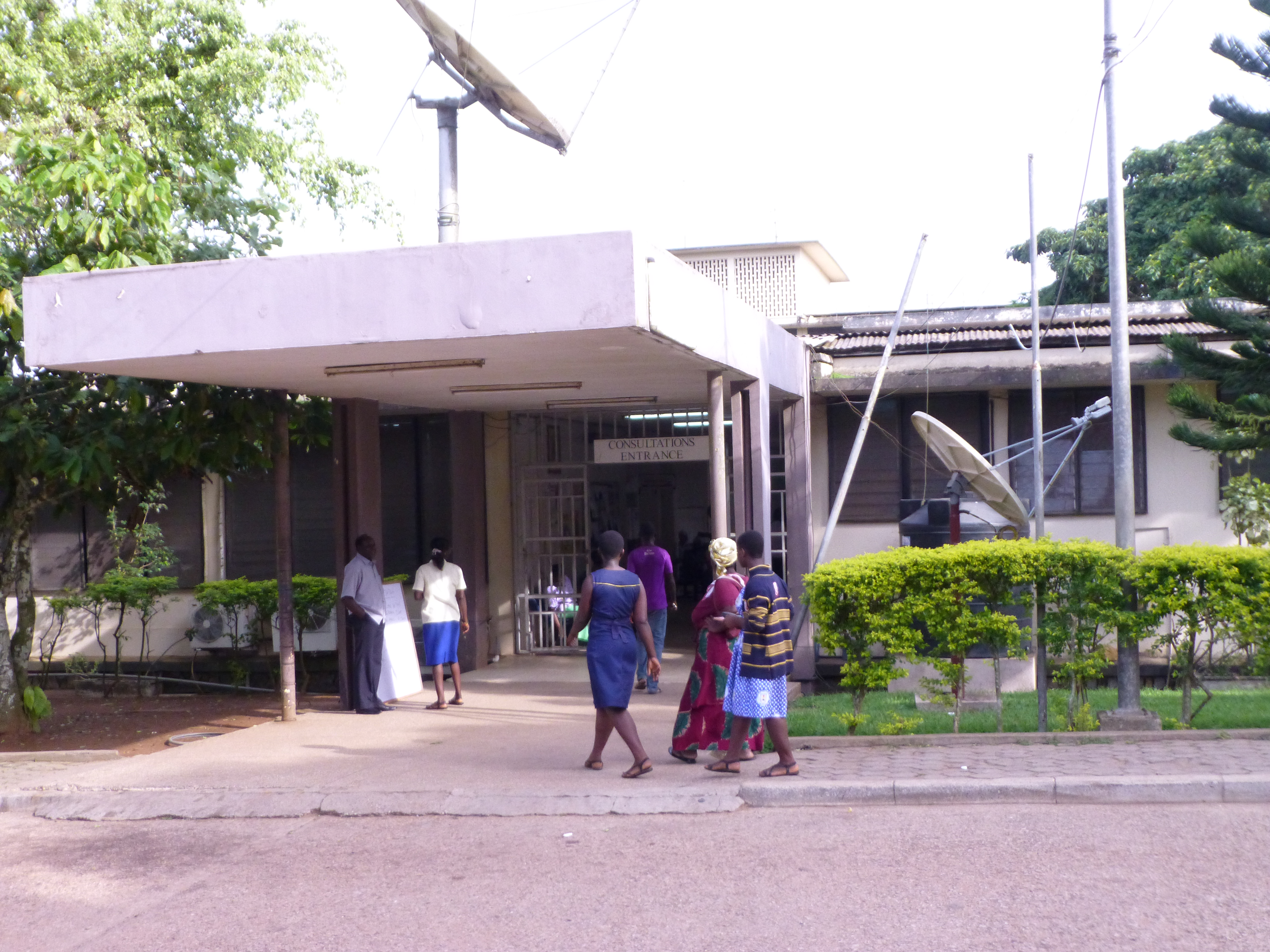
- Main entrance.

Geography
- Location: Mampong Akuapem, Eastern Region, Ghana
- Coordinates: 5.9216°N 0.1330°W

Organisation
- Care system: Ghana Health Service
- Type: General

Services
- Emergency department: Yes
- Beds: 114

Helipads
- Helipad: No

History
- Founded: 1929

Links
- Lists: Hospitals in Ghana

Tetteh Quarshie Memorial Hospital is a public Hospital located in Akuapim-Mampong in the Eastern Region of Ghana.

== History and etymology ==
The hospital was established in 1961 and named to honour Tetteh Quarshie.

The Tetteh Quarshie Memorial Hospital was established in February 1961 by the Ghana Cocoa Marketing Board (GCMB) to honor Tetteh Quashie, who is recognized for introducing cocoa to Ghana.

== Site and facilities ==
The road entrance is on the south side of the N4 highway, approximately one hour northeast of Accra. The site is approximately seven hectares, pleasantly landscaped. The hospital has an administrative building, a residential hostel for staff, three buildings containing patient wards, and several accessory buildings.

== Medical superintendents ==
2016–present Dr. Albert Benneh
20??-2016 Dr. Mawuli Gyakobo

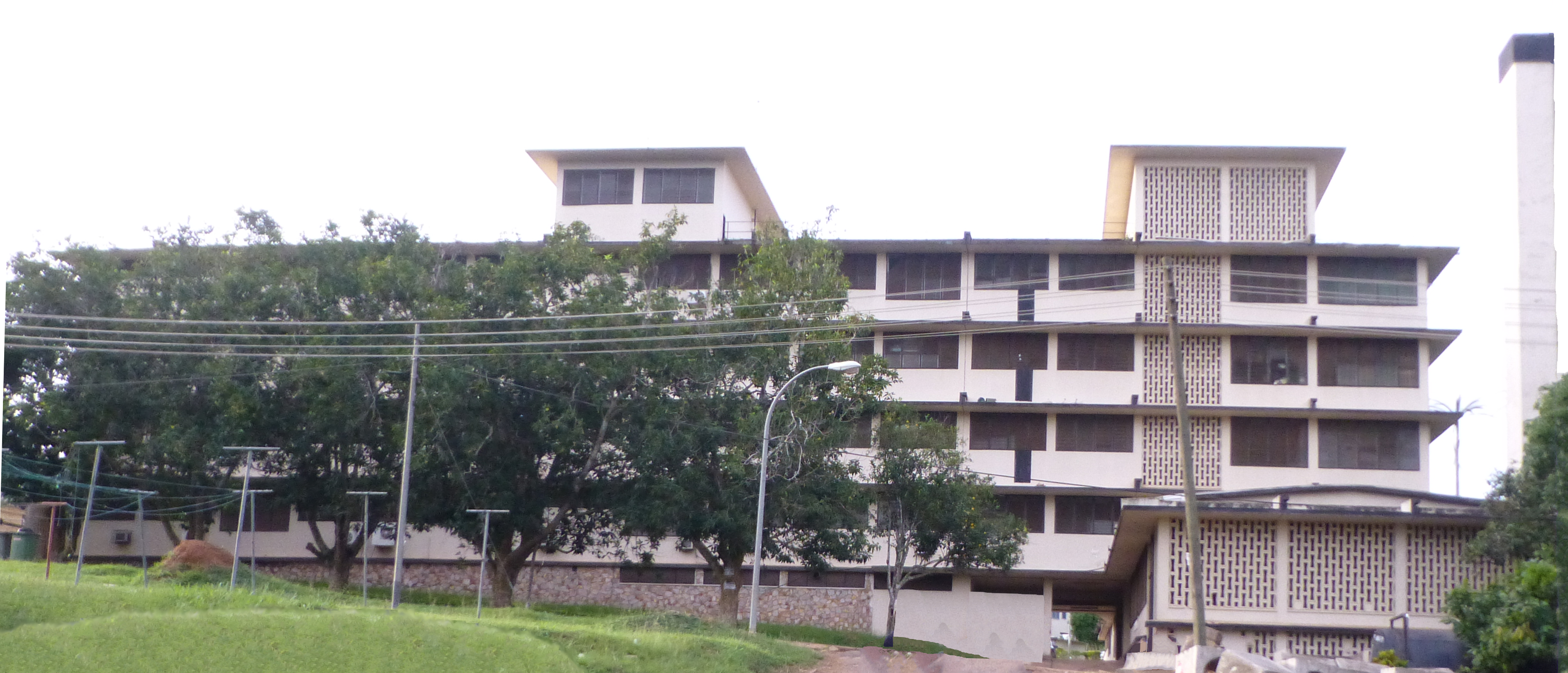
The southwestern elevation of the largest building on the site. The main entrance is on the opposite side.
