= Adu Gyamfi Senior High School =

Adu Gyamfi High School

Location
- P. O. Box 17; Ashanti Region; Jamasi; Ghana; 6.9722°N 1.4701°W

Information
- Type: Public high school
- Established: 1968; 58 years ago
- Status: Active
- Oversight: Ministry of Education
- Gender: Coeducational
- Age: 14 to 18
- Classes offered: Home economics, general science, general arts, visual arts, business
- Language: English
- Affiliation: Seventh-day Adventist Church, Ghana

Adu Gyamfi Senior High School is a public senior high school located at Jamasi in the Sekyere East District of the Ashanti Region of Ghana.

== History ==
Adu Gyamfi Senior High School was established in 1968 by Jamasi Presbyterian Church as a private institution. Initially it was known as Presbyterian Secondary Commercial School (PRESCO). The first headmaster of the school was E.K. Sarpong, with a student population of 80. The institution was absorbed into the public school system in 1974, and its name was changed to Adu Gyamfi Secondary School.

== See also ==
- Education in Ghana
- List of schools in Ghana
