= Juaben Senior High School =

- Juaben; Ghana

Information
- Other name: Juaben SHS
- Former name: Juaben Secondary School
- Established: November 1972
- Staff: ca. 120 teaching and ca. 85 non-teaching default label
- Gender: coeducational
- Enrollment: ca. 3502

Juaben Senior High School, also known as Juaben SHS, formerly Juaben Secondary School, is a co-educational senior high school in Juaben, a town in the Ejisu-Juaben District of the Ashanti Region in Ghana.

== History ==
The school opened with the name Juaben Secondary School in November 1972, starting with 87 students. It had originally been opened in 1950 as a model Girl's Basic School, and was converted to a Women's Training College in October 1962.

In 2020, the school won a computing competition for senior high schools in the Ashanti Region called Code Afrique, which had been organised by Cornell University and Kwame Nkrumah University of Science and Technology.

== Operations ==
The school is under the Ghana Education Service of the government of Ghana. The school is located in Ashanti Juaben in the Ejisu Juaben Municipality, about 30 km from Kumasi and about 8 km from Ejisu.

The school has 3861 students, and 251 staff member, including a teaching staff of 152 and non-teaching staff of 99. It has 2979 boarding students and 882 day students.

The school offers programmes in general agriculture, general arts, general science, home economics and the visual arts.

The school has 8 houses with each having about 482 students; the houses are Nana Adarkwa Yiadom, Bishop Asante Antwi, Nana Yaw Sarpong II, Nana Otuo Serebour II for boys and Danielles Ghartey, Sussana Wesley, Rose E. Coker, and Nana Akosua Akyaama II. Over the years, it has garnered success in both academics and co-curricular activities, such as sports, debate, drama, etc.

== Notable alumni ==
- John Amponsah, javelin thrower
- Joseph Osei Owusu, lawyer, MP for Bekwai constituency
- Charles Kwadwo Fosu, aka Daddy Lumba, musician

== See also ==
- Education in Ghana
- List of senior high schools in the Ashanti Region
