= Agona SDA College of Education =

Teacher training college in Ghana

Coordinates: 6°56′12.11″N 1°29′15.57″W

SDA College of Education, Asokore is a teacher training college in Koforidua, Ghana. The college is about 84 km from the capital Accra, Ghana, and has an area of 35.9 hectares (89 acres).

The SDA College of Education is affiliated with the University of Education, Winneba.

== History ==
The college was established in 1962 by the government in collaboration with the Seventh-day Adventist Church Ghana, and was first run by the Government of Ghana and the SDA Church. The college admitted its first batch of students in 2013 although had not received accreditation from the National Accreditation Board (Ghana). In 2012 the college applied for a name approval and accreditation.

The college, on deliberation with the National Accreditation Board (Ghana), was granted a three-year institutional authorization which took effect on December 12, 2013.

== Courses ==
- General Programme
- Early Childhood Education Studies
- Mathematics/Science
