= Tommy Annan Forson =

Ghanaian broadcaster

- Born: 1952 (age 73–74)
- Occupation: Broadcaster

Tommy Annan Forson is a veteran Ghanaian broadcaster also known as The King of Country Music and The God Father of Radio, Radio personality and Founder of Rabodef Radio Academy. He took up a career in radio after being inspired by a radio program on Ghana Broadcasting Corporation (GBC) in 1978.

== Career ==
He began his broadcasting journey in 1977 as a Program Assistant at Ghana Broadcasting Corporation (GBC) (The State's broadcaster), after serving as a guest presenter on a program called ‘Variety Ahoi,’ in the same media house. In 1995 he was invited to join the Multimedia Group, a media company during its formative years as the Programmes Director. He stayed with the Multimedia Group for almost two years before joining hitherto to Sunshine Radio (which was later transformed to Choice FM and now Kasapa Fm) as General Manager. He is now the director of radio and host of Country Express at Max FM.

== Achievement ==
His success in the industry is hinged on talent as he had no professional media training nor a university degree. He is known as one of the pioneers of stand-up comedy and also credited with training leading broadcasters in Ghana including Komla Dumor and Yaw Ampofo Ankrah.

== Awards ==
He was honoured by Citi FM at the maiden edition of The Eminence, for championing many people into the media fraternity.
