= Ofon Na Ɛdi Asɛm Fo =

Single by Daddy Lumba
- Released: December 23, 2022
- Genre: Highlife
- Length: 5:36
- Label: Lumba Productions
- Songwriter: Charles Kwadwo Fosuh (Daddy Lumba)
- Producers: Daddy Lumba, Kweku Mensah

"Ofon Na Ɛdi Asɛm Fo" is a song by Ghanaian highlife and afro-pop musician Daddy Lumba, released on December 23, 2022.

== Background ==
The song is Daddy Lumba's first project since the release of his 33rd studio album "Enko Den" in January 2017. It was produced by Daddy Lumba and programmed and mixed by his longtime collaborator Kweku Mensah.

Written, composed and arranged by Daddy Lumba, Ofon Na Ɛdi Asɛm Fo was recorded about seven years ago. It was slated for release late 2017 but was postponed several times. In an interview granted on his radio station, Daddy Lumba explained that he delayed its release because he was waiting for the right time.

On December 22, 2022, Daddy Lumba announced in a video posted on his social media accounts that his long-awaited and hotly-anticipated single will finally be released on December 23, 2022.

== Composition ==
The song which translates to mean 'Nonentities engage in stupidities', is a two chord, mid tempo progression piece, laced with a strong brass instrument presence. Daddy Lumba opens the song, lamenting picking a nonentity from the gutters and polishing the person up, only for the person to take you as a fool ("toke toke toke" or "down-wa").

On the hook, he sings "Ahwenepa nkasa, nnipa dane, saa adefoo na ey3 nsemfo, ofoo na edi asem fo wai" to wit, quality beads do not rattle, human behaviour changes and it is only a worthless person that does foolish things.

Then he continues on the second verse; when you are born a royal, you should act royal because if you eat outside, you might be served a headless bird. Otherwise, someone might disguise a community cup as "virgin"; a cloth seller as a "Mary"; and get you a second-hand cloth (used and discarded outfit) for "wedding."

On the third verse, Lumba jabs his haters, “If you attack me and I don’t respond, it’s simply means I see you as superlatively worthless. I don't engage the insane; I never wallow with pigs in the mud.”

The production of the song has been compared to his previous singles "Enko Den" and "Ye Nea Woho Beto Wo" popularly known as "Yentie Obiaa".

== Promotion ==
On January 1, 2023, Daddy Lumba performed "Ofon Na Ɛdi Asɛm Fo" for the first time at the 2023 KABFAM Legend Night. He opened his performance by singing an a cappella version of the song together with his fans, who sang parts of the song with him.

== See also ==
- Aben Wo Ha
- Yentie Obiaa
- Theresa
- Mpempem Do Me
