= The Bank Hospital =

Hospital in Greater Accra Region, Ghana

Coordinates: 5.58513°N 0.16200°W

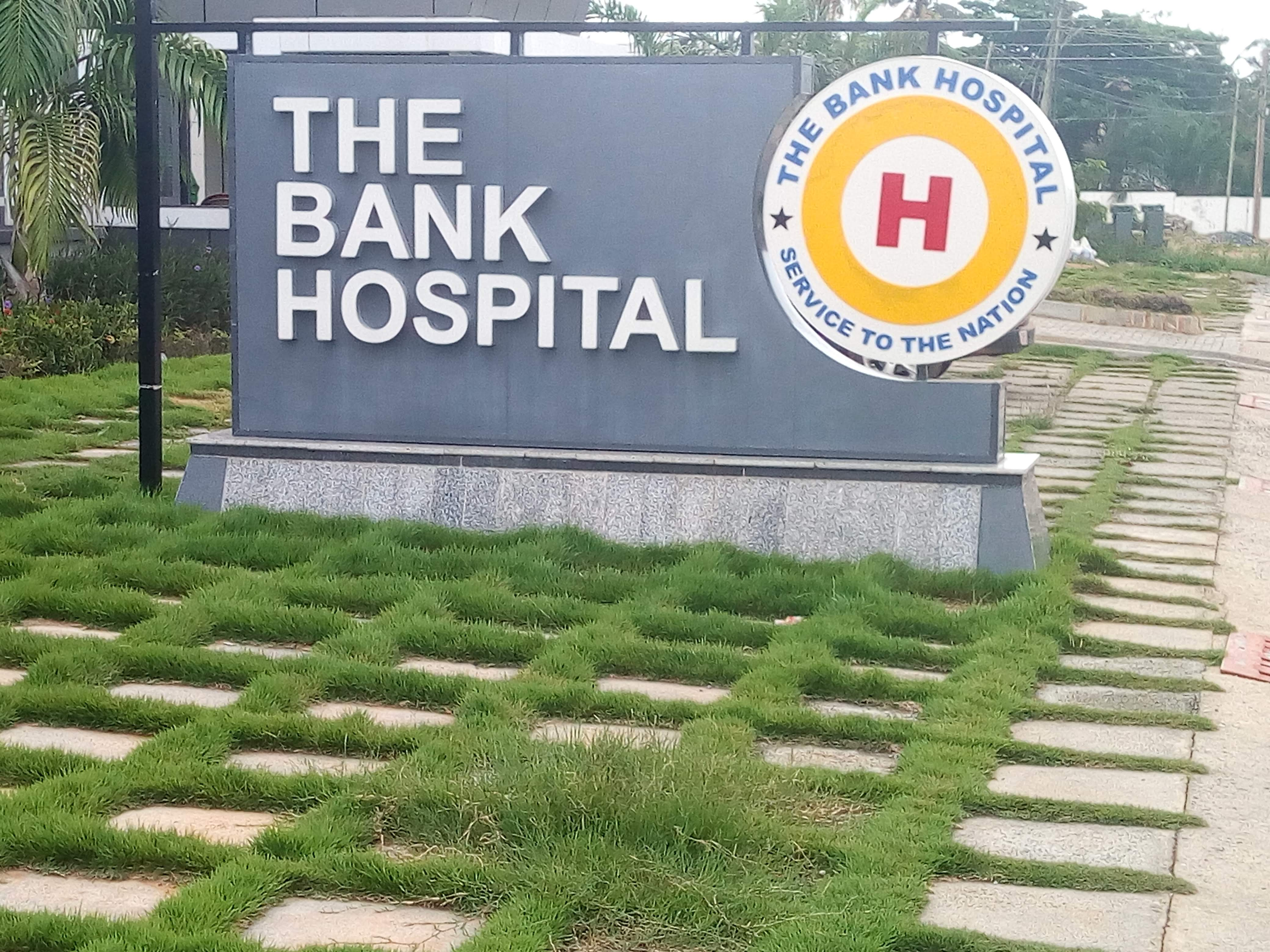
- Signpost

Geography
- Location: Cantonments, Greater Accra, Ghana

Services
- Emergency department: Yes

Links
- Website: www.thebankhospital.com

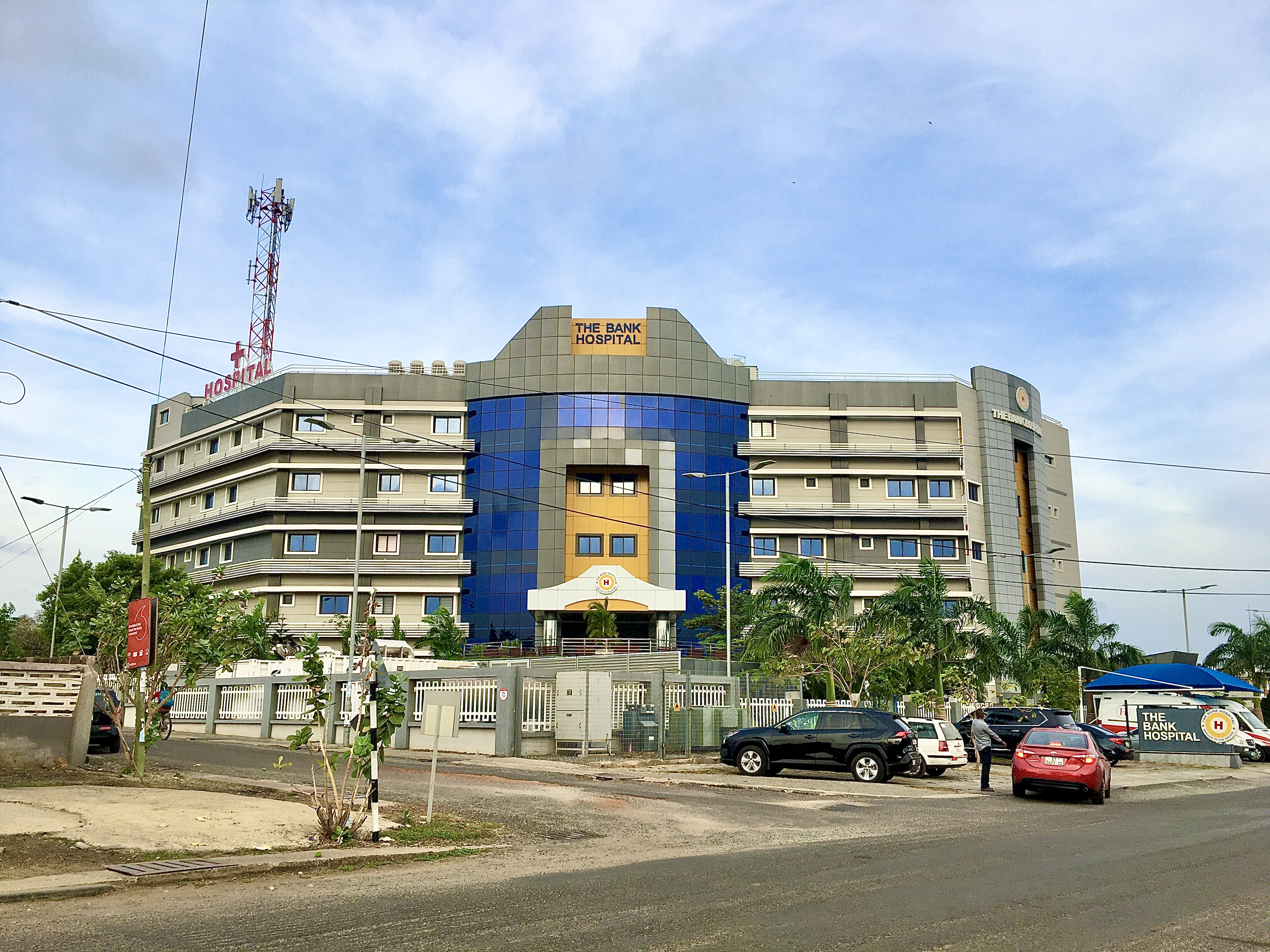

The Bank Hospital also known as The Bank of Ghana Hospital is a hospital in Ghana completed in 2017. The hospital is located at Cantonments in Accra. As of November 2019, the hospital had been left empty for 2 years after completion, in a deteriorating state, after the New Patriotic Party assumed office in 2017 and claimed to be making an audit on the facilities to ensure value for money.

== services ==
Bank hospital offer various services which includes;

- Neonatal
- Paediatric
- Internal Medicine
- Obstetrics & Gynecology
- General & Specialized Surgery

== Director ==
The medical director of the bank hospital acra is Dr. Charlotte Osafo.and the deputy medical director is Dr. Gloria Ansa.
