= Shasha Marley =

Ghana musician

Julius Amua-Sekyi, popularly known as Shasha Marley, is a Ghanaian roots reggae. He is noted for songs such as "Twin City Mafia", "I'm Not Ashamed of the Gospel", and "Maata Family" among others.

== Early life ==
Shasha Marley was born in Sekondi-Takoradi in the Western Region of Ghana to a father who was a retired educationist and a choirmaster. Between 1979 and 1983, he was a student at St. John's Secondary School in Sekondi where he played with the school's band known as Mathew Chapter 5. Right after secondary school, he went mainstream and then on went ahead to release several albums.

== Career ==
During his early days, Shasha Marley spoke of Bob Marley, Burning Spear, Steel Pulse and Jimmy Cliff as his major influences. He released his debut single, "Tell Freedom", which became a major hit in Ghana and beyond. Since then, he has gone on to release several other songs.

== Personal life ==
Shasha Marley is married, with two children. He is a grandson to former Ghana Parliament Member Kobina Amua-Sekyi

== Controversy over Maata Family ==
Though Shasha Marley was already famous in his home country and abroad, the one song that arguably gave him the most exposure particularly in Ghana was "Maata Family". The song, which was released in 2007 had words that suggested flatulence in the Ghanaian parlance. For instance, the title Maata, in the Akan dialect means flatulence and people dragged him for using such words in his song. Also, the usage of Maata Tui, Maata Pue and Mataa Fish somewhat gave credence to the meaning of the song. But Shasha Marley has since refuted the claim and explained that the meaning of the song had nothing to do with flatulence, but rather the names of his pals in Papua New Guinea i.e. Maata Tuitui, Maata Pue and Maata Fish.

== Discography ==
In 1999, Shasha Marley released the album, Tell Freedom, which contained the hit songs, "Seek Ye Good" and "Not Evil". In 2000, he led 15 top Ghanaian musicians in a collaboration against HIV/AIDS in Africa. A song named "Stop Aids, Love Life" was released via the sponsorship of Johns Hopkins University in New York.

In 2001, he released "Enemies Are Not Jah". In 2007, he released 14 songs on his album, Lost and Found. These included "Twin City Mafia", "I'm not Ashamed of the Gospel", "Maata Family", "So Nyame Mo", "Buum Buum-Waa Waa", "Shame Politicians", "Promise Land", "I See No Wrong with Jesus", "Queen of Queens", "Evil Spirits Walk Away", "Eagerness", "Shasha's Creed" and "Will You Be My Friend".

2020 saw the release of "Tha Dawn" on the album Frontline Workers Appreciation. An album from 14 artists from 14 different countries, it was released in support of the frontline workers on the island of Hawaii during the wake of COVID-19.

In 2021, Shasha Marley released "Enemies Are Not Jah" and "Gloria Akuffo". 2022 also saw the release of his latest single, "Tribute to Burning Spear".

== Awards and nominations ==
Year	Nominee / work	Award	Result
2007	GHANA MUSIC AWARDS (MAATA)	Best Male Vocal Performance and Best Reggae Song of the Year	Won
2010	KORA All Africa Music Awards	Best African Reggae Artiste of The Year	Won
2017	DEPARTMENT OF MUSIC EDUCATION... School Of Creative Arts (UNIVERSITY OF EDUCATION, WINNEBA)	Music Honors	Won
2017	ACCRA FM - Nkran Kwanso	Legendary Award Honor	Won
2022	610 MUSIC AWARDS	Lifetime Achievement Honor	Won
