= Abuakwa =

- Town
- Location within Ghana
- Coordinates: 6.299344°N 1.837397°W
- Country: Ghana
- Region: Ashanti Region
- District: Atwima Nwabiagya District
- Time zone: GMT
  - Summer (DST): GMT

Abuakwa is a small town in the Atwima Nwabiagya District of the Ashanti Region.

Abuakwa was founded by Asante migrants in the early 19th century, near the site of the former Denkyira capital Abankeseso, after rebellious Denkyira had fled south of the Ofin River. A rubber boom in the 1880s and 90s attracted still more settlers, as did the cultivation of cocoa in the early 20th century.

== See also ==
- Adanwomase
