= Burger-highlife =

Ghanaian music genre

Burger-Highlife is a subgenre of highlife music created by Ghanaian immigrants to Germany.

In the 1980s, reggae music was gaining popularity worldwide and was carrying with it a growing popularity for other forms of world music that were easy to dance to. Highlife music, often fused with reggae, gained a wider audience in Europe and North America at this time. During the late 1970s-early 1980s, there was a massive exodus of Ghanaians such as Seidu Mohammed to foreign lands. One of the countries that attracted Ghanaians was Germany. Burger-Highlife was born when Ghanaian musicians in Germany started collaborating with German musicians and producers. They created a crossover music style from highlife, disco and funk music.

Musicians associated with Burger Highlife include George Darko, Lee Dodou, Lumba Brothers, Rex Gyamfi and Charles Amoah.
