= Ghanaians in Germany =

- Distribution of Ghanaian citizens in Germany (2021)

Total population
- 42,080 (2021)

Regions with significant populations
- Hamburg · Berlin · Bremen · Hannover

Languages
- English • French • German · Twi · Ga · Dangme · Ewe · Dagbani · Hausa · Guan · Fanti · Nzema · Gonja · Other languages of Ghana

Ghanaian immigrants and their descendants living and working in Germany are estimated to form the second-largest of the country's diaspora populations in Europe, after the United Kingdom.

== History ==
There has been a relationship between Ghana and Germany dating from before the Gold Coast became independent Ghana in 1957. The Volta Region of Ghana was part of the German protectorate of Togoland before World War I. In 1957, 44 Ghanaian students were registered in West German universities through a policy that allowed Africans to build skills in German universities. In the 1960s and 1970s, most of the Ghanaian migrants to Germany were students. They formed local associations in the university towns and cities in Germany, which in turn became the Union of Ghanaian Students in Germany (UGSG).

In 2009, according to Deutsche Gesellschaft fur Technische Zusammenarbeit (GTZ), there were about 40,000 'Ghanaians with a migration background' in Germany.

Almost 9,729 children were born to German-Ghanaian couples between 1965 and 2006, which developed a large group of people with mixed German and Ghanaian heritages. In 2007, 20,329 persons with Ghanaian citizenship were officially registered in Germany; 8,194 Ghanaian citizens became German citizens between 1980 and 2007.

In 2017 Ghana was reported to maintain good relations with Germany, and there was a large Ghanaian community in Germany, many for education, seeking asylum, or for family reunification.

Number of Ghanaians in larger cities
#	City	People
1.	Hamburg	7,550
2.	Bremen	3,170
3.	Berlin	2,124
4.	Hanover	1,813
5.	Frankfurt	1,745
6.	Duisburg	1,433
7.	Cologne	1,254
8.	Kiel	1,037
9.	Braunschweig	1,008
10.	Düsseldorf	975

== Distribution ==
In 2009 Ghanaians in Germany mostly lived in the metropolises of Hamburg, Berlin and Bremen, the Ruhr region, and the Frankfurt/Main metropolitan area. 22.7% of Ghanaian migrants, the highest percentage, live in the city of Hamburg. Also, 23.8% of the Ghanaians living in Germany live in North Rhine-Westphalia. 9.2% of Ghanaian citizens in Germany live in Berlin. 9.8% live in the federal state of Hesse. There has been a long tradition of Ghanaians migrating to Hamburg, hence the concentration of Ghanaians there. In Ghana, the word 'booga' or 'burger', used to refer to migrants, has roots in the name 'Hamburg'.

== Associations ==
In June 2004, through an initiative of the Ghanaian Embassy in Germany, the Union of Ghanaian Associations in Germany (UGAG) was formed to include all Ghanaian associations in Germany. The first attempt in 1996 had failed. Church communities are among the most influential formations as Christianity is the largest religion in Ghana. The Church of Pentecost Germany, Ghana Catholic Mission-Hamburg, the Bethel Church-Stuttgart and the Presbyterian Church of Cologne are the best-known Ghanaian churches in Germany.

== Remittances ==
Ghana is now one of the top recipients of remittances from its global diaspora. Private remittances make up over one-sixth of the country's gross domestic product. In a survey, 90% of Ghanaians transfer money to Ghana for their families. Some even send more than half their income and go into debt.

== Culture ==
=== Music ===
From the late 1970s to the early 1980s, a genre of music came up in Germany and Ghana called Burger Highlife – fusion of highlife, and funk music styles. Ghanaian immigrants in Germany created it.

== Living in Germany ==
=== Education ===
For Ghanaians hoping to study in Germany, the West African Senior School Certificate Examination (WASSCE), valid for direct university admittance in Ghana, is not accepted by German universities; a student has to complete one year of tertiary education in Ghana or complete a one-year preparatory course (Studienkolleg) in Germany. Also, there are no HND top-up courses in Germany; Ghanaians have to apply for the Bachelor's degree in a university of applied sciences.

In the Ghanaian-German community, the second generation often follow Gymnasium. As within the Ghanaian culture, many families have high educational ambitions and place high emphasis on higher education.Ghanaian-German students are motivated to obtain Abitur to enter university.

Learning the German language is required for professions such as nursing and healthcare. Anyone starting a business in Germany must register with the trade office if self-employed, or the tax office to work as freelancers.
