= Yentie Obiaa =

"Ye Nea Woho Beto Wo"

Single by Daddy Lumba

from the album Awosoo
- Genre: Highlife
- Songwriter: Daddy Lumba

"Ye Nea Woho Beto Wo", popularly known as "Yentie Obiaa", is a controversial song by Ghanaian highlife musician Daddy Lumba, from his 2014 album Awosoo.

== Etymology ==
Yentie obiaa literally means "we won't listen to anyone" in Akan. The theme of the song is one should do what he or she pleases and shouldn't listen to anyone.

== Popularity ==
The song first became popular when President John Dramani Mahama went on a three-day tour in the Ashanti Region of Ghana. The song blurred from huge speakers mounted in a car in the President's convoy. This song also became very popular when the President of Ghana John Dramani Mahama and the Asantehene as well as other dignitaries were seen on a video dancing to this tune at a private event hosted by the Asantehene at the Manhyia Palace after a commission of the Kumasi Airport.

== Video ==
The video was shot at the residence of Kenpong, a business mogul who is a friend to Daddy Lumba and a former Board chairman of Asante Kotoko. He is also mentioned in the song.

== See also ==
- Nya Abotare Na Twen Awurade
- Ofon Na Edi Asem Fo
- Aben Wo Ha
