= Bekwai (Ghana parliament constituency) =

Constituency in the Ashanti Region of Ghana

- constituency for the Parliament of Ghana
- District: Bekwai Municipal District
- Region: Ashanti Region of Ghana

Current constituency
- Party: New Patriotic Party
- MP: Ralph Poku-Adusei

Bekwai is one of the constituencies represented in the Parliament of Ghana. It elects one Member of Parliament (MP) by the first past the post system of election. Ralph Poku-Adusei is the member of parliament for the constituency. He is the elected MP to represent NPP. He succeeded Joseph Osei-Owusu who had represented the constituency on the ticket of the Independent candidate.

== See also ==
- List of Ghana Parliament constituencies
