= Aben Wo Ha =

Single by Daddy Lumba

from the album Aben Wo Ha
- Language: Akan (Twi)
- Released: 1998
- Recorded: 1998
- Studio: Rheinklang Studios in Dusseldorf
- Genre: Highlife
- Label: Lumba Productions
- Songwriter: Daddy Lumba
- Producers: Daddy Lumba, Bodo Staiger

"Aben Wo Ha" is a single released by Ghanaian musician Daddy Lumba from his 1998 studio album of the same name.

== Controversy ==
In 1999 there were numerous calls by critics and conservative music fans to ban "Aben Wo Ha" on radio, however, the National Commission on Culture which exercises authority over the music industry in Ghana, decided against banning it.

== Popularity ==
It was alleged that presenter Tommy Annan Forson made the song popular when he refused to play it on radio due to its sexually suggestive lyrics. His decision made people curious about the song.

The song was a commercial success. "Aben Wo Ha" won numerous of awards in 1999 and 2000, including winning the "Song of the Year" award at the maiden Ghana Music Awards held in 2000.

"Aben Wo Ha" still enjoys some level of popularity, even internationally, despite more than two decades since its release. The song became the unofficial welcome song for Ghanaian midfielder Thomas Partey when he signed for Arsenal FC in October 2020, with a video of a fan dancing to the song posted on the official Arsenal Instagram page. In 2015, the video for "Aben Wo Ha" went viral after American rapper Ludacris posted a snippet on his social media accounts.

Former Barcelona and AC Milan midfielder Kevin-Prince Boateng again made the song go viral when he posted a video of himself jamming to "Aben Wo Ha" in his car.
