= Nadowli Kaleo (Ghana parliament constituency) =

Electoral constituency in Ghana

- constituency for the Parliament of Ghana
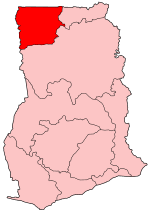
- District: Nadowli-Kaleo District
- Region: Upper West Region of Ghana

Current constituency
- Party: National Democratic Congress
- MP: Anthony Mwinkaara Sumah

Nadowli Kaleo is one of the constituencies represented in the Parliament of Ghana. It elects one Member of Parliament (MP) by the first past the post system of election. Nadowli Kaleo is located in the Nadowli-Kaleo District of the Upper West Region of Ghana.

== Boundaries ==
The seat is located within the Nadowli-Kaleo District of the Upper West Region of Ghana. Its western neighbour is la Côte d'Ivoire. To the north is the Jirapa District, to the east the Daffiama-Bussie-Issa constituency and to the south east the Wa Municipal District and to the south the Wa West District.

== History ==
The constituency was changed in 2012 when the initial Nadowli District was divided into the Nadowli-Kaleo District and Daffiama-Bussie-Issa District. Therefore, the Nadowli Kaleo became the constituency rather than the initial Nadawli West and the Nadowli East constituency was also changed to Daffiama-Bussie-Issa constituency.

== Members of Parliament ==
for initial 1992–2000 (Nadawli North) 2004–2008 (see Nadowli West)

First elected	Member	Party
Nadawli North (1992 - 2000)
1992	Alban Bagbin	National Democratic Congress
Nadawli West (2004 - 2008)
2004	Alban Bagbin	National Democratic Congress
Nadawli Kaleo (2012 to date)
2012	Alban Bagbin	National Democratic Congress
2020	Sumah Anthony Mwinikaara	National Democratic Congress

== Election results ==
2024 Ghanaian general election: Nadawli Kaleo
Party	Candidate	Votes	%	±%
NDC	Sumah Anthony Mwinikaara	24,478	80.75	+14.34
NPP	Francis Xavier Kambotuu	5,834	19.25	−2.00
Majority		18,644	61.50	+16.34
Turnout		30,312		
Registered electors				—

Sumah Anthony Mwinikaara of the National Democratic Congress (NDC) was the first persson to be elected other than Alban Bagbin also of the NDC who had been MP for Nadawli North then Nadawli West and finally Nadawli Kaleo since 1993. Bagbin became the Speaker of the Parliament of Ghana in January 2021.

2020 Ghanaian general election: Nadawli Kaleo
Party	Candidate	Votes	%	±%
NDC	Sumah Anthony Mwinikaara	23,951	66.41	+17.50
NPP	Elvis Banoemuleng Botah	7,664	21.25	−10.63
People's National Convention (Ghana)	Anbataayela Bernard Mornah	4,453	12.35	−5.84
Independent	Saadong Nwinibang-era Fataawu	0	0.00	—
Majority		16,287	45.16	+28.13
Turnout				
Registered electors				—

2016 Ghanaian general election: Nadawli Kaleo
Party	Candidate	Votes	%	±%
NDC	Alban Bagbin	14,044	48.91	−7.16
NPP	Elvis Banoemuleng Botah	9,154	31.88	−23.36
People's National Convention (Ghana)	Anbataayela Bernard Mornah	5,393	18.78	+18.19
CPP	Emmanuel Nassal	120	0.40	—
Majority		4,890	17.03	+3.1
Turnout		29,199	69.92	−12.57
Registered electors		41,758		—

2012 Ghanaian general election: Nadawli Kaleo
Party	Candidate	Votes	%	±%
NDC	Alban Bagbin	16,063	56.07	−5.86
NPP	Robinson Dakubu Boye Bandie	12,073	42.14	+24.69
PPP	Naa Anganngmini Bafar	253	0.88	—
People's National Convention (Ghana)	Kpan Jude Thaddeus	169	0.59	−1.66
NDP	Adama Amora Nuhu	90	0.31	—
Majority		3,990	13.93	−30.55
Turnout		29,436	82.49	+16.88
Registered electors		35,684		—

2008 Ghanaian general election: Nadawli West
Party	Candidate	Votes	%	±%
NDC	Alban Bagbin	12,902	61.93	+11.43
NPP	Eric Kwesi Dakurah	3,636	17.45	−6.25
Independent	Ishak Gaaba Dapilaa	2,898	13.91	−7.49
Democratic Freedom Party	Joachim Kakra Bonseu	841	4.04	—
People's National Convention (Ghana)	Clement Kanfuri Senchi	468	2.25	−0.55
CPP	Emmanuel Kwesi Nasaal	87	0.42	−0.28
Majority		9,266	44.48	17.68
Turnout		21,621	65.61	—
Registered electors		32,956		—

2004 Ghanaian general election: Nadawli West
Party	Candidate	Votes	%	±%
NDC	Alban Bagbin	11,296	50.5	
NPP	Daniel Anleu-Mwine Baga	5,297	23.7	—
Independent	Ishak Gaaba Dapilaa	4,791	21.4	
People's National Convention (Ghana)	Clement Kanfuri Senchi	625	2.8	
DPP	Bisung Edward	188	0.8	—
CPP	Sasuu Bernard Kabawunu	152	0.7	—
Majority		5,999	26.8	
Turnout		23,178	81.36	—
Registered electors		28,486		—

2000 Ghanaian general election: Nadawli North
Party	Candidate	Votes	%	±%
NDC	Alban Bagbin	9,004	58.6	−17.86
Independent	Daniel Baga Anleu-Mwine	3,411	22.2	—
People's National Convention (Ghana)	Clement Kanfuri Senchi	2,089	13.6	+4.56
NPP	Ningkpeng Pauline	718	4.7	−8.72
United Ghana Movement	John Bayon Boniface Wetol	145	0.9	—
Majority		5,593	36.4	−26.64
Turnout		16,133	64.7	—
Registered electors		24,945		—

1996 Ghanaian general election: Nadawli North
Party	Candidate	Votes	%	±%
NDC	Alban Bagbin	12,605	76.46	—
NPP	Lawrence Banyen	2,213	13.42	—
People's National Convention (Ghana)	Yuoni Moses Vaalandzeri	1,490	9.04	—
NCP	Basilide Kpemaal	177	1.07	—
Majority		10,392	63.04	—
Turnout		16,485	—	—
Registered electors		—		—

1992 Ghanaian parliamentary election: Nadawli North
Party	Candidate	Votes	%	±%
NDC	Alban Bagbin			—
Majority				—
Turnout		10,464		—
Registered electors		25,845		—

== See also ==
- List of Ghana Parliament constituencies
