= Daffiama-Bussie-Issa (Ghana parliament constituency) =

Electoral constituency in Ghana

- constituency for the Parliament of Ghana
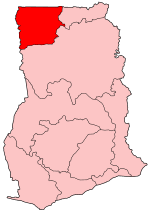
- District: Daffiama-Bussie-Issa District
- Region: Upper West Region of Ghana

Current constituency
- Party: National Democratic Congress
- MP: Sebastian Ngmenenso Sandaare

Daffiama-Bussie-Issa is one of the constituencies represented in the Parliament of Ghana. It elects one Member of Parliament (MP) by the first past the post system of election. Daffiama-Bussie-Issa is located in the Daffiama-Bussie-Issa District of the Upper West Region of Ghana.

== Boundaries ==
The seat is located within the Daffiama-Bussie-Issa District of the Upper West Region of Ghana. Its western neighbour is Nadowli-Kaleo District. To the north is the Jirapa and Sissala West to the east the Sissala East and to the south east the and Wa East to the south the Wa.

== History ==
The constituency was changed in 2012 when the initial Nadowli District was divided into the Nadowli-Kaleo District and Daffiama-Bussie-Issa District. Therefore, the Nadowli-Kaleo became the new constituency for the initial Nadawli West and the Nadowli East constituency was also changed to Daffiama-Bussie-Issa constituency.

== Members of Parliament ==
for initial 1992–2000 (Nadawli South) 2004–2008 (see Nadowli East)

Election	Member	Party
2012	Puozaa Mathias Asuma	National Democratic Congress
2016	Sebastian Sandaare	National Democratic Congress
2020	Sebastian Sandaare	National Democratic Congress

== See also ==
- List of Ghana Parliament constituencies
