= Wa Central (Ghana parliament constituency) =

Constituency in Ghana

- constituency for the Parliament of Ghana
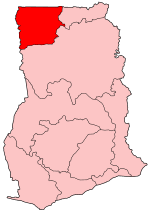
- District: Wa Municipal District
- Region: Upper West Region of Ghana

Current constituency
- Party: National Democratic Congress
- MP: Abdul-Rashid Hassan Pelpuo

Wa Central is one of the constituencies represented in the Parliament of Ghana. It elects one Member of Parliament (MP) by the first past the post system of election. Wa Central is located in the Wa Municipal district of the Upper West Region of Ghana.

== Boundaries ==
The seat is located within the Wa Municipal District of the Upper West Region of Ghana. To the south is the Northern Region, to the east the Wa East District and to the west, the Wa West District. The Nadowli District liest to the north.

== History ==
The constituency was changed in 2004 by the Electoral Commission of Ghana by carving the Wa West constituency out of it.

== Members of Parliament ==
Election	Member	Party
1992	Mumuni Abudu Seidu	National Democratic Congress
2004	Abdul-Rashid Hassan Pelpuo	National Democratic Congress

== Elections ==
2008 Ghanaian parliamentary election: Wa Central Source:Ghana Home Page
Party	Candidate	Votes	%	±%
National Democratic Congress	Abdul-Rashid Hassan Pelpuo	25,428	57.8	—
New Patriotic Party	Eledi Clement N.Lugri	17,309	39.3	—
People's National Convention	Edward Amadu Mumuni	806	1.8	—
Convention People's Party	Issakaque Suleman	391	0.9	—
Democratic People's Party	Sala Seidu	58	0.1	—
Independent	Ibrahim Yusif	0	0.0	—
Majority		7,871	18.5	—
Turnout		—	—	—

== See also ==
- List of Ghana Parliament constituencies
