= Joseph Yieleh Chireh =

Ghanaian politician, lawyer and pharmacist

Honourable Joseph Yieleh Chireh
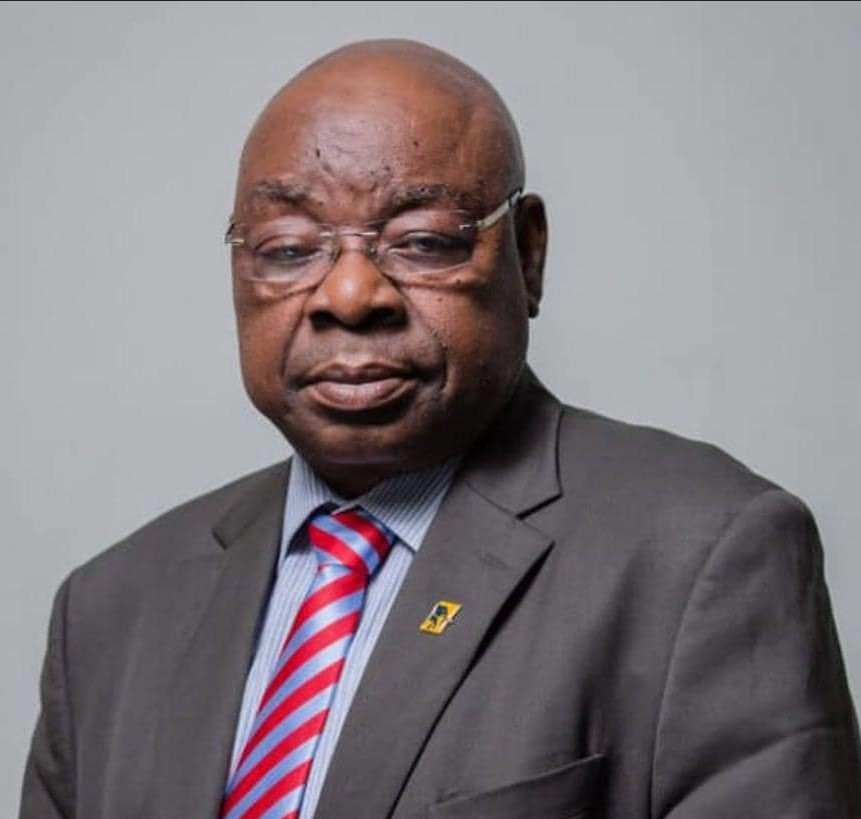

Chairman of the governing board of Pharmacy Council Ghana
- Incumbent
- Assumed office 27 May 2025
- Preceded by: Doris Addae-Afoakwa

Member of Pan-African Parliament
- In office May 2017 – Jan 2021

Chairman of the Board of FBNBank Ghana
- In office Jan 2014 – Feb 2020
- Preceded by: Bank Newly Established
- Succeeded by: Kofo Majekodunmi

Member of Parliament for Wa West
- In office 7 January 2005 – 6 January 2021
- Preceded by: Constituency Newly Created
- Succeeded by: Peter Lanchene Toobu

Minister for Health
- In office Jan 2011 – Jan 2012
- President: John Atta Mills
- Preceded by: Benjamin Kunbuor
- Succeeded by: Alban Bagbin

Minister for Local Government and Rural Development
- In office Feb 2009 – Jan 2011
- President: John Atta Mills
- Deputy: Elvis Afriyie Ankrah
- Preceded by: Kwadwo Adjei-Darko
- Succeeded by: Samuel Ofosu-Ampofo

Ambassador Extraordinary and Plenipotentiary to Algeria with concurrent accreditation to Tunisia, Mauritania and the Sahrawi Arab Democratic Republic
- In office Jul 1997 – Jan 2001
- President: Jerry John Rawlings
- Succeeded by: Clarus Kobina Sekyi

Minister for the Upper West Region
- In office Feb 1993 – Jan 1997
- President: Jerry John Rawlings
- Preceded by: Edward Kojo Salia (PNDC Secretary)
- Succeeded by: Amin Amidu Sulemana

PNDC Secretary at the PNDC Secretariat
- In office May 1985 – Jan 1993
- Appointed by: Jerry John Rawlings
- 1991 – 1993: Chairman, Procurement Taskforce
- 1986 – 1993: Chairman, Confiscated Assets Committee
- 1985 – 1986: Acting Secretary, National Commission for Democracy
- 1985 – 1986: Acting Political Counselor

PNDC Secretary for the Upper West Region
- In office Mar 1983 – May 1985
- Appointed by: Jerry John Rawlings
- Preceded by: Region Newly Created
- Succeeded by: Bawa Salifu Dy-yaka

Personal details
- Born: Joseph Yieleh Chireh; 8 July 1954 (age 72) Lassia Tuolu, Wa West District, Ghana
- Citizenship: Ghanaian
- Party: National Democratic Congress
- Children: 4
- Education: Kwame Nkrumah University of Science and Technology; Ghana School of Law
- Profession: Lawyer, Pharmacist, politician
- Website: Linkedin

Joseph Yieleh Chireh (born 8 July 1954) is a Ghanaian pharmacist, lawyer, diplomat and politician. He is the chairman of the governing board of the Pharmacy Council Ghana having been appointed by President John Dramani Mahama in May 2025. He was the board chairman of FBNBank Ghana, a subsidiary of First Bank of Nigeria from January 2014 to February 2020. He served as the Member for Parliament for Wa West Constituency in the 4th, 5th, 6th and 7th Parliaments of the 4th Republic of Ghana from January 2005 to January 2021. He also served as a member of the Pan-African Parliament between May 2017 to January 2021.

Chireh was the minister for health from January 2011 to March 2012 and minister for local government and rural development from February 2009 to January 2011 under President John Evans Atta Mills.

President Jerry John Rawlings appointed Chireh to serve as Ambassador Extraordinary and Plenipotentiary to Algeria with concurrent accreditation to Tunisia, Mauritania and the Sahrawi Arab Democratic Republic from July 1997 to March 2001 and minister for the Upper West Region from March 1993 to March 1997. Under the Provisional National Defence Council (PNDC), he served in various roles as a PNDC Secretary at the PNDC Secretariat from May 1985 to January 1993 and PNDC Secretary for the Upper West Region between March 1983 and May 1985.

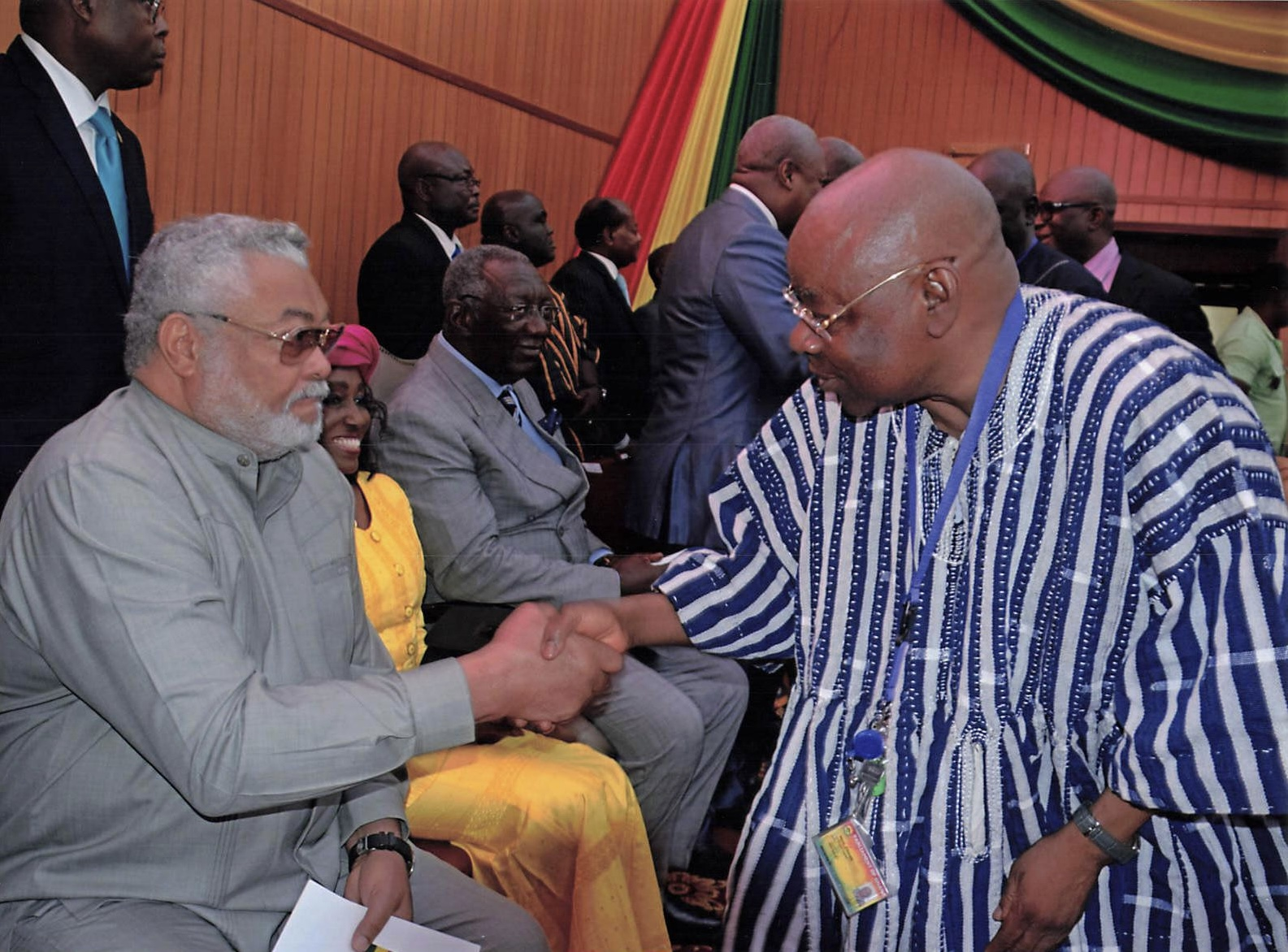
Joseph Yieleh Chireh exchanging pleasantries with President Jerry John Rawlings at State of the Nation Address on 8 February 2018

== Early life and education ==
Chireh was born in the Lassia-Tuolu, a village in Upper West Region of Ghana. He attended the Navrongo Secondary School in the Upper East Region from 1968 to 1975 where obtained both Ordinary and Advanced Level West African Examination Council School certificates.

He studied at the Kwame Nkrumah University of Science and Technology from 1975 and obtained a Bachelor of Pharmacy degree in 1979. He proceeded to the Ghana School of Law in 2001 and qualified as a lawyer in 2006.

Before entering into politics, he was the pharmacist-in-charge at the Agogo Presbyterian Hospital between 1979 and 1981. From 1981 to 1983, he was the superintendent pharmacist at F.K. Ampadu Pharmacy in Adabraka.

== Parliamentary career (2005–2021) ==
=== 2004 general elections ===
Yieleh Chireh contested the 2004 Ghanaian general election to represent the newly created Wa West constituency in parliament on 7 December 2004 on the ticket of the National Democratic Congress (NDC) which was in the opposition at the time. He won the election decisively, with over 66 percent of the valid votes cast, having obtained 13,256 votes. He took his seat in the Fourth parliament of the Fourth Republic on 7 January 2005. His closest contender, Major Edward Yirimambo (Rtd) obtained 6,071 votes, representing 30.4 percent of the valid votes cast on the ticket of the New Patriotic Party (NPP).

2004 Wa West Parliamentary Election Results
| Candidate | Party | Votes | % |
|---|---|---|---|
| Joseph Yieleh Chireh ✅ | NDC | 13,256 | 66.3 |
| Maj. Edward Yirimambo (Rtd) | NPP | 6,071 | 30.4 |
| Matthew Saa-ih Vaari | PNC | 653 | 3.3 |
| Total Valid Votes | | 19,980 | 100 |

=== 2008 general elections ===
He retained his seat in the 2008 after winning with 10,468 votes representing 49.97% against his closest opponents Dari Daniel Kuusongno of the New Patriotic Party, Major Edward Yirimambo (Rtd), an independent candidate who had 4,455 votes representing 21.27% and 5,541 votes representing 26.45% respectively. In the 5th parliament he served on the Foreign Affairs committee, Employment, Social Welfare and State Enterprises committee.

2008 Wa West Parliamentary Election Results
| Candidate | Party | Votes | % |
|---|---|---|---|
| Joseph Yieleh Chireh ✅ | NDC | 10,468 | 49.97 |
| Maj. Edward Yirimambo (Rtd) | Independent | 5,541 | 26.45 |
| Dari Daniel Kuusongno | NPP | 4,455 | 21.27 |
| Iddrisu Ibrahim | PNC | 243 | 1.16 |
| John Zooyari | CPP | 241 | 1.15 |
| Ghadaphi Al-Hassan Kanda | DPP | 0 | 0.00 |
| Total Valid Votes | | 20,948 | 100 |

=== 2012 general elections ===
Chireh retained his seat again in the 2012 parliamentary elections after securing 16,368 votes representing 57.71% against his closest contender the New Patriotic Party's candidate Adams Nuhu Timbile who had 9,918 representing 34.97%

2012 Wa West Parliamentary Election Results
| Candidate | Party | Votes | % |
|---|---|---|---|
| Joseph Yieleh Chireh ✅ | NDC | 16,368 | 57.71 |
| Nuhu Timbile Adams | NPP | 9,918 | 34.97 |
| Felix Sortul Pigru | PPP | 1,744 | 6.15 |
| Dare Waribata | NDP | 333 | 1.17 |
| Total Valid Votes | | 28,363 | 100 |

=== 2016 general elections ===
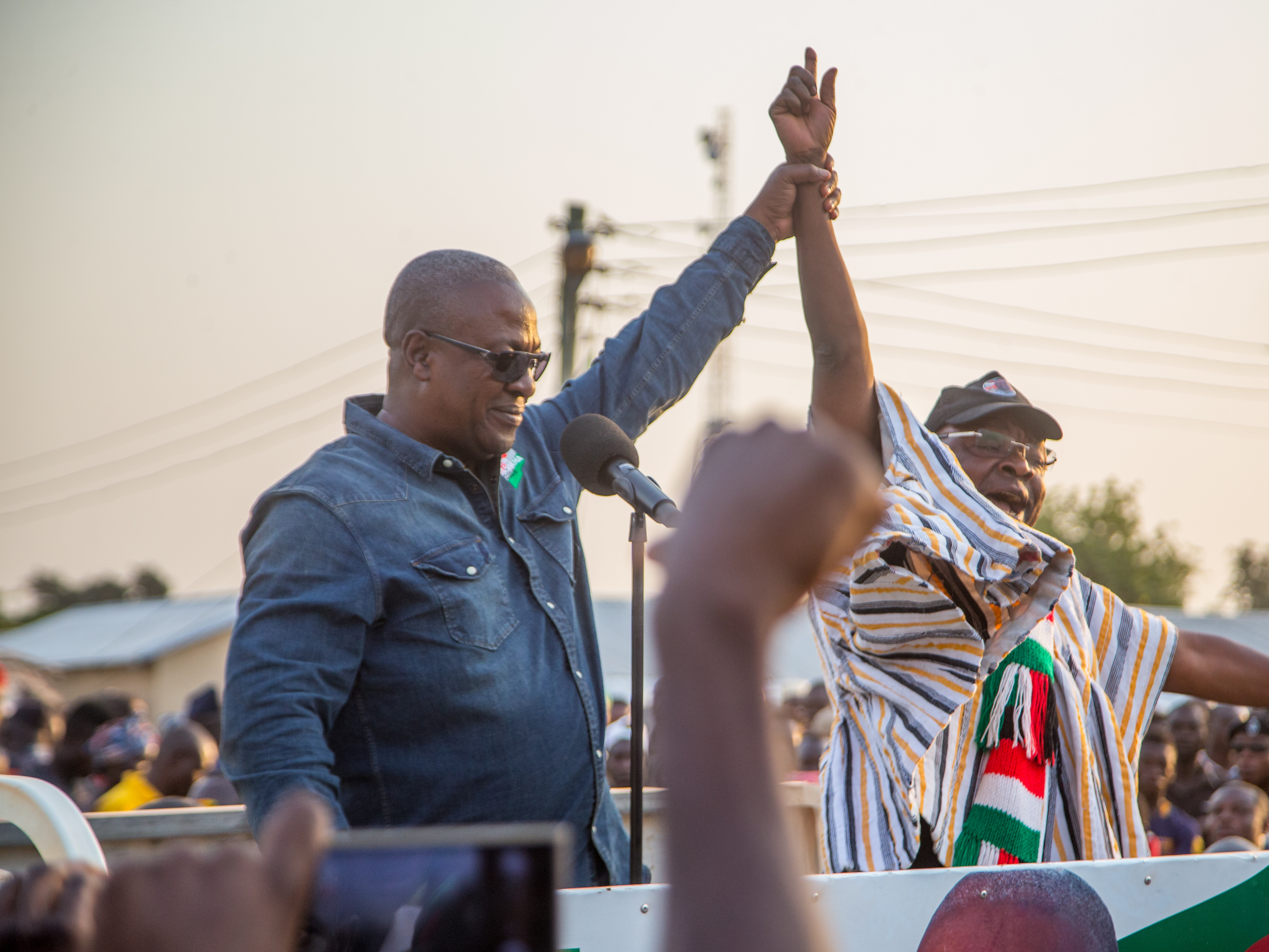
Joseph Yieleh Chireh at a rally campaigning with President John Dramani Mahama on 17 November 2016 in Wechiau, Wa West

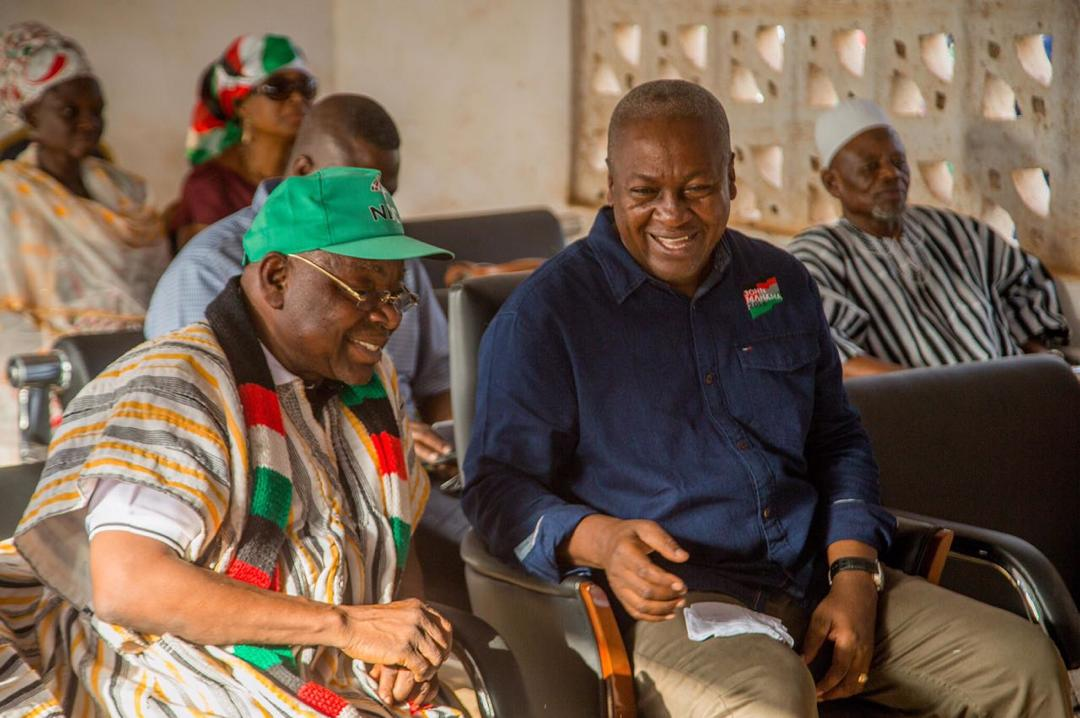
Joseph Yieleh Chireh with President John Dramani Mahama paying a courtesy call on the Wechiau Naa on 17 November 2016

Chireh was voted for again to represent the Wa West constituency for a 4th term in the 7th parliament. He polled 12,658 votes (42.53%) whilst his two main opponents Patrick Bandanaa, an independent candidate and Dari Daniel Kuusongno of the New Patriotic Party who he had faced in the 2008 had 8,765 votes (29.58%) and 7,357 votes (24.83%) respectively.

In the 7th parliament of the 4th republic, he served on the Subsidiary Legislation Committee, Local Government and Rural Development Committee and Appointments Committee.

2016 Wa West Parliamentary Election Results
| Candidate | Party | Votes | % |
|---|---|---|---|
| Joseph Yieleh Chireh ✅ | NDC | 12,603 | 42.53 |
| Patrick Bandanaa | Independent | 8,765 | 29.58 |
| Dari Daniel Kuusongno | NPP | 7,357 | 24.83 |
| Felix Sortul Pigru | PPP | 448 | 1.51 |
| Jargu Issahaku Sanda | CPP | 279 | 0.94 |
| Dare Waribata | NDP | 181 | 0.61 |
| Total Valid Votes | | 29,633 | 100 |

=== Service in the Pan-African Parliament ===
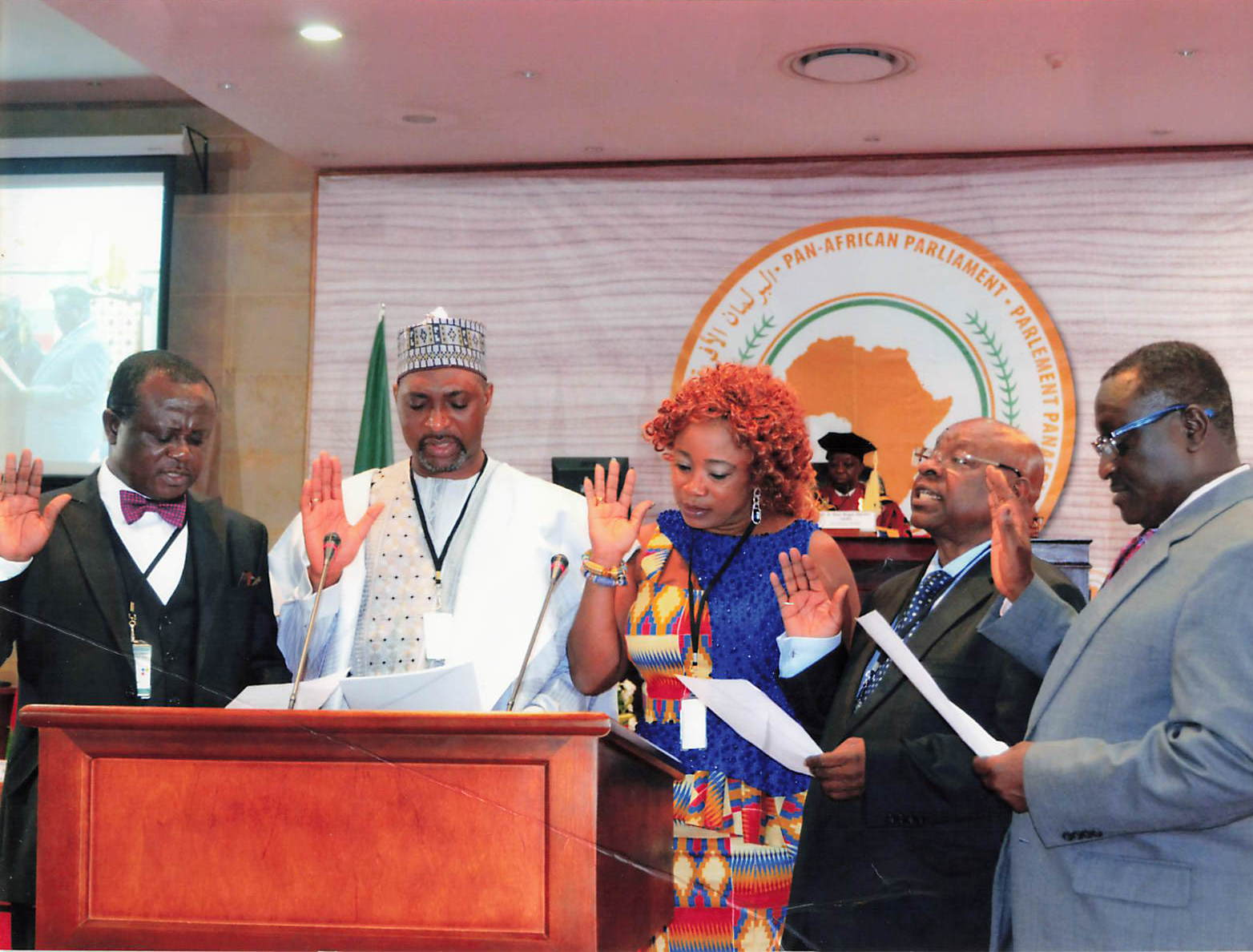
Joseph Yieleh Chireh (2nd from right) being sworn in as a Member of Pan-African Parliament in May 2017 in South Africa

Yieleh Chireh was selected as part of five members of the Parliament of Ghana to represent Ghana at the Pan-African Parliament from May 2017 to January 2021. As a member of the Pan-African Parliament, he served on the Committee on Health, Labour and Social Affairs.

=== Committee service in Parliament ===
Yieleh Chireh served on numerous standing and select committees of Parliament throughout his 16-year service as the member of parliament for the Wa West constituency. The table below provides the details of his committee service in parliament.

Committee Service in Parliament
| Designation | Committee | Start | End |
|---|---|---|---|
| Chairman | Ghana-China Parliamentary Friendship Association | 2018 | 2021 |
| Member | Ghana-France Parliamentary Friendship Association | 2018 | 2021 |
| Member | Committee on Appointments | 2013 | 2021 |
| Member | Committee on Local Government | 2009 | 2021 |
| Member | Committee on Subsidiary Legislation | 2005 | 2021 |
| Ranking Member | Committee on Health | 2017 | 2019 |
| Chairman | Committee on Health | 2013 | 2017 |
| Deputy Ranking Member | Committee on Subsidiary Legislation | 2013 | 2017 |
| Member | Committee on Employment, Social Welfare and State Enterprises | 2009 | 2013 |
| Member | Committee on Foreign Affairs | 2008 | 2013 |
| Ranking Member | Committee on Trade, Industry and Tourism | 2008 | 2009 |
| Member | Committee on Standing Orders | 2008 | 2009 |
| Deputy Ranking Member | Committee on the Judiciary | 2006 | 2007 |
| Member | Committee on Employment, Social Welfare and State Enterprises | 2006 | 2007 |
| Ranking Member | Committee on Local Government and Rural Development | 2005 | 2006 |

== Public service and politics (1983–present) ==
=== Chairman of the governing board of Pharmacy Council Ghana ===
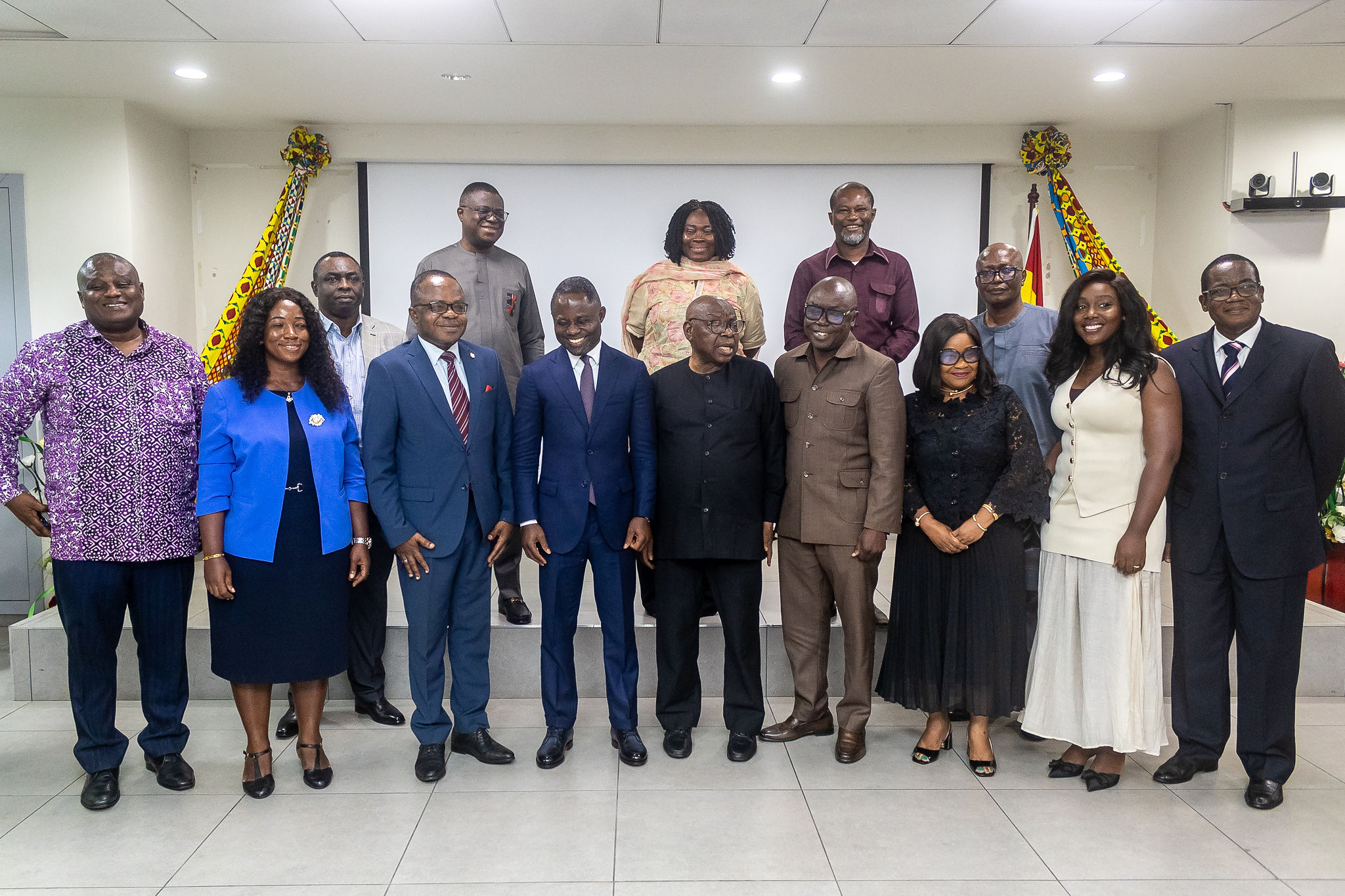
Joseph Yieleh Chireh (first row, middle) with Minister for Health Kwabena Mintah Akandoh (first row, 4th from left) at Pharmacy Council Board Swearing in on 27 May 2025

In May 2025, President John Dramani Mahama appointed Chireh to chair the governing board of the Pharmacy Council Ghana. The board was sworn in on 27 May 2025 by Health Minister Kwabena Mintah Akandoh.

=== Minister for health ===
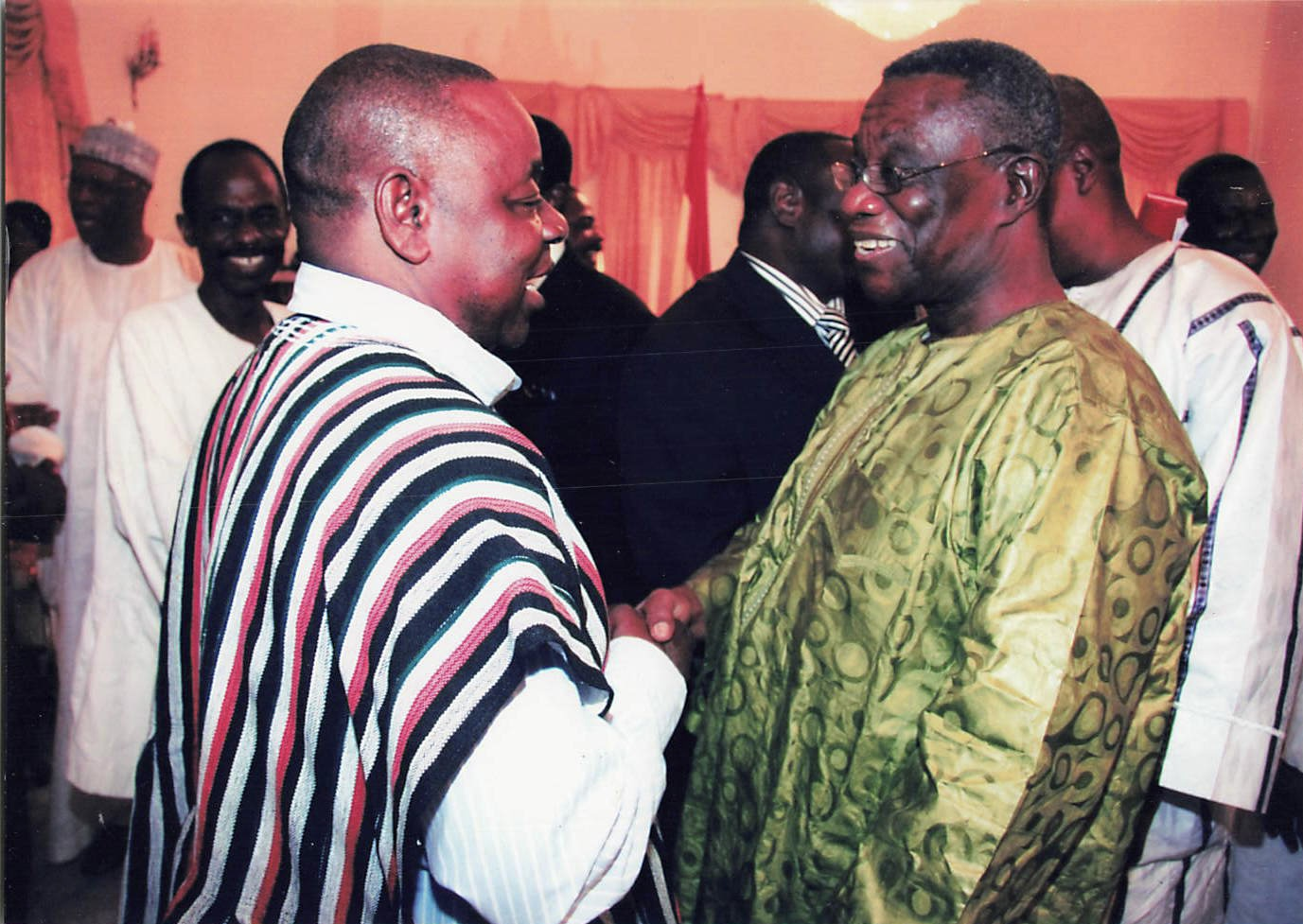
Joseph Yieleh Chireh in a hearty conversation with President John Atta Mills on 13 February 2009 at the Ministerial Swearing-in ceremony

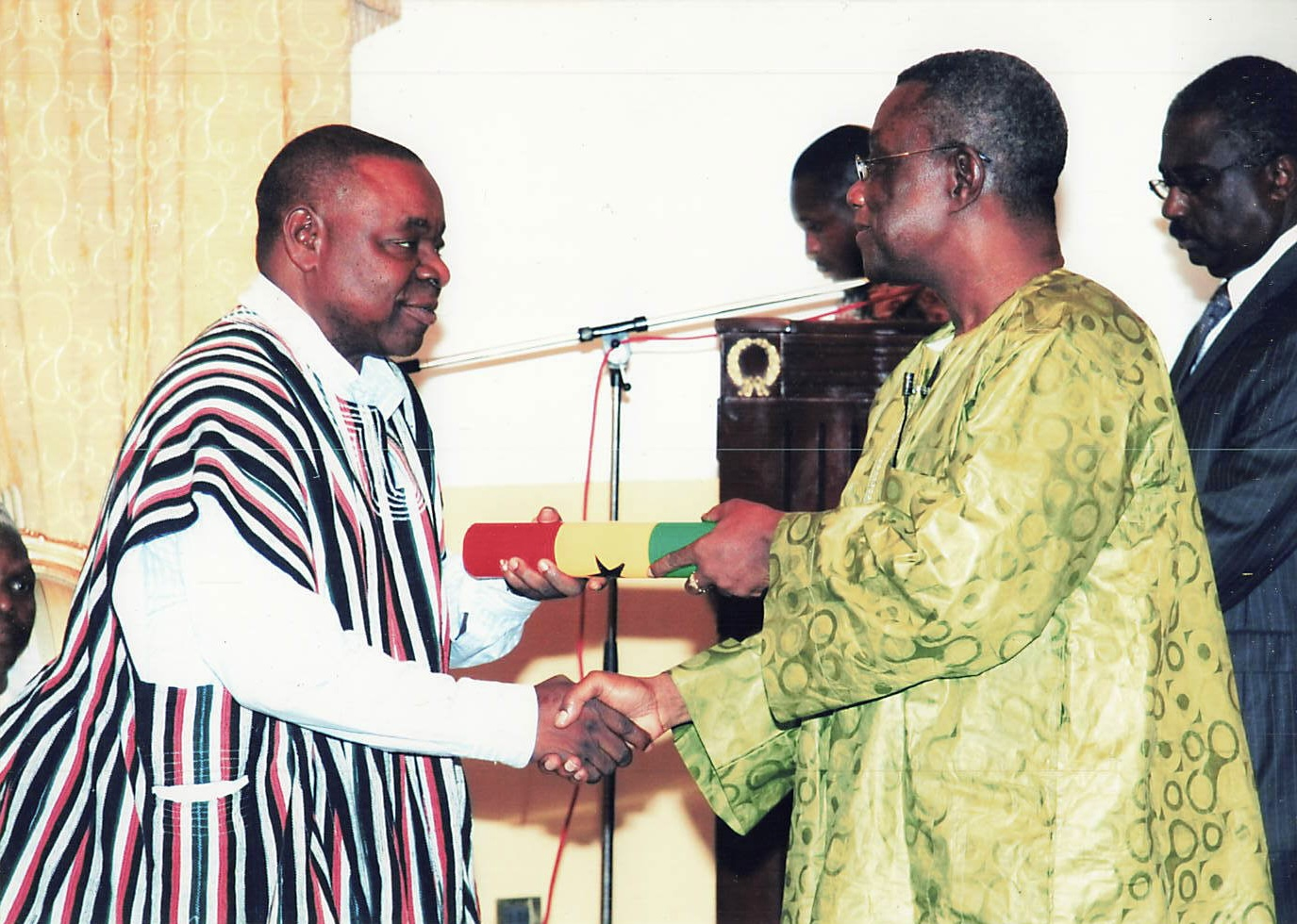
Joseph Yieleh Chireh receives his scroll of office as a Minister of State from President John Atta Mills on 13 February 2009

Joseph Yieleh Chireh addresses a United Nations High-Level Meeting on Non-Communicable Diseases as Minister for Health on 19 September 2011 at the General Assembly

On 4 January 2011, he was appointed minister for health by the president, John Evans Atta Mills, in a cabinet reshuffle. He was also a cabinet minister in this role. He served in the role until January 2012 when he was succeeded by Alban Sumana Kingsford Bagbin.

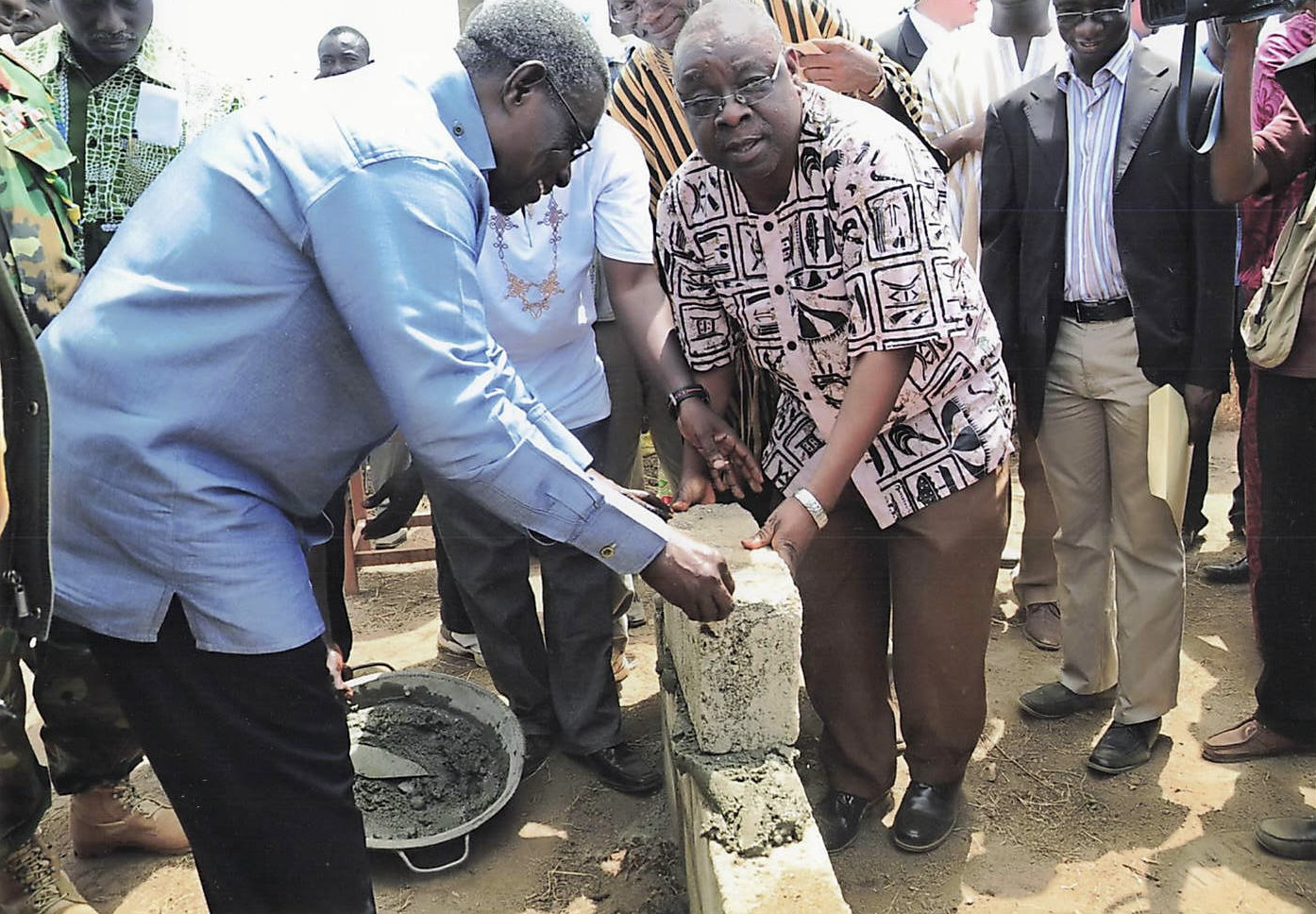
Joseph Yieleh Chireh in Hain, Jirapa District, Upper West Region with President John Atta Mills on 29 March 2011 at a sod-cutting ceremony for a polyclinic.

=== Minister for local government ===
In February 2009, he was appointed minister for local government and rural development by the new president of Ghana, John Atta Mills. He was also named as a member of the cabinet.

=== Ambassador to Algeria ===
Yieleh Chireh was appointed Ghana's Ambassador Extraordinary and Plenipotentiary to Algeria with concurrent accreditation to Tunisia, the Sahrawi Arab Democratic Republic and Mauritania in July 1997 by President Jerry John Rawlings. He served as ambassador until January 2001.

=== Upper West regional minister ===
Chireh joined the National Democratic Congress when it was formed in 1992 on the resumption of party politics in Ghana. He was appointed by President Jerry John Rawlings as Upper West Regional minister in his government in February 1993.

=== PNDC secretary at the PNDC secretariat ===
Yieleh Chireh served as acting political counselor for the Committees of the Defence of the Revolution (CDR) from 1985 to 1986. In a concurrent appointment, he doubled as the acting secretary for the National Commission for Democracy (NCD), which was responsible for registering voters, supervising all public elections and referendums as well as demarcating all electoral boundaries. He served as the chairman of the Confiscated Assets Committee (CAC) between 1986 and 1993.

In 1991, PNDC chairman Jerry John Rawlings appointed Chireh chairman of the Procurement Taskforce. As chairman he is credited with spearheading the investigations of procurement malpractices in selected Ministries, Departments and Agencies (MDAs); notable among them is the Ministry of Health, the Volta River Authority, Electricity Corporation of Ghana and the Post and Telecommunications Corporation. He served in this role until 1993.

=== PNDC Secretary for the Upper West Region ===
PNDC Chairman Jerry John Rawlings appointed Chireh to serve as the first PNDC Secretary for the newly created Upper West Region in March 1983. He served in this role until May 1985 having been reassigned to serve as PNDC Secretary at the PNDC Secretariat in Accra. He was succeeded by Bawa Salifu Dy-yaka.

== Chairman of FBNBank Ghana ==
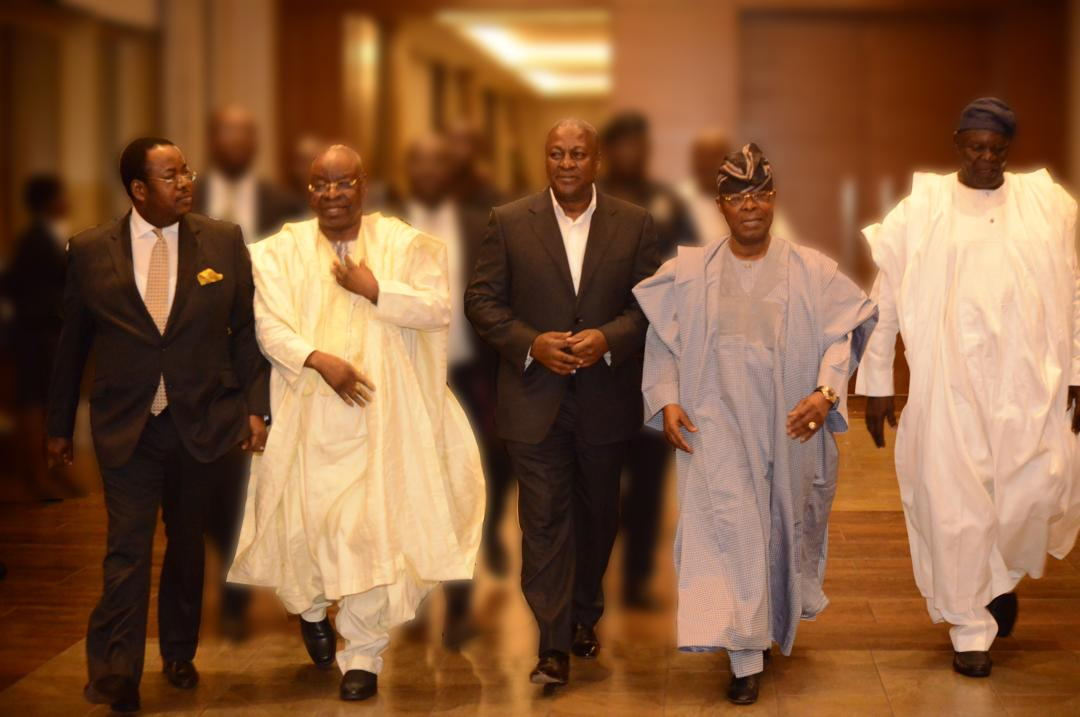
Joseph Yieleh Chireh (2nd from left) with President John Dramani Mahama (middle) at FBNBank Ghana launch on 9 October 2014

Yieleh Chireh served as the board chairman of FBNBank Ghana, a subsidiary of First Bank of Nigeria. He served the maximum of two three-year terms from January 2014 to February 2020 a general term-limit imposed by the Bank of Ghana's Corporate Governance Directive issued in December 2018.

== Professional associations ==
=== Pharmacy Council ===
Chireh has been a registered pharmacist with the Ghana Pharmacy Council since 1981.

=== Pharmaceutical Society of Ghana (PSGH) ===
Yieleh Chireh has been a member of the Pharmaceutical Society of Ghana since 1981. He has been a fellow of the society since 2011.

=== Ghana Bar Association (GBA) ===
Chireh was called to the Ghanaian bar in 2006 and has been a member of the Ghana Bar Association (GBA) since 2006.

=== West African Postgraduate College of Pharmacists (WAPCP) ===
He has been a fellow of the West African Postgraduate College of Pharmacists (WAPCP) since 2012.

== Summary of positions held ==
Other offices
| Preceded by Doris Addae-Afoakwa | Chairman of the governing board of Pharmacy Council Ghana; May 2025 – present | Incumbent |
| First Bank newly established | Chairman of the Board of FBNBank Ghana; Jan 2014 – Feb 2020 | Succeeded by Kofo Majekodunmi |
Parliament of Ghana
| First Constituency newly created | Member of Parliament for Wa West; 7 Jan 2005 – 6 Jan 2021 | Succeeded by Peter Lanchene Toobu |
Political offices
| Preceded by Not applicable | Member of Pan-African Parliament; May 2017 – Jan 2021 | Succeeded by Not applicable |
| Preceded by Benjamin Kunbuor | Minister for Health; Jan 2011 – Jan 2012 | Succeeded by Alban Bagbin |
| Preceded by Kwadwo Adjei-Darko | Minister for Local Government and Rural Development; Feb 2009 – Jan 2011 | Succeeded by Samuel Ofosu-Ampofo |
| Preceded by ? | Ambassador to Algeria; Jul 1997 – Jan 2001 | Succeeded by Clarus Kobina Sekyi |
| Preceded by Edward Kojo Salia (PNDC Secretary) | Minister for the Upper West Region; Feb 1993 – Jan 1997 | Succeeded by Amin Amidu Sulemana |
| Preceded by Not applicable | PNDC Secretary at the PNDC Secretariat; May 1985 – Jan 1993 | Succeeded by Not applicable |
| First Region newly created | PNDC Secretary for the Upper West Region; Mar 1983 – May 1985 | Succeeded by Bawa Salifu Dy-yaka |

== Personal life ==
Chireh is a Catholic and is married with 4 children.

== See also ==
- Rawlings government
- List of Mills government ministers
- Wa West constituency
