= Nadowli West (Ghana parliament constituency) =

Defunct electoral constituency in Ghana

- constituency for the Parliament of Ghana
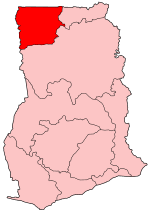
- District: Nadowli District
- Region: Upper West Region of Ghana

Current constituency
- Party: National Democratic Congress

Nadowli West was one of the constituencies represented in the Parliament of Ghana. It elects one Member of Parliament (MP) by the first past the post system of election. Nadowli West is located in the Nadowli district of the Upper West Region of Ghana.

== Boundaries ==
The seat was located within the Nadawli District of the Upper West Region of Ghana. Its western neighbour was la Côte d'Ivoire. To the north was the Jirapa/Lambussie District, to the east the Nadowli East constituency and to the south east the Wa Municipal District and to the south the Wa West District.

== History ==
The constituency changed in 2004 when the Electoral Commission of Ghana changed the initial Nadowli North to Nadawli West and the Nadwoli South to Nadowli East constituency.

== Members of Parliament ==
| Election | Member | Party |
|---|---|---|
| 1992 (Nadawli North) | Alban Bagbin | National Democratic Congress |
| 2004 | Alban Bagbin | National Democratic Congress |
| 2012– | see Nadowli Kaleo (Ghana parliament constituency) | |

== Elections ==
2008 Ghanaian general election: Nadawli West
| Party | Candidate | Votes | % | ±% |
|---|---|---|---|---|
| NDC | Alban Bagbin | 12,902 | 61.93 | +11.43 |
| NPP | Eric Kwesi Dakurah | 3,636 | 17.45 | −6.25 |
| Independent | Ishak Gaaba Dapilaa | 2,898 | 13.91 | −7.49 |
| Democratic Freedom Party | Joachim Kakra Bonseu | 841 | 4.04 | — |
| People's National Convention (Ghana) | Clement Kanfuri Senchi | 468 | 2.25 | −0.55 |
| CPP | Emmanuel Kwesi Nasaal | 87 | 0.42 | −0.28 |
| Majority | | 9,266 | 44.48 | 17.68 |
| Turnout | | 21,621 | 65.61 | — |
| Registered electors | | 32,956 | | — |

2004 Ghanaian general election: Nadawli West
| Party | Candidate | Votes | % | ±% |
|---|---|---|---|---|
| NDC | Alban Bagbin | 11,296 | 50.5 | |
| NPP | Daniel Anleu-Mwine Baga | 5,297 | 23.7 | — |
| Independent | Ishak Gaaba Dapilaa | 4,791 | 21.4 | |
| People's National Convention (Ghana) | Clement Kanfuri Senchi | 625 | 2.8 | |
| DPP | Bisung Edward | 188 | 0.8 | — |
| CPP | Sasuu Bernard Kabawunu | 152 | 0.7 | — |
| Majority | | 5,999 | 26.8 | |
| Turnout | | 23,178 | 81.36 | — |
| Registered electors | | 28,486 | | — |

== See also ==
- List of Ghana Parliament constituencies
