= Kambali =

Kambali is a community in Wa municipality in the Upper West Region of Ghana. History had it that natives of this community migrated from part of northern region and settle in the village of Bulenga in the present day Fusi District of the Upper West Region of Ghana.
