= Peter Lanchene Toobu =

Ghanaian politician

Hon. Peter Lanchene Toobu
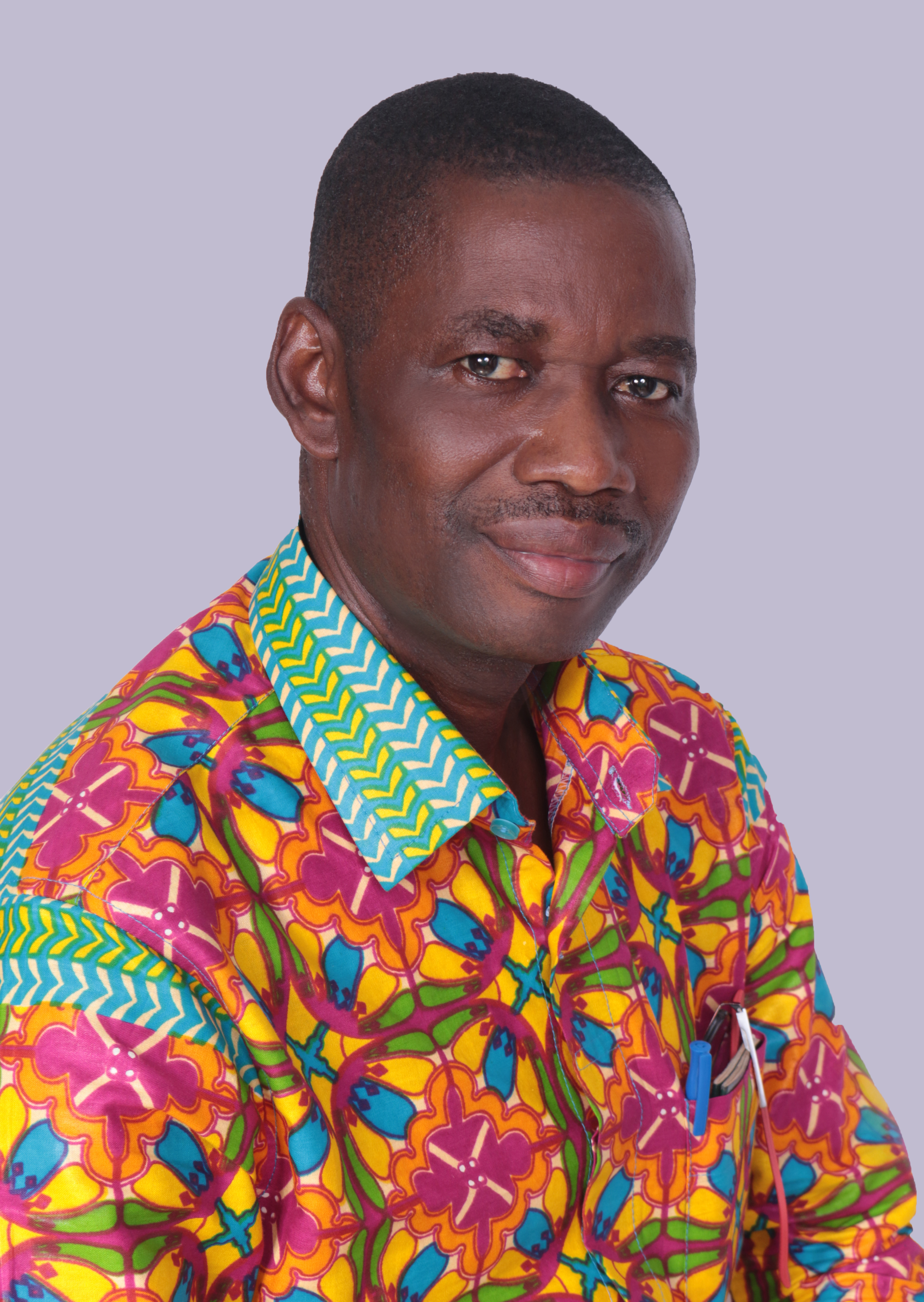

Member of Parliament for Wa West Constituency
- Incumbent
- Assumed office 7 January 2021
- Preceded by: Joseph Yieleh Chireh

Personal details
- Party: National Democratic Congress
- Occupation: Security Expert, Politician
- Profession: Police Officer

Peter Lanchene Toobu (born 8 June 1968) is a Ghanaian retired police officer and politician who is a member of the National Democratic Congress. He is the member of Parliament for the Wa West Constituency in the Upper West region. He is a Retired Superintendent of Police in Ghana.

== Early life and education ==
Toobu was born on 8 June 1968. He hails from Jirapa in the Upper West Region of Ghana. He has his secondary school education at Lawra Secondary School in Lawra in the Upper West Region of Ghana. He was trained as Police Officer at the Ghana Police Academy. He holds a Master of Arts degree in Leadership from the Kofi Annan International Peacekeeping Training Centre.

== Career ==
Toobu served in the Ghana Police Service and rose to the rank of Superintendent of Police before retiring. He served as the Executive Secretary to the former Inspector General of Police (IGP) David Asante Apeatu from 2017 until he resigned and retired from the service to go into Politics in 2019.

== Politics ==
=== Parliamentary bid ===
Toobu won the parliamentary bid to represent the National Democratic Congress for the Wa West Constituency ahead of the 2020 elections in August 2019 after securing 775 votes to beat incumbent member of parliament former Minister of Local Government Joseph Yieleh Chireh who polled 317 votes and who had served as MP since 2004.

Ahead of the 2020 General elections he was appointed as the National Democratic Congress’ (NDC) Spokesperson on Security and was heard on various radio and television stations speaking about policies his party had concerning security.

In December 2020, Toobu won the Wa West Constituency seat in the parliamentary elections. He won by polling 27,550 votes against his closest opponent, Dari Daniel Kuusongno who obtained 13,143 votes from the 40,829 total votes cast.

=== Member of parliament ===
On 7 January 2021, Toobu was sworn in as Member of Parliament representing the Wa West Constituency in the 8th Parliament of the 4th Republic of Ghana. He serves as a member on the Members Holding Offices of Profit Committee and the Defence and Interior Committee of Parliament.

On 6 April 2021, he petitioned the Speaker of Parliament, Alban Bagbin to draw the President's attention to issues relating to security and address the growing insecurity within Ghana. He pointed out armed robbery cases in his constituency, Wa West and surrounding areas from Sissala East to Bawku West.

== Personal life ==
Toobu is a Christian.
