= Ghana Standards Authority =

Ghana Standards Board

Agency overview
- Formed: 1973
- Jurisdiction: Ghana
- Headquarters: Ghana
- Agency executive: Professor Alex Dodoo, Director General
- Website: Official website

The Ghana Standards Authority (GSA) formerly Ghana Standards Board (GSB) is a Government of Ghana agency responsible for the maintenance of acceptable standards for product and services and sound management practices in industries and public institutions in Ghana.

== History ==
The Ghana Standards Authority then a Board, was set up in 1973 by NRC Decree,173. The body was established by the Standards Decree, 1967 (NLCD 199), which has been superseded by the Standards Decree, 1973 (NRCD 173). The Authority is also the custodian of the Weights and Measures Decree (NRCD 326, 1975).

== Functions ==
The board's functions are:

- to establish and promote standards for the manufacturing of high quality goods and services in Ghana.
- to improve the levels of standards in industry and commerce.
- to promote productivity and efficiency in work places
- to promote standards in public health, safety and welfare for consumers of various goods and services.

== Divisions ==
The following divisions are under the Ghana Standards Authority:

- Metrology
- Standards
- Testing
- Certification
- Inspectorate
- Administration & Organizational Dev.
- Finance & Corporate Planning.

The Authority uses four strategies in performing its functions namely: Metrology, Standards, Testing and Quality Assurance (MSTQ). The Ghana Standards Board's function in industry include the development of standards, certification of systems used in industries. It also certifies products and runs test training for industries to promote compliance of industries to the set standards of the board. The board reviews industry conformity to regulations and calibrates weighing and measuring instruments such as fuel pumps. The board performs physical analysis of products before they can be sold.

== Regional offices ==
The authority operates a decentralized system for effective monitoring and supervision, allowing it to operate at a regional level. There are seven regional board offices:

- Accra, responsible for the Greater Accra Region
- Ho, responsible for Volta Region
- Koforidua, responsible for the Eastern Region
- Takoradi, responsible for Western Region
- Kumasi, responsible for Ashanti Region
- Sunyani, responsible for Bono and Ahafo Regions
- Cape Coast, responsible for Central Region
- Tamale, in charge of the three Northern Regions namely Upper East, Upper West and Northern Regions.

== Inspection entry point ==
The board promotes product safety by monitoring all goods that are imported to and exported from the country. There are six official entry points into Ghana, each of which is staffed by GSB personnel:

- Tema Harbour
- Takoradi Harbour
- Accra International Airport
- Aflao entry point
- Elubo entry point
- Paga entry point

== Activities ==
The Ghana Standard Authority recently undertook a market inspection exercise, they stormed major manufacturing plants and companies to assess the standards of their products. The exercise was led by the GSA Regional Manager for Greater Accra Region Mr. Clement Kubati and, staff supported by law enforcement agencies, he closed down several manufacting companies and warehouses in the Region. The Regional Manager disclosed that several items failed quality tests conducted by the Authority.

The first day saw the Ghana Standards Authority (GSA) shut down four mattress manufacturing companies at Afienya closed to Tema. The companies include Yin Yuan Jia Limited, Mooda Limited, Hue Sheng Company and Asano Service; they were completely sealed off by regulatory officers on Monday 18th May, 2026.

Some sections of the Ashaiman China Mall warehouse were closed due to suspected substandard mattresses, electrical appliances, and other products. This was discovered during the market inspection exercise. The GSA also shut down 5A Homes, a Chinese-owned manufacturing company at Dawhenya.

The closure was executed during the second day of the Authority's enforcement operations to clamp down on campanies producing substandard products and selling in Ghana.

== Affiliations ==
The Ghana Standards Authority takes part in: It is affiliated to the following institutions:

- International Organization for Standardization (ISO)
- International Organisation for Legal Meteorology (OIML)
- African Organisation for Standardization (ARSO)
- CODEX Alimentarius Commission (CODEX)
- Africa Electro-Technical Commission (AFSEC)
- International Bureau of Weights and Measures (BIPM)
- International Electrotechnical Commission (IEC)
- ASTM International

== See also ==
- International Organization for Standardization
- International Bureau of Weights and Measures
- ASTM International
