= Anthony Mwinkaara Sumah =

Ghanaian politician

Hon Anthony Mwinkaara Sumah
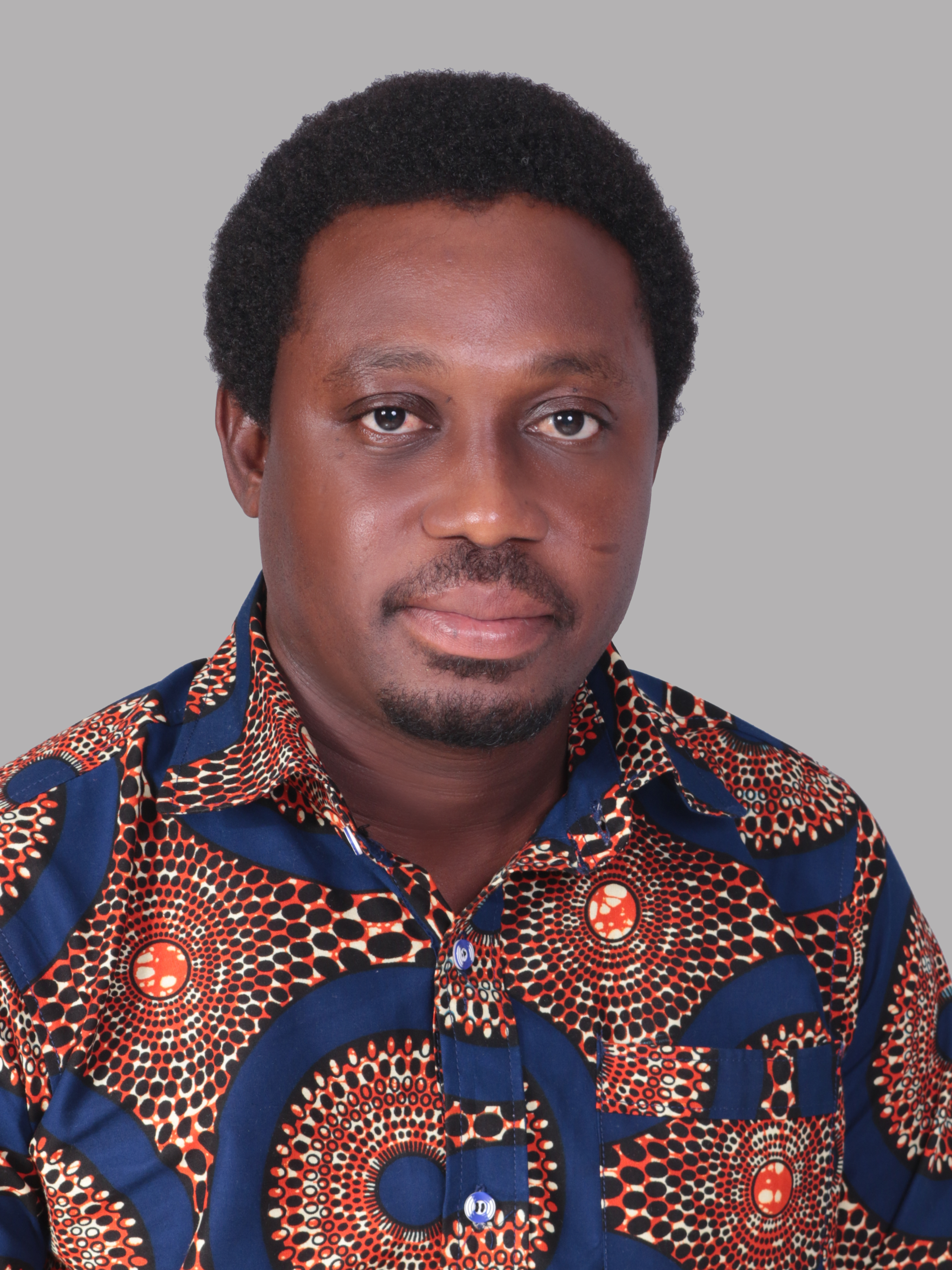

Member of the Ghana Parliament for Nadowli Kaleo
- Incumbent
- Assumed office 7 January 2021

Personal details
- Born: Anthony Mwinkaara Sumah; 17 January 1982 (age 44) Charikpong
- Party: National Democratic Congress
- Occupation: Politician
- Committees: House Committee, Communications Committee

Anthony Mwinkaara Sumah (born 17 January 1982) is a Ghanaian politician and member of the National Democratic Congress. He is the member of parliament for the Nadowli Kaleo Constituency, Upper West Region

== Early life and education ==
Mwinkaara hails from Charikpong in the Upper West Region of Ghana. He attended St. Anthony's primary school and proceeded to Tuolu Senior High School. He later gained admission to the University of Ghana, Legon, where he graduated with Bachelor of Science Degree in Health service administration.

== Personal life ==
Anthony Mwinkaara Sumah is a Christian.
