= Abdul-Rashid Pelpuo =

Ghanaian politician

The Honourable Abdul-Rashid Hassan Pelpuo
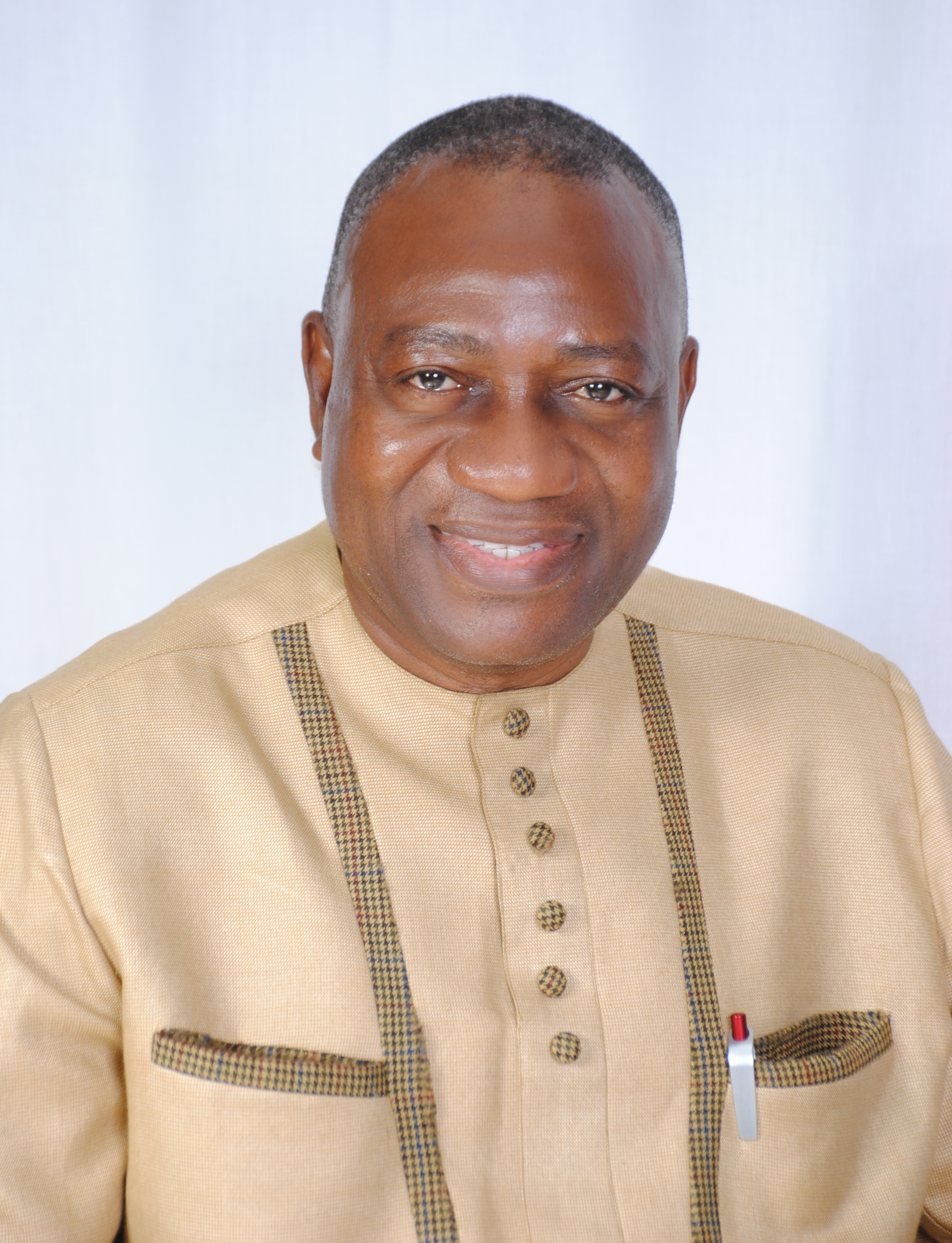

Minister for Employment and Labour Relations
- Incumbent
- Assumed office February 2025
- President: John Mahama
- Preceded by: Ignatius Baffour-Awuah

Member of the Ghana Parliament for Wa Central
- Incumbent
- Assumed office 7 January 2005
- Preceded by: Mumuni Abudu Seidu

Minister for Youth and Sports
- In office February 2009 – February 2010
- President: John Evans Atta Mills
- Preceded by: Muntaka Mohammed Mubarak
- Succeeded by: Akua Dansuah

Personal details
- Born: 5 May 1964 (age 62)
- Party: National Democratic Congress
- Education: University of Ghana
- Profession: Development Worker
- Committees: Government Assurance Committee-Ranking Member; Employment, Social Welfare and State Enterprises Committee Lands and Forestry Committee Business Committee (7th Parliament of 4th Republic of Ghana)

Abdul-Rashid Hassan Pelpuo (born 15 May 1964) is a Ghanaian politician. He is the current Member of Parliament for Wa Central constituency in the Upper West Region of Ghana.

== Early life and education ==
Pelpuo hails from Wa in the Upper West region of Ghana. He had his Middle School Leaving Certificate in 1976. He had his O level education in 1983 and his A level education in 1986. He earned a diploma in Economics in 1994 and a degree in Psychology in 1994. He also has a master's degree in International Affairs in 1998. He earned a PhD in Development Policy from the University of Ghana, African Studies in 2013.

== Career ==
Pelpuo was a consultant for the Institute of Policy Alternatives. For the National Youth Council, he was Deputy Coordinator of Finance, then its director, and then its Agricultural Ag. Regional.

== Political life ==
Pelpuo entered the Parliament of Ghana in 2005 after winning the Wa Central seat on the ticket of the National Democratic Congress in the December 2004 election.

Pelpuo was a Minister of State at the office of the President until September 2009 when President John Atta Mills moved him to the Ministry of Youth and Sports following the resignation of Muntaka Mohammed Mubarak. He served in this capacity until a cabinet reshuffle in January 2010. He was replaced by Ghana's first female Minister for Sports, Akua Dansua, and appointed deputy Majority Leader in Parliament instead. He was also nominated as one of Ghana's five Members to the Pan African Parliament in South Africa, where he served for a term until 2013.

In the John Mahama administration (2012–2016), Pelpuo was appointed Minister of State at the Office of the President in Charge of Private Sector Development and Public Private Partnership (PPP). He was also a member of the Economic Management Team (EMT). In 2016, he won his seat for another four-year term as the Member of Parliament for the Wa Central Constituency. In Parliament, Pelpuo became elected chairman of the Population and Development Caucus and Leader of the Parliamentarians for Global Action, Ghana Chapter. He also held the ranking member position on the Government Assurance Committee, an important oversight committee that monitors and holds government ministers to task for promises they make.

Pelpuo contested the 2020 elections and won a fifth term as MP. He was appointed to serve another term as Chairman of the Population and Development Caucus and Ranking Member of the Lands Committee. He is also a member of the Energy and Business Committees.

=== 2004 elections ===
Pelpuo was elected as the member of parliament of the Wa Central constituency in the 2004 Ghanaian general elections. He thus represented the constituency in the 4th parliament of the 4th republic of Ghana. He was elected with 21,272 votes out of a total 41,501 valid votes cast. This was equivalent to 51.3% of the total valid votes cast. He was elected over Mornah Anbataayela Bernard of the People's National Convention, Mohammed Adama Kpegla of the New Patriotic Party, Abu Mumuni of the Convention People's Party, Osman Mohammed of the Democratic People's Party, and Osman Imam Sidik, an independent candidate. These obtained 12,280 votes, 7,249 votes, 376 votes, 172 votes and 152 votes respectively out of the total valid votes cast. These were equivalent to 29.6%, 17.5%, 0.9%, 0.4% and 0.4% respectively of the total valid votes cast. Pelpuo was elected on the ticket of the National Democratic Congress. In all, the National Democratic Congress won a minority total of 94 parliamentary representation out of 230 seats in the 4th parliament of the 4th republic of Ghana.

== Personal life ==
Pelpuo is a Muslim.

== See also ==
- List of Mills government ministers
- Wa Central constituency
- National Democratic Congress

Parliament of Ghana
Preceded by Mumuni Abudu Seidu	Wa Central; 2005 – present	Incumbent
Political offices
Preceded by Muntaka Mohammed Mubarak	Minister for Youth and Sports; 2009 – 2010	Succeeded by Akua Dansua
