= Wechiau =

- District Capital
- Location of Wechiau in Upper West region
- Coordinates: 9°50′N 2°41′W
- Country: Ghana
- Region: Upper West Region
- District: Wa West District
- Elevation: 830 ft (253 m)

Population (2013)
  - Total: —

Wechiau is a small town and is the capital of Wa West district, a district in the Upper West Region of north Ghana adjacent to the border with Burkina Faso. Wechiau has a stretch of the Black Volta and this is the home to a wild population of Hippopotamus.

== Tourism ==
- Wechiau Community Hippo Sanctuary
