= Wa West (Ghana parliament constituency) =

Constituency in Ghana

- constituency for the Parliament of Ghana
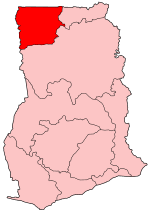
- District: Wa West District
- Region: Upper West Region of Ghana

Current constituency
- Created: 2004
- Party: National Democratic Congress
- MP: Peter Lanchene Toobu

Wa West is one of the constituencies represented in the Parliament of Ghana. It elects one Member of Parliament (MP) by the first past the post system of election. Peter Lanchene Toobu is the member of parliament for the constituency. Wa West is located in the Wa West district of the Upper West Region of Ghana.

This seat was created prior to the Ghanaian parliamentary election in 2004.

== Boundaries ==
The seat is located within the Wa West District of the Upper West Region of Ghana.

== History ==
The constituency was first created in 2004 by the Electoral Commission of Ghana along with 29 other new ones, increasing the number of constituencies from 200 to 230.

== Members of Parliament ==
Election	Member	Party
2004	Joseph Yieleh Chireh	National Democratic Congress
2020	Peter Lanchene Toobu	National Democratic Congress
2024	Peter Lanchene Toobu	National Democratic Congress

== Elections ==
2008 Ghanaian parliamentary election: Wa West Source:Ghana Home Page
Party	Candidate	Votes	%	±%
National Democratic Congress	Joseph Yieleh Chireh	10,468	50.0	—
Independent	Edward B. Yirimanbo IND	5,541	26.5	—
New Patriotic Party	Dari Daniel Kuusongno	4,455	21.3	—
People's National Convention	Iddrisu Ibrahim	243	1.2	—
Convention People's Party	Zoyaari John	241	1.2	—
Democratic People's Party	Kanda Al-Hassan	0	0.0	—
Majority		4,927	23.5	—
Turnout		—	—	—

== See also ==
- List of Ghana Parliament constituencies
