= Alex Dodoo =

Ghanaian pharmacist and academic

Director General of Ghana Standards Authority
- Incumbent
- Assumed office 2017
- President: Nana Akufo-Addo
- Preceded by: George Ben-Crentsil

Personal details
- Born: Alexander Nii Oto Dodoo Ghana
- Education: University of London
- Occupation: Academic, Pharmacist

Alexander Nii Oto Dodoo, FPSGH, FPCPHARM, MRPHARMS is a Ghanaian pharmacist and academic who has been serving as Director-General of the Ghana Standards Authority since 2017. Before this, he was a clinical pharmacologist and a professor at the Centre for Tropical Clinical Pharmacology, University of Ghana Medical School. He was also the director of the World Health Organization (WHO) Collaborating Centre for Advocacy and Training in Pharmacovigilance from October 2009 to June 2017.

== Early life and education ==
Alex Dodoo was born at Adabraka a suburb of Accra. He began schooling when he was six years old at Gray Memorial primary school, a public school located near the Adabraka market. His parents divorced when he was nine years old, and he and his mother moved to his maternal family house in Jamestown. From Gray Memorial he was sent to a private school; All Nations primary school. The school was situated in Nima also a suburb of Accra. He had his secondary education at St. John's Grammar School and his sixth form education at the Accra Academy.

In 1983, Dodoo went to Nigeria but returned after two months. On his return, he was one of the first batch of sixth formers to do National Service. After his national service he gained admission to the Kwame Nkrumah University of Science and Technology through the help of an anglican priest, Justice Akrofi. There, he studied pharmacy. He earned his master of science degree in Biopharmacy at the University of London and joined the University of Alberta, Edmonton, Canada in 1991 for a one-year research work in neuro-pharmacology and neuroscience. He returned to the University of London after his research work to pursue a doctorate degree in pharmacy at King's College, London.

== Career ==
In 2007, he was elected president of the Pharmaceutical Society of Ghana. He served in this capacity for two terms; from 2007 to 2009 and from 2009 to 2011. In 2009, Dodoo was elected President of the International Society of Pharmacovigilance (ISoP), becoming the first African to serve in that office, he held that office until 2012.

In 2013 he was appointed Chief Executive Officer for the John Agyekum Kufour Foundation by Ghana's former president; John Agyekum Kufuor.

Prior to his appointment as the executive director of the Ghana Standards Authority, he was an associate professor of clinical pharmacology at the University of Ghana Medical School. He has served on various local and foreign boards, some of which include; the Pharmacy Practice board of the International Pharmaceutical Federation, Global Advisory Committee on Vaccine Safety, Safety Surveillance Working Group of the Bill and Melinda Gates Foundation, Enteric and Diarrhoeal Diseases Advisory Group also under the Bill and Melinda Gates Foundation and CIOMS/WHO Working Group on Drug Development in Resource Poor Countries. He has also served as a chairperson for the Ghana Food and Drugs Authority.

He is a fellow of the Ghana College of Pharmacists, Pharmaceutical Society of Ghana, West African Postgraduate College of Pharmacy, a Registered Pharmacist with the General Pharmaceutical Council of the United Kingdom and also a member of the Royal Pharmaceutical Society of Great Britain.

== Appointment ==
He was appointed Director General of the Ghana Standards Authority by Nana Akufo-Addo, president of the republic of Ghana. He assumed office in June, 2017.

== Publications ==
Dodoo has authored and co-authored many manuscripts and full papers in peer-reviewed journals. He published a book in 2010 titled: Healthy Secrets: A Layperson's Guide to Health Issues, 2010. The book has undergone three reprints. He is also a columnist for the Spectator newspaper.

== Personal life ==
He is married to an appeal court judge and together, they have three children.

== See also ==
- Pharmaceutical Society of Ghana
- List of Akufo-Addo government ministers and political appointees
