= Charia, Ghana =

Town in Ghana

Coordinates: 10°06′N 2°34′W

Charia is a small town located in the Wa Municipal District, about five kilometres northwest of Wa, the capital of the Upper West Region of Ghana. It has about ten thousand inhabitants. The population comprises a mix of Christians, Muslims and Traditionalists. The major economic activities of the town are; farming, pottery, commerce. Since the country attained independence in 1957, the town has produced two District Commissioners for the Wa District (one in the Kwame Nkrumah Regime and another during the John Evans Atta Mills presidency). It has also produced a Deputy Minister under the John Agyekum Kufour administration.

Charia is known for its pottery which it makes from the clay found in the area.
