= Wechiau Community Hippo Sanctuary =

Tourism attraction project in Wechiau, Ghana

The Wechiau Community Hippo Sanctuary is a community-led tourism attraction project located at Wechiau in the Upper West Region of Ghana. The Black Volta River, along which the Sanctuary is situated, contains one of only two remaining hippopotamus populations left in Ghana. The Sanctuary is supported by the Wilder Institute. the sanctuary combine habitat monitoring, inclusive governance support, and livelihood development to ensure that protecting the hippos creates tangible, lasting benefits for twenty communities in the sanctuary. The river is home to one of the two remaining hippopotamus populations in Ghana and was created into a Sanctuary by local chiefs in 1999. Since then, the project has had marked success in providing Ghanaian and International tourists with a unique and unusual eco-travel experience.

== About the hippopotamus ==
Hippopotamuses are among the world’s most ecologically powerful animals. By moving between water and land, they quietly shape Africa’s river ecosystems.

Hippos are an iconic and important part of their ecosystem, helping to regulate both aquatic and terrestrial habitats. Although biodiversity monitoring indicates that the hippo population is increasing, there’s still more work to be done.

The area has much to offer, both due to the huge diversity of wildlife and the opportunities to become immersed in the local culture and activities.

== Key threat of hippopotamus to the environment ==
Habitat loss, degradation and human-wildlife conflict, compounded by illegal hunting and illegal mining activities in the water bodies along the Black Volta. Climate Change leading to rising temperatures and changes in rainfall patterns also affect vegetation growth and water availability. Human encroachment to protected areas for farmland.

=== Hippopotamus Fun Facts ===
Did you know the following facts about hippos?

- The name "Hippopotamus" literally means "river horse" from the Greek term's "hippos", meaning "horse" and "potamus", meaning "river"... but there is very little horse-like about the animal.
- Despite their intimidating size and teeth, hippos are herbivores. They spend a greater part of the night grazing. During the day, they rest by gently wallowing in the river and sometimes sleeping in the water with their head on a rock.
- Groups of hippos are referred to as "schools."
- Each school consists of a group of females and bachelors under the control of a territorial bull that is easily recognized from its confident and aggressive behaviour.
- Despite its enormous size and disproportionately short legs, the hippo can run at fast speed on land. It would be futile for a human to try to outpace one that was in an aggressive mood.
- Though they spend a lot of time in water, hippos are rather bad swimmers. When in deep water they progress by a series of porpoise-like leaps off the bottom in a curiously graceful manner reminiscent of an overweight ballet dancer filmed in slow motion.
- Hippos follow regular paths to graze, and over time distinct trails are formed. These paths may be so eroded by generations of hippo feet that they become almost like trenches.
