= Pharmaceutical Society of Ghana =

Professional society in Ghana

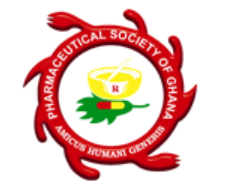
Logo of the Pharmaceutical Society of Ghana

The Pharmaceutical Society of Ghana was founded on December 19, 1935, out of the former Gold Coast Pharmacists and Druggists Union and the Chemists Defense Association which had existed before 1929. The society was founded by a group of pharmacists led by William Ayiah Hansen, Hansdrug College of Pharmacy, Hansdrug Hall, Accra. He did so with the support of Dr. D. Duff, then the director of medical services. William Ayiah Hansen was then the organizing secretary and registrar of the society. Before 1935, the predominant pharmacist groups in Ghana were two associations. Pharmacists affiliated themselves to these groups according to their bonding or non-bonding to government service. The private pharmacists groups were led by William Ayiah Hansen.

== Chapters ==
The society has branches in all the Regions of Ghana except the Northern and Upper Regions which form one Branch. There are Hospital, General Practice and Industrial, Pharmacists Associations. The Ghana Pharmaceutical Students Association is affiliated to the society.

=== Practice and interest groups ===
- Community Practice Pharmacists' Association – CPPA
- Industrial Pharmacists' Association – IPA
- Social and Academic Pharmacists' Association – SAPA
- Government and Hospital Pharmacists' Association – GHOSPA
- Associations of Representatives of Ethical Pharmaceutical Industries – AREPI
- Lady Pharmacists Association of Ghana – LAPAG

== Statutory roles ==
The society is tasked with the following:

- Promote a unified front among pharmacists in Ghana generally, and to secure the observance of high standards of professional conduct as will uphold the dignity of the profession of pharmacy
- Regulate the training of individuals desiring to become pharmacists, and to encourage the pursuit of research activities connected with the progress of pharmaceutical knowledge
- Disseminate scientific and professional information by means of lectures, symposia, seminars, the publication of the Society's Journal, and by whatever means available to the society within the laws of Ghana
- Encourage the exchange of ideas on and discussion of subjects of common interests to its members
- Co-operate with other pharmaceutical bodies outside Ghana with the aim of upholding high standards and dignity of the profession of pharmacy worldwide
- Organize meetings or other functions that will promote a good social intercourse among its members
- Place at the disposal of the Government and the general public the benefit of pharmaceutical expertise in keeping with the Society's motto: "Amicus Humani Generis”
- Collaborate with the government and all or any other agencies or bodies in Ghana to ensure that pharmaceutical services comparable to the best in the world is available to the people of Ghana
- Perform all other functions within the framework of the laws of Ghana, as may be found necessary for the achievement and realization of the foregoing objects or part hereof

== Logo ==
The idea of a crest for the society was proposed in 1962 but it was not until February 1971 when a design was ordered. The crest as it is today was accepted as the symbol of the society on August 5, 1972.

=== Significance ===
- An outer ring, the Adinkra design; Obi nka obi (Peace and Harmony) which is in conformity with the society's motto (Amicus Humani Generis)
- Mortar and pestle with the recipe sign superimposed on the mortar representing the basic international designation of the pharmacy profession.
- Cluster of green leaves at the base of the mortar with a capsule superimposed on the leaves. The cluster of leaves represents the old and traditional concept of Pharmacy and denotes the numerous medicinal plants that abound in Ghana
- The superimposed capsule indicates the changing role of pharmacy from plant source to synthetic products. It also shows that pharmacists can extract the active principles from plants, formulate and dispense them in acceptable dosage forms

== Membership ==
By virtue of Section 9, Act 64 of Ghana, every person registered as a pharmacist in Ghana automatically becomes a member of the society. Membership had until the promulgation of Act 64 of Ghana been optional. At its inception, membership was twenty six. In 1961 after the passage of Act 64, a new register opened. Membership then increased significantly to nearly four hundred and twenty. By December 1984, the number of pharmacists registered had reached eight hundred and five. Membership certificates were introduced in 1972 and have been available since then. The designation of membership is MPSGH. Associate membership is open to persons who have obtained their recognizable academic qualifications and are undergoing their registration process or pursuing postgraduate studies.

== The National Council of the Society (governing body) ==
The body responsible for the day-to-day management of the affairs of the society. Consists of the following member:

=== Standing executive committee ===
Consists of members elected by the society at a biennial conference, alongside the president, vice-president, the national treasurer, the general secretary, the assistant general secretary, the editor of the Pharmaceutical Journal and two others.

=== Ministerial nomination ===
Two members nominated by the minister of health (Ghana) under Section 9 (5) of Act 64. The director of pharmaceutical services and the dean of the Faculty of Pharmacy, Kwame Nkrumah University of Science and Technology (KNUST), Kumasi, Ghana.

=== Elected branch representatives ===
Two from Greater Accra Region, one each from Eastern, Central, Western, Ashanti, Brong-Ahafo, Volta Regions and one from Northern and Upper East/Upper West Regions which form one Branch.

=== Other ===
The immediate past president of the Society.

== The National Secretariat ==
This is the head office of the society and the seat of the current president and governing body. It was initially located at Selwyn Market Street, Accra. In 1956, a new office with a physical address was inaugurated at Knustford Avenue, near the Timber Market, Accra. Since 1972 the Secretariat has been moved four times. Now it is within the Social Advance Institute building near the Greater Accra Regional Administration. On July 17, 1966, a collective decision was made to build a National Headquarters with the help of a fund launched by General Emmanuel Kwasi Kotoka. A Building committee was set-up by Council but unfortunately up to date, the building has not taken off. The Secretariat is currently being run by the general secretary, his assistant and aided by four staff members led by an administrative secretary.

== Fellowship in the Society ==
=== Early Honorees ===
Five members had distinguished themselves in the service of the society and practice of the pharmacy profession in Ghana

- Samuel Benson Adjepong, 1914–1984, a product of Chelsea College, first director of Pharmacy of the Ministry of Health in Ghana
- Samuel Addotey Allotey, 1913–1984, became a member in 1941, was treasurer 1954–1963, general secretary 1963–1971 of the society, and served on the Pharmacy Board for 12 years
- James Ebenezer Kwasi Djan, 1918–1982, became a member in 1952, and soon the vice-chairman, Accra Branch and Treasurer of the Society 1968–1971
- Bernard Eugene Dua Ofori-Atta, 1919–1976, became a member in 1940, was vice-president 1952–1966 and president 1966–1971
- Albert Nii Tackie, a product of Korle-Bu and Chelsea College, appointed professor and head of Department of Chemistry, Faculty of Pharmacy and Pharmaceutical Sciences, KNUST, Kumasi, 1964 and later the dean of the faculty, a post he held until 1975 when he became the executive chairman, Council for Scientific and Industrial Research (CSIR). He is a fellow of the Pharmaceutical Society of Great Britain and a Chartered Chemist. He was a member of council from 1957 to 1973.

=== Current Fellows ===
The society now has eighteen Fellows, including two members of the Pharmaceutical Society of Great Britain

== Presidents ==
- William Ayiah Hansen – 1935
- J. E. Brown – 1935
- Johnny Amarteifio – 1942
- Johnny Hansen – 1944
- G. O. Jones–Quartey – 1948
- J. A. K. Quarshie – 1956
- E. K. Bensah – 1961
- B. E.D Ofori–Attah – 1965
- Victor Aidoo – 1971
- Kwame Sarpong – 1974
- Ago Simmonds – 1975
- James Pearce–Biney – 1981
- K. A. Ohene–Manu – 1983
- E. O. Gyamfi – 1987
- K. Boakye–Yiadom – 1989
- David Anim–Addo – 1993
- Dela Ashiabor – 1997
- John Arthur – 1999
- Oscar Bruce – 2001
- Frank Boateng – 2003
- Alex Dodoo – 2007
- James Ohemeng Kyei – 2011
- Thomas Boateng Appiagyei – 2015
- Benjamin K. Botwe – 2017
- Samuel Kow Donkoh — 2021
- Paul Owusu Donkor,PhD — 2025

== Affiliations ==
=== West African Pharmaceutical Federation (WAPF) ===
Founding member

=== International Pharmaceutical Federation (FIP) ===
Member since 1962

=== African Pharmaceutical Forum ===
Member of African Pharmaceutical Forum

=== West African Postgraduate College of Pharmacists ===
Member of West African Postgraduate College of Pharmacists

=== Commonwealth Pharmaceutical Association ===
Founding member of the Commonwealth Pharmaceutical Association

=== Association of Recognized Professional Bodies ===
Founding and active member of the Association of Recognized Professional Bodies

== Representation ==
The society is represented on several government committees concerned with Drugs and Health Administration in Ghana.

- Pharmacy Council Ghana
- Centre for Scientific Research into Plant Medicine
- National Health Insurance Council
- Drug Classification Committee of the Food and Drugs Board of Ghana
- National Population Council
- Ministry of Health (Ghana)
- National Health Insurance Scheme (Ghana) Medicines Expert Panel

== Collaborating Agencies ==
- Royal Pharmaceutical Society of Great Britain (RPSGB)
- World Health Organization (WHO)
- West African Project to Combat AIDS (WAPCA)
- Ministry of Health (Ghana) (MOH)
- Faculty of Pharmacy and Pharmaceutical Sciences
- Ghana Pharmaceutical Students Association (GPSA)
- Ghana Aids Commission (GAC)
- DANIDA
- National Health Insurance Secretariat
- Ghana National Drugs Programme
- Malaria Control Programme
- Narcotics Control Board
- Ghana National Chemical Sellers Association
- Food and Drugs Authority
- Pharmacy Council Ghana
