= Mumuni Abudu Seidu =

Ghanaian politician

Alhaji Mumuni Abudu Seidu

Member of Parliament for Wa Central, Upper West Region, Ghana
- In office 7 January 1993 – 6 January 2005
- Preceded by: Constituency merged
- Succeeded by: Abdul-Rashid Pelpuo

Minister of State without portfolio

Personal details
- Party: National Democratic Congress
- Education: Aggrey Memorial A.M.E. Zion Senior High School
- Alma mater: Wesley College, Kumasi; University of Ghana; University of Cape Coast

Alhaji Mumuni Abudu Seidu is a Ghanaian politician and a former Minister of State without portfolio. From 7 January 1993 to 6 January 2005, Seidu served as the Member of Parliament for Wa Central in the Upper West Region of Ghana.

== Early life and education ==
Seidu was born in Wa in the Upper West Region of Ghana. He had his secondary education at the A. M. E. Zion Secondary School in Cape Coast. He continued at Wesley College, Kumasi, where he received his Teachers' Training Certificate (Certificate A), and later obtained his Bachelor of Arts degree from University of Ghana. He then proceeded to pursue his Post Graduate Studies at the University of Cape Coast where he obtained his Post Graduate Certificate in Education.

== Career ==
Prior to entering politics, Seidu was an educationist and a manager. He was a tutor, headmaster, and once served as a director of education. He was also a proprietor of a private school and the managing director of a construction firm.

== Politics ==
=== 1992 Elections ===
Seidu assumed office as a member of the first parliament of the fourth republic of Ghana in January 1993, after he was pronounced winner at the 1992 Ghanaian parliamentary election held on 29 December 1992.

=== 1996 Elections ===
Seidu entered parliament on 7 January 1997 after he emerged winner at the 1996 Ghanaian general election having defeated Eiedi Clement N. Lugri of the New Patriotic Party and Sulemana Alhassan of the People's National Convention. He obtained 44.80% of the total valid votes cast which is equivalent to 25,718 votes while his opponents obtained 20.30% which is equivalent to 11,657 votes, and 10.70% which is equivalent to 6,150 votes respectively.

=== 2000 Elections ===
Seidu was elected as the member of parliament for the Wa Central constituency in the Upper West region of Ghana in the 2000 Ghanaian general elections. He therefore represented the constituency in the 3rd parliament of the 4th republic of Ghana.

He was elected with 14,278 votes out of the total valid votes cast. This was equivalent to 55.40% of the total valid votes cast. He was elected over Godfrey Tangu Bayon of the New Patriotic Party, Albert Solomon Bawa Sulley of the People's National Convention and Abu Olivia Habiba of the Convention People's Party.These obtained 6,027, 4,485 and 1,005 votes respectively of the total valid votes cast. These were equivalent to 23.40%, 17.40% and 3.90% respectively of the total valid votes cast. He was elected on the ticket of the National Democratic Congress. The National Democratic Congress won a total of 7 parliamentary seats in the Upper West Region in that elections.

In all, the party won a minority total of 89 parliamentary seats out of 200 seats in the 3rd parliament of the 4th republic of Ghana.

== Personal life ==
He is a Muslim.
