= Puozaa Mathias Asuma =

Ghanaian politician

Hon. Puozaa Mathias Asuma

Member of the Ghana Parliament for Daffiama/Bussie/Issa
- In office 7 January 2005 – 6 January 2017

Personal details
- Party: National Democratic Congress
- Education: University of Edinburgh

Puozaa Mathias Asuma was a Ghanaian politician and member of the 6th Parliament of the 4th Republic of Ghana representing Daffiama/Bussie/Issa constituency of Upper West Region of Ghana.

== Early life and education ==
Asuma was born on 10 January 1948. He is an indegene of Tuori-Daffiama, a town in the Upper West Region of Ghana. He was an alumnus of University of Edinburgh, Scotland where he obtained his Master of Science degree in Community Education.

== Personal life ==
Asuma was married with five children. He is a Catholic Christian.

== Career and politics ==
Puozaa was an educationist. He started his career as a lecturer at the prestigious University of Ghana Legon, Accra before he became a member of the parliament. He was first elected into office in the 2004 Ghanaian General Elections and became member of the Parliament in January 2005 with the ticket of the National Democratic Congress. He had a run of 3 terms in office afterwards and left office in January 2017. While in parliament, he was the Chairman of the Parliamentary Select Committee on Education.
