= Sebastian Ngmenenso Sandaare =

Ghanaian politician (1974)

Hon Sebastian Ngmenenso Sandaare
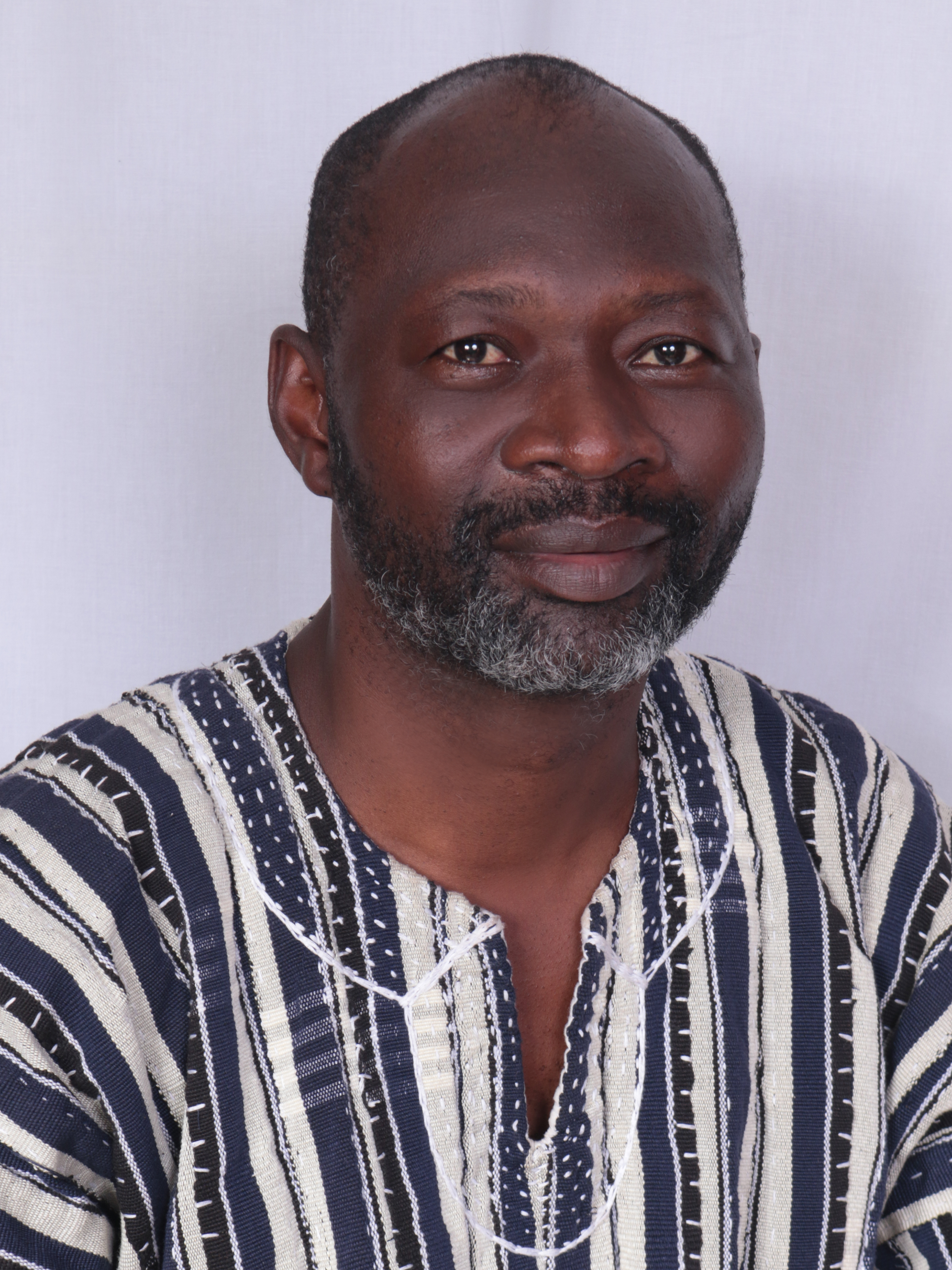

Member of the Ghana Parliament for Daffiama-Bussie-Issa Constituency
- Incumbent
- Assumed office 7 January 2021

Personal details
- Born: Sebastian Ngmenenso Sandaare; 1 January 1974 (age 52) Daffiama, Ghana
- Party: National Democratic Congress
- Education: Kwame Nkrumah University of Science and Technology; University of Ghana
- Occupation: Politician
- Committees: Subsidiary Legislation Committee, Health Committee

Sebastian Ngmenenso Sandaare (born 1 January 1974) is a Ghanaian politician and member of the Seventh Parliament of the Fourth Republic of Ghana representing the Daffiama-Bussie-Issa Constituency in the Upper West Region on the ticket of the National Democratic Congress.

== Early life and education ==
Sandaare was born on 1 January 1974, in Daffiama, Upper West Region. He holds a bachelor's degree from Kwame Nkrumah University of Science and Technology and a master's degree in Public Health from the University of Ghana.

== Politics ==
Sandaare is a member of the National Democratic Congress and represented the Daffiama-Bussie Issa constituency in the Seventh and Eighth Parliament of the Fourth Republic of Ghana.

=== 2016 election ===
Sandaare contested the Daffiama- Bussie Issa constituency parliamentary seat on the ticket of National Democratic Congress during the 2016 Ghanaian general election and won with 8, 569 votes representing 63.93% of the total votes. He was elected over Lwanga Saanyeh Bagonluri of New Patriotic Party who pulled 4, 776 votes which is equivalent to 35.63% and the parliamentary candidate for APC Dunee Lwanga had 59 votes representing 0.44% of the total votes.

==== 2020 election ====
Sandaare was re-elected as a member of parliament for Daffiama-Bussie Issa (Ghana parliament constituency) on the ticket of the National Democratic Congress during the 2020 Ghanaian general election. He was elected with 10,543 votes representing 56.50% over the parliamentary candidate for the New Patriotic Party Nadi Imoro Sanda who pulled 8, 116 votes, which is equivalent to 43.50% of the total votes.
