= Nadowli-Kaleo District =

- District
- Districts of Upper West Region

- Location of Nadowli-Kaleo District within Upper West
- Coordinates: 10°22′26″N 2°40′26″W
- Country: Ghana
- Region: Upper West
- Capital: Nadowli

Area
  - Total: 2,594 km^{2} (1,002 sq mi)

Population (2021)
  - Total: 77,057
- Time zone: UTC+0 (GMT)
- ISO 3166 code: GH-UW-NK

Nadowli-Kaleo District is one of the eleven districts in Upper West Region, Ghana. Originally it was formerly part of the then-larger Nadowli District in 1988; until the eastern part of the district were later split off to create Daffiama-Bussie-Issa District on 28 June 2012; thus the remaining part has been renamed as Nadowli-Kaleo District. The district assembly is located in the northeast part of Upper West Region and has Nadowli as its capital town.

== Economy ==
Agriculture is the most important economic sector of Nadowli District, accounting for about 85% of the labor force. The commercial and industrial sectors are less developed.
