= Nadowli East (Ghana parliament constituency) =

Constituency in Ghana

- constituency for the Parliament of Ghana
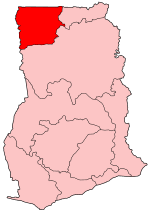
- District: Nadowli District
- Region: Upper West Region of Ghana

Current constituency
- Created: 2004
- Party: National Democratic Congress
- MP: Mathias Asoma Puozaa

Nadowli East is one of the constituencies represented in the Parliament of Ghana. It elects one Member of Parliament (MP) by the first past the post system of election. Nadowli East is located in the Nadowli district of the Upper West Region of Ghana.

== Boundaries ==
The seat is located within the Nadowli District of the Upper West Region of Ghana.

== History ==
This seat came into being prior to the Ghanaian parliamentary election in 2004. This followed the altering of the Nadawli North and Nadawli South constituencies to the Nadawli East and Nadowli West constituencies respectively.

== Members of Parliament ==
Election	Member	Party
2004	Mathias Asoma Puozaa Mathias Asoma Puozaa hails from Touri also in his constituency. Born on 10 January 1948, he was educated at the Daffiamma Roman Catholic School, St. Charles Secondary School, University of Ghana and the University of Glasgow. He worked with the Institute of Adult Education (University of Ghana) until he was elected MP in 2004. He retained the seat in the 2008 general elections. He is the Chairman of the Parliamentary Select Committee on Education. Mr. Puozaa is married to Leonicia Bataanie with five children.	National Democratic Congress

== Elections ==
2008 Ghanaian parliamentary election:Nadowli East Source:Ghana Home Page
Party	Candidate	Votes	%	±%
National Democratic Congress	Mathias Asoma Puozaa	4,789	49.4	—
New Patriotic Party	Robert Ekor Dassh	4,676	48.2	—
People's National Convention	Jonas Banoebara Tingani	165	1.7	—
Convention People's Party	George Tiesaah Azaadong	66	0.7	—
Majority		113	1.2	—
Turnout		—	—	—

== See also ==
- List of Ghana Parliament constituencies
