= Nadowli =

- District Capital
- Location of Nadowli in Upper West region
- Coordinates: 10°22′N 2°39′W
- Country: Ghana
- Region: Upper West Region
- District: Nadowli District
- Elevation: 925 ft (282 m)

Population (2013)
  - Total: —

Nadowli is a small town and is the capital of Nadowli district, a district in the Upper West Region of north Ghana.

Other well-known cities around Nadowli are Tangasia, which has the most popular market in the district and Cherekpong.
