= Issa, Ghana =

District Capital in Upper West Region, Ghana

Issa
- District Capital
- Location in Ghana
- Coordinates: 10°23′32″N 2°19′57″W
- Country: Ghana
- Region: Upper West Region
- District: Daffiama Bussie Issa
- Elevation: 303 m (994 ft)
- Time zone: GMT
  - Summer (DST): GMT
- Area codes: for multiple area codes

Issa is the capital of the Daffiama Bussie Issa district in the Upper West Region of Ghana. It became the capital after the district was established in 2012.

== Location ==
Issa is at an elevation of 303 metres above sea level. Its neighbours include Samambaw to the north, Kojoperi to the east, Tabeasi to the south and Wogu to the west. The nearest airports are the Wa Airport and the Tamale Airport in the Northern Region.

== Gbele Game Reserve ==
Issa is located on the southern border of the Gbele Resource Centre and bird sanctuary. It is home to various endangered wildlife species as well as buffalo, hippopotamus, elephant, bushbuck and roan antelope.
