= Pharmacy Council Ghana =

Statutory regulatory body in Ghana

The Ghana Pharmacy Council is a statutory regulatory body established by an Act of Parliament of Ghana, the pharmacy Act, 1994(Act 489)Part IV of The Health Professions Regulatory Bodies Act, 2013 (Act 857). It is located in Accra, the capital of Ghana.Its core function is to secure public interest in the highest standards in the practice of pharmacy

== Vision and Mission of the council. ==
The Vision of the Council is “To guarantee the highest levels of pharmaceutical care”. The Council’s Mission is “To secure the highest level of pharmaceutical care by ensuring competent pharmaceutical care providers who practice within agreed standards and are accessible to the whole population. In addition we shall collaborate with related local agencies and international pharmaceutical organizations to enhance our effectiveness and our contribution to rational drug use in the nation. This mission shall be carried out with dedication, integrity, and professionalism.”

== Core Values ==
Dedication, Integrity and Professionalism.
