= Alban Bagbin =

Ghanaian politician, lawyer and 7th Speaker of the fourth Republic of Ghana

The Right Honourable Alban Bagbin MP
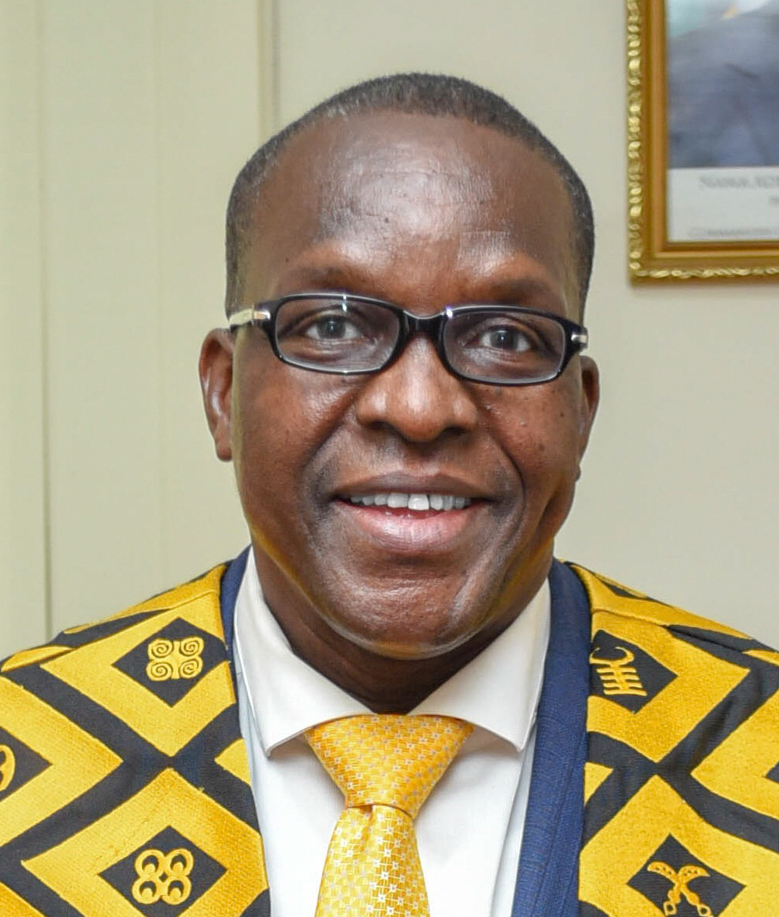
- Bagbin in 2021

Speaker of the Parliament of Ghana (8th & 9th Speaker of the Fourth Republic)
- Incumbent
- Assumed office 7 January 2021
- Preceded by: Aaron Mike Oquaye

Member of the Ghanaian Parliament for Nadowli West Constituency
- In office 7 January 2005 – 6 January 2021
- Preceded by: New constituency
- Succeeded by: Sumah Anthony Mwinikaara

Member of the Ghanaian Parliament for Nadowli North Constituency
- In office 7 January 1993 – 6 January 2005
- Preceded by: New constituency
- Succeeded by: Constituency changed

Second Deputy Speaker of Parliament
- In office 7 January 2017 – 6 January 2021
- Preceded by: Joe Ghartey
- Succeeded by: Andrew Asiamah Amoako

Majority Leader in Parliament
- In office July 2014 – January 2017
- Preceded by: Benjamin Kumbuor
- Succeeded by: Osei Kyei-Mensah-Bonsu
- In office January 2009 – January 2010
- Preceded by: Abraham Ossei Aidooh
- Succeeded by: Cletus Avoka

Minister for Health
- In office 26 January 2012 – 6 January 2013
- President: John Atta Mills
- Preceded by: Joseph Yieleh Chireh
- Succeeded by: Hanny-Sherry Ayitey

Minister for Water Resources, Works and Housing
- In office 10 January 2010 – 26 January 2012
- President: John Atta Mills
- Preceded by: Albert Abongo
- Succeeded by: E. T. Mensah

Minority Leader in Parliament
- In office January 2001 – January 2009
- Preceded by: J. H. Mensah
- Succeeded by: Osei Kyei-Mensah-Bonsu

Personal details
- Born: 24 September 1957 (age 68) Sombo, Ghana
- Party: National Democratic Congress
- Education: University of Ghana; Ghana School of Law; Ghana Institute of Management and Public Administration
- Profession: Lawyer

Alban Sumana Kingsford Bagbin (born 24 September 1957) is a Ghanaian politician who is the current Speaker of the Parliament of Ghana. He was the Minister for Health in the Ghana government from January 2012 until February 2013. He served as the Member of Parliament for Nadowli West constituency in the Upper West Region of Ghana in the 1st, 2nd, 3rd, 4th, 5th, 6th and 7th parliaments of the 4th republic of Ghana. He contested for the presidential candidate slot of the National Democratic Congress in 2019, but lost to former President John Dramani Mahama. On 7 January 2021, Bagbin was elected Speaker of 8th Parliament of the Fourth Republic.

== Early life and education ==
Alban Sumana Kingsford Bagbin was born on 24 September 1957 to Sansunni Bagbin and Margaret B. Bagbin who were both peasant farmers. He is the fourth child of nine children. He is a member of the Dagaaba ethnic group. He hails from Sombo, Upper West Region of Ghana. Alban Bagbin was educated at the Wa Secondary School and Tamale Secondary School. He obtained a Bachelor of Arts degree in Law and English at the University of Ghana in 1980.

He proceeded to the Ghana School of Law at Makola in Accra after which he was called to the bar in 1982. Bagbin also earned an Executive Masters in Governance and Leadership from the Ghana Institute of Management and Public Administration (GIMPA).

== Career ==
Bagbin worked as the acting Secretary to the Statistical Service Board at the Bureau of Statistics and Statistical Service from 1980 to 1982. He worked as Personnel Manager of the erstwhile State Hotels Corporation consisting of Ambassador and Continental Hotels between 1982 and 1983, before relocating to Libya to teach English in Tripoli at the Suk Juma Secondary School.

Following Bagbin's return to Ghana in 1986, he joined Akyem Chambers, a law firm of legal practitioners, consultants and notaries public. As an attorney, eventually rising to become a partner. Whilst working at Okyeman Chambers, between 1989 and 1992, he was appointed as the external solicitor of the Nii Ngleshie royal family of James Town, Credit Unions Association of Ghana (CUA) and several other private business firms within Accra.

After working at Okyeman Chambers for 7 years, he moved from there in 1993 and to date is a partner of the Law Trust company, a legal firm of law practitioners, consultants and notaries public.

== Political life ==
Bagbin is a member of the National Democratic Congress (NDC). He was first elected into Parliament during the 1992 Ghanaian General Elections. He represented the Nadowli West Constituency in the Upper West Region. In 2006, Bagbin announced his intentions to run for president in 2008 on the NDC ticket, but he never stood for the primaries. He became the Majority Leader in the Ghanaian parliament in 2009.

Following a cabinet reshuffle in January 2010, he was appointed Minister for Water Resources, Works and Housing by President Mills. He was also the Majority Leader of Parliament under President Mahama's tenure of office, he succeeded Benjamin Kunbuor, who was appointed as the Minister of Defense. He also served as the Second Deputy Speaker of Parliament from January 2017 to January 2021.

=== Member of Parliament ===
1996 Elections

In 1996, Bagbin won the Nadowli North seat with 12,605 votes out of the 16,485 valid votes cast, representing 76.46% over Lawrence Banyen of the New Patriotic Party (NPP) who polled 2,213 votes representing 13.42%, Yuoni Moses Vaalandzeri of the People's National Convention(PNC) polled 1,490 votes representing 9.04% and Baslide Kpemaal of the NCP polled 177 votes representing 1.07%.

2000 Elections

In the 2000 Ghanaian elections, Bagbin was retained his seat as the member of parliament for the Nadwoli North constituency. He won the elections with 9,004 votes out of the total votes cast, equivalent to 58.60% over Dr. Anleu-Mwine D.B, an independent candidate, Clement Kanfuri Senchi of the Peoples National Congress, Ningkpeng Pauline of the New Patriotic Party, John Bayon Boniface Wetol, Domayele Marcel Aston of the National Reform Party of the United Ghana Movement Party who obtained, 2,089 votes, 718 votes, 145 votes and 0 votes respectively.

2004 Elections

In 2004, ahead of the elections, Nadwoli North was split into two constituencies, Nadwoli West and Nadwoli East constituency. Bagbin was elected as the member of parliament for the Nadowli West constituency during 2004 elections. He was elected with 11,296 votes out of 22,349 total valid votes cast equivalent to 50.5%. He was elected over Clement K. Senchi of the PNC, Daniel Anleu-Mwine Baga of the NPP, Sasuu Bernard Kabawunu of the Convention People's Party, Bisung Edward of the Democratic People's Party and Dapilaa Ishak an independent candidate. who obtained 625 votes, 5,297 votes, 152 votes, 188 votes, 4,791 votes respectively.

=== Speaker of Parliament ===
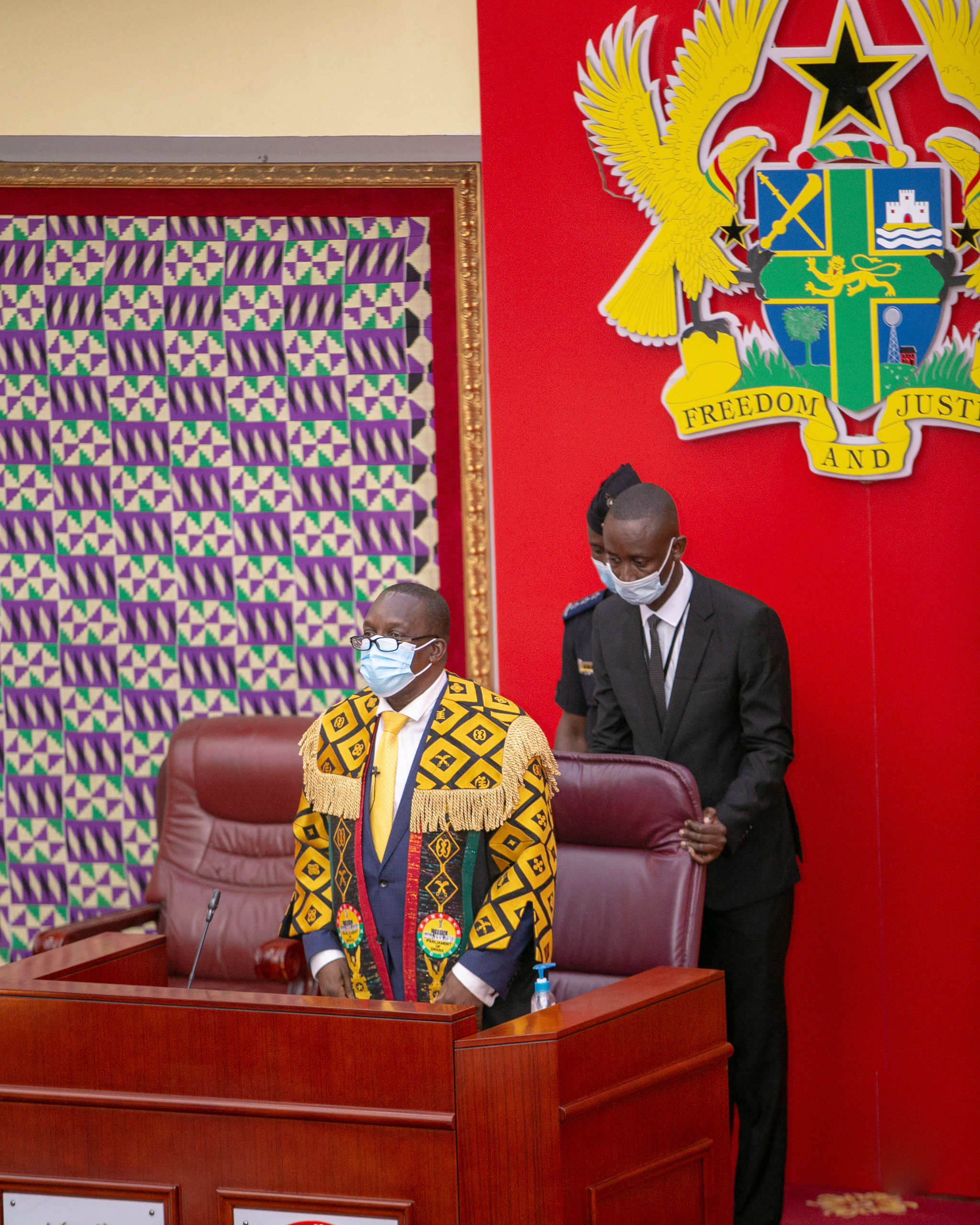
Bagbin as Speaker of Parliament in 2021

On 7 January 2021, Bagbin was elected and sworn in as the Speaker of Parliament of Ghana. He was nominated by the Members of Parliament on the ticket of the National Democratic Congress and defeated the incumbent, Mike Oquaye, who was nominated by the New Patriotic Party for the position. This marked a historic milestone in the country’s democratic journey. Bagbin’s election was notable as he became the first Speaker of Parliament chosen from the opposition party in Ghana’s history.

His victory occurred in a closely contested parliament where the NPP held a slim majority. Analysts viewed his election as a shift in the balance of power within the legislature, potentially influencing parliamentary proceedings.

In October 2024, Bagbin declared four seats held by MPs who switched parties vacant, saying that the Constitution of Ghana prohibited party-switching. The decision effectively gave the opposition National Democratic Congress a majority in the legislature and prompted a legal challenge in the Supreme Court of Ghana from Alexander Kwamina Afenyo-Markin. The court then ordered Bagbin to suspend his decision while it deliberated on the petition. On Tuesday 12 November 2024, the supreme court of Ghana reverse the decision made by the Speaker of parliament after the Supreme Court interpreted Article 97(1) (g) and (h) of the Constitution to mean that an MP vacates his seat only during a term of Parliament, and not during a future Parliament.

On 7 January 2025, Bagbin was re-elected to serve as the speaker of the parliament for the 9th Parliament of the Fourth Republic of Ghana.

== Personal life ==
Bagbin is married to Alice Adjua Yornas Bagbin, who is a Programme Officer of the UNICEF Office in Ghana. He is a Christian and worships as a Roman Catholic.

== Human Sexual Rights and Family Values Bill ==
In May 2026, Bagbin directed the parliamentary committee handling the Human Sexual Rights and Family Values Bill, 2025, to present its report for consideration before the end of the current parliamentary meeting. He stated that the bill remained a matter of significant public interest and acknowledged concerns over delays in its passage. Bagbin also noted that stakeholder consultations and public hearings on the bill had been completed. The bill, popularly known as the anti-LGBTQ+ bill, has received support from some religious and traditional groups while facing criticism from human rights organisations and some international bodies.

Parliament of Ghana
New constituency	MP for Nadowli North; 1993 – 2005	Succeeded by Constituency changed
New constituency	Member of Parliament for Nadowli West; 2005 – 2021	Succeeded by Sumah Anthony Mwinikaara
Political offices
Unknown	Minority Leader; 2005 – 2009	Succeeded by John Tia
Preceded by Felix Owusu-Adjapong	Majority Leader; 2009 – 2010	Succeeded by Cletus Avoka
Preceded by Albert Abongo	Minister for Water Resources, Works and Housing; 2010 – 2012	Succeeded by Enoch Teye Mensah
Preceded by Joseph Yieleh Chireh	Minister for Health; 2012 – 2014	Succeeded by Sherry Ayitey
Preceded by Aaron Mike Oquaye	Speaker of the Parliament of Ghana; 2021 –	Incumbent
Order of precedence
Preceded by Mahamudu Bawumia; Vice President of Ghana	Alban Bagbin; Speaker of the Parliament of Ghana	Succeeded by Kwasi Anin-Yeboah; Chief Justice of Ghana
