= Nadowli District =

- Former District
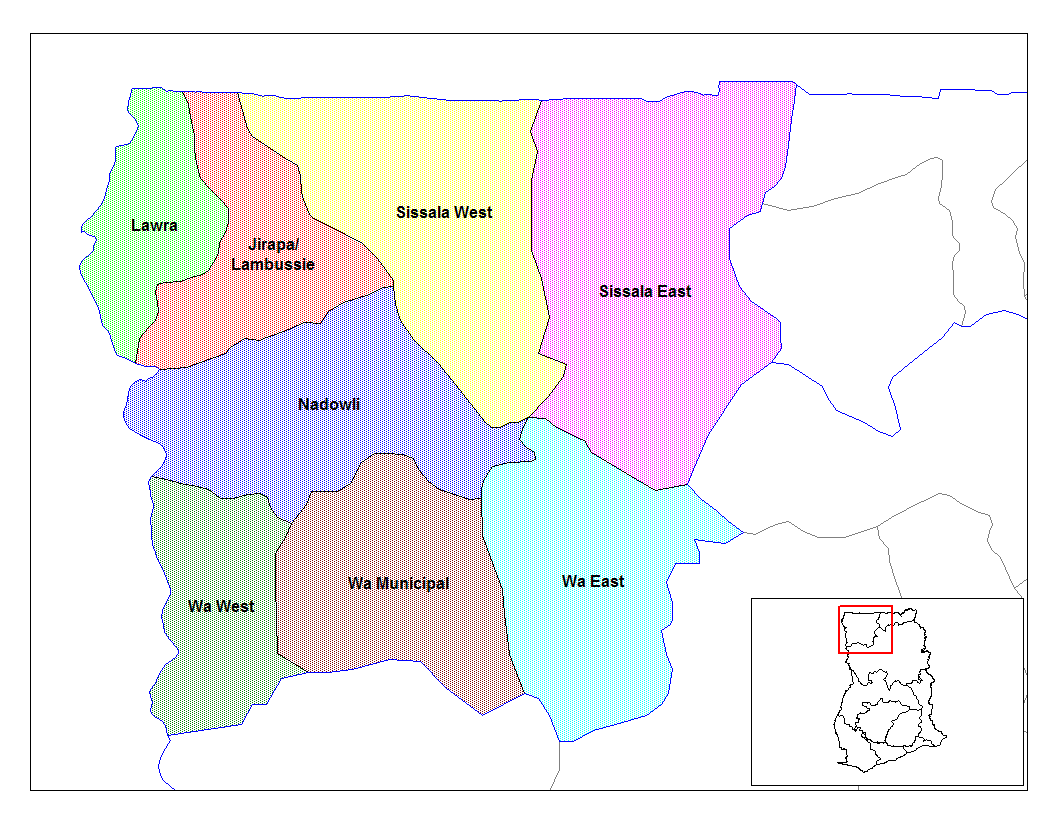
- Districts of Upper West Region

- Location of Nadowli District within Upper West
- Coordinates: 10°22′26″N 2°40′26″W
- Country: Ghana
- Region: Upper West
- Capital: Nadowli

Government
  - District Executive: Eric Dakura

Area
  - Total: 2,594 km^{2} (1,002 sq mi)

Population (2013)
  - Total: —
- Time zone: UTC+0 (GMT)
- ISO 3166 code: GH-UW-ND

Nadowli District is a former district that was located in Upper West Region, Ghana. Originally created as an ordinary district assembly in 1988. However, on 28 June 2012, it was split off into two new districts: Nadowli-Kaleo District (capital: Nadowli) and Daffiama-Bussie-Issa District (capital: Issa). The district assembly was located in the western part of Upper West Region and had Nadowli as its capital town.

== Geography ==
Nadowli District borders the Wa West District and the Wa Municipal District in the south. Nadowli District has a low-lying topography generally undulating between 150 m and 300 m but in some parts reaching an average of 600 m.

== Economy ==
Agriculture is the most important economic sector of Nadowli District, accounting for about 85% of the labor force. The commercial and industrial sectors are less developed.

== See also ==
- "Districts of Ghana". Statoids.
- GhanaDistricts.com
- Nadowli District Official Website
