= Daffiama-Bussie-Issa District =

- District
- Districts of Upper West Region

- Location of Daffiama-Bussie-Issa District within Upper West
- Coordinates: 10°23′32″N 2°19′57″W
- Country: Ghana
- Region: Upper West
- Capital: Issa

Population (2021)
  - Total: 38,754
- Time zone: UTC+0 (GMT)
- ISO 3166 code: GH-UW-DB

Daffiama-Bussie-Issa District is one of the eleven districts in Upper West Region, Ghana. Originally it was formerly part of the then-larger Nadowli District in 1988; until the eastern part of the district was later split off to create Daffiama-Bussie-Issa District on 28 June 2012; thus the remaining part has been renamed as Nadowli-Kaleo District. The district assembly is located in the western part of Upper West Region and has Issa as its capital town.
