= Wa Municipal District =

- Municipal District
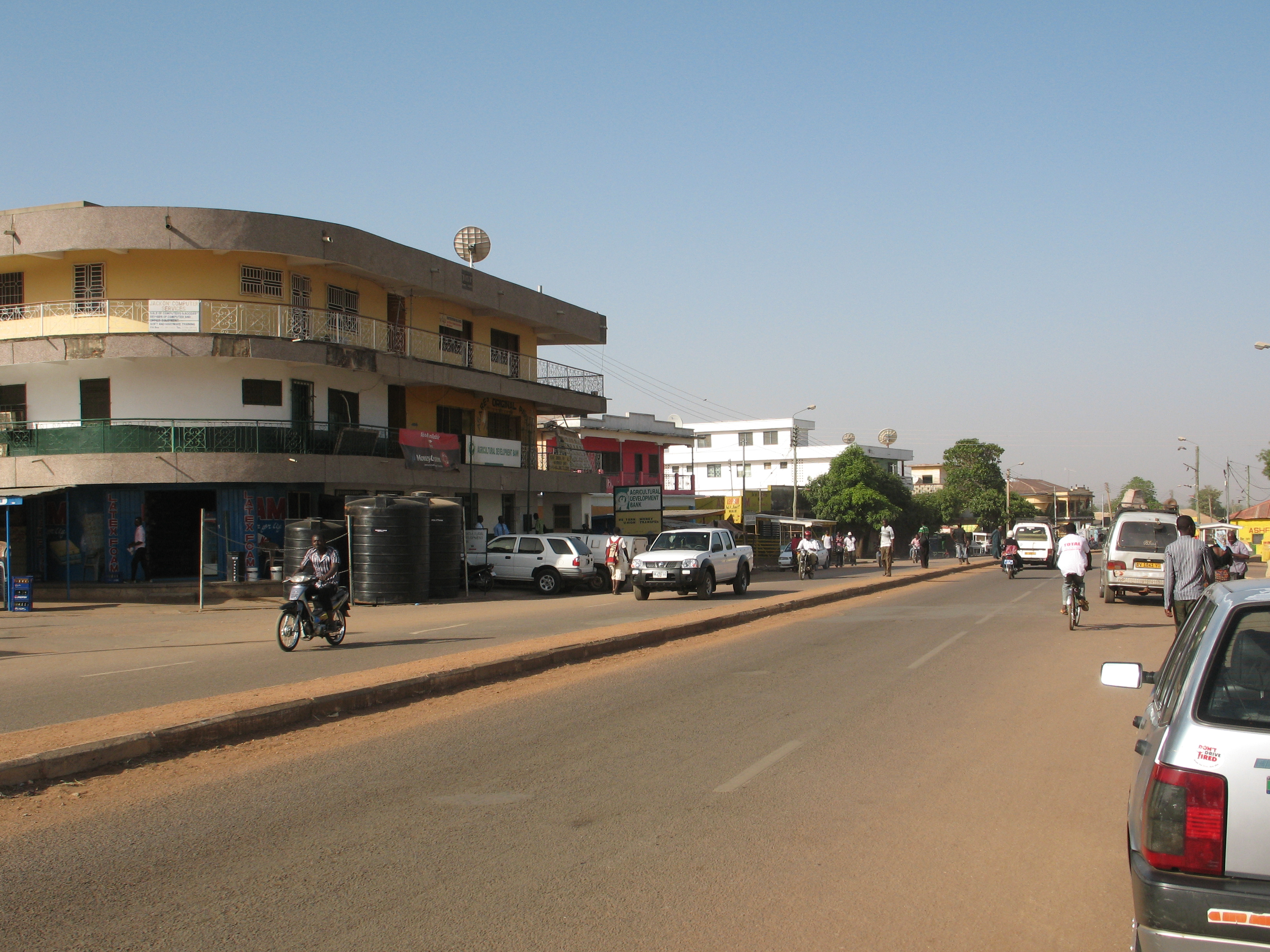
- View of a high street in Wa

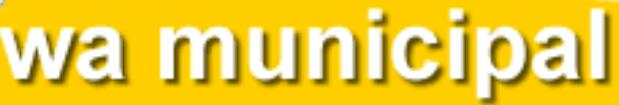
- Seal

- Districts of Upper West Region

- Location of Wa Municipal District within Upper West
- Coordinates: 10°3′36.36″N 2°30′35.64″W
- Country: Ghana
- Region: Upper West
- Capital: Wa

Government
  - Municipal Chief Executive: Tahiru Issahaku Moomin

Population (2021)
  - Total: 200,672
- Time zone: UTC+0 (GMT)
- ISO 3166 code: GH-UW-WA

Wa Municipal District is one of the eleven districts in Upper West Region, Ghana. Originally created as an ordinary district assembly in 1988 when it was known as Wa District, until two parts of the district were later split off by a decree of president John Agyekum Kufuor in July 2004 to create Wa East District (from the east) and Wa West District (from the west) respectively; thus the remaining part was later elevated to municipal district assembly status on the same year to become Wa Municipal District. The municipality is located in the southern part of Upper West Region and has Wa as its capital town, which also serves as the regional capital of the Upper West Region.

== Towns ==
- Charia

== Sources ==
- "Districts of Ghana". Statoids.
