= Wa West District =

- District
- Districts of Upper West Region

- Location of Wa West District within Upper West
- Coordinates: 9°49′35″N 2°40′51″W
- Country: Ghana
- Region: Upper West
- Capital: Wechiau

Government
  - District Executive: Adamu Dasaana

Population (2021)
  - Total: 96,957
- Time zone: UTC+0 (GMT)
- ISO 3166 code: GH-UW-WW

Wa West District is one of the eleven districts in Upper West Region, Ghana. Originally it was formerly part of the then-larger Wa District in 1988; until two parts of the district were later split off to create Wa East District (from the east) and Wa West District (from the west) respectively in July 2004; thus the remaining part was elevated to municipal district assembly status on the same year to become Wa Municipal District. The district assembly is located in the southern part of Upper West Region and has Wechiau as its capital town.

== Location ==
Wa West District shares boundaries with Sawla-Tuna-Kalba District to the South, Wa Municipal District to the East, Nadowli District to the North, and to the West with Ivory Coast.

== Sources ==
- "Districts of Ghana". Statoids.
- Wa West District Assembly Official Website
