= Dumsor =

Ghanaian term for unpredictable electric power outage

In Ghana, dumsor (Akan pronunciation: [dum sɔ] 'off and on') is a persistent, irregular, and unpredictable electric power outage. It is usually caused by a power supply shortage.

== Terminology ==
The term is derived from two separate words from the Asante, Akuapem, and Fante dialects of the Akan language: dum ('to turn off or quench') and sɔ ('to turn on or to kindle'), and it roughly translates as "off-and-on". The term has also evolved into dum dum: sɔ no mma ('off and off') reflecting the increased intensity of power outages..

In 2018, a new term was coined by the Energy Minister who referred to the dumsor as dum koraa, in contrast to the intermittent outages described as dum so.

By early 2019, Ghanaians began to experience another controversial wave of dumsor or load shedding, whose schedule was not published, despite the norm. Ghana's Parliament was even divided on what to call it. This thus ushered in the term dumsaa, meaning "off for a considerably long time" or "off all the time", and regarded as a superlative form of dumsor.

While officials of Ghana's energy sector regulators claimed that dumsaa, the new wave of dumsor, was due to transmission failures, sector analysts believed dumsaa was a matter of gross corporate liquidity mismanagement.

== History ==
Ghana's power supply profusely became erratic in early 2013, because of generation capacity and breach in contract obligations to external partners. By 2015, Ghana experienced an unprecedented days and nights of blackouts because of acute electricity supply. The term Dumsor is used to denote a period of a permanently erratic power supply under the NDC administration when Ghanaian generating capacity by 2015 went all-time low 400-600 megawatts, less than Ghana needed. Ghanaian electricity distributors regularly shed load with rolling blackouts. At the beginning of 2015, the dumsor schedule went from 24 hours with light and 12 without to 12 hours with light and 24 without. The long blackouts contrast with the practice in other countries, where blackouts roll rapidly so that no residential area is without power for more than one hour at a time.

In August 2012, the government told Ghanaians that a ship's anchor cut the West African Gas Pipeline (WAGP), forcing gas turbines to shut down for lack of fuel. Since 2012, load shedding has become a regular experience, and the country has plunged into a major power crisis.

== Social and economic effects ==
Many Ghanaian companies were collapsing due to the irregularity of the power supply. The Institute of Statistical, Social and Economic Research (ISSER), in a report, stated that Ghana lost about 1 billion dollars in 2014 alone because of dumsor. A woman in labour at the Bawku Presby Hospital who gave birth and was on oxygen lost both her life and that of the unborn baby after power supply went off in February 2016.

Electronic equipment has been avoidably damaged, and refrigerated food regularly spoiled. Contrary to the published load shedding schedule, blackouts concentrated on poorer neighbourhoods of Accra. Health and safety was also harmed, with hospitals having no light, and electricity to run fans, contributed to an increasing malaria risk.

== Political effects ==
The 2004-2005 load shedding period happened under President John Agyekum Kufuor's administration but was not too frequent as during the tenure of John Dramani Mahama. The 2009–2011 load shedding period began when John Dramani Mahama was in government as Vice President. After the death of then President John Evans Atta Mills during when the persistent on and off nature of the power supply in the country became abhorrent, Ghanaians out of frustration named the situation dumsor. The Mahama government blamed it on the government's inability to add significant generating capacity over the years and promised to fix this. Karpower Burge was brought in to solve the problem.

The Ghanaian transmission system has been criticized by the World Bank for its poor financial and operational practices.

The Ghanaian Ministry of Power was created in November 2014, using the same staff as the continuing Ghanaian Ministry of Energy. Ghanaian actress Yvonne Nelson then started the #dumsormuststop campaign on social media and other Ghanaian celebrities joined her. Subsequently, hundreds attended a vigil in Accra on 16 May 2015 to protest against dumsor.

== Mitigation ==
The Ghanaian government has plans to diversify its energy sources, using more renewables. It is also working to encourage energy conservation.

== Usage ==
The word has been used by the general public in Ghana since 2012 in expressing anger, fun, mockery, worry and disappointment about the authorities and the ruling government.

It has also gained popularity via social media websites such as Twitter and Facebook with the hashtag #Dumsor. In 2015, John Mahama used the word in a state visit to Germany while talking with Angela Merkel. He said he has been nicknamed "Mr. Dumsor" due to the power crisis, which he attributed to Nigeria for not supplying gas as required to Ghana through the West Africa Gas Pipeline.

In a speech lamenting the poor electricity supply across Sub-Saharan African states, P. L. O. Lumumba, the Kenya lawyer and Pan-Africanist used the phrase dumsor dumsor making a statement that, "this dumsorization of African must stop".

== 2024 Dumsor Threats ==
In recent years, Ghana has worked hard to stabilize its power sector, but in 2024, the Institute for Energy Security (IES) said that the nation faces renewed threats of power crisis as 560MW of Sunon Asogli Power Plant was shut down due to debt dispute.

Sunon Asogli Power Plant is one of the largest power producers in Ghana. It provides about 12-15% of the country's electricity.

== See also ==
- Electricity Company of Ghana
- Ghana Grid Company
- Northern Electricity Distribution Company
- Volta River Authority
- Sunon Asogli Thermal Power Station
