= Ministry of Energy and Green Transition (Ghana) =

Government ministry of Ghana

Ministry of Energy
- Ministry of Energy and Green Transition

Ministry overview
- Formed: 1957; 69 years ago
- Preceding agencies: Ministry of Energy and Petroleum; (Ministries of Petroleum & Power, pre-2017)
- Jurisdiction: Government of Ghana
- Headquarters: Kinbu Road, Accra, Greater Accra Region, Ghana; 5.55138°N 0.20071°W
- Employees: ~ 126 (as of 2018)
- Annual budget: (see 2023 budget)*
- Minister responsible: John Abdulai Jinapor, Minister for Energy and Green Transition
- Ministry executive: *(Permanent Secretary, if known)*, Permanent Secretary
- Parent Ministry: Government of Ghana
- Child agencies: Ghana National Petroleum Corporation (GNPC); National Petroleum Authority (NPA); Energy Commission (Ghana); Electricity Company of Ghana (ECG)
- Website: www.energymin.gov.gh

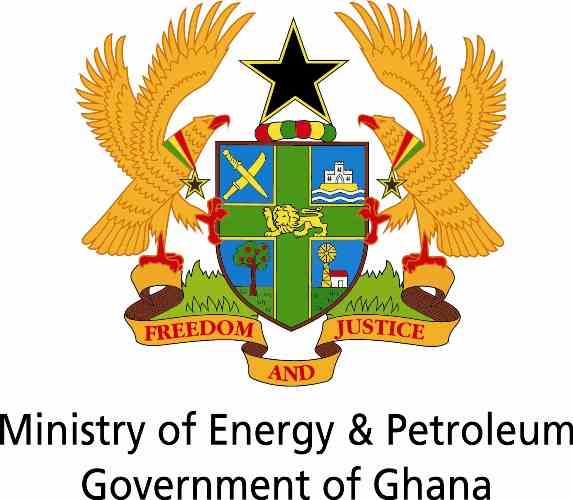

The Ministry for Energy and Green Transition (formerly the Ministry of Energy and Petroleum) is the government ministry responsible for ensuring a sustainable, reliable, and environmentally friendly energy supply throughout Ghana

== History ==
In 2012, the Ministry of Energy was renamed the Ministry of Energy and Petroleum. In November 2014, the Ministry of Energy and Petroleum was reorganised into two separate ministries: the Ministry of Power and the Ministry of Petroleum. On 27 February 2017, the Ministries of Power and Petroleum were merged through Executive Instrument (E.I. 28) to re-establish the Ministry of Energy. The Ministry is responsible for the formulation, coordination, monitoring, and evaluation of policies and programmes in the energy sector. In 2025, the ministry was renamed the Ministry of Energy and Green Transition through the Civil Service (Ministries) Instrument, 2025 (E.I. 1), issued on 9 January 2025 under section 11(3) of the Civil Service Act, 1993 (P.N.D.C.L. 327).

== Agencies under the Ministry ==
The Ministry has oversight responsibility for agencies under its jurisdiction.These agencies include:

- Ghana National Petroleum Corporation (GNPC)
- Ghana National Gas Company (GNGC)
- National Petroleum Authority (NPA)
- Bulk Oil Storage and Transportation (BOST)
- Tema Oil Refinery (TOR)
- Ghana Cylinder Manufacturing Company (GCMC)
- Volta River Authority (VRA)
- Ghana Grid Company (GRIDCo)
- Electricity Company of Ghana (ECG)
- Northern Electricity Distribution Company (NEDCo)
- Bui Power Authority (BUI)
- Volta Aluminium Company (VALCO)
- Energy Commission (Ghana)
- Petroleum Commission (Ghana)
- Volta Resettlement Trust Fund
- Petroleum Hub Development Corporation (PHDC)
- Nuclear Power Ghana (NPG)

== Functions of the Ministry ==
The Ministry of Energy and Green Transition is responsible for the formulation, implementation, monitoring, and evaluation of policies relating to Ghana's energy sector. It also supervises and coordinates the activities of energy sector agencies and works to ensure reliable, high-quality energy services while promoting universal access to energy in an environmentally sustainable manner.

- Regulation & Oversight

The Ministry supervises and coordinates the activities of agencies within Ghana's energy sector, including the Energy Commission, Petroleum Commission, Volta River Authority (VRA), Ghana National Petroleum Corporation (GNPC), and Electricity Company of Ghana (ECG).

- Energy Planning: The Ministry coordinates the planning and development of electricity, renewable energy, and petroleum programmes, and translates the Government's energy policies into strategies and programmes for implementation.
- Promoting Renewable Energy: The Ministry promotes the development and utilisation of renewable energy in Ghana in accordance with the Renewable Energy Act, 2011 (Act 832), as part of efforts to achieve a sustainable energy sector.
- Petroleum Sector Development: The Ministry formulates policies and coordinates the development of Ghana's petroleum sector, including the upstream and downstream petroleum sub-sectors, as well as gas commercialisation and gas infrastructure.
- Energy Security: The Ministry ensures the availability and security of energy supplies, promotes the reliable, affordable supply of energy services, and increases access to modern energy services across Ghana.

== Structure ==
The Minister for Energy and Green Transition is the political head of the ministry and is responsible for providing leadership and policy direction for Ghana's energy sector. The position is appointed by the President of Ghana and is subject to approval by Parliament of Ghana. The current minister is John Abdulai Jinapor (MP), who was appointed under the John Dramani Mahama administration. Before John Abdulai Jinapor, Herbert Krapa served as the Minister of Energy under the Nana Akufo-Addo administration. Matthew Opoku Prempeh also served as sector minister until July 2024, when he was selected as running mate of Mahamudu Bawumia for the 2024 general elections.

== Heads of the Ministry (Fourth Republic) ==
Number	Name (Minister)	Duration	Profession	Political Party	Deputy
1	Richard Kwame Peprah	1993 - August 1995	Politician, engineer,and economist	National Democratic Congress (NDC)	
2	Edward Kojo Salia	August 1995 - 1996	Politician	National Democratic Congress (NDC)	
3	Albert Kan-Dapaah	2001 - 2003	Politician and Chartered Accountant	New Patriotic Party (NPP)	K.T. Hammond
4	Dr. Paa Kwasi Nduom	April 2023 - January 2005	Politician, Consultant, and Economist	Convention People's Party (CPP)	K.T. Hammond
5	Prof. Aaron Mike Oquaye	2005 - 2006	Politician, Academic, and Lawyer	New Patriotic Party (NPP)	K.T. Hammond
7	Joseph Kofi Adda	April 2006 - April 2008	Politician, Management Consultant, and Financial Economist	New Patriotic Party (NPP)	K.T. Hammond
8	Felix Kwasi Owusu-Adjapong	June 2008 - January 2009	Politician and Lawyer	New Patriotic Party (NPP)	Kwame Ampofo Twumasi
9	Dr. Joe Oteng-Adjei	January 2009 - January 2013	Politician, Academic and Electrical Engineer	National Democratic Congress (NDC)	Emmanuel Armah-Kofi Buah; Dr. Kwabena Donkor
10	Emmanuel Armah-Kofi Buah (Minister for Petroleum)	December 2014 - January 2017	Politician and Public Administrator	National Democratic Congress (NDC)	Benjamin Kwaku Dagadu
11	Dr. Kwabena Donkor (Minister for Power)	December 2014 - December 2017	Politician, Energy Expect and Economist	National Democratic Congress (NDC)	John Abdulai Jinapor
12	Boakye Kyeremanteng Agyarko	February 2017 - August 2018	Politician, Economist, and Banker	New Patriotic Party (NPP)	William Owuraku Aidoo Dr. Mohammed Amin Adam Joseph Cudjoe
13	John Peter Amewu	August 2018 - January 2021	Politician, Cost Engineer, and Energy Expect	New Patriotic Party (NPP)	William Owuraku Aidoo Dr. Mohammed Amin Adam Joseph Cudjoe
14	Dr. Matthew Opoku Prempeh (NAPO)	January 2021 - February 2024	Politician and Medical Doctor	New Patriotic Party (NPP)	Dr. Mohammed Amin Adam William Owuraku Aidoo Andrew Kofi Egyapa Mercer
15	John Abdulai Jinapor	January 2015 - Present	Politician and Energy Expert	National Democratic Congress (NDC)	Richard Gyan- Mensah

== Legislation ==
- Energy Commission Act, 1997 (Act 541) The Act established the Energy Commission of Ghana and provides the legal framework for regulating and developing Ghana's energy sector.
- Renewable Energy Act, 2011 (Act 832) The Act provides the legal framework for the development, management, utilisation and promotion of renewable energy in Ghana.
- Petroleum Commission Act, 2011 (Act 821) The Act established the Petroleum Commission to regulate and manage the utilisation of petroleum resources and to coordinate policies relating to petroleum activities in Ghana.
- Petroleum (Exploration and Production) Act, 2016 (Act 919) The Act provides the legal framework for petroleum exploration and production activities in Ghana and regulates upstream petroleum operations.
- Ghana National Petroleum Corporation Law, 1983 (P.N.D.C.L. 64) The Act established the Ghana National Petroleum Corporation (GNPC) and provides for its functions in Ghana's petroleum industry.
- National Petroleum Authority Act, 2005 (Act 691) The Act established the National Petroleum Authority (NPA) to regulate, oversee and monitor activities in Ghana's downstream petroleum industry.

== Initiatives Undertaken ==
- National Electrification Scheme (NES)

The National Electrification Scheme (NES) was instituted in 1989 as a framework for expanding access to electricity in Ghana. The scheme focused on extending electricity supply through the expansion of the national electricity grid.

- Self Help Electrification Programme (SHEP)

The Self Help Electrification Programme (SHEP) was introduced as a complementary programme under the National Electrification Scheme (NES). The programme supported communities that met specified conditions to advance their connection to the national electricity grid before their scheduled connection under the electrification plan.

- Renewable Energy Master Plan (REMP)

The Renewable Energy Master Plan (REMP) was developed to provide a framework for the development and promotion of renewable energy resources in Ghana. The plan was prepared by the Ministry of Energy in collaboration with the Energy Commission to guide renewable energy development in the country.

- Ghana National Energy Transition Framework

The Ghana National Energy Transition Framework was developed by the Ministry of Energy in collaboration with other relevant government institutions to guide Ghana's transition towards a sustainable energy sector. The framework identifies pathways for managing the country's energy transition while taking into account economic, social, and energy security considerations.

- Rural LPG Promotion Programme

The Rural LPG Promotion Programme was initiated by the Ministry of Energy and the National Petroleum Authority to encourage the use of liquefied petroleum gas (LPG) as an alternative cooking fuel in rural and peri-urban communities. The programme aimed to reduce dependence on charcoal and wood fuel while promoting cleaner cooking options. The Ministry reported the distribution of LPG cylinders, cookstoves, and related accessories under the programme from its introduction through 2017.

== Achievements ==
The ministry has increased the number of towns and communities on the national grid as well as improved the quality of supply of electricity. In 2002, the Tema Oil Refinery in Tema was fitted with a residual fuel catalytic cracker. This was to allow for the recovery of additional refined products from fuel oil that were previously wasted. In 2003, it completed and commissioned a 161 kilovolts transmission line to supply the Prestea to Obuasi. The ministry also advanced policies on deregulating the petroleum sector in Ghana. Under the Rural Kerosine Distribution Improvement Program, the ministry financed the fabrication and distribution of 700 kerosene tanks for each of the country's 110 districts. The ministry distributed televisions and installed solar panels in 160 Junior High Schools in all ten regions of Ghana to enable school children in rural communities to watch the weekly President's Special Initiative on Distance Learning Program while in school. This is to promote teaching and learning in schools that do not have an electricity supply.

== See also ==
- Electricity sector in Ghana
