= Pwalugu Hydroelectric Power Station =

Hydroelectric power station in Ghana

- Map of Ghana showing the location of Pwalugu HPP. Pwalugu Hydroelectric Power Station (Africa) Pwalugu Hydroelectric Power Station (Earth)
- Country: Ghana
- Location: Pwalugu, Talensi District, Upper East Region
- Coordinates: 10°36′02″N 00°19′50″W
- Purpose: Power
- Status: Under construction
- Construction began: June 2020
- Opening date: January 2024 (Expected)
- Owner: Government of Ghana
- Operator: Volta River Authority

Dam and spillways
- Type of dam: Reservoir
- Impounds: White Volta
- Height: 165 metres (541 ft)

Reservoir
- Surface area: 350 square kilometres (140 mi^{2})

Power Station
- Turbines: 2 x 30MW
- Installed capacity: 60 megawatts (80,000 hp)

Pwalugu Hydroelectric Power Station is a 60 megawatts (80,000 hp) hydroelectric power station, under construction in Ghana. When completed, it is expected to connect to the planned 50 megawatts (67,000 hp) Kurugu Solar Power Station to form the 110 megawatts (150,000 hp) Pwalugu-Kurugu Hydro-Solar Hybrid Power Plant, the first of its type in the country.

== Location ==
The power station, which sits across the White Volta, is located near the town of Pwalugu, in Talensi District, in the Upper East Region, approximately 142 kilometres (88 mi), northeast of Tamale, Ghana, the capital and largest city in the Northern Region of Ghana. This is about 765 kilometres (475 mi), north of Accra, the capital and largest city in Ghana.

== Overview ==
The Pwalugu Multipurpose Dam that supplies this power station has several purposes, including (a) creation of a reservoir lake that measures 350 square kilometres (140 mi^{2}) (b) supply of water to the power station, whose energy output will vary between 16.5 megawatts and 60 megawatts, depending on the rate of water release from the reservoir and (c) supply of water to an irrigation scheme that measures 25,000 hectares (97 mi^{2}), benefiting 15,000 people dependent on agriculture for a living. The energy output of this power station, will be augmented by a planned 50 megawatts (67,000 hp), solar power station in Kurugu, a neighborhood in the town of East Mamprusi, North-East Region, approximately 90 kilometres (56 mi) southeast of Pwalugu.

== Construction costs and funding ==
The infrastructure development project is budgeted at US$993 million. The Parliament of Ghana approved the budget item in March 2020. The procurement, engineering and construction contract was awarded to Power China International. However, other credible sources have reported the EPC contractor to be Sinohydro.

In June 2020, Power Construction Corporation of China (PowerChina), began site clearing and other pre-construction activities in Pwalugu. The budgeted cost includes the cost of erecting the 50 megawatts solar plant in East Mamprusi. Completion of construction and commercial commissioning are expected in 2024.

== See also ==
- List of power stations in Ghana
