= Osagyefo Barge =

Power generating station in Effasu, Ghana

- Country: Ghana
- Location: Effasu
- Coordinates: 5°04′46″N 3°02′18″W
- Status: Existing; never operated

Thermal power station
- Primary fuel: Natural gas
- Secondary fuel: Diesel

Power generation
- Nameplate capacity: 125 MW

The Osagyefo Barge is a 125 MW barge-mounted gas turbine electric power generating station located at Effasu in the Western Region of Ghana.

The 77 m long barge is equipped with a pair of single-cycle heavy-duty gas turbine units built by Ansaldo that have a combined generating capacity of 125 MW. It is designed to burn either natural gas or diesel fuel.

The 125 MW power barge was ordered by the Ghanaian government in 1995 with financial assistance from the Overseas Economic Cooperation Fund of Japan. It was intended to generate electricity from natural gas obtained from offshore production fields. The project development called for 450 MW of combined cycle power barges to belated in a man made lagoon. The barge was built in Italy at Navalmare Yard, completed in 1999, and delivered to Ghana in October 2002. It was then moored at the Sekondi Naval Base in Sekondi until 2005, when it was moved to Effasu after the completion of dredging necessary to allow it to enter the harbor there. The offshore oil and gas fields did not develop as quickly as expected, so the power barge sat idle and its condition deteriorated. There was a proposal to move the barge to Tema, but that proposal was dropped in 2007. During this period, there was little maintenance conducted on the power barge or on the site, resulting in the deterioration of many of the systems.

The power barge project was initially under the management of Western Power, a subsidiary of GNPC the Ghana National Petroleum Corporation; responsibility was transferred to the Volta River Authority in 2003. In July 2007, the government of Ghana entered an unsolicited 20-year lease agreement with the company Balkan Energy Ghana to refurbish and operate the power barge, initially using diesel fuel and later using gas to be delivered by the West African Gas Pipeline. Ghana sought additional electricity supplies from the barge to alleviate electricity shortages resulting from reduced water levels at the Akosombo Dam hydroelectric project. The company promised to begin operations within 90 days. Also, plans were announced to increase the barge's generating capacity by 60 MW, bringing it from its current capacity of 125 MW up to 185 MW. The unit has never operated and the expansion was not completed. The government of Ghana sued in Ghanaian court, seeking to nullify the contract with Balkan Energy. Balkan Energy blamed ProEnergy, a U.S. company with which it had contracted, for Balkan's inability to bring the generating station online when promised. Balkan Energy and ProEnergy sued each other in U.S. courts and the government of Ghana later filed a lawsuit against ProEnergy in U.S. court.

The name "Osagyefo" commemorates Kwame Nkrumah, the first president of Ghana.

== See also ==
- List of power stations in Ghana
- Electricity sector in Ghana
