= Armech Thermal Power Station =

Power station in Ghana

- Country: Ghana
- Location: Tema
- Coordinates: 05°41′57″N 00°01′47″E
- Status: Under construction
- Commission date: 2021 Expected
- Owner: Armech Africa Limited
- Operator: Electricity Company of Ghana (ECG)

Power generation
- Units planned: 4
- Nameplate capacity: 60 megawatts (80,000 hp)

The Armech Thermal Power Station (ATPS), is a planned waste powered electricity power station in Ghana, with a proposed installed capacity of 60 megawatts (80,000 hp).

== Location ==
The facility would be located in the industrial area of the city of Tema, approximately 30 kilometres (19 mi), by road, east of Accra, the largest city and capital of Ghana.

== Overview ==
The Armech Thermal Power Station is a waste-to-energy (W2E) power plant located in Tema, Ghana's largest sea-port. The waste that will be burned to generate the electricity, will be sourced from several metropolitan and municipal assemblies in the Greater Accra Region. These include Accra, Tema, Ga South Municipal District, Ga East Municipal District, and La Dade Kotopon Municipal District. The Ghana Ministry of Local Government and Rural Development is a collaborator on this development.

The development of this power station is in response to the unsatisfactory waste-management environment in the Greater Accra area, particularly among the low-income communities. The dangers that these communities face include (a) bio-degraded waste that contains parasites and disease-causing microbes (b) toxic leachate which seeps from landfills into the water table and (c) the toxic emissions from landfill burning.

The poor environmental sanitation, leads to stagnation of drainage water and the breeding of disease-spreading mosquitoes. In the Greater Accra Area, 3.5 million malaria cases are recorded every year, with 900,000 of them occurring among children of less than five years of age, as of March 2018.

The power generated will be sold to the Electricity Company of Ghana, for integration into the national electricity grid.

== Construction ==
The power station is being built by Armech Africa Limited. The main contractor is Energy China, with money borrowed from Industrial and Commercial Bank of China. The construction cost is budgeted at US$300 million. This project represents the first grid-ready waste-to-energy project in the countries of the Economic Community of West African States. There are plans to develop a second waste-to-energy plant in Kumasi, in the Ashanti Region.

== See also ==
- List of power stations in Ghana
- Electricity sector in Ghana
