= Gomoa Onyaadze Solar Power Station =

Solar farm in Ghana

- Country: Ghana
- Location: Gomoa West District; Central Region, Ghana
- Coordinates: 05°20′46″N 00°42′12″W
- Status: Operational
- Construction began: 2016
- Commission date: 2018
- Construction cost: US$30 million (€26 million)
- Owner: Meinergy Ghana Limited
- Operator: Meinergy Ghana Limited

Solar farm
- Type: Flat-panel PV

Power generation
- Units operational: 64400
- Nameplate capacity: 20 MW (27,000 hp)

The Gomoa Onyaadze Solar Power Station is an operational grid-connected 20 megawatts (27,000 hp) solar power plant, in Ghana. The privately owned power station sells its power to the Power Distribution Services Ghana (PDSG), formerly Electricity Company of Ghana (ECG), under a long-term power purchase agreement.

== Location ==
The power station is located in Gomoa West District, in the Central Region of Ghana, south of the settlement of Otaw, Ghana, on the road between Otaw and Mankwadze, Ghana, on the Atlantic coast. This is approximately 71 kilometres (44 mi) west of the city of Accra, the capital and largest city in the country. Otaw is located approximately 12 kilometres (7 mi), west of the town of Winneba in neighboring Effutu Municipal District, the nearest large town. The geographical coordinates of Gomoa Onyaadze Solar Power Station are 05°20'46.0"N, 0°42'12.0"W (Latitude:5.346111; Longitude:-0.703333). This power station is in close proximity with BXC Solar Power Station (Onyandze Solar Power Station), established in 2016.

== Overview ==
The power station uses a total of 64,400 solar photo voltaic (PV) modules which, when struck by sunlight, generate direct current (DC) electricity. Using 400 inverters, the DC is converted to alternating current (AC), which is fed into the national electricity grid, via a high voltage transmission line from the power station to the PDSG substation in Winneba.

== Developers ==
The solar farm was developed, financed and is owned and operated by Meinergy Ghana Limited, a Ghanaian independent power producer (IPP).

== Costs, funding and timeline ==
The construction costs for this power station is reported as $30 million by one source. Another reliable source reported the cost at €23 million. All the financing was incurred by the owner/developers. The power station was commercially commissioned on 16 September 2018.

== See also ==
- List of power stations in Ghana
- Electricity sector in Ghana
