= Kpone Thermal Power Station =

Kpone Thermal Power Station may refer to:

- Kpone Thermal Power Station I, a 230 megawatts power station owned by the Volta River Authority, expected to come online in 2016.
- Kpone Thermal Power Station II, a 340 megawatts power station owned by independent power producers, expected to come online in 2017.
