= Kaleo Solar Power Station =

Solar power station in Ghana

- Country: Ghana
- Location: Kaleo, Nadowli-Kaleo District, Upper West Region
- Coordinates: 10°10′27″N 02°32′01″W
- Status: Operational
- Construction began: February 2020
- Commission date: August 2022
- Construction cost: US$25 million
- Owner: Volta River Authority

Solar farm
- Type: Flat-panel PV

Power generation
- Nameplate capacity: 13 MW (17,000 hp)

The Kaleo Power Station is a 13 MW (17,000 hp) solar power plant in Ghana. It is owned and was developed by the Volta River Authority, between February 2020 and August 2022. The power off-taker is GRIDCo (Ghana Grid Company), which integrates the electricity into the national grid.

== Location ==
The power station is located on 20.4 hectares (50 acres), in the town of Kaleo, in Nadowli-Kaleo District, in the Upper West Region of Ghana. Kaleo is located approximately 27.5 kilometres (17 mi) southeast of the town of Nadowli, the district headquarters. This is about 18.5 kilometres (11 mi) northwest of the city of Wa, the capital of Ghana's Upper West Region. Kaleo is located approximately 714 kilometres (444 mi) northwest of Accra the capital and largest city of Ghana. The geographical coordinates of Kaleo Solar Farm are:10°10'27.0"N, 2°32'01.0"W (Latitude:10.174167; Longitude:-2.533611).

== Overview ==
The power station has a generation capacity of 13 MW in the first phase. The second phase with new generation capacity of 15 MW construction started in 2022 and was commercially commissioned in 2023. This bring generation capacity at Kaleo to a total of 28 MW.

The power is evacuated via a 34.5kV high voltage transmission line to a GRIDCo substation in Wa, about 15 kilometres (9 mi) away, where the electricity is fed into the national grid. This power station, together with Lawra Solar Power Station, with capacity of 4 MW are intended to supply stable renewable power to the city of Wa and the surrounding metropolis.

== Developers ==
The power station was developed by Volta River Authority (VRA), who also own and operate the solar farm. At the same time, VRA developed the 4 MW Lawra Solar Power Station, on 6.13 hectares (15.1 acres) in the town of Lawra. Lawra is located about 71 kilometres (44 mi) northwest of Kaleo, close to the border with Burkina Faso.

== Construction and funding ==
The construction costs for Kaleo Solar Farm (13 MW) and Lawra Solar Farm (4 MW) were reported to be approximately US$25 million (€20.2 million), with loan support from the German Development Bank (KfW). VRA is expected to borrow another €15 million from KfW to add another 15 MW in the second phase at Kaleo.

== See also ==
- List of power stations in Ghana
