= Pwalugu Multipurpose Dam =

Multipurpose dam in Ghana

- Map of Ghana showing the location of Pwalugu Multipurpose Dam
- Country: Ghana
- Location: Pwalugu Bridge, White Volta, North East Region, Ghana
- Coordinates: 10°35′08″N 00°50′30″W
- Purpose: Drinking, Irrigation & Power
- Status: Proposed
- Construction began: April 2020 Expected
- Opening date: H2: 2024 Estimate
- Construction cost: US$993 million
- Owner: Government of Ghana
- Operator: Volta River Authority

Dam and spillways
- Impounds: White Volta River
- Height: 165 metres (541 ft)

Reservoir
- Surface area: 350 square kilometres (86,000 acres)
- Normal elevation: 1,400 m (4,600 ft)

Power Station
- Commission date: 2026 (expected)
- Turbines: 2 x 30 MW
- Installed capacity: 60 MW (80,000 hp)

The Pwalugu Multipurpose Dam is a planned dam across the White Volta River, in Ghana. The dam will create a reservoir with surface area measuring 350 square kilometres (135 sq mi). The reservoir is expected to provide irrigation water to an estimated 25,000 hectares (62,000 acres) of agricultural land. It will also supply drinking water to populations living downstream of the infrastructure. In addition, the dam will host the Pwalugu Hydroelectric Power Station, with generating capacity of 60 MW (80,000 hp).

== Location ==
The power station would be on the White Volta River, along the Tamale–Bolgatanga Road, at the border of the Upper East Region and the North East Region.

The dam is approximately 24 kilometres (15 mi), by road, southeast of the town of Bolgatanga, on the road to Tamale.

This is approximately 139 kilometres (86 mi) by road, north of Tamale, the nearest large city.

== Overview ==
The dam at this location has been in the country's plans as far back as the 1990s. In 2013, with financial help from the French Development Agency (ADF), and technical assistance from the World Bank, an Environmental and Social Impact Assessment (ESIA) and feasibility study for the construction of a multi-purpose dam and irrigation scheme, were carried out for this site.

In April 2021 the Ghanaian ministerial cabinet approved the project. There had been hesitation to approve the developmental infrastructure project due to the high construction bill, budgeted at US$993 million.

It is reported that the 60 megawatts of hydroelectricity generated here will be complemented by a 50 megawatt solar park to be constructed at Kurugu, in East Mamprusi Municipal District, in the North East Region. When completed this combined hydroelectricity/solar power complex will be the first of its kind in Ghana.

== Funding ==
The renewable energy infrastructure project is being developed by the government of Ghana. Partial funding for the early stages was received from the Agence française de développement and the World Bank Group.

== Other considerations ==
In March 2020, it was reported that the engineering, procurement and construction (EPC) contract had been awarded to PowerChina, with a 50 months construction period. Completion is therefore expected in the second half of 2024.

== See also ==
- List of power stations in Ghana
- Akanyaru Multipurpose Dam
