= WAASPS =

WAASPS is a social entrepreneurship project in West Africa. Started in 2005 after 11 years of reflection and analysis of the West African market, WAASPS operate in the light aviation sector of the sub-continent.

Opening the Kpong Airfield in November 2005, the organisation provides pilot training, aircraft build, maintenance and repair and provides expertise for aerial survey, air-air and air-ground video, stunt-flying, agricultural surveillance and plantation selection work, aerial dispersal, etc.

Based near to the Kpong Dam in the Eastern Region of Ghana, the company contributes massively to the local economy through employment and as a major attraction to the high earning communities and tourists to the country.

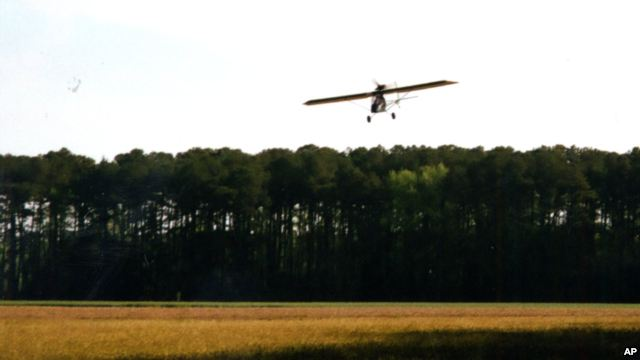
Patricia Mawuli Nyekodzi flying.

WAASPS works closely with the Ghana Civil Aviation Authority GCAA and is the only organisation in the country providing training for the National Pilots licence as defined under GCAR Part 25 called the Private Ultralight Pilot Licence or Certificate.

The first woman to gain Ghana's National Pilots Licence (PUP or Private Ultralight Pilot) was Patricia Mawuli Nyekodzi who gained her wings on 31 July 2009.
