= Navrongo Solar Power Station =

Solar power plant in Ghana

- Country: Ghana
- Location: Navrongo; Kassena-Nankana District; Upper East Region
- Coordinates: 10°55′24″N 01°03′19″W
- Status: Operational
- Construction began: 2012
- Commission date: 2013
- Owner: Volta River Authority

Solar farm
- Type: Flat-panel PV

Power generation
- Nameplate capacity: 2.5 MW (3,400 hp)

Navrongo Solar Power Station is a 2.5 MW (3,400 hp) solar power plant in Ghana.

== Location ==
The power station is located near the town of Navrongo, Kassena-Nankana District in the Upper East Region of Ghana. This location lies approximately 820 kilometres (510 mi) by road, north of Accra, the country's capital and largest city.

== Overview ==
Built at a cost of just over US$8 million, the plant is the first grid-ready solar station in the country. It is owned by Volta River Authority (VRA), the Ghanaian parastatal responsible for public electricity generation. The power plant was commissioned in 2013.

== See also ==
- List of power stations in Ghana
- Electricity sector in Ghana
