= Tema Thermal Power Station =

Power station in Ghana

Ghana Thermal Power Station
- Location of Tema Thermal Power Station in Ghana
- Country: Ghana
- Location: Tema
- Coordinates: 05°40′43″N 00°55′00″E
- Status: Operational
- Commission date: 2008
- Operator: Volta River Authority

Thermal power station
- Primary fuel: Diesel fuel

Power generation
- Nameplate capacity: 236 MW (316,000 hp)

Tema Thermal Power Station is a 236 MW (316,000 hp) diesel fuel-fired thermal power station in Ghana.

== Location ==
The power station is located in the Industrial Area neighborhood of the port city of Tema, approximately 30 kilometres (19 mi), east of the central business district of Accra, the capital and largest city in the country. The coordinates of the power station are: 05°40'43.0"N, 0°00'55.0"E (Latitude:5.677362; Longitude:0.015828).

== Overview ==
It was constructed in two stages. The first stage, known as TTPS1, with a capacity of 110 megawatts, owned by the Volta River Authority (VRA), was commissioned in 2008. The first stage consists of 25 Caterpillar 3516B diesel generators, each rated at 2000 kVA.

The second stage, TTPS2, commissioned in 2012 as a privately owned power project, with a capacity of 50 MW, consists of 12 Caterpillar 3516 TA diesel generators, each rated at 1750 kVA. It is owned by CENIT Energy Limited (CEL). CEL’s sole shareholder, CENIT Investment Limited, is an investment company, wholly owned by the Social Security and National Insurance Trust (SSNIT), a Ghanaian enterprise. TTPS2 shares premises with TTPS1 and the two share a common control room, switch gear and other common facilities.

The power plant is connected to the electricity grid in Ghana and supplies energy to Tema and Accra.

== See also ==
- Electricity sector in Ghana
- List of power stations in Ghana
- List of power stations in Africa
