= Kwabena Donkor =

Ghanaian politician (born 1958)

Hon. Kwabena Donkor
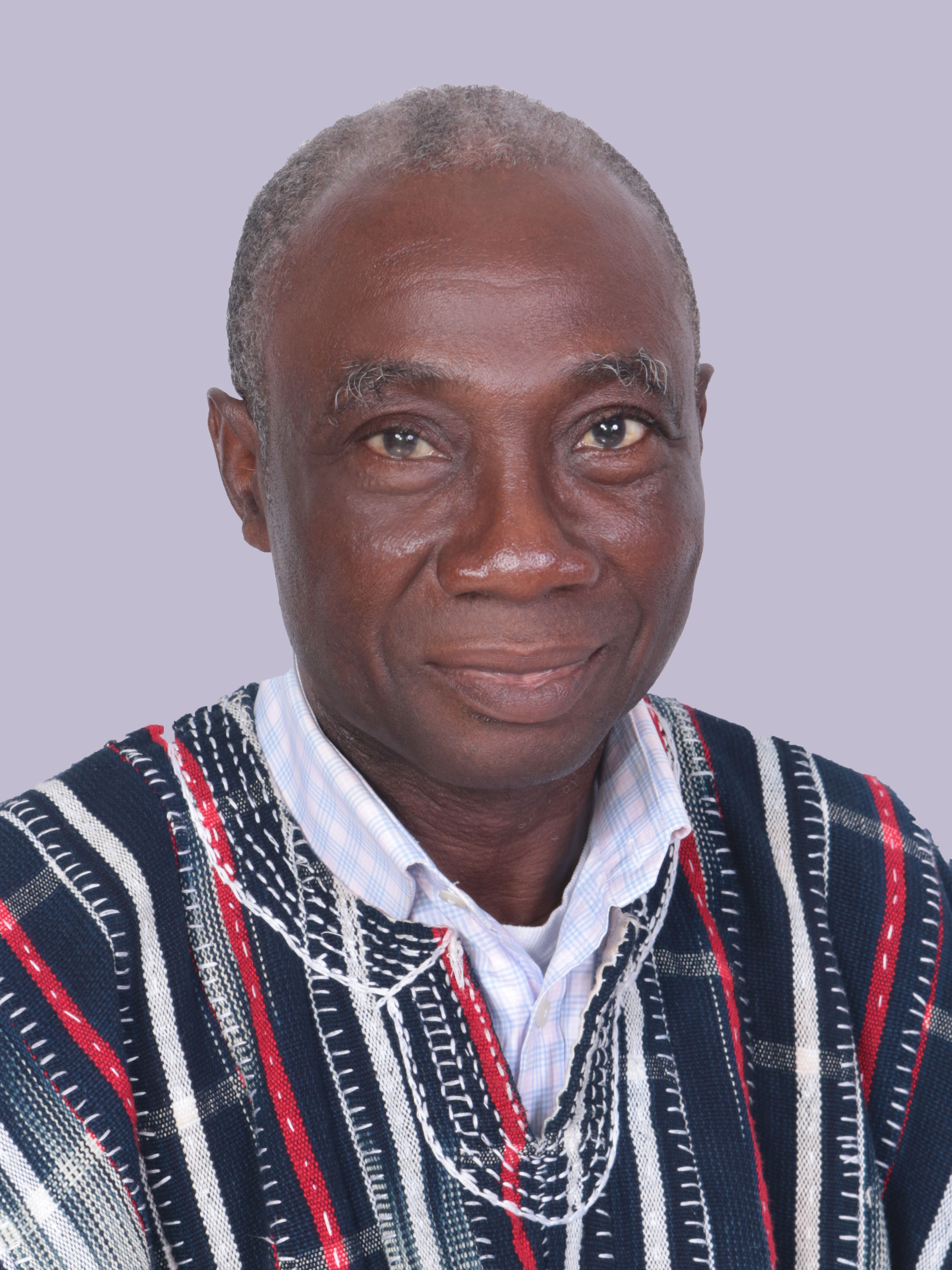

Member of Parliament
- Incumbent
- Assumed office 7 January 2013
- Preceded by: Masoud Baba Abdul-Rahman
- Constituency: Pru East

Minister for Power
- In office December 2014 – December 2015
- President: John Dramani Mahama

Personal details
- Born: 5 March 1958 (age 68) Lonto via Yeji, Ghana
- Party: National Democratic Congress
- Education: University of Bristol, Lancaster University
- Occupation: Politician
- Profession: Chief executive officer
- Committees: Employment, Social Welfare and State Enterprises Committee (Ranking Member); Standing Orders Committee; Mines and Energy Committee

Kwabena Donkor (born February 5, 1958) is a Ghanaian politician and a former Minister for Power. He is a former Member of Parliament for the Pru East constituency, in the Bono East Region of Ghana. He resigned from his office as minister due to failure to end load shedding popularity known as Dumsor, having promised to resign if he did not solve this before the end of 2015.

== Early years and education ==
Donkor was born on February 5, 1958, in Lonto via Yeji in the Bono East Region of Ghana. He holds a PhD and master's degree from the University of Bristol, and a Master of Business Administration from Lancaster University.

== Career ==
Donkor served as the deputy minister of information from 2013 to 2014. He is a founding member of Petroleum Commission and he served as its chief executive officer in 2014. In that same year, he became a cabinet minister of the Government of Ghana. He became a member of the Parliament of Ghana in 2015 and served as the Chairman of the Committee on Mines and Energy. He represented the Pru East Constituency in the Bono East Region on the ticket of the National Democratic Congress until 7 January 2021.

== Politics ==
Donkor contested for the seat of the Pru East constituency in the 2016 general elections and won. He garnered 13,512 votes which represents 56.19% of the total votes cast and therefore defeated the other contestants including David Amoah, Danjumah Desmond, Noah Ken Boadai and Zevor Mattew Tsiditsey. He retained his seat in the 2020 Ghanaian general election.

=== Committees ===
Donkor is the Ranking Member of the Employment, Social Welfare and State Enterprises Committee; also a member of the Standing Orders Committee; and also a member of the Mines and Energy Committee.

== Personal life ==
Donkor is a Christian. He is married with four children.
