= BXC (disambiguation) =

BXC or bxc may refer to:

- Bithorax complex (BX-C), one of two Drosophila melanogaster homeotic gene complexes
- bxc, ISO 639-3 code for Lengue language
- BXC, the NYSE code for BlueLinx, a wholesale distributor of building and industrial products
- Beijing Xiaocheng Company, an electronics and technology company, based in Beijing, China
