= Boam =

Boam is a surname. Notable people with this surname include:

- Anthony Boam (1932–2023), British Army general
- Emmanuel Kwaku Boam (born 1984), Ghanaian politician
- Harry Boam (born 1990), New Zealand cricketer
- Jeffrey Boam (1946–2000), American screenwriter and film producer
- Stuart Boam (1948–2025), English football player and manager
