= Private Ultralight Pilot =

The Private Ultralight Pilot licence/certificate or ' PUP ' is the National Pilot Licence in Ghana, West Africa.

Conditions and details are provided in GCAR Part 25. In essence the applicant is required to complete a minimum of 30 hours flight training of which 10 hours must be solo, pass a written examination on a selection of questions from Aviation Law, Airframes, Engines, Navigation, Human Performance and Limitations, etc., hold a valid aviation medical, complete a Qualifying Cross Country (QXC) and finally take the General Flying Test (GFT). The GFT is a test flight conducted by a UIE (Ultralight Instructor Examiner) which includes a minimum of 90 minutes flying to demonstrate skills from the majority of the syllabus.

PUP holders can fly aircraft of simple and robust construction with no more than two seats and a Maximum Take Off Weight (MTOW) of 500kg.

As of 2009 only one training organisation in West Africa provides the training: WAASPS based at Kpong Airfield in the Eastern Region of Ghana (30km south of Akosombo).
