= HPI, LLC =

- Company type: Limited Liability Corporation
- Industry: Turbomachinery; Control Systems; Industrial Automation; EPC
- Founded: 2002
- Headquarters: Houston, Texas, The United States
- Owner: Hal Pontez
- Website: www.hpi-llc.com

HPI, LLC, also called HPI, is a limited liability corporation based in Houston, TX specializing in the design and development, engineering, manufacturing, testing, installation, and commissioning of control and monitoring systems for industrial turbo-machinery applications. HPI was named one of the top private companies in Houston by the Houston Chronicle in 2012 and 2013.

== History ==
HPI, LLC was founded in 2002 by Hal Pontez when its former parent company, U.K.-based defense and power contractor Vosper Thornycroft, ceased operations.

In 2012, HPI, LLC joined the US - Ukraine Business Council.

== Projects ==
In 2008, the Kuwaiti Ministry of Energy (MOE) signed a $270 Million dollar contract to build a 200 MW power plant in Shuwaikh Port, making it the largest aeroderivative engine power plant of its kind in the Middle East. The Engineering, procurement and construction efforts were contracted to HPI, LLC, S&W Energy Solutions Inc. (SWES), an engineering firm, and Alghanim International (AI), a large Kuwaiti civil and electromechanical contractor. The power plant was built to assure a supply of electrical power to Kuwait City during the peak power usage months.

HPI along with S&W Solutions carried out the Engineering, procurement and construction (EPC) for the third plant in the Takoradi Power Station in Ghana. It is a 132 MW combined cycle power plant consisting of four gas turbines from Zorya-Mashproekt, the Ukrainian state gas turbine manufacturer, powered by a dual fuel source of light crude or natural gas, heat recovery steam generators and one steam turbine. The plant is operated by the Volta River Authority and cost $185 million.
