= Kpone Thermal Power Station II =

Thermal power station in Ghana

- Location of Kpone Thermal Power Station II in Ghana
- Country: Ghana
- Location: Kpone
- Coordinates: 05°40′26″N 00°02′15″E
- Status: Under construction
- Construction began: 2015
- Commission date: 2019
- Owner: Group Five Power International

Thermal power station
- Primary fuel: Natural gas
- Secondary fuel: Diesel fuel
- Tertiary fuel: Crude oil

Power generation
- Nameplate capacity: 340 MW (460,000 hp)

Kpone Thermal Power Station II, also Kpone Independent Thermal Power Station, is a 340 MW (460,000 hp) multi-fuel-fired thermal power station operating in Ghana.

== Location ==
The power station is located in the Kpone neighborhood of the port city of Tema, approximately 32 kilometres (20 mi), east of the central business district of Accra, the capital and largest city in the country.

== Overview ==
The power station is owned by CenPower Holdings, an independent power-producing company comprising local Ghanaian shareholders, African Finance Corporation (46%) and InfraCo Limited (24%). Group Five Power Projects was awarded the EPC contract to design, procure, construct and commission the power plant. WorleyParsons, an International firm that specializes in engineering, procurement, and construction was hired by Group Five to carry out the design functions. Seawater, accessed through underground pipes will be used to cool the power station, with the hot water effluent being returned to the sea through similar underground pipes. The power generated by this station will be sold directly to Electricity Company of Ghana (ECG), for integration into the Ghanaian national electricity grid.

== Funding and timetable ==
It is expected that the cost of construction is approximately US$900 million, borrowed from the Africa Finance Corporation (AFC). Other funders and equity partners include Sumitomo Corporation and FMO. Construction began in 2015 and the plant began commercial operation in 2019.

== See also ==
- Electricity sector in Ghana
- List of power stations in Ghana
