= Kpone Thermal Power Station I =

Power station in Ghana

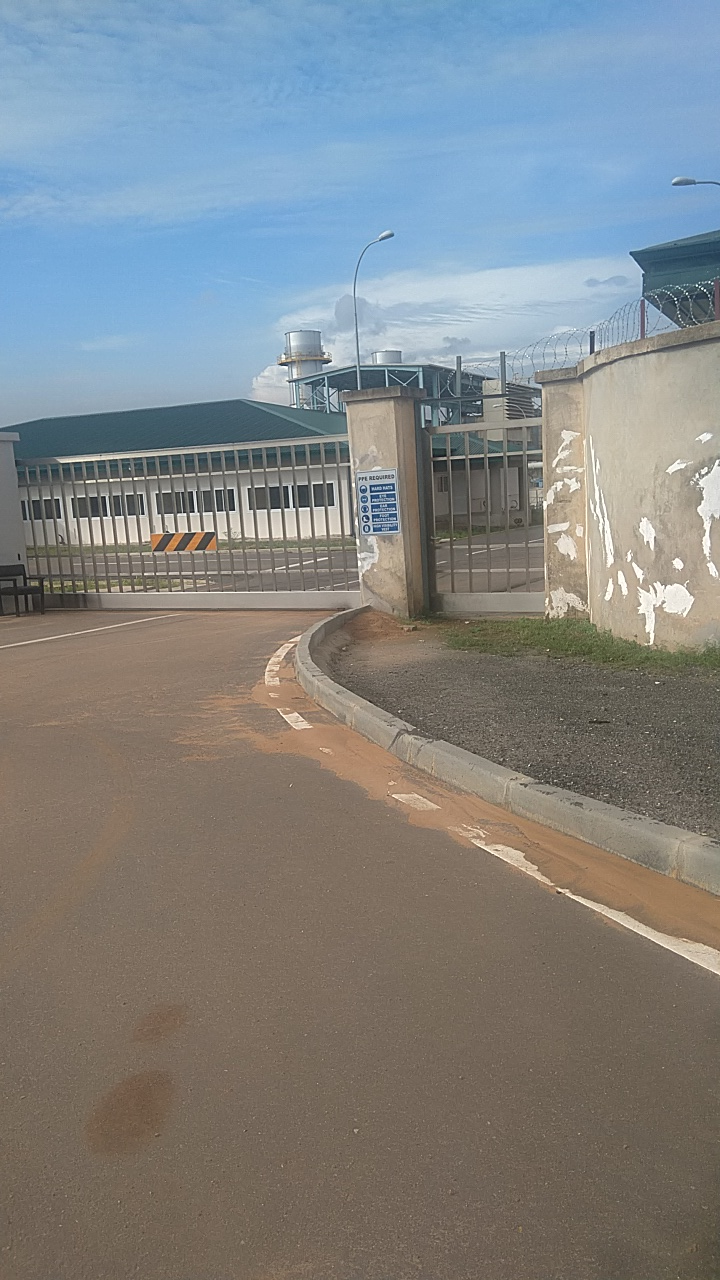
- Location of Kpone Thermal Power Station I in Ghana
- Country: Ghana
- Location: Kpone
- Coordinates: 05°44′06″N 00°00′38″E
- Status: Under construction
- Commission date: 2016 (Expected)
- Owner: Volta River Authority

Thermal power station
- Primary fuel: Natural gas
- Secondary fuel: Diesel fuel

Power generation
- Nameplate capacity: 230 MW (310,000 hp)

Kpone Thermal Power Station is a 230 MW (310,000 hp) gas-fired thermal power station in Ghana.

== Location ==
The power station is located in the Kpone neighborhood of the port city of Tema, approximately 31 kilometres (19 mi), east of the central business district of Accra, the capital and largest city in the country.

== Overview ==
The station is under construction since 2012 and is expected to come online in 2016. It is owned by the parastatal company called Volta River Authority.

== See also ==
- List of power stations in Ghana
- Electricity sector in Ghana
