= West African Gas Pipeline =

Natural gas pipeline in West Africa

West African Gas Pipeline Gazoduc ouest-africain

Location
- Country: Nigeria, Benin, Togo, Ghana
- Direction: east–west
- Start: Itoki terminal, Lagos, Nigeria
- To: Takoradi, Ghana

General information
- Type: natural gas
- Owner: West African Gas Pipeline Company Limited
- Partners: Chevron, Nigerian National Petroleum Corporation, Royal Dutch Shell, Volta River Authority, Société Togolaise de Gaz, Société Beninoise de Gaz
- Operator: Chevron
- Contractors: Willbros
- Commissioned: 2006

Technical information
- Length: 678 km (421 mi)
- Maximum discharge: 5 billion cubic metres per year
- Diameter: 508 mm (20 in)

The West African Gas Pipeline (French: Gazoduc ouest-africain; WAGP or GOA) is a natural gas pipeline to supply gas from Nigeria's Escravos region of the Niger Delta area to Benin, Togo and Ghana. It is the first regional natural gas transmission system in sub-Saharan Africa. An extension, the African Atlantic Gas Pipeline, is planned for a connection to all West African countries and, via Morocco, to Europe.

== History ==
The project began in 1982, when the Economic Community of West African States (ECOWAS) proposed the development of a natural gas pipeline throughout West Africa. In 1991, a feasibility report conducted by the World Bank on supplying Nigerian gas to West African markets deemed that a project was commercially viable.

In September 1995, the governments of four African countries signed a Heads of State Agreement. The feasibility study was carried out in 1999. On 11 August 1999, a Memorandum of Understanding was signed by participating countries in Cotonou, Benin. In February 2000, an Inter-Governmental Agreement was signed. The WAGP implementation agreement was signed in 2003. Groundbreaking ceremonies for the project were held at Sekondi-Takoradi, Ghana, on 3 December 2004. Construction began in 2005.

The offshore pipeline was completed in December 2006 and was scheduled to start operating on 23 December 2007 but was delayed after leaks were detected in supply pipelines in Nigeria. The second delivery deadline was scheduled on 13 February 2008, but regular deliveries were delayed again, when one of the contractors of Willbros was shot and killed in Nigeria by armed robbers.

Gas deliveries were expected by the end of 2009 after commissioning regulating and metering stations in Takoradi and Tema, Ghana, Lagos Beach, Nigeria, Cotonou, Benin, and Lomé, Togo in May 2008. However, deliveries were postponed again due to an irregular amount of moisture found inside the onshore gas pipeline.

== Route ==
The pipeline consists of three sections with a total length of 678 kilometres (421 mi). The 569 kilometres (354 mi) long offshore section starts at the Itoki terminal in southeastern Nigeria and runs through the waters of Benin, Togo and Ghana parallel to the coastline, approximately 15 kilometres (9.3 mi) to 20 kilometres (12 mi) offshore in water depths of between 30 metres (98 ft) and 75 metres (246 ft). The Nigerian onshore section of the pipeline connects the offshore section compressor station at Lagos Beach with the Chevron-owned Escravos–Lagos Pipeline System, operational since 1989. It is possible that later the WAGP will be extended to Côte d'Ivoire and in longer term even to Senegal.

== Technical description ==
The diameter of the onshore section is 30 inches (760 mm). The diameter of the offshore pipeline is 20 inches (510 mm) and the capacity is 5 billion cubic meter (bcm) of natural gas per year. The pipeline was constructed by Willbros, with Bredero Shaw Ltd applying a concrete coating to the pipeline at its facility in Tema, Ghana. The pre-commissioning services were provided by BJ Process and Pipeline Services. The total pipeline costs around US$974 million, for which the World Bank provided a guarantee of $50 million for Ghana, while the Multilateral Investment Guarantee Agency provided a $75 million political risk guarantee for WAGPo as a whole.

== Project company ==
The pipeline is owned by West African Gas Pipeline Company Limited (WAGPCo), a consortium of Chevron (36.7%), Nigerian National Petroleum Corporation (25%), Royal Dutch Shell (18%), Volta River Authority of Ghana (16.3%), Société Togolaise de Gaz (SoToGaz - 2%) and Société Beninoise de Gaz S.A. (SoBeGaz - 2%). The managing director of the company is Walter Perez. It is operated by Chevron Corporation.

== Consumers ==
In Ghana, provided gas was intended for the Takoradi Power Station at Aboadze near Takoradi, operated by Volta River Authority and the Takoradi International Company's (TICO). As of 2014, however, most of the gas was being consumed in Lagos.

== Controversy ==
Environmental group Friends of the Earth has criticized the project, after local communities in Nigeria complained it would damage land, destroy livelihoods and pollute fishing areas.

== Damage by Pirates ==
On 27 August 2012, the West African Gas Pipeline was damaged when pirates who had tried to board an oil tanker in an attempt to get away from the pursuing Togolese Navy, severely damaged the pipeline with their anchor. For nearly a year, the supply of gas to Ghana, Togo and Benin ceased, causing major power supply problems to the affected countries.
