= List of power stations in Ghana =

The following page lists power stations in Ghana.

== Thermal power stations ==
Power station	Community	Coordinates	Type	Capacity (MW)	Year completed	Additional description	Ref
Takoradi Thermal Power Station (T1)	Takoradi	4.971667°N 1.657228°W	Light crude oil or natural gas	330	2000	A total of 330 MW is generated; four gas turbines and a steam turbine	
Kpone Thermal Power Station II	Kpone	5.673900°N 0.037500°E	Natural gas or diesel fuel or crude oil	340	2017 (expected)	Biggest independent power plant in Africa to date	
Kpone Thermal Power Station I	Kpone	5.734998°N 0.010548°E	Natural gas and diesel fuel	230	2016 (expected)	Owned by Volta River Authority	
Tema Thermal Power Station	Tema	5.677362°N 0.015828°E	Diesel fuel	70	2008	54 Caterpillar 3516B diesel power generators. 50MW initially installed followed by an additional 20 MW.	
Sonon Asogli Thermal Power Station	Kpone	5.68029°N 0.047368°E	Natural gas	200	2010	Maximum installed capacity of 200 MW. Often output is less than maximum.	
Karpowership	Tema		Natural gas	470			
Takoradi 3 (T3) Thermal Plant	Takoradi		Natural gas or light crude oil	132			
Anwomaso 1 Thermal Power	Anwomaso - Kumasi		Natural gas	150	2024		
AKSA Power Plant	Accra			370	2017	Oil fired power plant	
AKSA Power Plant	Kumasi		HFO and natural gas	350	2025		
Twin City Energy Power Plant	Aboadze		Natural gas or crude oil	200			
Tema CENIT Thermal Power Plant	Tema		Natural gas	126	2012		
Kpone Independent Power Plant	Tema		Natural gas	350		Combined cycle gas turbine	

== Hydroelectric power stations ==
Hydroelectric station	Community	Coordinates	Type	Capacity (MW)	Year completed	Name of reservoir	River
Akosombo Hydroelectric Power Station	Ajena	6.299722°N 0.059444°E	Reservoir	1,038	1965	Lake Volta	River Volta
Bui Hydroelectric Power Station	Bui Gorge	8.278602°N 2.236935°W	Reservoir	400	2013		Black Volta River
Kpong Hydroelectric Power Station	Akuse	6.119989°N 0.125000°E	Reservoir	160	1982		River Volta

== Solar power stations ==
Solar power station	Community	Coordinates	Capacity (MWp)	Year completed	Owner	Notes
Nzema Solar Power Station	Aiwiaso Village	6.155567°N 2.419711°W	155	2022–2023 (expected)	Blue Energy Plc	Seeking EPC proposals
BXC Solar Power Station	Onyandze, Gomoa West District, Central Region, Ghana	5.372778°N 0.693333°W	20	2016	Beijing Xiaocheng Company	Operational
Gomoa Onyaadze Solar Power Station	Onyandze, Gomoa West District, Central Region, Ghana	5.346111°N 0.703333°W	20	2018	Meinergy Ghana Limited	Operational
Navrongo Solar Power Station	Navrongo	10.880000°N 1.102778°W	2.5	2013	Volta River Authority	Operational
Kaleo Solar Power Station (A)	Kaleo	10.174167°N 2.533611°W	13	2022	Volta River Authority	Operational
Kaleo Solar Power Station (B)	Kaleo		15		Volta River Authority	Operational
Bui Floating Solar Power Plant	Bui		5		Bui Power Authority	Operational
Bui Land Based Solar Power Station	Bui		100	2020	Bui Power Authority	Operational
Lawra Solar Plant	Lawra		6.5		Volta River Authority	Operational

== See also ==
- Electricity in Ghana
- List of largest power stations in the world
- List of power stations in Africa
