= Sunon Asogli Thermal Power Station =

Natural gas-powered power plant in Ghana

- Location of Sunon Asogli Thermal Power Station in Ghana
- Country: Ghana
- Location: Kpone, Tema
- Coordinates: 05°40′49″N 00°02′50″E
- Status: Operational
- Commission date: 2010
- Owner: Sunon Asogli Power Ghana Limited

Thermal power station
- Primary fuel: Natural gas
- Secondary fuel: Butane
- Tertiary fuel: Diesel fuel

Power generation
- Nameplate capacity: 560 MW (750,000 hp)

Sunon Asogli Thermal Power Station, also known as Asogli Thermal Power Station, is a 560 MW natural gas–fired thermal power station in Ghana. It is privately owned by Sunon Asogli Power Ghana Limited and was the first privately owned electricity generation installation in the history of Ghana. The station ranks among the nation's top five terminal power plants.

In October 2024, Sunon Asogli Power Ghana Limited announced the suspension of its 560 MW plant, effective October 8, citing the Electricity Company of Ghana’s (ECG) failure to honor overdue payment obligations. As of the end of September 2024, ECG owed approximately US $259 million (excluding fuel)—a 23 % increase in receivables since January—while only around 22.6 % of invoices had been settled via the Cash Waterfall Mechanism.

== Location ==
It is located in the Kpone neighborhood of the port city of Tema, approximately 35 kilometres (22 mi), by road, east of the central business district of Ghana's capital city, Accra. The geographical coordinates of Sunon Asogli Thermal Power Station are:05°40'49.0"N, 0°02'50.0"E (Latitude:5.680278; Longitude:0.047222).

== International Collaborations ==
Togbe acknowledges that development should not rest solely on the government. He also highlights the importance of Ghana leveraging international resources, including expertise, to drive its progress.

== Overview ==
The power station, which came online in 2010, is privately owned by Sunon Asogli Power Ghana Limited. The table below illustrates the shareholding in the stock of Sunon Asogli Power Ghana Limited.

Sunon Asogli Power Ghana Limited Shareholding
Rank	Name of Owner	Percentage Ownership
1	Shenzhen Energy Group Limited	60.0
2	China-Africa Development Fund	40.0

The power station was built in phases. The first phase, with installed capacity of 200 megawatts, was completed in 2010. Often output was less than maximum.

== Expansion ==
The table below illustrates the three phases of construction of the power station. After Phase One, Phase Two and Phase Three were implemented in succession.

Phased Construction of Sunon Asogli Thermal Power Station
Phase	Installed MW	New Capacity MW	Year Completed
1	200	200	2010
2	180	380	2016
3	180	560	2018

In April 2020, Sunon Asogli Thermal Power Station and the Ghana Grid Company Limited completed the installation of a 330/161 KV interconnecting Auto Transformer at this power station. The new switchgear allows evacuation of more generated electricity with less technical power loss. The project cost US$5.4 million, with Sunon Asogli Power Station contributing US$2 million and Ghana Grid Company contributing the rest.

== See also ==
- List of power stations in Ghana
- Electricity sector in Ghana
