= Nzema Solar Power Station =

Solar power plant in Ghana

- Country: Ghana
- Location: Awiaso Village; Ellembelle District; Western Region, Ghana
- Coordinates: 5.0076962°N 2.419722°W
- Status: Under construction
- Construction began: 2016
- Commission date: 2026 Expected
- Owner: Blue Energy Plc.

Solar farm
- Type: Flat-panel PV

Power generation
- Nameplate capacity: (planned) 155 MW (208,000 hp)

Nzema Solar Power Station is a 155 megawatts (208,000 hp) solar power plant, under construction in Ghana. If completed, the power station will be the largest solar power installation on the African continent.

As of December 2024, the Nzema Solar Power Station in Ghana remains incomplete. Initially, it was envisioned to be one of Africa’s largest solar photovoltaic power plants with a 155 MW capacity. However, challenges in securing adequate financing and sustained project delays have prevented its completion. It may reach completion in 2026, unless there are further delays.

== Location ==
The power station is located in Awiaso Village, Ellembelle District (formerly part of Nzema East District), in the Western Region of Ghana, approximately 272 kilometres (169 mi), by road north of the port city of Takoradi. This location lies approximately 100 kilometres (62 mi), by road, east of the international border with Ivory Coast.

== Overview ==
The power station will use a total of 630,000 solar photo voltaic (PV) modules which, when struck by sunlight, will generate direct current (DC) electricity. Using inverters, the DC will be converted to alternating current (AC), which will be fed in the national electricity grid, to power an estimated 100,000 homes. When completed, it will raise Ghana's national electricity generating capacity by 6%.

== Developers ==
The developer/owner of the power plant is Blue Energy Plc., a United Kingdom-based renewable energy developer. The company, has received regulatory approval from the Energy Commission and the Public Utilities Regulatory Commission, the two electricity regulators in Ghana. A generation licence and a guaranteed feed-in tariff of US$0.20 per kWh for the plant's 20-year operational life have been secured. A power purchase agreement with the national electrical supplier ECG, has also been secured. Mere Power Nzema Limited, a special vehicle subsidiary of Blue Energy Plc., has been formed to develop, build, operate and own the power station. It has leased 183 hectares (450 acres) near the village of Aiwiaso in the Western Region of Ghana for a period of 50 years to build the power station.

== Costs, funding and timeline ==
Nzema is budgeted to cost approximately US$400 million. Blue Energy plans to source that capital from International financial institutions, multilateral lenders, equity partners and own capital. With a guaranteed purchase price of US$0.20 per kWh, the power plant is expected to break even in about 11 years. Construction is expected to be complete in October 2016.

== See also ==
- List of power stations in Ghana
- Electricity sector in Ghana
