= Zumbenti Festival =

Festival in Ghana by the people of Kaleo

Zumbenti Festival is an annual festival celebrated by the chiefs and people of Kaleo in the Nadowli district in the Upper West Region of Ghana. It is usually celebrated in the month of April. Others also claim it is celebrated in May.

== Celebrations ==
During the festival, visitors are welcomed to share food and drinks. The people put on traditional clothes and there is durbar of chiefs. There is also dancing and drumming.

== Significance ==
This festival is celebrated to give thanks to their ancestral gods, cleansing of the land of evil spirits and pacification of gods and re-uniting of families. It is also considered the favorable time to contract marriages.
