= Takoradi Thermal Power Station =

Power station in Sekondi-Takoradi, Ghana

Takoradi Power Station
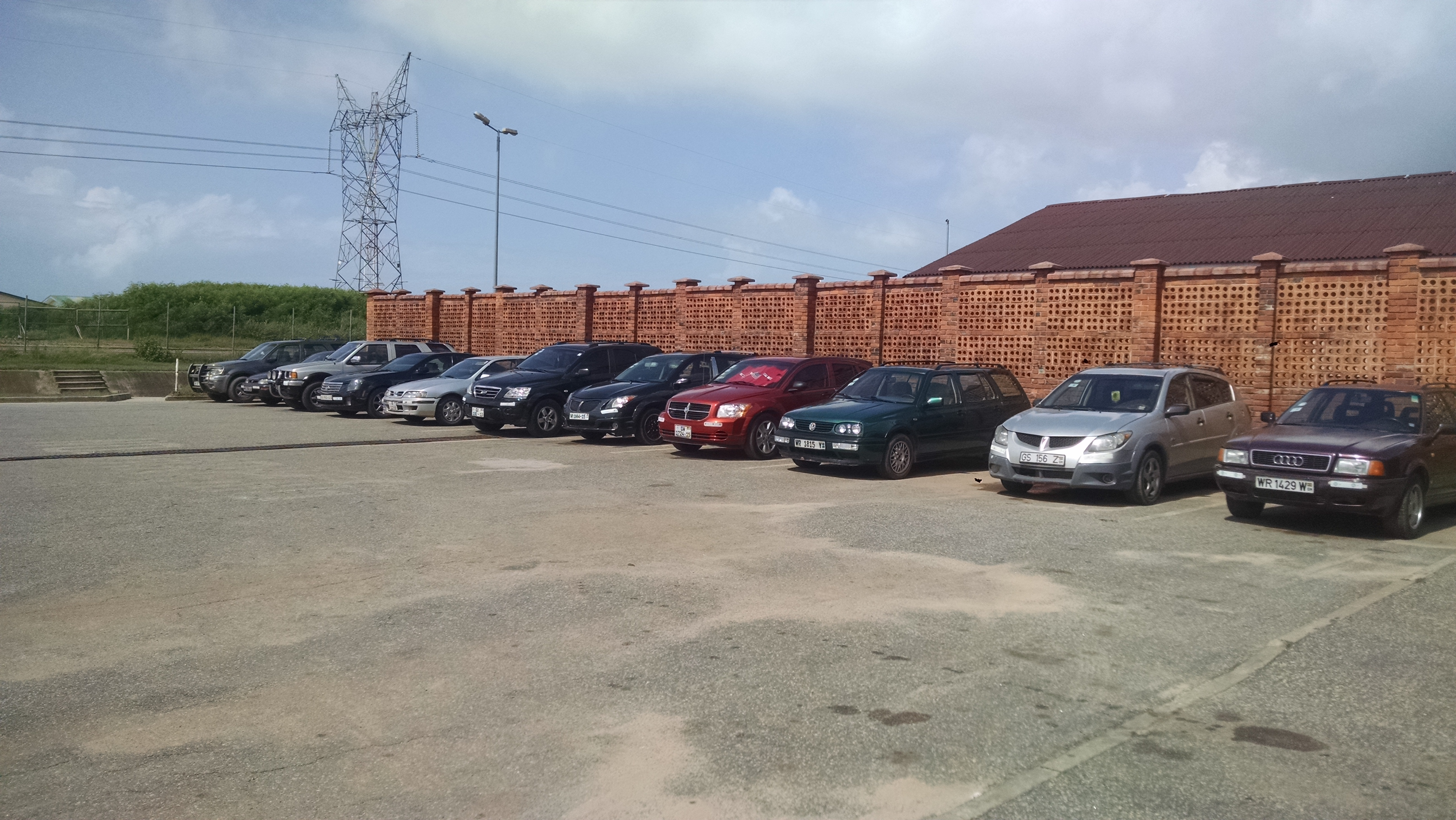
- Country: Ghana
- Location: Aboadze
- Coordinates: 4°58′18″N 1°39′26″W
- Status: Operational
- Owners: Volta River Authority; Takoradi International Company

Thermal power station
- Primary fuel: Light crude oil
- Secondary fuel: Distillate fuel oil
- Tertiary fuel: Natural gas
- Combined cycle?: Yes

Power generation
- Nameplate capacity: 550 MW; 682 MW (Planned)

The Takoradi Power Station is a thermal power station at Aboadze, 17 kilometres (11 mi) east of Sekondi-Takoradi, Ghana. It consists of three power plants.

The Aboadze power station became operational in 1997 and is the first fossil fuel power station operated by the Volta River Authority. Official inauguration was held on 15 October 2000 in participation of President Jerry Rawlings. It is a combined cycle power plant with an installed capacity of 330 MW combined by two 110 MW GE Frame 9E combustion gas turbines, and one 110 MW steam turbine generator. The plant is fueled primarily by light crude oil. Oil is received through a single point mooring connected to the plant by approximately 4.5-kilometre (2.8 mi) undersea pipeline. Oil is stored in four storage tanks with a capacity of 29,500 cubic metres (1,040,000 cu ft) each. The secondary fuel is distillate fuel oil, which is used for start-up and shutdown of the plant. As the plant has dual firing capacity, it can run also on natural gas.

The second plant has a capacity of 220 MW, with a future expansion up to 330 MW. It is owned and operated by Takoradi International Company, a joint venture of the Volta River Authority (10%) and CMS Generation, a subsidiary of TAQA.

The third plant will be a 132 MW combined cycle power plant. It will consist of four gas turbines, heat recovery steam generators and one steam turbine. The plant will be operated by the Volta River Authority. Engineering, Procurement, and Construction (EPC) for the project is being carried out by HPI, LLC in consortium with S&W Solutions, both Texas companies. Its cost is $185 million.

== See also ==
- List of power stations in Ghana
- Electricity sector in Ghana
