= Shuwaikh Port =

- Location in Kuwait
- Native name: ميناء الشويخ

Location
- Country: Kuwait
- Location: Shuwaikh
- Coordinates: 29.3525°N 47.925278°E

Details
- Owned by: Kuwait Ports Authority
- Type of harbour: Seaport
- Size of harbour: 1.2m sq. meters
- Land area: 3.2m sq. meters
- Size: Medium
- No. of berths: 21
- No. of piers: 21

Shuwaikh Port (Arabic: ميناء الشويخ, transliteration : Minaa' Shuweekh) (Coordinates:29°21′9″N 47°55′31″E) is an urban industrial area within the Al Asimah Governorate (Capital Governorate) in Kuwait City, Kuwait.

A number of Kuwait's ports, educational institutions, hospitals and several offices are located in the area. The major cargo ports are at Shuwaikh Port. In the 2011 census, 185 people were recorded as living in the district. The port is bordered by the industrial area, Shuwaikh proper, the educational district and the commercial district.

== Shuwaikh Industrial Area ==
The core industrial area of Al-Shuwaikh (Coordinates: 29°21′N 47°57′E / 29.35°N 47.95°E / 29.35; 47.95) contains the Friday market (Souq al-Juma) at Al-Rai place (Fourth Ring Road). It starts every Thursday in the afternoon and goes until Friday evening and sells clothes, accessories, furniture, carpets, animals, plants, antiques and souvenirs and new and used goods.

The area is known as the industrial section of Kuwait as most manufacturers can be found in that area. Car repairs are mostly located in this part of Kuwait. Also many car dealerships are located in this area. Houses in this area are usually from old times. The electric power station and water desalinization plant in the Port of Shuwaikh supply Kuwait city.

The Kuwait Free Trade Zone is located on Jamal Abdul Nasser road which connects Shuwaikh Port to the centre of Kuwait City.

Several hospitals can be found in Shuwaikh region – such as Al-Sabah Hospital and The Chest Hospital.

Other important places are the Gulf Bank of Kuwait, City Center shopping, KGL Transports, etc. Several major car dealer showrooms can be found in Shuwaikh Industrial Area.

Damaged battleships, Fishing trawlers and dhows from pre-Gulf War eras can be found along the shorelines near Shuwaikh Port.

== The Port of Shuwaikh ==
Ash-Shuwaykh Lighthouse
- Location: Shuwaikh Port, Kuwait
- Coordinates: 29°21′30″N 47°55′54″E

Tower
- Foundation: concrete base
- Construction: reinforced concrete port control building with light atop
- Shape: 3-storey square prism building
- Markings: white building
- Operator: Kuwait Ports Authority

Light
- Characteristic: Fl(2) W 15s

The Port of Shuwaikh (also Ash-Ashuwaykh) is Kuwait's most important port. Located immediately west of the centre of Kuwait City, it lies on the southern shores of Kuwait Bay off the Persian Gulf.

The Kuwait Ports Authority manages and operates the Port of Shuwaikh. The Port of Shuwaikh serves ocean-going vessels at its deep-water berths, and it has ample modern container facilities. It is the country's most important commercial port and covers 320 hectares of land and 120 hectares of water surface. The Navigation Channel inside Kuwait Bay is dredged to a depth of 8.5 meters (minimum tide level), and it is about eight kilometers long. At any tide, the Port of Shuwaikh can receive vessels to 7.5 meters draft. At high tide, vessels to 9.5 meters draft can enter and leave the Port of Shuwaikh. The Port of Shuwaikh contains 21 berths with a total length of 4055 meters. Fourteen of the berths have a depth of 10 meters, four are 8.5 meters deep, and three have alongside depth of 6.7 meters. Cargo vessels travelling through the Port of Shuwaikh include merchant ships and other vessels that include liners, tramps, fishing trawlers, and small passenger ships as well as cargo-laden container and roll-on/roll-off vessels and barges.

Address	P.O Box 3874 Safat 13039 Kuwait
Phone	+965-4812622
Fax	+965-4819714
Web Site	www.kpa.gov.kw
UN/LOCODE	KWSWK
Port Type, Size	Seaport, Medium

== Emergency Peaking Power Shuwaikh (EPPS) ==
In 2008, the Kuwaiti Ministry of Energy (MOE) signed a $270 Million dollar contract to build a 200 MW power plant, making it the largest aeroderivative engine power plant of its kind in the Middle East. The Engineering, Procurement and Construction (EPC) efforts were contracted to HPI, LLC, a full service power and turbine controls company in Houston, S&W Energy Solutions Inc. (SWES), an engineering firm, and Alghanim International (AI), a large Kuwaiti civil and electromechanical contractor. The power plant was built to assure a supply of electrical power to Kuwait City during the peak power usage months.

== Kuwait University ==
The Kuwait University Campus, which is a public university is located close to the port, which is the main campus with several extensions in Mubarak-Al-Kabeer, Khaldiya and Jabriya. The campus at Shuwaikh incorporates the residential quarters for university staff as well.

Entertainment facilities are available with swimming pools, gaming arenas, tennis courts, basketball courts and much more and a cinema played every Thursday evening at the University Faculty member's club.

== Transport ==
Most areas in Kuwait are well connected by public transport buses with two major corporations, City Bus and Kuwait Public Transport Company (KPTC) running services throughout the day, though public transports are used by few people only.

Kuwait International Airport is the primary airport for the country serving a wide variety of local and international destinations. Shuwaikh Port is directly connected with the Kuwait International Airport via the Ghazali Expressway(Road-60).

== See also ==
- List of lighthouses in Kuwait
- List of United Kingdom Military installations used during Operation Telic
