= Effasu =

Effasu (or Effasu-Mangyea) is a farming community in the Jomoro District in the Western Region of Ghana, about 150 km west of Takoradi. The Osagyefo Barge is located at Effasu.
