= Emmanuel Kwaku Boam =

Ghanaian politician

Hon. Emmanuel Kwaku Boam
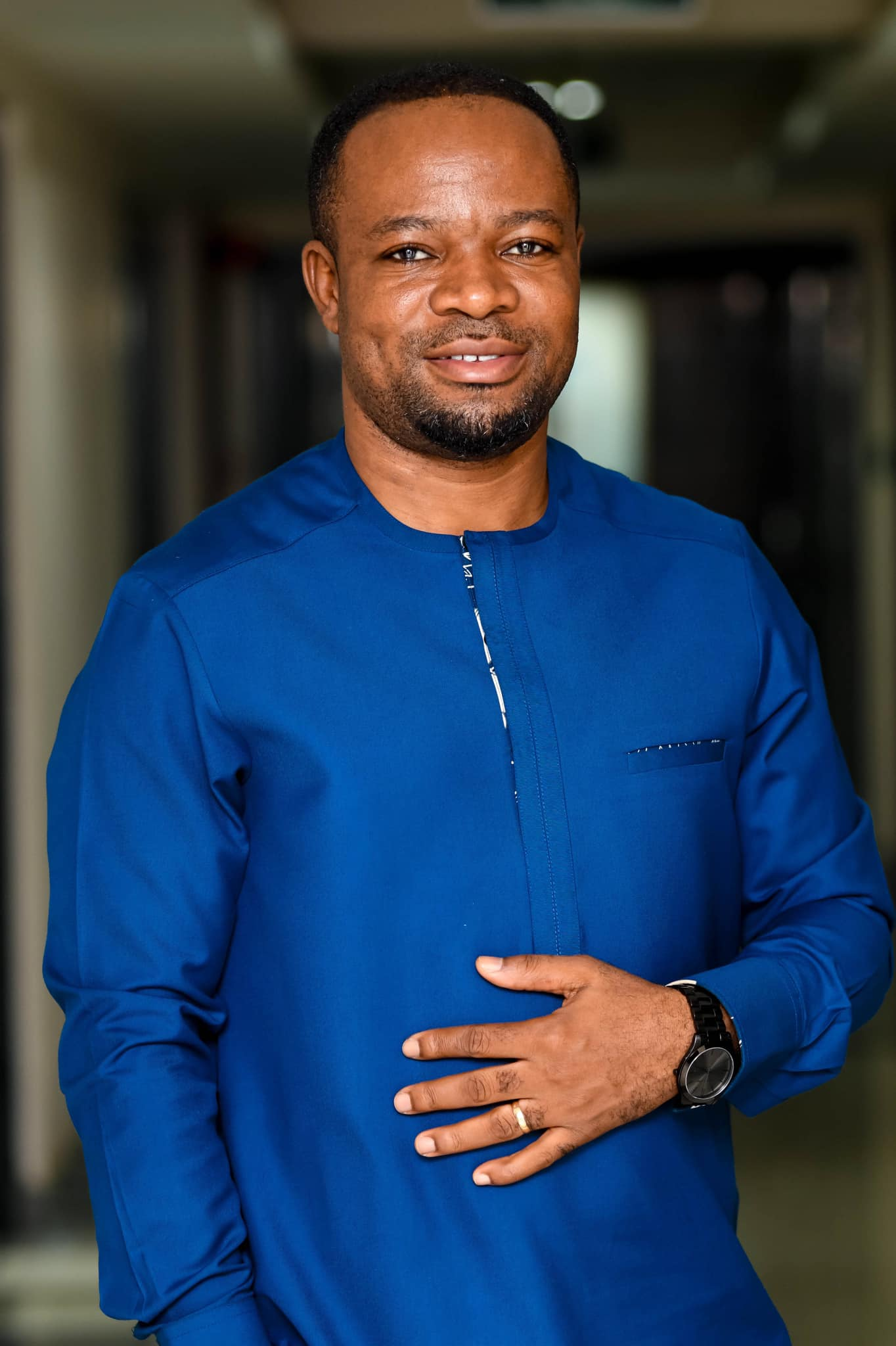

Member of the Ghana Parliament for Pru East
- Incumbent
- Assumed office 7 January 2025
- Preceded by: Kwabena Donkor

Personal details
- Born: Emmanuel Kwaku Boam; 3 October 1984 (age 41)
- Party: National Democratic Congress
- Education: Kwame Nkrumah University of Science and Technology; Kumasi Technical University
- Occupation: Politician

Emmanuel Kwaku Boam (born 3 October 1984) is a Ghanaian politician and member of the National Democratic Congress (NDC). He serves as the Member of Parliament for the Pru East constituency in the Bono East Region of Ghana.

== Early life and education ==
Emmanuel Kwaku Boam was born on 3 October 1984 in Yeji, Ghana.

He attended Kumasi Technical University to earn his HND in Accountancy and a Bachelor's degree in Computerized Accounting in 2008 and 2011 respectively. Eventually, he attended KNUST to earn his Master's degree in Industrial Finance & Investments.

== Political career ==
Boam is a member of the National Democratic Congress (NDC). In the NDC primaries held on 13 May 2023, he contested and won the candidacy for the Pru East constituency, defeating the incumbent MP, Dr. Kwabena Donkor and secueed the parliamentary seat later.

== Personal life ==
Boam is a Christian.
