= BXC Solar Power Station =

Ghanaian solar farm

- Country: Ghana
- Location: Gomoa Onyandze, Gomoa West District, Central Region
- Coordinates: 05°22′22″N 00°41′36″W
- Status: Operational
- Commission date: April 2016
- Construction cost: US$30 million
- Owner: Beijing Xiaocheng Company
- Operator: Beijing Xiaocheng Company

Solar farm
- Type: Flat-panel PV
- Site area: 100 acres (40 ha)

Power generation
- Nameplate capacity: 20 MW (27,000 hp)

BXC Solar Power Station, also Onyandze Solar Power Station, is an operational 20 megawatt solar power plant in Ghana. The solar farm was developed, financed and is owned and operated by Beijing Xiaocheng Company, a Chinese independent power producer (IPP). The power station, commercially commissioned in April 2016, was the largest grid-ready IPP solar farm in Ghana, at that time. The energy generated at this power station is evacuated via a high voltage transmission line to a substation at Winneba Roundabout, where it enters the national grid.

== Location ==
The power station is Located on 100 acres (40 ha), in the settlement of Gomoa Onyandze, in Gomoa West District, in the Central Region of Ghana, close to the town of Otaw, Ghana. This is about 11 kilometres (7 mi), west of Winneba, the nearest large town. Otaw is located approximately 71 kilometres (44 mi) west of Accra, the capital and largest city of Ghana. The geographical coordinates of BXC Solar Power Station are 05°22'22.0"N, 0°41'36.0"W (Latitude: 5.372778; Longitude:-0.693333). This solar farm is in close proximity to the 20 megawatt Gomoa Onyaadze Solar Power Station.

== Overview ==
The power station has an installed maximum generation capacity of 20 megawatts, although the owner/developers have plans of expanding generation capacity to 40 megawatts. The energy generated here is conveyed via a high voltage transmission line from the power station to a substation belonging to Power Distribution Services Ghana (PDSG), formerly Electricity Company of Ghana (ECG), where the energy enters the national grid. A long-term power purchase agreement, between PDSG and the owner/operators of the power station governs the terms of sale and purchase of the energy.

== Ownership ==
The BXC Solar Power Station is owned by Beijing Xiaocheng Company (BXC), an electronics and technology company, based in Beijing, China. The parent company has a Ghanaian subsidiary, BXC Ghana Limited. The parent funded and constructed the solar farm. The local subsidiary operates and manages the power station.

=== Challenges ===
Ghana's renewable energy projects, including BXC Solar, face issues such as delayed payments from ECG, limited financing for expansion, and regulatory bottlenecks.

== Funding ==
The cost of construction is reported to be US$30 million, incurred by the developer/owners of the power plant.

== See also ==
- List of power stations in Ghana
