= Datuko =

Community in Upper East Region, Ghana

- Town
- Location of Datuko in Upper East Region
- Coordinates: 10°42′55.04″N 00°38′55″W
- Country: Ghana
- Region: Upper East Region
- District: Talensi District
- Time zone: UTC0 (GMT)

Datuko is a community in the Talensi District of the Upper East Region of Ghana. As at 2026, the community has a population of 6,500. The Chief of the community is Naab Nubil Pelig Ku Sua Yebig.
