= Kaleo, Ghana =

Town in Ghana

Kaleo
- Town
- Location within Ghana
- Coordinates: 10°10′25″N 02°32′31″W
- Country: Ghana
- Region: Upper West Region
- District: Nadowli-Kaleo District
- Elevation: 1,030 ft (314 m)
- Time zone: GMT
  - Summer (DST): GMT

Kaleo is a small town in Ghana.

== Location ==
The town is located in Nadowli-Kaleo District, in the Upper West Region of Ghana, close to the border with Burkina Faso. Kaleo is located about 27.5 kilometres (17 mi) southeast of the town of Nadowli, the district headquarters. This is approximately 18.5 kilometres (11 mi) northwest of the city of Wa, the capital of Ghana's Upper West Region. Kaleo is located approximately 714 kilometres (444 mi) northwest of Accra the capital and largest city of Ghana. The geographical coordinates of Kaleo, Ghana are:10°10'25.0"N, 2°32'31.0"W (Latitude:10.173611; Longitude:-2.541944). The town sits at an average elevation of 314 metres (1,030 ft) above mean sea level.

== Electricity ==
Kaleo is the location of Kaleo Solar Power Station. The power station, which was developed in phases, saw the completion of phase one, with capacity of 13 MW, in 2022. Phase two is expected to come online in 2023 and add another 15 MW to the power station's generation capacity, for a total of 28 MW. The solar farm was developed and is owned by the Volta River Authority.

== Transport ==
The Wa–Lawra Road (Highway N2), connecting the regional capital to the town of Lawra at the border with Burkina Faso, runs through the middle of Kaleo in a general north to south direction.

== See also ==
- Zumbenti Festival
