= Akanyaru Multipurpose Dam =

Multipurpose dam in Burundi and Rwanda

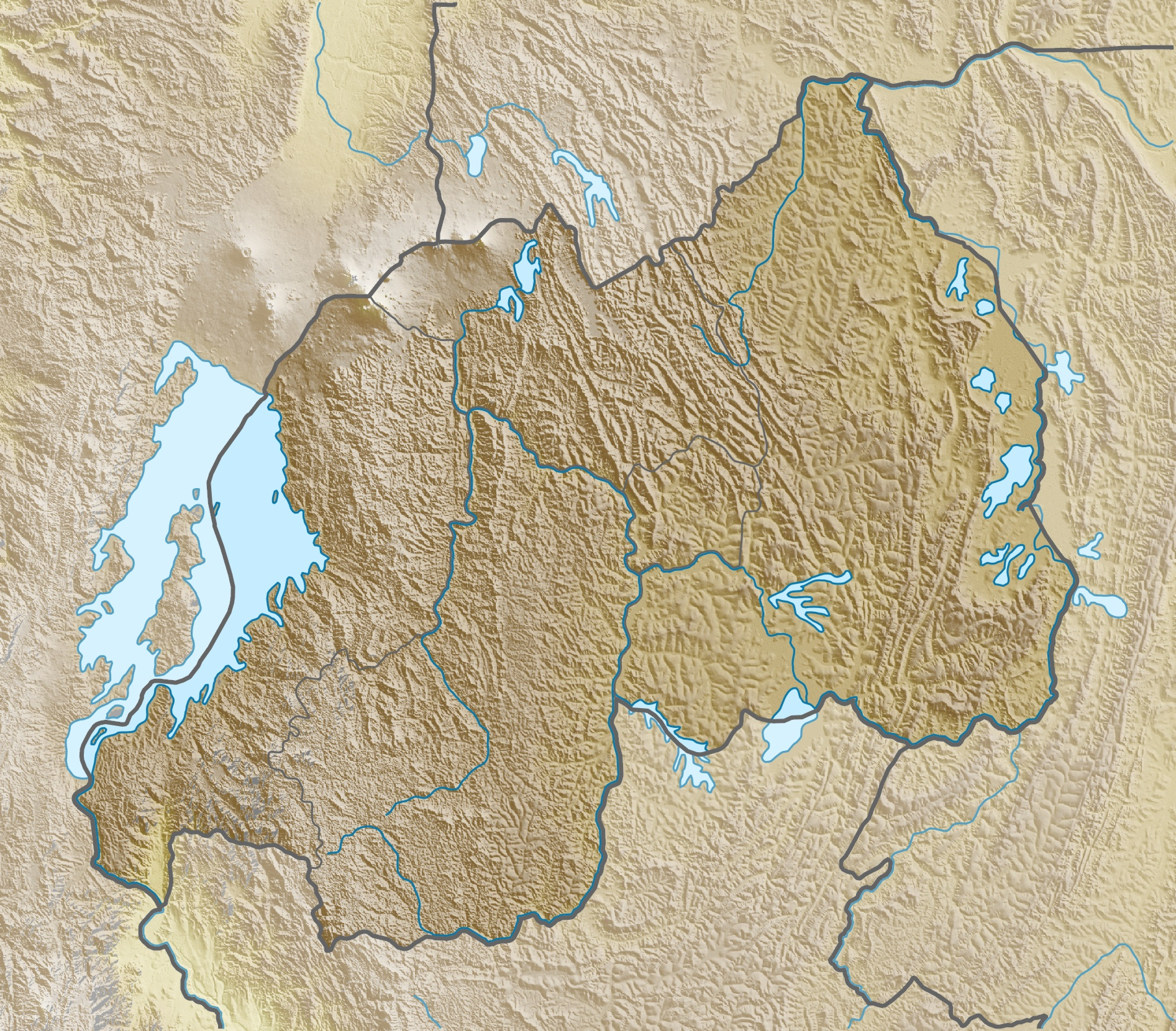
- Map of Rwanda showing the location of Akanyaru Multipurpose Dam
- Country: Rwanda
- Location: Akanyaru River, Gisagara District, Southern Province
- Coordinates: 02°37′25″S 29°55′51″E
- Purpose: Drinking, Irrigation & Power
- Status: Proposed
- Construction began: 2022 Expected
- Opening date: 2025 Estimate
- Construction cost: US $190 million

Dam and spillways
- Impounds: Akanyaru River
- Height: 50 metres (164 ft)
- Dam volume: 333,000,000 cubic metres (1.1759784018×10^{10} cu ft)

Reservoir
- Normal elevation: 1,400 m (4,600 ft)

Power Station
- Commission date: 2025 (expected)
- Turbines: 2
- Installed capacity: 14.5 MW (19,400 hp)

The Akanyaru Multipurpose Dam, is a planned dam across the Akanyaru River, at the international border between Rwanda and Burundi. The dam will create a reservoir with storage capacity of 333,000,000 cubic metres (1.1759784018×10^{10} cu ft). The water is expected to supply drinking water to an estimated 614,200 people in both countries. The reservoir is also expected to provide irrigation water to an estimated 12,474 hectares (30,820 acres) of agricultural land in Burundi and Rwanda, benefitting an estimated 24,948 farmers. The dam will also host Akanyaru Hydroelectric Power Station, with generating capacity of 14.5 MW (19,400 hp).

== Location ==
The power station would be on the Akanyaru River, along Rwanda's border with Burundi, in present-day Gisagara District in Southern Province, Rwanda and in Commune of Ntega in Kirundo Province, Burundi.

The dam is approximately 160 kilometres (99 mi), by road, southwest of Kigali, the capital city of Rwanda. This is about 150 kilometres (93 mi), by road, north of Gitega, the capital city of Burundi.

== History ==
In 2012, the two East African countries and the Nile Equatorial Lakes Subsidiary Action Program (NELSAP), identified the Akanyaru Multipurpose Water Resources Development Project. That year, NELSAP carried out pre-feasibility studies.

In 2015, the Nile Council of Ministers approved the Akanyaru Project. Delegations from Rwanda and Burundi appraised the project site in May 2016. In March 2018, NELSAP prepared a full funding proposal to the African Development Bank (AfDB). In 2020, tenders were floated for full Environmental and social impact assessment (ESIA) studies, Resettlement Action Plan (RAP), full feasibility studies, detailed design and preparation of tender documents for the project were initiated. Project studies are expected to conclude in March 2022.

== Funding ==
In February 2021, the project cost was calculated at US$190 million. Loan application was made to the AfDB, under its NEPAD Infrastructure Project Preparation Facility (NEPAD-IPPF).

== Other considerations ==
The proposed 14.5 megawatts (19,400 hp) Akanyaru Hydroelectric Power Station, is expected to supply electricity to 141,111 homes in both countries, serving an estimated 846,000 people. The project also involves the restoration of degraded watersheds upstream of the Akanyaru Dam.

== See also ==
- List of power stations in Rwanda
- List of power stations in Burundi
- Pwalugu Multipurpose Dam
