= Santeng =

Community in Upper East Region, Ghana

- Town
- Country: Ghana
- Region: Upper East Region
- District: Talensi District
- Time zone: UTC0 (GMT)

Santeng is a mining community in the Talensi District of the Upper East Region of Ghana.
