= Kpong Airfield =

Airport in Eastern Ghana

- IATA: none; ICAO: none

Summary
- Location: Near Kpong Dam in the Eastern Region of Ghana
- Opened: November 2005
- Coordinates: 6.1149°N 0.0578°E
- Interactive map of Kpong Airfield

Kpong Airfield first opened in November 2005. It is the busiest private airfield in West Africa with active light aviation movements most days. It has two grass runways: 19/01 (800 m (2,600 ft)) and 29/11 (200 m (660 ft)). They are located 3 km (1.9 mi) south of the small lake created by Kpong Dam in the Eastern Region of Ghana, and 50 km (31 mi) north of Tema.
