= Energy Commission (Ghana) =

Ghanaian energy parastatal

- Industry: Energy
- Founded: 1997; 29 years ago
- Headquarters: Ghana Airways Avenue, Airport Residential Area, Accra, Ghana
- Owner: Government of Ghana
- Website: www.energycom.gov.gh

The Energy Commission is a parastatal, mandated by law to regulate and manage the development and utilization of energy resources in Ghana, specifically in electricity licensing, renewable energy, natural gas and energy efficiency.

== History ==
The Energy Commission of Ghana was founded by the enactment of an Act of the Parliament of Ghana, Energy Commission Act, 1997(Act 541).The primary supervisory body for the commission is the Ministry of Energy and Petroleum (Ghana). Its precursor was the National Energy Board, started in 1989.

== Mandate and functions ==
The Energy Commission is made up of seven Commissioners appointed by the President of Ghana with advice from the Council of State. The commissioners provide overall leadership in energy planning, regulation and innovation for the operations of the agency. The parastatal's core responsibilities include regulation, management, development and utilisation of sustainable energy resources in Ghana.

== Renewable energy challenge ==
The Energy Commission of Ghana, in collaboration with the Ghana Education Service, started the Senior High Schools Renewable Energy Challenge in 2019 to promote interest in renewable energy and energy efficiency among second-cycle students.

The initiative educates and raises awareness on renewable energy and efficiency across Senior High and Technical Schools nationwide. It encourages creativity, provides mentorship, and inspires students to explore practical renewable energy solutions. The Challenge also offers a platform for students to showcase innovative projects developed with locally available materials.

=== Winners ===
Year	School
2019	Ebenezer Senior High School
2020	Not held
2021	Mfantsiman Girls' Senior High School
2022	Kpedze Senior High School
2023	Sagakofe Senior High School
2024	Kpando Senior High School
2025	Presbyterian Boys' Senior School

== See also ==
- Energy law
- Ministry of Energy and Petroleum
- Nuclear power in Ghana
