= Petroleum Commission (Ghana) =

Ghanaian energy parastatal

Agency overview
- Formed: 2011
- Jurisdiction: Government of Ghana
- Headquarters: Plot # 4A George Bush Highway, Accra - Tema Motorway, Accra
- Agency executive: Egbert Faibille Jnr., Chief Executive Officer
- Website: petrocom.gov.gh

The Petroleum Commission is a Ghanaian state agency under the Ministry of Energy and Petroleum responsible for the regulation, management and coordination of all activities in the upstream petroleum industry for the benefit and welfare of Ghanaians. The commission was established in 2011 as an independent regulator in the petroleum sector of Ghana.

== History ==
The commission was established in 2011 by an Act of Parliament (Act 821) in consequence of hydrocarbons discovered in commercial quantities. The purpose of the act was for the regulation and management of the utilization of petroleum resources and also to coordinate the policies in the upstream petroleum sector.

== Functions ==
The commission is responsible for monitoring, supervising, inspecting and auditing all petroleum activities in Ghana. The commission is also responsible for registering and receiving registration fees of all industry players of the upstream oil and gas sector of Ghana. The commission also recommends national policies connected to petroleum activities to the Minister of Energy. The commission receives applications and issues licenses for specific business operations in the petroleum field as stated by the petroleum laws and regulations. The commission is also tasked with the promotion of local content and Ghanaian participation in the petroleum industry as stated by the Petroleum Exploration and Production Law of 1984 (PNDCL 84), and other laws and regulations for national development.

== See also ==
- Ministry of Energy and Petroleum
