= Talensi (district) =

Talensi District
- District
- Districts of Upper East Region

- Location of Talensi District within Upper East
- Coordinates: 10°42′11.16″N 0°48′20.16″W
- Country: Ghana
- Region: Upper East
- Capital: Tongo

Population (2021)
  - Total: 87,021
- Time zone: UTC+0 (GMT)
- ISO 3166 code: GH-UE-TL

Talensi District is one of the fifteen districts in Upper East Region, Ghana. Originally it was formerly part of the then-larger Talensi-Nabdam District in August 2004, until the northern part of the district was split off to create Nabdam District on 28 June 2012; thus the remaining part has been renamed as Talensi District. The district assembly is located in the central part of Upper East Region and has Tongo as its capital town.

== Settlements ==
Some towns in the district:

- Awaredone,
- Baare,
- Wakii
- Gbeogo
- Gayei Tindongo
- Yinduri
- Tengzuk
- Gorogo
- Santeng
- Shia
- Duusi
- Damolgo
- Gbane
- Sheaga
- Gana
- Tengzuk
- Yagezoore
- Yamzorko
- Pwalugo
- Datuko
