= Northern Electricity Distribution Company =

Electricity network operator in Ghana

Northern Electricity Department Company
- Abbreviation: NEDco
- Formation: April 1987
- Headquarters: Tamale
- Website: http://www.nedcogh.com/

Northern Electricity Distribution Company (NEDCO) is an electricity distribution utility company in Ghana. The company is a subsidiary of the Volta River Authority, the main electricity generation company in the country. The company is the sole supplier of electricity to the five Northern Regions of Ghana: Northern Region, Upper East Region, Savanna Region, North East Region and Upper West Region, Bono, Bono East, Ahafo Regions and part of the Ashanti and Volta Regions. The Electricity Company of Ghana supplies the other regions.

== History ==
It was established in April 1987. The Upper Area, Northern Area, and Brong-Ahafo Area were the first three functioning areas of NED when it first began.In response to the Power Sector Reforms (PSR) in 1997, NEDCo was formed out of NED and registered by VRA as a subsidiary. NEDCo was operationalized in May 2012 and has its Headquarters in Tamale, the Northern Regional Capital.

The mission of the company is to "procure and distribute electricity efficiently, safely, and reliably in the northern sector of Ghana in a commercially viable manner."

== Operational footprint ==
The operations of NEDCO cover over sixty percent of the total land area of Ghana. Its operations extend into the northern parts of Volta Region and Ashanti Region. It also supplies power to Dapaong in Togo, as well as the border towns of Po, Leo and Yuoga in Burkina Faso.

== See also ==
- Electricity sector in Ghana
