= Pru East (Ghana parliament constituency) =

Constituency in the Bono East Region of Ghana

- constituency for the Parliament of Ghana
- District: Pru District
- Region: Bono East Region of Ghana

Current constituency
- Party: NDC
- MP: Emmanuel Kwaku Boam

Pru East is one of the constituencies represented in the Parliament of Ghana. It was created in 2004. It elects one Member of Parliament (MP) by the first past the post system of election. Pru East is located in the Bono East Region of Ghana.

== Boundaries ==
The seat is located within the Pru District of the Bono East region of Ghana.

== Members of Parliament ==
Election	Member	Party
2024	Emmanuel Kwaku Boam	NDC
2016 2012	Kwabena Donkor	NDC
2008 2004	Masoud Baba Abdul-Rahman	NDC

== Elections ==
Ghanaian parliamentary election, 2016 : Pru East Source : Peacefmonline
Party	Candidate	Votes	%
Ndc	KWABENA DONKOR	13,512	56.19
Npp	AMOAH KING DAVID	8,749	36.38
Ppp	DANJUMAH DESMOND	1,580	6.57
Ndp	ZEVOR MATTHEW TSIDITSEY	130	0.54
Cpp	NOAH KEN BOADAI	75	0.31

2012 Ghanaian parliamentary election : Pru East Source : Peacefmonline
Party	Candidate	Votes	%
Ndc	KWABENA DONKOR	15,906	61.50
Ind	KING-DAVID KWAO AMOAH	6,130	23.70
Npp	ABRAHAM NYIDAVU	3,430	13.26
Ind	KINGSLEY ABONKRAH	148	0.57
Ppp	NYAFULE OWUSU EMMANUEL	125	0.48
Cpp	ADZORMAHE AGBENYA EBENEZER	124	0.48

2008 Ghanaian parliamentary election :Pru East Source : Peacefmonline
Party	Candidate	Votes	%
Ndc	Masoud Baba Abdul-Rahman	13,090	42.14
Npp	ALHAJI GARIBA IDDRISU	8,994	28.95
Ind	AMOAH KING DAVID	8,265	26.61
Dpp	PONADA DONKOR GEORGE EVANS	319	1.03
Dfp	BIJABI JOSES	254	0.82
Cpp	AMEYAW CHARLES	141	0.45

2004 Ghanaian parliamentary election:Pru East Source : Peacefmonline
Party	Candidate	Votes	%
Ndc	Masoud Baba Abdul-Rahman	22,080	63.10
Npp	Amoah King David	12,029	34.40
Pnc	Francis Dorkose Dawuda	555	1.60
Ind	Kingsley K A Abonkrah	305	0.90

== See also ==
- List of Ghana Parliament constituencies
- List of political parties in Ghana
