= Kpong Dam =

Hydroelectric dam in Akuse, Ghana

- Location within Ghana
- Country: Ghana
- Location: Akuse
- Coordinates: 6°7′12″N 0°7′30″E
- Purpose: Hydroelectric
- Status: Operational
- Construction began: 1977
- Opening date: 1982
- Owner: Volta River Authority

Dam and spillways
- Height: 18 metres (59 feet)
- Length: 240 metres (790 feet)

Power Station
- Commission date: 1982
- Type: Run-of-the-river
- Turbines: 4 X 40 MW (54,000 hp) Francis turbines
- Installed capacity: 160 MW (210,000 hp)

The Kpong Dam, also known as the Akuse Dam, is a hydroelectric power generating dam on the lower Volta River near Akuse in Ghana. It is owned and operated by Volta River Authority. It was constructed between 1977 and 1982. Its power station has a capacity of 148 megawatts (198,000 hp) with all four units running, though the total nameplate capacity is 160 megawatts (210,000 hp).

The project supplements power production from Akosombo Dam, for the melting of aluminium at VALCO in Tema. The project is located about 24 kilometres (15 mi) downstream of Akosombo Dam, and is about 80 kilometres (50 mi) from the city of Accra.

Because the reservoir upstream of the dam is relatively small, the plant operates as a "run-of-the-river" project, with river flow controlled at Akosombo. The design head of water at the plant is 11.75 metres (38.5 ft); the low head required the use of unusually large turbines for their power rating, with a Francis runner diameter of 8.2 metres (27 ft). The powerhouse is 148 metres (486 ft) long, 40 metres (130 ft) wide and 64 metres (210 ft). The main dam is made of earth with rockfill facing and is 18 metres (59 ft) high and 240 metres (790 ft) long. Dikes on the banks are 2,100 and 3,500 metres (6,900 and 11,500 ft) long. The spillway has a design capacity of 20,000 cubic metres per second (710,000 cu ft/s) and has 15 radial gates, each 11 metres (36 ft) wide by 13.5 metres (44 ft) high, with a total length of 280 metres (920 ft). The civil contractor for the project was Impregilo of Italy. Other components of the project include a 161 kV switchyard and transmission lines, four villages constructed to house people displaced by the project, and road construction.

In addition to power generation, the project provides irrigation water for agriculture, and municipal water supply. Bilharzia is a health hazard in the region which has increased since the construction of the dam.

== See also ==
- List of power stations in Ghana
- Electricity sector in Ghana
