= Ghana Grid Company =

Electricity transmission network operator in Ghana

Ghana Grid Company is an electricity transmission company in Ghana. GRIDCo was incorporated on December 15, 2006 as a private limited liability company and started operations in 2008 following the transfer of the core staff and power transmission assets from Volta River Authority with a mandate to ensure the provision of transparent, non-discriminatory and open access to the transmission grid for all the participants in the power market particularly, power generators and bulk consumers and thus bring about efficiency in power deliver.

== See also ==
- Electricity sector in Ghana
