= Akuse =

- Town
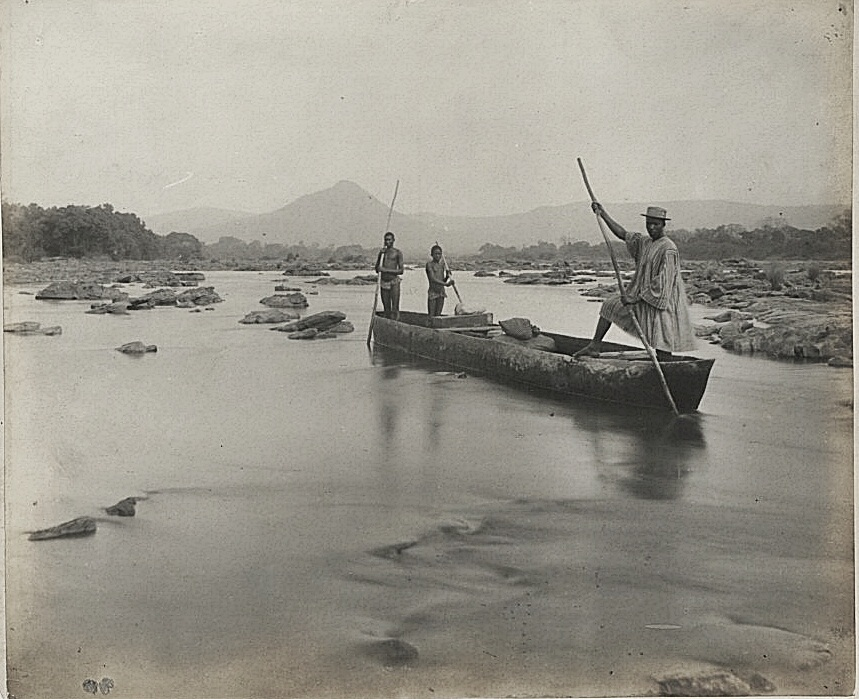
- Canoemen on boat in Volta river above Akuse. From The National Archives UK, 1890's

- Location within Ghana
- Coordinates: 6°06′00″N 0°08′00″W
- Country: Ghana
- Region: Eastern Region
- District: Lower Manya Krobo District
- Elevation: 52 ft (16 m)
- Time zone: GMT
  - Summer (DST): GMT

Akuse is a town in the Lower Manya Krobo district of the Eastern Region of Ghana situated between Tema and Akosombo.

The community hosts a number of public institutions as well including Ghana Prisons, Ghana Health Service, Meteorological Services and Ghana Police Service.

The Kpong Hydro Generation Plant is located in Akuse and managed by the Volta River Authority (VRA).

== Climate ==
Climate data for Akuse (1991-2020)
Month	Jan	Feb	Mar	Apr	May	Jun	Jul	Aug	Sep	Oct	Nov	Dec	Year
Record high °C (°F)	38.2 (100.8)	39.8 (103.6)	39.5 (103.1)	40.0 (104.0)	38.0 (100.4)	36.3 (97.3)	35.1 (95.2)	35.6 (96.1)	35.8 (96.4)	36.3 (97.3)	36.2 (97.2)	37.2 (99.0)	40.0 (104.0)
Mean daily maximum °C (°F)	34.8 (94.6)	36.1 (97.0)	35.6 (96.1)	34.9 (94.8)	33.6 (92.5)	31.8 (89.2)	30.8 (87.4)	30.8 (87.4)	32.0 (89.6)	33.1 (91.6)	34.0 (93.2)	34.2 (93.6)	33.5 (92.3)
Daily mean °C (°F)	28.6 (83.5)	30.3 (86.5)	30.4 (86.7)	30.0 (86.0)	29.0 (84.2)	27.8 (82.0)	26.9 (80.4)	26.8 (80.2)	27.6 (81.7)	28.2 (82.8)	28.7 (83.7)	28.5 (83.3)	28.6 (83.5)
Mean daily minimum °C (°F)	22.5 (72.5)	24.5 (76.1)	25.1 (77.2)	24.9 (76.8)	24.4 (75.9)	23.7 (74.7)	23.1 (73.6)	22.8 (73.0)	23.2 (73.8)	23.2 (73.8)	23.3 (73.9)	22.8 (73.0)	23.6 (74.5)
Record low °C (°F)	12.0 (53.6)	16.0 (60.8)	19.4 (66.9)	19.5 (67.1)	20.0 (68.0)	18.5 (65.3)	16.5 (61.7)	16.5 (61.7)	18.5 (65.3)	19.9 (67.8)	18.0 (64.4)	13.0 (55.4)	12.0 (53.6)
Average precipitation mm (inches)	14.9 (0.59)	26.7 (1.05)	90.2 (3.55)	106.8 (4.20)	161.4 (6.35)	175.9 (6.93)	95.1 (3.74)	37.7 (1.48)	106.4 (4.19)	135.9 (5.35)	69.9 (2.75)	28.2 (1.11)	1,049.1 (41.30)
Average precipitation days (≥ 1.0 mm)	1.2	2.7	6.2	6.3	9.2	9.6	5.8	3.7	8.5	9.6	6.6	2.1	71.5
Average relative humidity (%)	52	52	59	55	64	69	69	68	63	63	60	60	58
Mean monthly sunshine hours	220.1	214.7	217.0	204.0	220.1	135.0	142.6	170.5	147.0	220.1	231.0	244.9	2,367
Mean daily sunshine hours	7.1	7.6	7.0	6.8	7.1	4.5	4.6	5.5	4.9	7.1	7.7	7.9	6.5
Source 1: NOAA
Source 2: Deutscher Wetterdienst (humidity 1973-1994, sun 1958-1962)
