= Power Distribution Services Ghana =

Electricity distribution operator in Ghana

Power Distribution Services Ghana (PDS Ghana Limited), was an electricity distribution company in Ghana. The company's operation covered about thirty percent of the total land mass of the country. Formerly, and as a public company, its operations were under the Ministry of Energy of Ghana. Together with Northern Electricity Distribution Company, they supplied all of Ghana's electricity demands as well as some other West African countries. PDS took over Electricity Company of Ghana (ECG) on 1 March 2019.

The company initiated many periods of load shedding which increased in recent times, and gained traction in popular culture under the term dumsor. Ownership was eventually reverted to the ECG.

The Controversy

The Power Distribution Services (PDS) Ghana Limited takeover was a controversial deal that saw the Ghanaian government award a 25-year concession to PDS to manage the Electricity Company of Ghana (ECG). The deal was signed in March 2019, but was suspended in July 2019 following allegations of fraud. The government subsequently terminated the deal in October 2019.

On June 17, 2025, the Electricity Company of Ghana (ECG) disconnected the Weija treatment plant operated by Ghana Water Company Limited (GWCL) from the national power grid due to an outstanding debt of GH¢999.6 million.

== History ==
Enacted as a result of Parliament's Energy Commission Act of 1997 (Act 541), the Energy Commission assumes a pivotal role in Ghana's energy landscape. Its primary mandate revolves around the meticulous regulation, strategic management, comprehensive development, and optimal utilization of the nation's diverse energy resources. By diligently overseeing these critical aspects, the Energy Commission actively contributes to the sustainable growth and efficient operation of Ghana's energy sector, ensuring its alignment with both national priorities and international best practices.

The Energy Commission is the key regulator for Ghana's energy sectors and advises the government on energy matters. The company's main focus is providing electricity to Ghana's people with commercial integrity and overseeing rural electrification projects for the government.

== See also ==
- Electricity sector in Ghana
