= Electricity sector in Ghana =

Electricity sector of Ghana
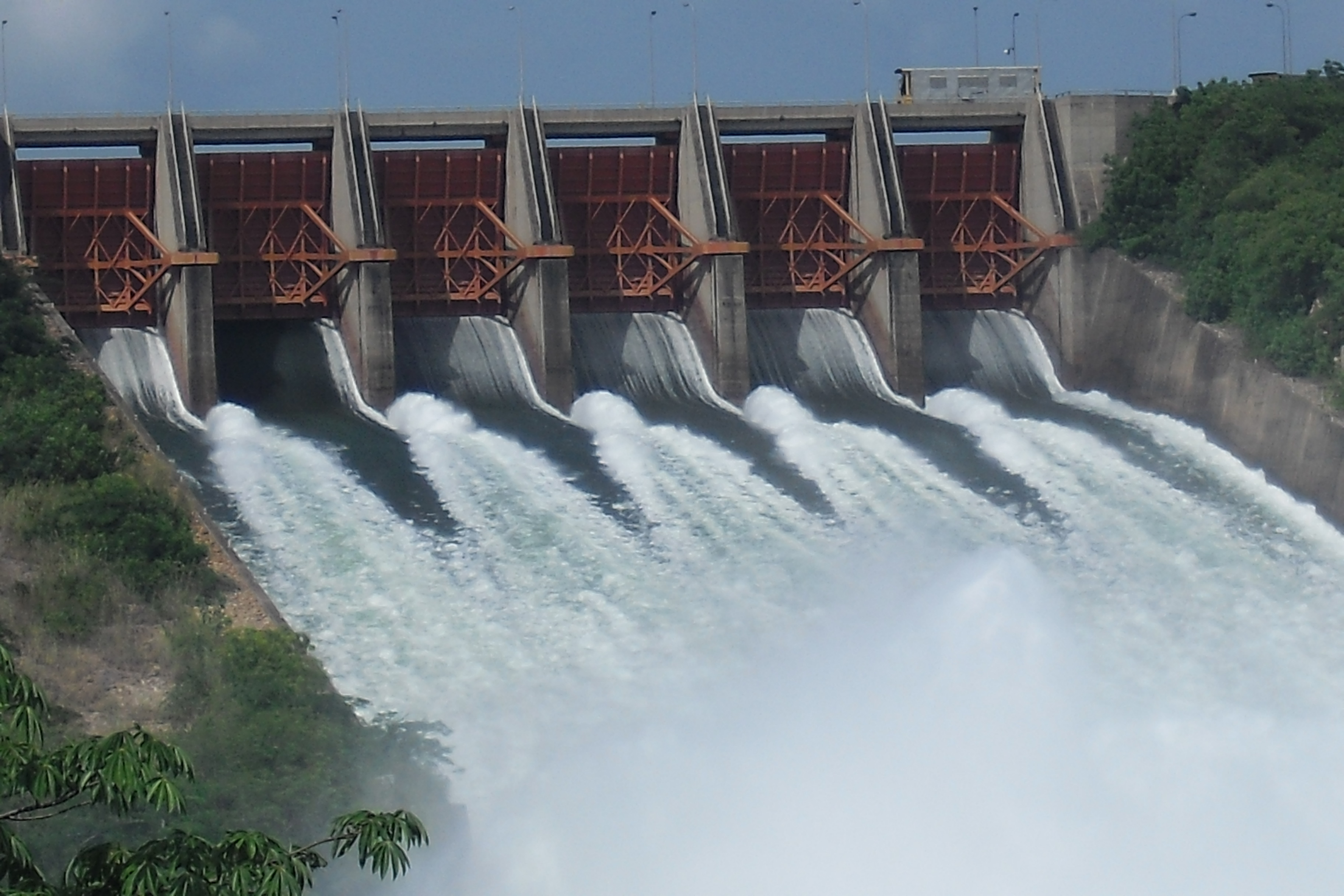

Data
- Electricity coverage (July 2012, 100%): 74% (total), 60% (rural)
- Installed capacity (2015): 3655.5 MW
- Share of fossil energy: 50.9%
- Share of renewable energy: 49.1% (hydro, bio-energy, thermal energy); 0.03% (solar, wind energy)
- GHG emissions from electricity generation (2013): 0.2 Mt CO_{2}
- Average electricity use (2010): 298 kWh per capita
- Distribution losses (2010): 3%
- Transmission losses (2011): 3%

Consumption by sector (% of total)
- Industrial: 37.5
- Commercial: 12.5
- Public sector: 50

Tariffs and financing
- Average residential tariff (US$/kW·h, 2011): 0.0016
- Annual investment in electricity (2013): 1 billion (40% public, 60% private)

Services
- Sector unbundling: Yes
- Share of private sector in generation: 53%
- Competitive supply to large users: Yes
- Competitive supply to residential users: No

Institutions
- No. of service providers: 38 (generation), 6 (transmission), 22 (distribution)
- Responsibility for regulation: GEC-Ghana Energy Commission Office
- Responsibility for policy-setting: GEC-Ghana Energy Commission Office
- Responsibility for the environment: National Environment Commission; Ghana Environmental Protection Agency (EPA)
- Electricity sector law: Yes (2007, modified in 2012)
- Renewable energy law: Yes
- CDM transactions related to the electricity sector: 1 registered CDM project

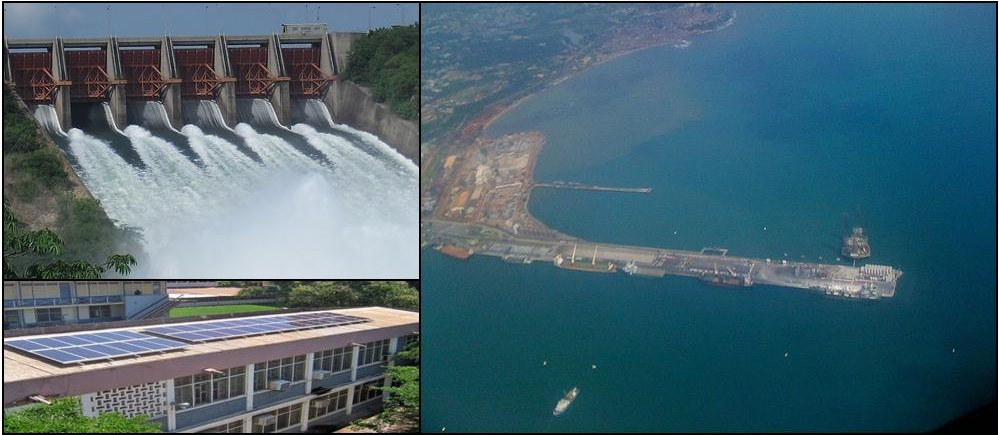
Hydropower and solar energy electricity generation industries, and oil and gas industry in Ghana

Ghana generates electric power from hydropower, fossil-fuel (thermal energy), and renewable energy sources such as wind and solar energy. Electricity generation is one of the key factors in order to achieve the development of the Ghanaian national economy, with aggressive and rapid industrialization; Ghana's national electric energy consumption was 265 kilowatt hours per person in 2009.

Ghana exports some of its generated energy and fossil fuels to other countries. Electricity transmission is under the operations of Ghana Grid Company. The distribution of electricity is under Northern Electricity Distribution Company and Electricity Company of Ghana.

According to data by the International Energy Agency, Ghana's electricity mix in 2021 relied on natural gas (62.6%) and hydropower (34.1%). Solar power accounted for less than one percent.

== History ==
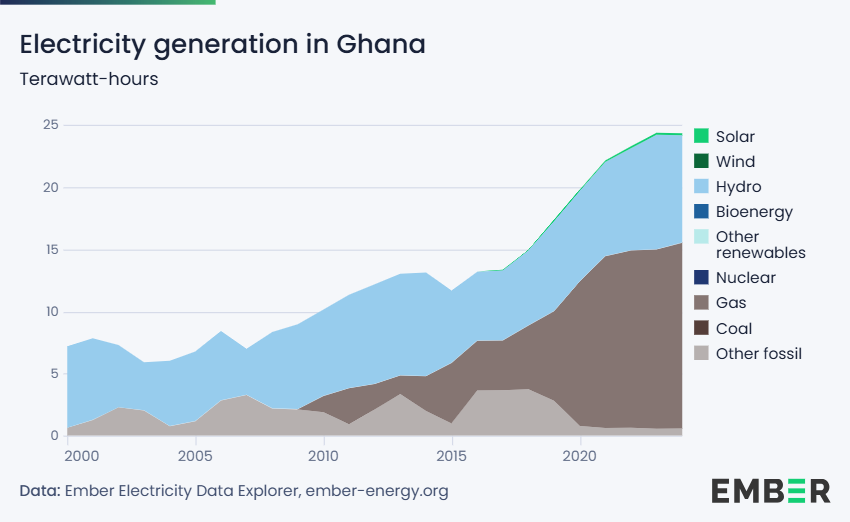
Electricity generation in Ghana in terawatt-hours

The first Ghana government-sponsored public electricity supply commenced in 1914, at Sekondi-Takoradi, operated by the Ghana Railway Administration (Ghana Railway Corporation). The power supply was extended to Sekondi-Takoradi in 1928. The Ghana Public Works Department had commenced a limited direct current (DC) supply in Accra in 1922. A large alternating current (AC) project started on 1 November 1924, and a small plant consisting of three horizontal single cylinder oil-powered engines was installed in Koforidua in 1925.

In 1926, work started on electrical distribution to Kumasi. A restricted evening supply commenced in May 1927, and a power station was brought into full operation on 1 October 1927. In the same year, DC supply was installed at Winneba, but this was subsequently changed to AC by extending an existing supply from Swedru. During 1929–30, a limited electricity supply was extended to Tamale, until a new AC plant was installed in 1938.

The next power station to be established was in Cape Coast in 1932. This was taken over by the Ghana Electricity Department in 1947. A Ghanaian power station at Swedru was commissioned in 1948, followed by the installation of generating plants at Akim Oda, Dunkwa-on-Offin and Bolgatanga in 1948. On 27 May 1949, an electricity supply was made available at Nsawam, through the building of an 11 kV overhead transmission line from Accra. The Keta electricity supply which was included in the program was delayed by staff difficulties and was not commissioned until 1955.

The Tema power station was commissioned in 1956 with a 3 x 650 kilowatts (870 hp) diesel generating set. The Ho power station followed in 1957 and from 1961 to 1964. The Tema power station was extended to a maximum capacity of 35,298 kilowatts (47,335 hp), making it probably the biggest single diesel-powered generating station in Africa.

In 1963 the Ghana Electricity Division brought into operation the first 161 kV transmission system in Ghana, which was used to carry power from the Tema Power Station. At its peak in 1965, about 75 percent of the power was used in Accra.

In 1994, Ghana's total generating capacity was about 1.187GW, and annual production totaled approximately 4.49GW. The main source of supply was the Volta River Authority with six 127MW turbines installed at the Akosombo Hydroelectric Project. At this time, this project provided the bulk of all electricity consumed in Ghana, some 60 percent of which was purchased by Volta Aluminum Company (VALCO) for its smelter. The power plant export amounted to an estimated equivalent of 180,000 tons of oil in 1991.

The balance of Ghana's electricity was produced by diesel units owned by the Electricity Corporation of Ghana, by mining companies, and by a 160MW hydroelectric plant at Kpong, about 40 kilometers downstream from Akosombo. A third dam at Bui on the Black Volta River had been studied, and was completed in 2013.

Other sites with the potential for power generation, on the Pra River, Tano River, White Volta River, and Ankobra River, would also require substantial investment.

Ghana has attempted to increase distribution of its electricity throughout the country. One program Ghana has initiated will provide reliable and widespread electricity in the urban and southern parts of the country. In addition, the extension of the national grid to the Northern Region was commissioned in 1989. The extension links northern Ghana to the power generated from the Akosombo Dam.

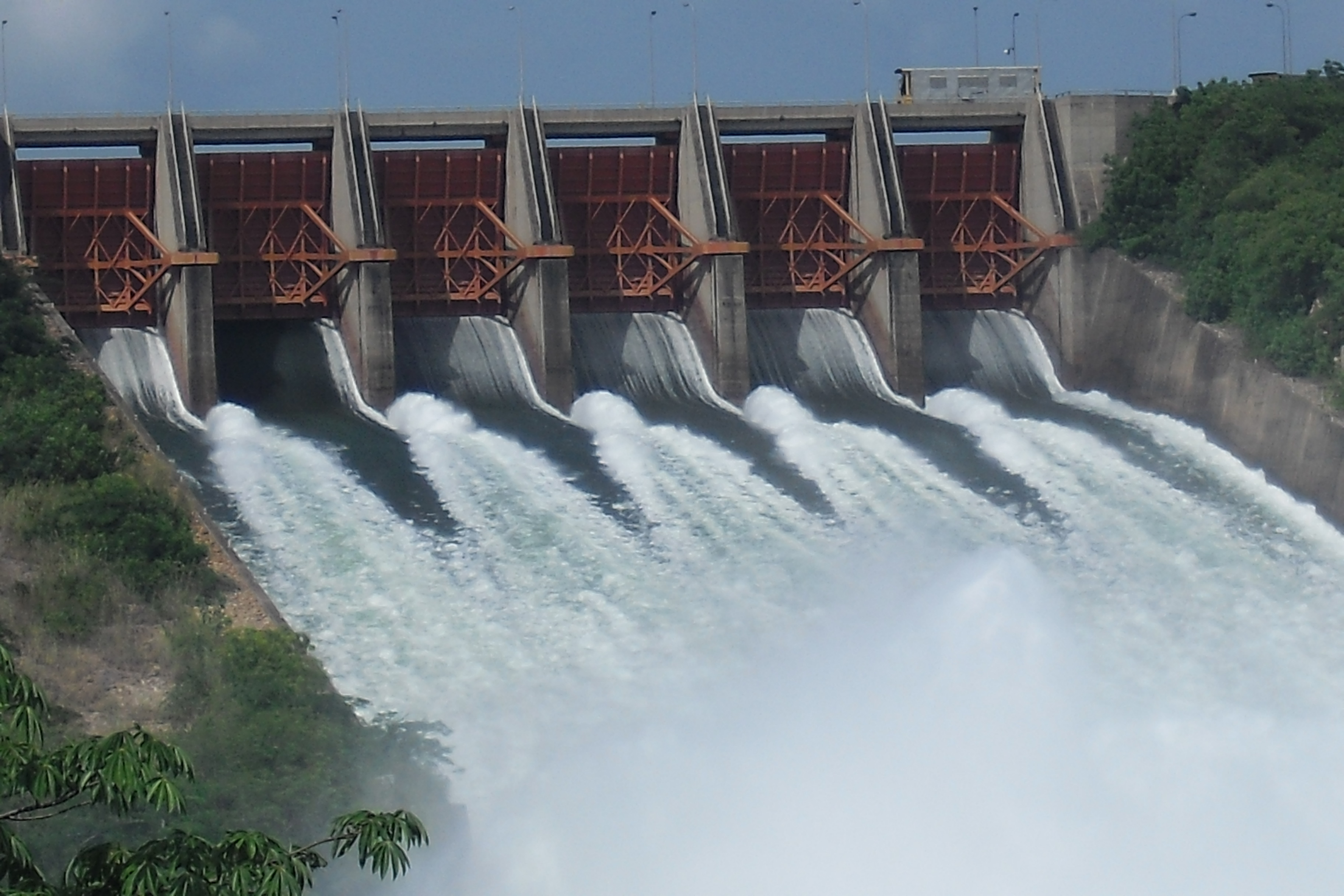
The Akosombo Dam was built on the Volta river in 1965 and is spilling water through six floodgates because of the all-time high water level at the Akosombo Dam.

The second phase of the extension will connect major towns in Upper East Region with the regional capital Bolgatanga, at a cost of US$100 million. The final phase will see exports of electricity across the northern national border of Ghana to Burkina-Faso. In early 1991 the Electricity Corporation of Ghana began the expansion of electricity networks in the northwestern areas of Accra, and the Ghanaian corporation aimed to extend the supply of electricity to all isolated centers in Ghana, where diesel is the main source of power. Plans were also begun to increase the supply of electricity by utilization of thermal energy. Construction was anticipated by late 1994 on the country's first thermal power generating plant near Sekondi-Takoradi and scheduled for completion in 1997. The plant contributed 300MW of electricity to the Ghana national grid.

Since 2007, Ghana has become an electricity exporter, and since 2011 an exporter of crude oil and natural gas, and a generator of electricity by thermal energy, hydropower, solar energy and renewable energies since 2012.

== Fossil fuel ==
=== Crude oil and natural gas production ===
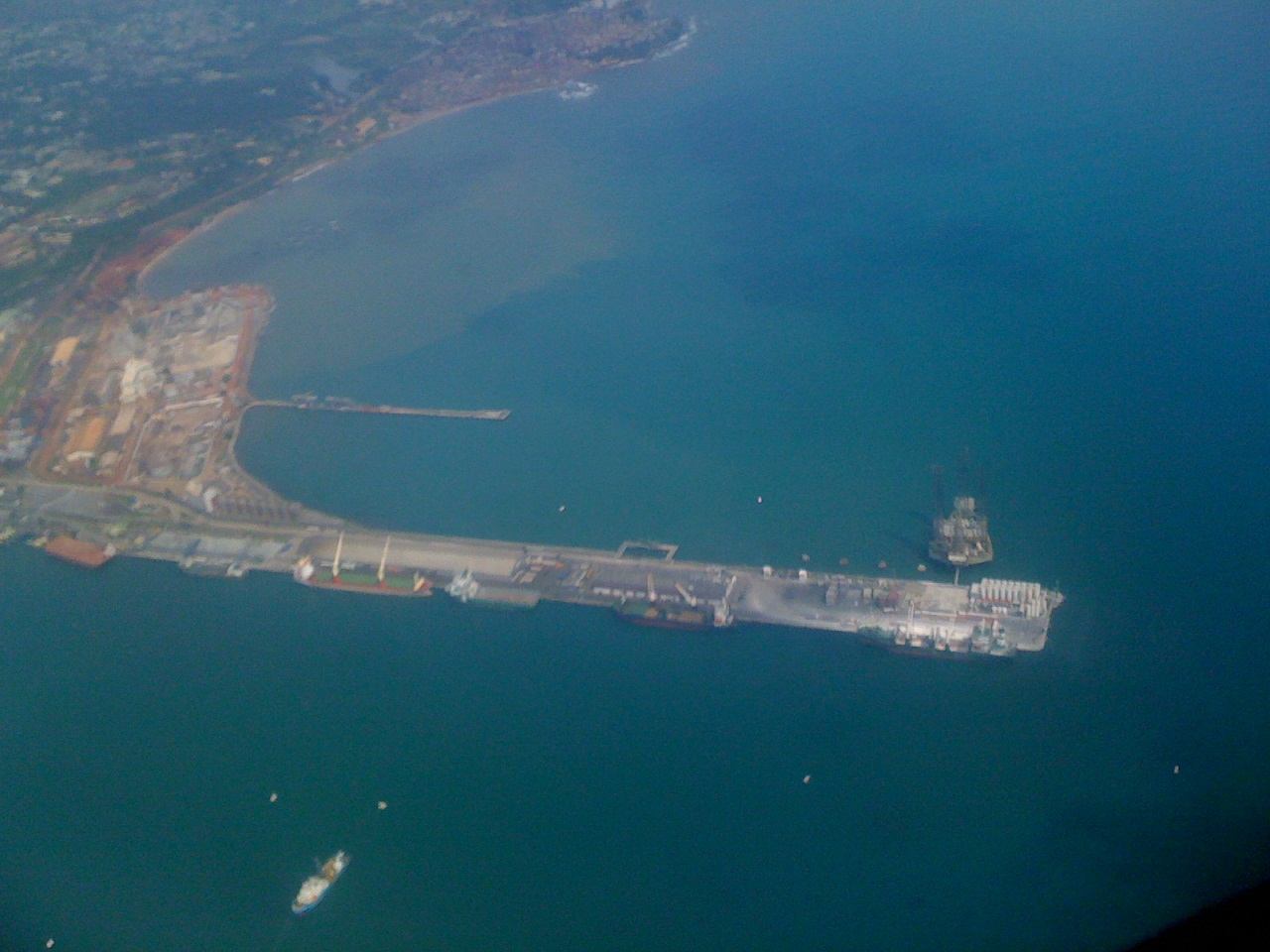
Oil platform off the Sekondi-Takoradi Coast Western Region of Ghana

Ghana produces 140–200 million cubic feet of natural gas per day. Natural gas production in Ghana has been restrained from full production capacity since December 2012, due to delays in construction of a gas refinery in Sekondi-Takoradi that was scheduled to be completed by December 2012, then scheduled to be completed by December 2013, and due to which in turn has led to gas flaring and Ghana losing hundreds of millions a day in revenues from natural gas production. Since December 2012, billions of dollars a year have been lost from the Ghanaian GDP, due to the delays in construction of this gas refinery.

A Ghanaian oilfield which is reported to contain up to 3 billion barrels (480,000,000 m^{3}) of crude oil was discovered in 2007, and according to the Ghanaian government, the country could expand its petroleum reserves up to 5 billion barrels (790,000,000 m^{3}) of crude oil in reserves within a few years.

Ghana produces 200,000 barrels of crude oil per day on average, from an expected 1–2 million barrels of crude oil per day, and an expected crude oil production revenue of US$ 30 billion a year; Angola, also a crude oil producer, has an expected 2 million barrels of crude oil production per day, and receives an expected $33.7 billion a year in crude oil revenues.

Tremendous inflow of economic capital from fossil fuel into the Ghanaian economy, began from the first quarter of 2011 when Ghana started producing crude oil and natural gas in commercial quantities and the Ghana crude oil industry accounted for 6% of the Ghanaian economic revenue for 2011. Oil and gas exploration in Ghana continues, and the amount of both crude oil and natural gas in Ghana continues to increase. As of August 2022, the crude oil production size in Ghana was 177 thousand barrels per day.

== Increasing energy supply and consumption ==
Among Ghana's energy consumers, including industries and residents, energy supply is crucial for constant and efficient consumption. In 2020, the country supplied more than 12 million metric tons of oil equivalent of energy, which was an all-time high compared to the five preceding years. Specifically, in 2020, the total energy supply from natural gas and hydro sources reached approximately three million metric tons of oil equivalent and 627,000 metric tons of oil equivalent, respectively. In terms of consumption, the total amount of primary energy consumed amounted to 100 terawatt hours as of 2019, translating to about 3,180 kilowatt hours per capita. Ghana's final energy consumption, which refers to what is consumed by end users, reached around 8.6 million tons of oil equivalent in 2020. Petroleum and biomass were the most consumed energy products.

As part of the expanding consumption of energy by consumers, the Electricity Company of Ghana (ECG) has entered into a partnership with the Ghana Grid Company (GRIDCo) to enhance the region's electricity supply capacity in response to escalating demand. This collaboration, finalized during a meeting at GRIDCo's headquarters in Anwomaso, Ashanti Region, involves the installation of a 145MVA power transformer at strategic points between GRIDCo and ECG Bulk Supply Points. This initiative replaces one of the existing 50MVA transformers, significantly increasing the installed capacity to effectively manage rising load demands, especially during peak hours (7 pm–11 pm).

== Solar energy ==
The biggest photovoltaic (PV) and the largest solar energy plant in Africa, the Nzema Solar Power Station, based in Nzema District, Ghana, will be able to provide electricity to more than 100,000 homes. The 155MW plant will increase Ghana's electricity generating capacity by 6%.

Construction work on the GH¢ 740 million (£ 248 million) and the 4th largest solar power plant in the world is being developed by Blue Energy, a UK-based renewable energy investment company, majority owned and funded by members of the Stadium Group, a large European private asset and development company with £ 2.5 billion under management. The project director is Douglas Coleman, from Mere Power Nzema Ltd, Ghana.

Unlike many other solar projects in Africa that use concentrated solar power, solar plants will use photovoltaic (PV) technology to convert sunlight directly into electricity. Installation of more than 630,000 solar PV modules will begin by the end of 2017.

As of August 2015, the project was still under development. In February 2023, the president cut the sod for construction of a 17MW solar power project in Lawra-Kaleo.

== Wind energy ==
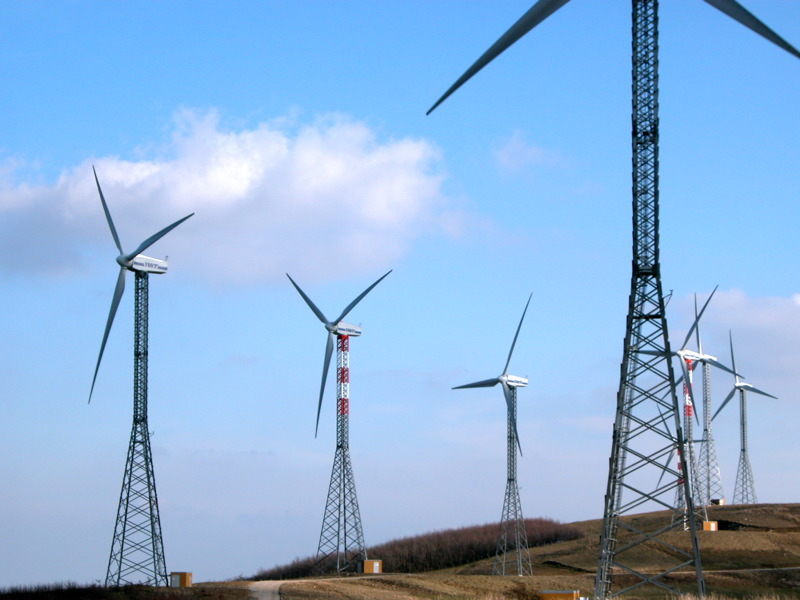
Wind turbines at wind farm

In addition to hydropower and solar energy, Ghana also produces a large amount of other renewable energy, including wind power, geothermal and biomass. It is the Ghana energy industry's goal to have 10% of the country's energy mix come from renewable sources (not counting large-scale hydropower) by 2015, or at the very latest by 2020.

Ghana has Class 4–6 wind resources in high wind areas, such as Nkwanta, the Accra Plains, Kwahu and Gambaga mountains. The maximum energy that could be tapped from Ghana's available wind resource for electricity is estimated at 500–600 GWh/year. In 2011, from the same Energy Commission, the largest Akosombo hydroelectric dam in Ghana alone, produced 6,495 GWh of electric power. Counting all Ghana's geothermal energy production, the total energy generated was 11,200 GWh in the same year.

These assessments do not take into consideration further limiting factors such as land-use restrictions, the existing grid (or how far the wind resource may be from the grid) and accessibility. Wind energy has the potential to contribute significantly to the country's energy industry; 10% can certainly be attained in terms of installed capacity and about 5% of total electric generation potential from wind alone.

== Bio-energy ==
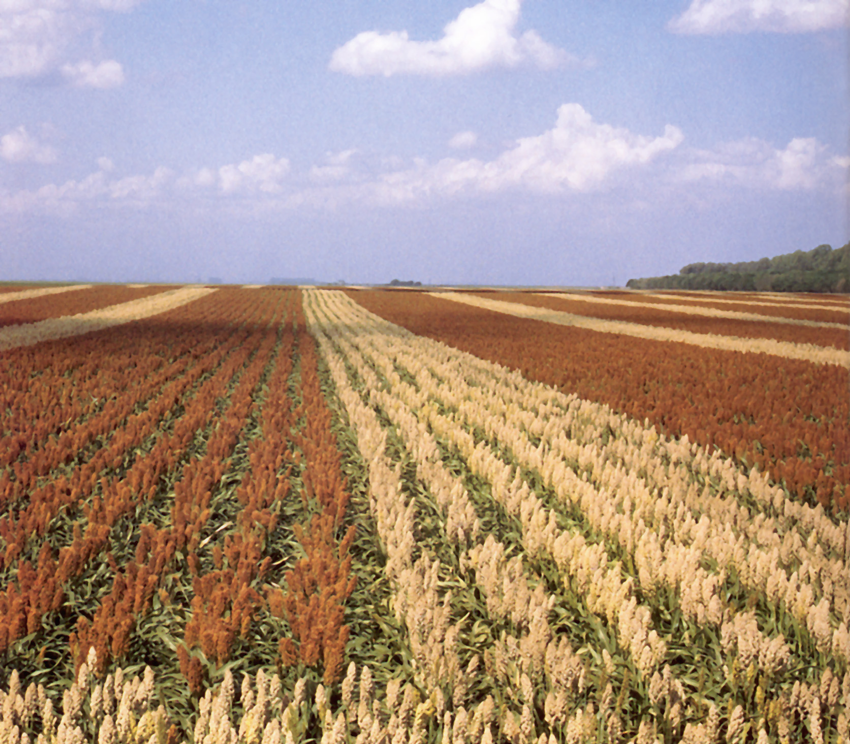
A hybrid sorghum plantation field

Ghana has put in place mechanisms to attract investments into its biomass and bio-energy sectors to stimulate rural development, create jobs and provide foreign exchange.

The vast arable and degraded land mass of Ghana has the potential for the cultivation of crops and plants that could be converted into a wide range of solid and liquid bio-fuels, as the development of alternative transportation fuels could help Ghana to diversify and secure its future energy supplies. Main investments in the bio-energy areas existed in the areas of production are transportation, storage, distribution, sale, marketing and exportation.

The goal of Ghana regarding bio-energy, as articulated its energy sector policy, is to modernize and examine the benefits of bio-energy on a sustainable basis. Biomass is Ghana's dominant energy resource in terms of endowment and consumption, with the two primary bio-fuels consumed being ethanol and biodiesel. Highlights of the key policy objectives strategy for the renewable energy areas include sustaining the supply and efficient use of wood fuels, while ensuring that their utilization does not lead to deforestation.

The plan would support private sector investments in the cultivation of bio-fuel raw materials, extraction of bio-oil and its refining into secondary products, thereby creating appropriate financial and tax incentives. The Ghana Renewal Energy Act provides the necessary fiscal incentives for renewable energy development by the private sector, and also details the control and management of bio-fuel and wood-fuel projects in Ghana. The Ghana National Petroleum Authority (NPA) was tasked by the Renewable Energy Act 2011 to price Ghana's bio-fuel blend in accordance with the prescribed petroleum pricing formula.

The combined effects of climate change and global economic turbulence have triggered a sense of urgency among Ghanaian policymakers, industry and development practitioners to find sustainable and viable solutions in the area of bio-fuels.

== See also ==
- Economy of Ghana
- Energy law
- Nuclear power in Ghana
- Dumsor, local term for electricity black-outs
