= Volta River Authority =

Main generator and supplier of electricity in Ghana

- Formation: 26 April 1961
- Type: Energy generator and supplier
- Headquarters: Accra, Ghana
- Official language: English
- Chief Executive: Ing. Edward Ekow Obeng-Kenzo
- Website: https://www.vra.com/

The Volta River Authority (VRA) is the main generator and supplier of electricity in Ghana. They are also responsible for the maintenance of the hydro power supply plant.

== Establishment ==
The VRA was established by the Volta River Development Act, Act 46 of the Republic of Ghana on 26 April 1961.

The main purpose of the VRA is to generate and supply electricity for Ghana's needs. It is also responsible for managing the environmental impact of the creation of the Volta Lake on the towns and people bordering the lake. The VRA maintains a national energy supply grid and although it started with hydroelectric power, it is now branching into other types of energy such as thermal energy. The company represents Ghana in the West African Power Pool.

== Power generation ==
- Akosombo Hydroelectric Project
- Kpong Dam
- Takoradi Power Station
- Navrongo Solar Power Plant
- Tema Power Station
- Kpone Power Station

== Other projects ==
- Schools
- Health services
- Environmental and Resettlement activities

== Subsidiary companies ==
- Volta Hotel
- Volta Lake Transport Company (VLTC)
- Kpong Farms
- Northern Electricity Distribution Company (NEDCo)
- VRA Property Holding Company (VRA PROPCo)
- VRA Health Services Limited
- VRA Schools

== See also ==
- Electricity sector in Ghana
- Ministry of Energy (Ghana)
- Osagyefo Barge
