= Jirapa/Lambussie District =

Former District in Upper West region, Ghana

- Former District
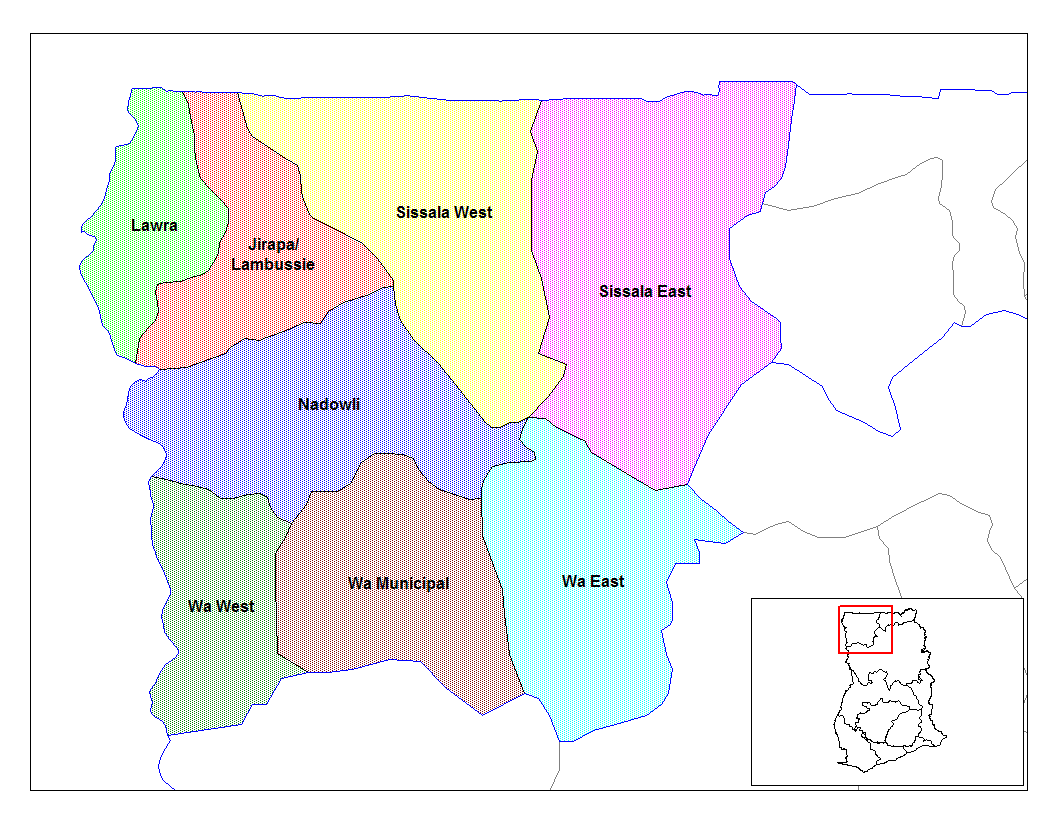
- Districts of Upper West Region

- Location of Jirapa/Lambussie District within Upper West
- Coordinates: 10°31′25.68″N 2°42′12.24″W
- Country: Ghana
- Region: Upper West
- Capital: Jirapa

Government
  - District Executive: Justine Bayelah Dakurah

Area
  - Total: 2,125 km^{2} (820 sq mi)

Population (2013)
  - Total: —
- Time zone: UTC+0 (GMT)
- ISO 3166 code: GH-UW-JL

Jirapa/Lambussie District is a former district that was located in Upper West Region, Ghana. Originally created as an ordinary district assembly in 1988. However on 29 February 2008, it was split off into two new districts: Jirapa Municipal District (which it was elevated to municipal district assembly status on 15 March 2018; capital: Jirapa) and Lambussie-Karni District (capital: Lambussie). The district assembly was located in the northwest part of Upper West Region and had Jirapa as its capital town.

== Geography ==
Jirapa/Lambussie District lies in the northwestern corner of the Upper West Region of Ghana. It shares boundaries to the south with Nadowli District, to the east with Sissala East District, and to the west with Lawra District.

== Economy ==
About eighty percent of the population are engaged in agriculture and other related activities. The major crops are millet, maize, cotton and groundnuts. Livestock farming is practiced throughout the district.

== Education ==
Within the Jirapa/Lambussie District there are several schools for both boys and girls. St. Francis Girls' Secondary School Jirapa is the only girls' secondary school in the district.

== Demographics and population ==
=== Demographics ===
About five percent of the people live in major towns of the District while a significant ninety-five percent live in rural settlements. The District is therefore considered as a rural district.

== Sources ==
- "Districts of Ghana". Statoids.
- GhanaDistricts.com
