= Gbele Resource Centre =

Protected area in Ghana

- Gbele Game Production Reserve
- Location within Ghana
- Location: Upper West Region, Ghana
- Nearest town: Tumu
- Coordinates: 10°31′21″N 02°13′08″W
- Area: 565 km^{2} (218 sq mi)
- Operator: Forestry Commission (Wildlife Division)

The Gbele Resource Centre or Gbele Game Production Reserve is one of the lesser known game reserves in Ghana. The reserve is the fourth largest in Ghana.

== History ==
About 30 km to the north of the centre is the Gwollu Defence Wall.

=== Resettlement ===
In 2019, the government finalised an agreement with settlers in the park which will ensure that they had all vacated the reserve by March 2020 and moved to new housing units it had built for them. The resettlement programme began in 2011. The settlers had migrated into the reserve in search of fertile land for farming.

== Geography ==
The Gbele Resource Centre is located to the north-east of Wa, capital of the Upper West Region. To the west is Nadowli, Jirapa and Lawra. To the north is Nandom and Hamile. There is a village called Gbele located within the reserve. It is located in the Sissala West, Sissala East Municipal and Daffiama Bussie Issa districts. The nearest town is Tumu, capital of the Sissala East Municipal District which is 17 km to the north.

== Environment ==
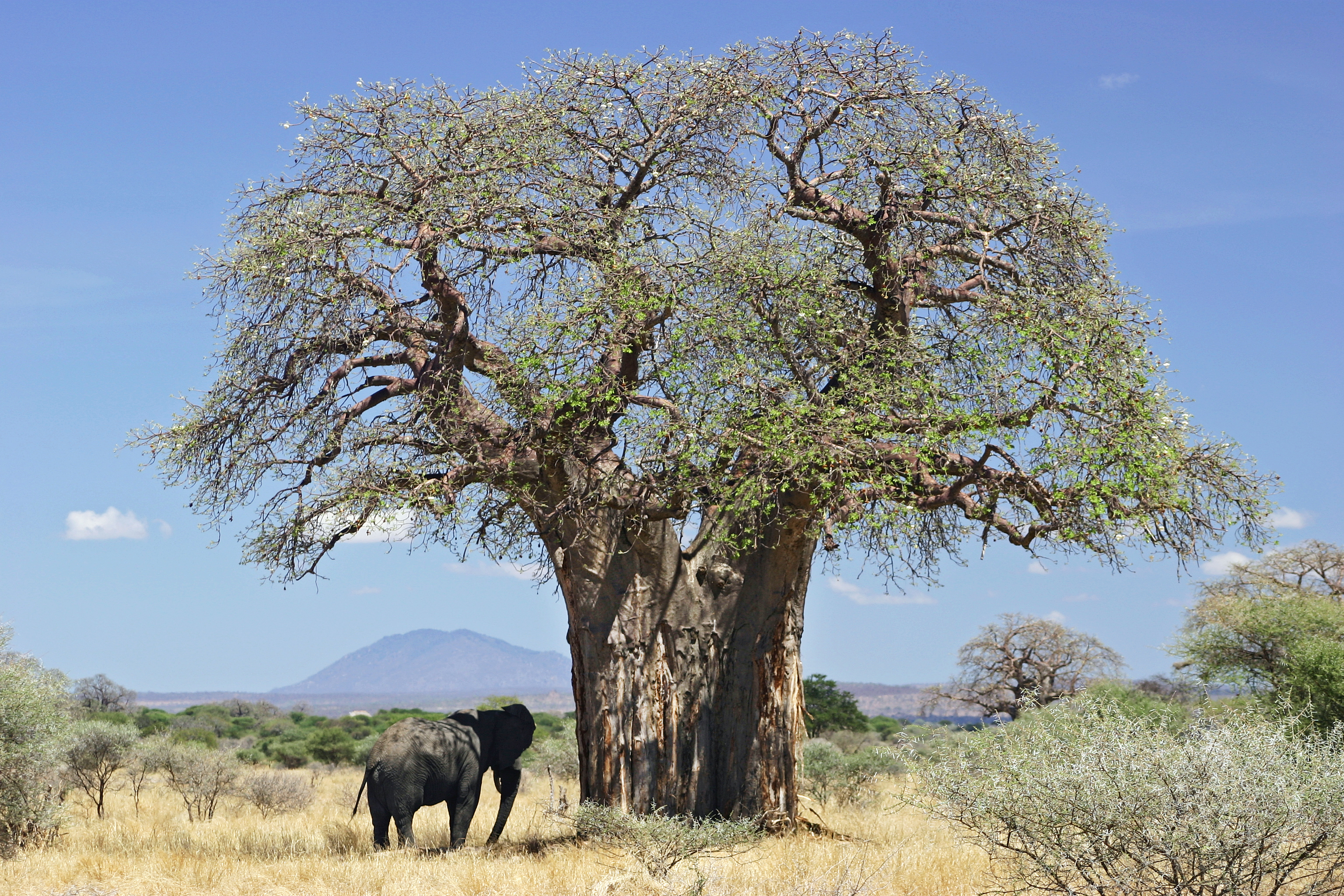
African baobab (Adansonia digitata)

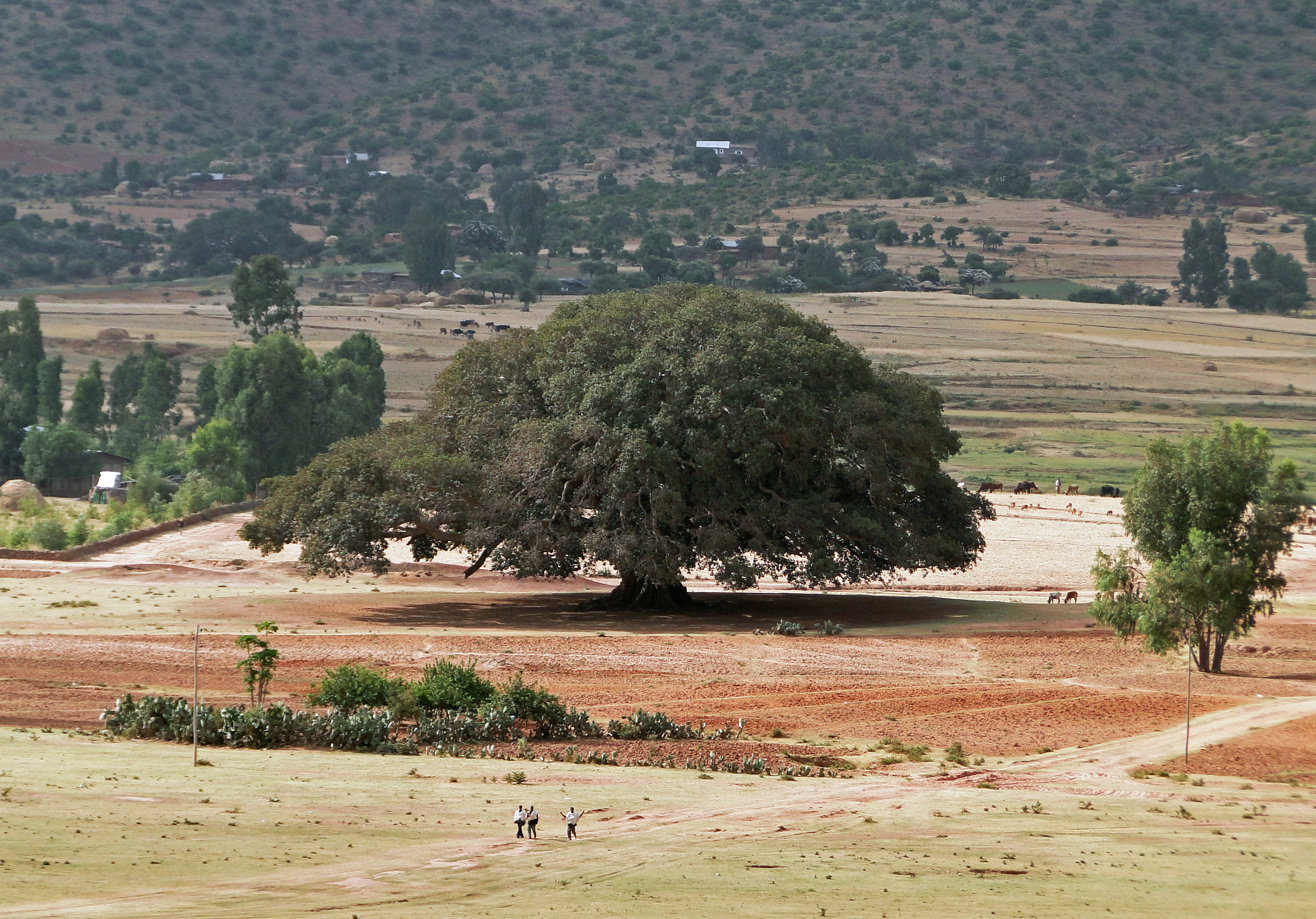
Sycamore fig (Ficus sycomorus)

The topgraphy of the reserve is generally flat. The Kulpawn River which is seasonal flows from the west to the southeast. Around Gbele village are thickets of Adansonia digitata, Faidherbia and Ficus sycomorus.

=== Wildlife ===
==== Birds ====
A total of 176 species of birds have been recorded in the reserve.

The staff in the reserve are aware of an additional 18 species.[6] Gbele Resource Centre is the only wildlife reserve where the Rufous-rumped lark is known to occur and breed. It is also one of only three reserves where the Yellow-billed oxpecker is recorded. Other bird species include black-headed weaver, Dorst's cisticola, Gambaga flycatcher, northern carmine bee-eater, red-throated bee-eater, spotted thick-knee, violet turaco and Willcocks's honeyguide.[7] The reserve has been designated an Important Bird Area (IBA) by BirdLife International because it supports significant populations of many bird species.[8]

==== Mammals ====
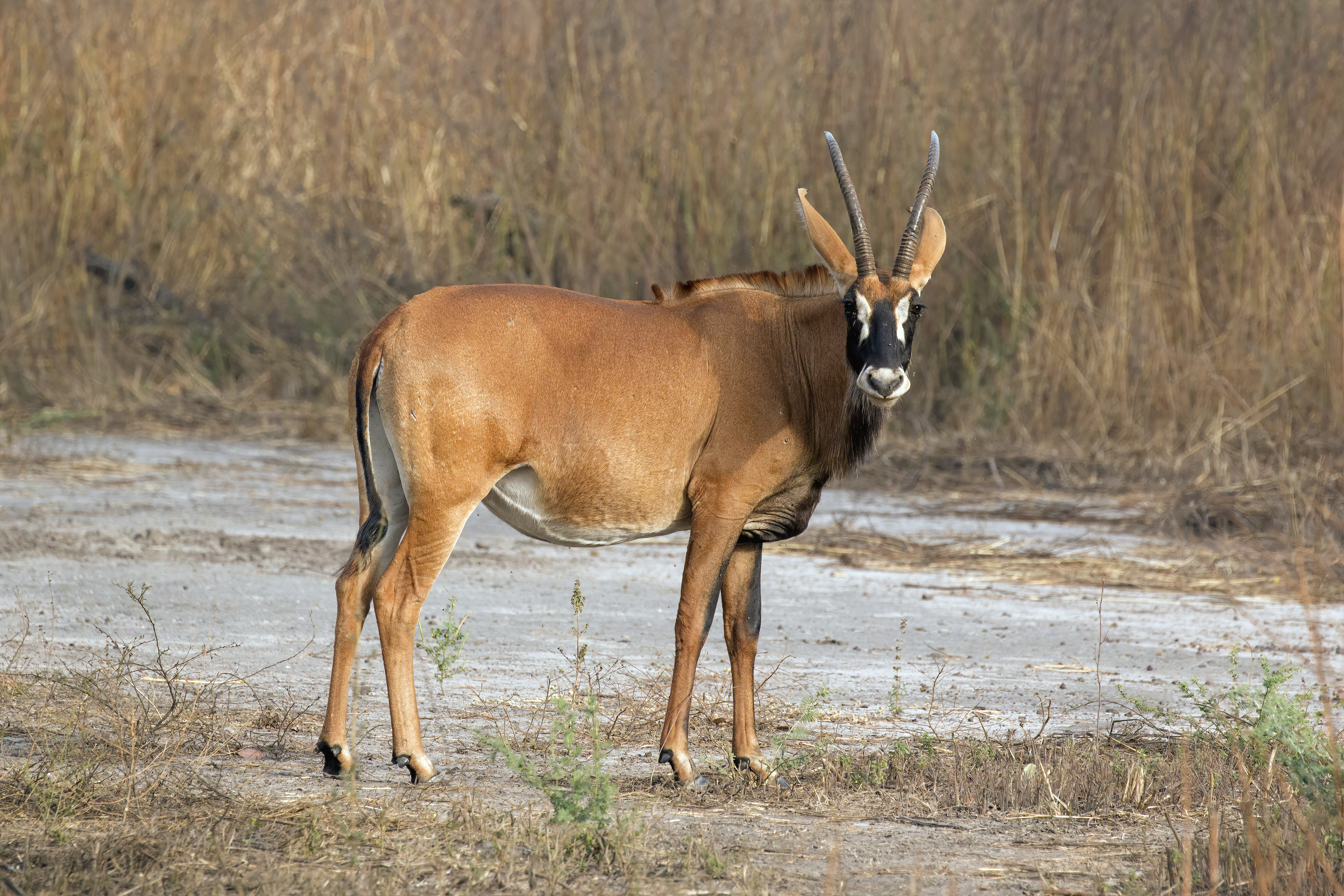
Roan antelope

Mammal species present include hartebeest, Cape bushbuck, waterbuck, common duiker, warthog, olive baboon, patas monkey, green monkey, African buffalo, African elephant and roan antelope.

== Gallery ==
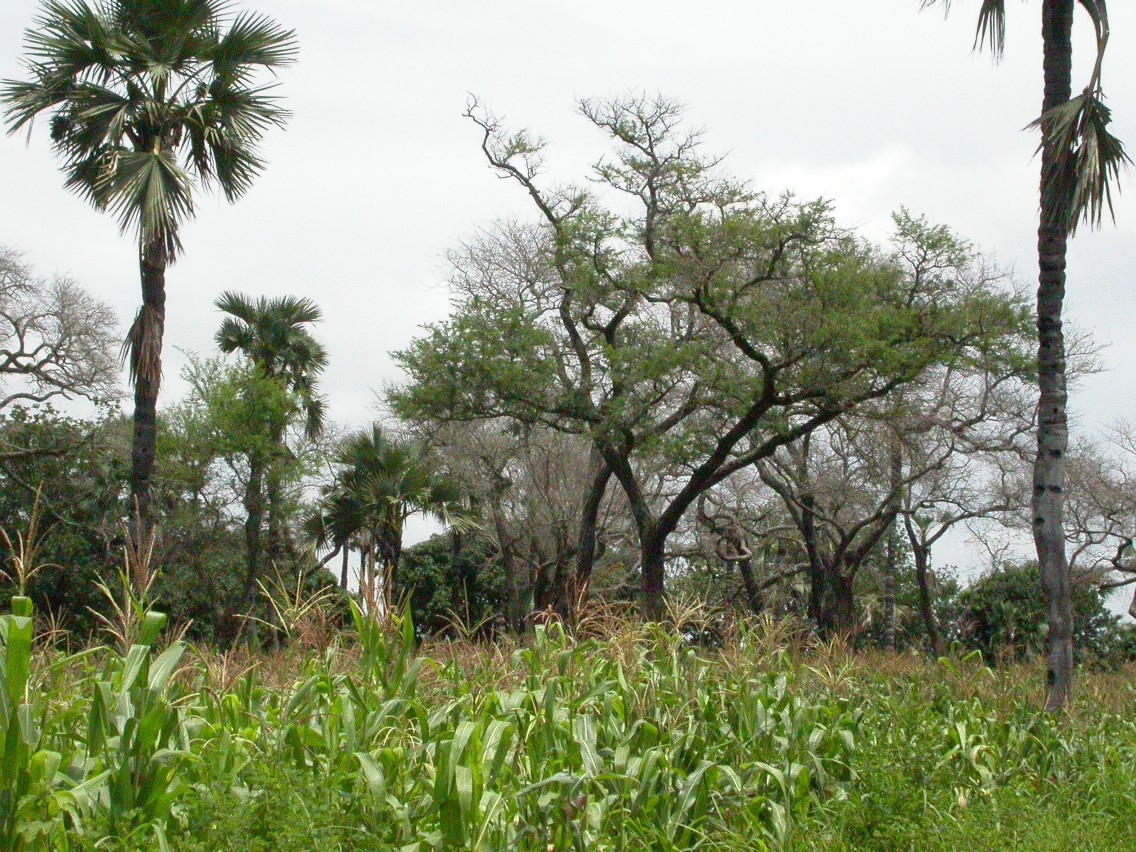
Faidherbia albida

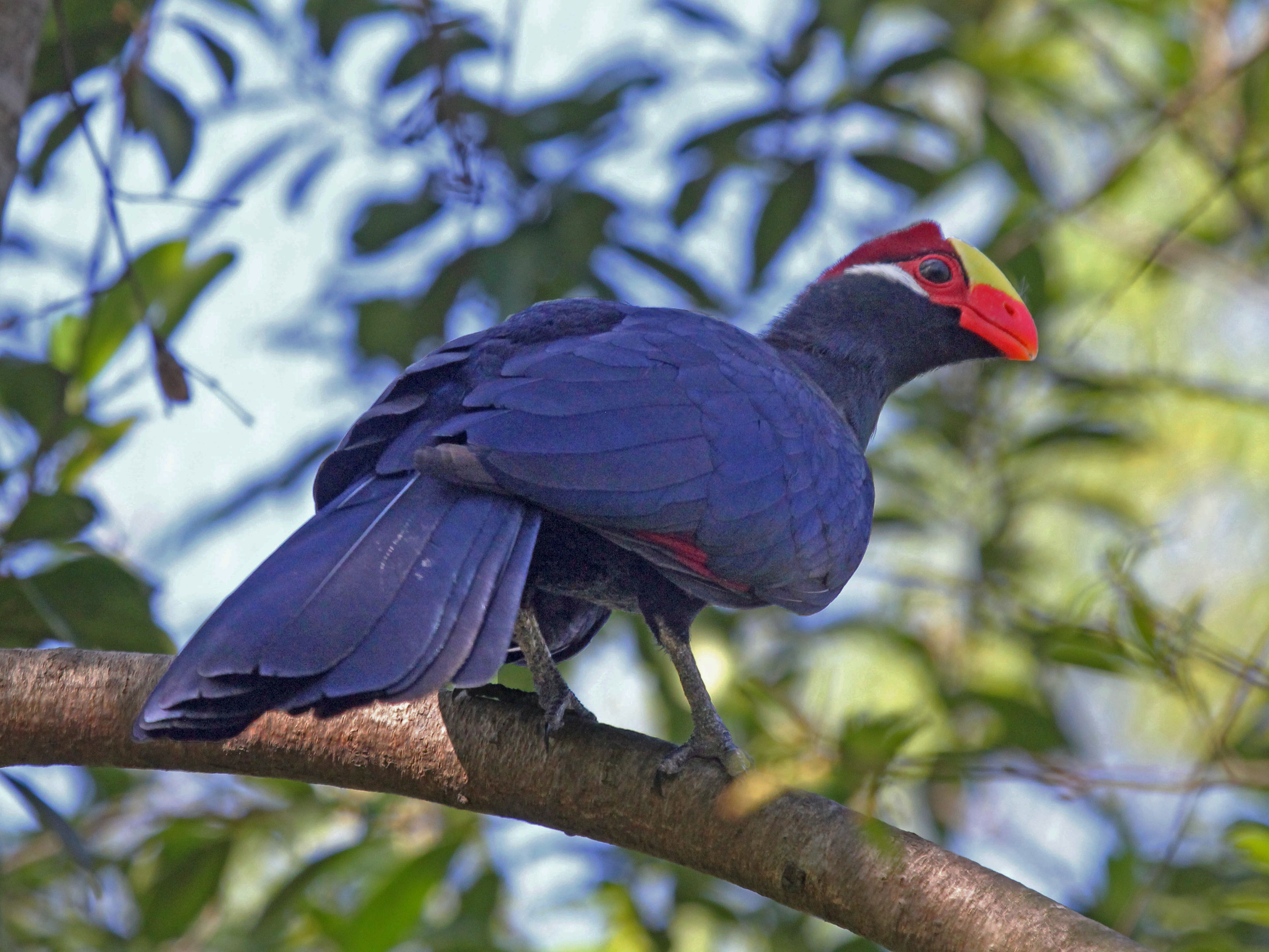
Violet turaco

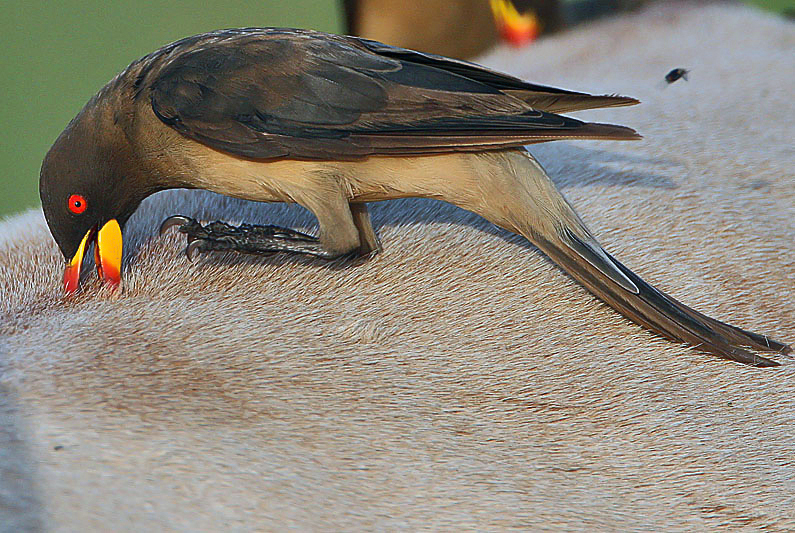
Yellow-billed Oxpecker

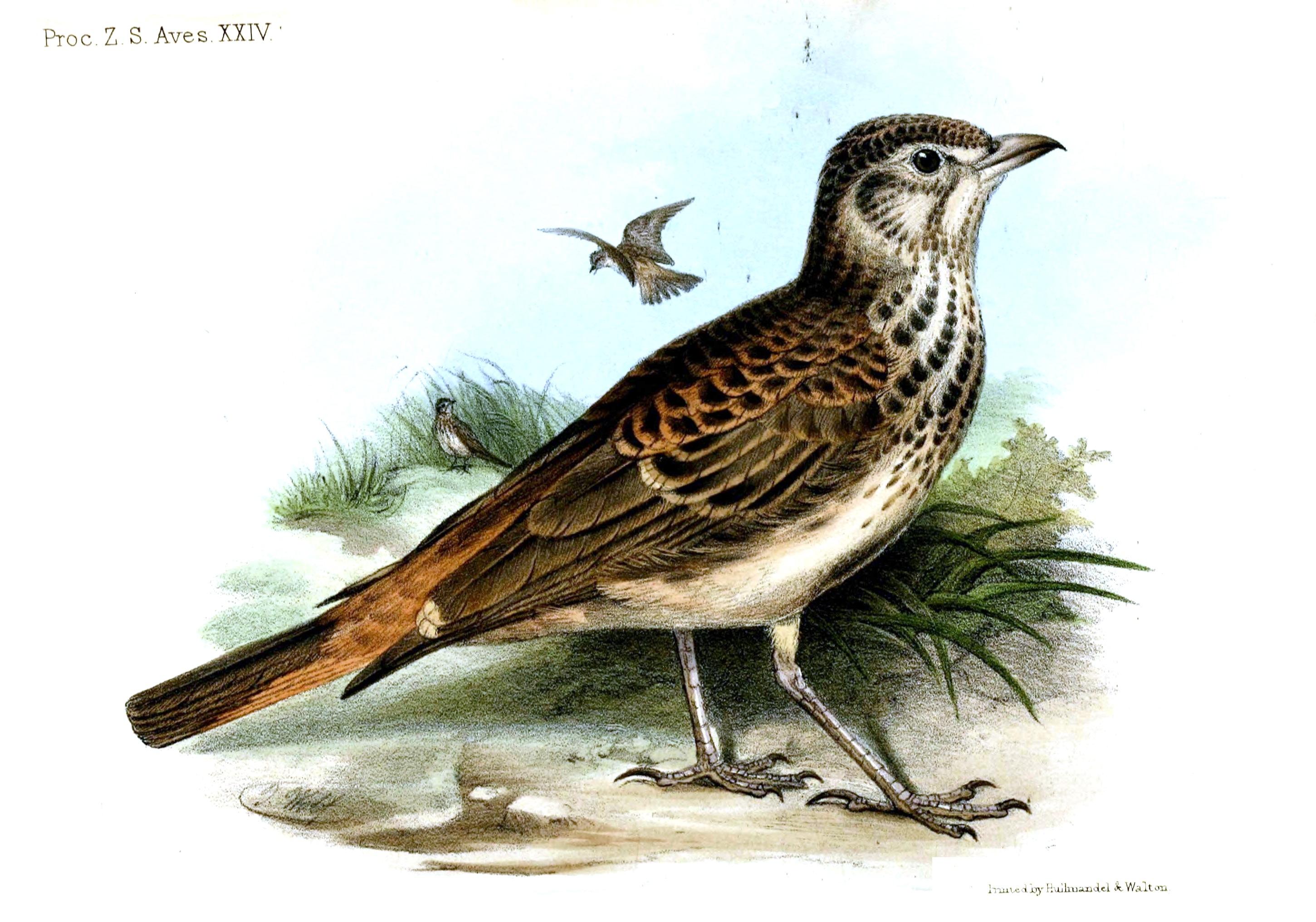
Rufous-rumped lark

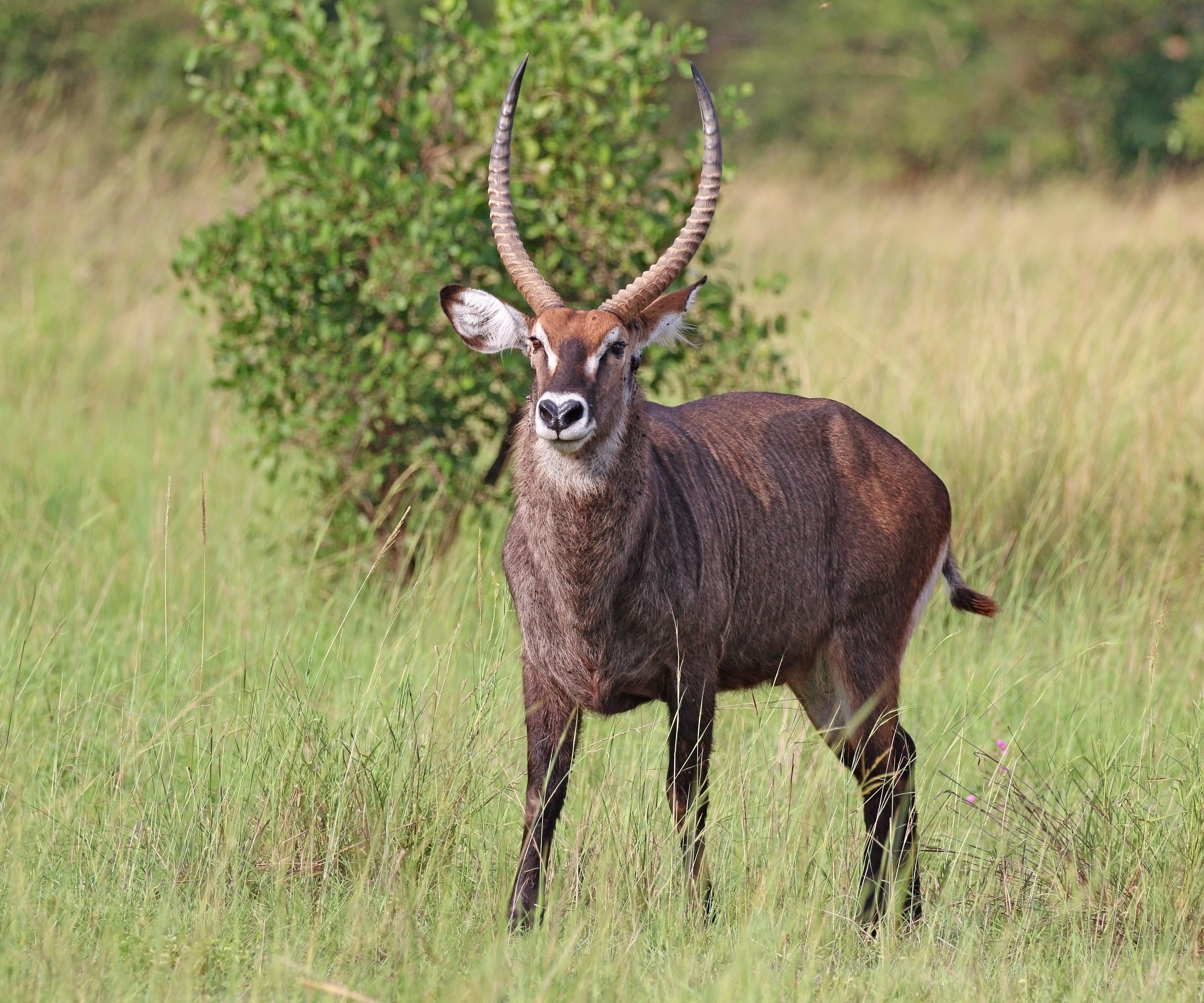
Waterbuck

== See also ==
- Tamale Airport
- Wa Airport
- Gwollu Defence Wall
