= Lawra/Nandom District =

- Former District
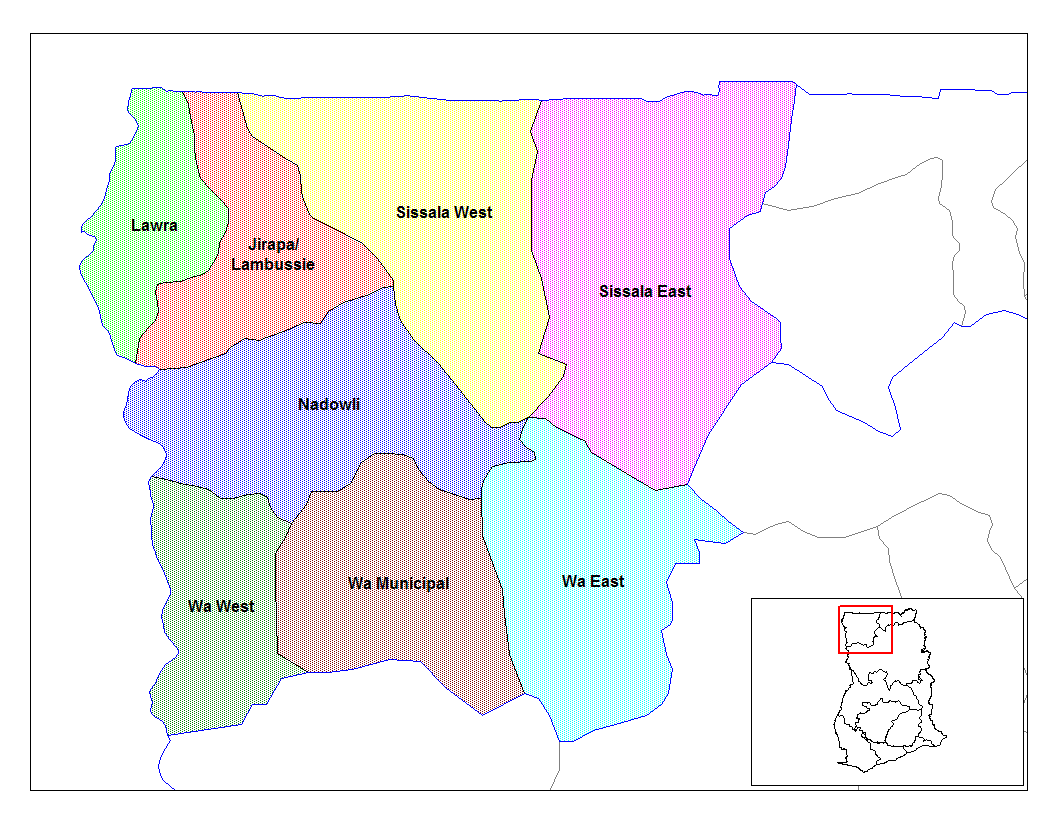
- Districts of Upper West Region

- Location of Lawra/Nandom District within Upper West
- Coordinates: 10°38′45.24″N 2°52′57.72″W
- Country: Ghana
- Region: Upper West
- Capital: Lawra

Government
  - District Executive: George Yasaame Sulley

Population (2013)
  - Total: —
- Time zone: UTC+0 (GMT)
- ISO 3166 code: GH-UW-LA

Lawra/Nandom District is a former district that was located in Upper West Region, Ghana. Originally created as an ordinary district assembly in 1988. However on 28 June 2012, it was split off into two new districts: Lawra District (which it was elevated to municipal district assembly status on 15 March 2018; capital: Lawra) and Nandom District (which it was elevated to municipal district assembly status on 27 January 2020; capital: Nandom). The district assembly was located in the northwest part of Upper West Region and had Lawra as its capital town.

== Sources ==
- "Districts of Ghana". Statoids.
- GhanaDistricts.com
