= Wiyaala =

Ghanaian singer-songwriter

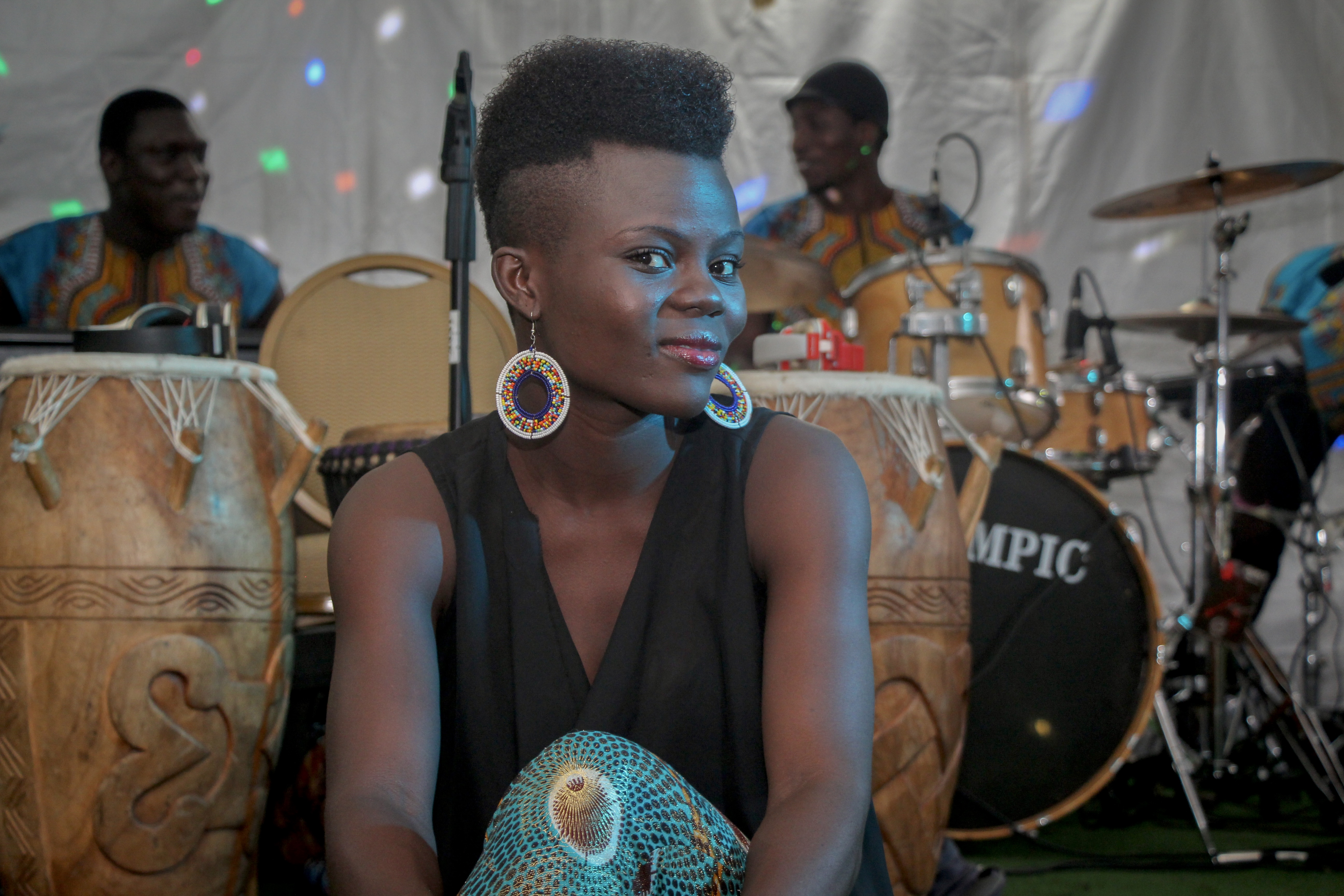
- Wiyaala in 2014

Background information
- Also known as: Wiyaala
- Born: Noella Wiyaala; 22 December 1986 (age 39); Wa, Upper West Ghana, Ghana
- Origin: Tema, Ghana
- Genres: Dance, pop, Afro pop
- Occupations: Singer-songwriter, designer, actress, model, athlete
- Instruments: vocals, guitar
- Years active: 2011–present
- Labels: Djimba World Records, JTV Digital
- Formerly of: Black N Peach
- Website: wiyaala.com

Noella Wiyaala Nwadei (known under the stage name Wiyaala; born on 22 December 1986) is a Ghanaian Afro-pop singer-songwriter who sings in her native language Sissala and Waala dialects and English, often combining all three languages within her songs. Wiyaala means "the doer" in the Sissala dialect. She achieved fame with her single "Make Me Dance" and her androgynous image. After making her name in reality shows in Accra, she established a solo career in 2013 with the hit single "Rock My Body",(Dance move was initiated by Van Calebs) which won her two awards at the 2014 first edition of the All Africa Music Awards, the Most Promising Artiste in Africa and Revelation of The African Continent. Wiyaala is also associated with UNICEF Ghana and the Ministry of Gender, Children and Social Protection's campaigns against child marriage, child poverty, health and sanitation. She headlined the 15th London African Music Festival in London. In March 2021, she was among the Top 30 Most Influential Women in Music by the 3Music Awards Women's Brunch.

== Life and career ==
=== Early life ===
Noella Wiyaala was born in Wa, Upper West Ghana as one of four sisters and grew up in Funsi and Tumu. She got first singing lessons from her mother, a choir singer in the local church, and she has performed ever since she was 5 years old. Her surname, which she picked for a stage name, means "the doer" in her native Sisaala language. During her late teenage years, she played football as a midfielder. She attended Kanton Secondary School in Tumu, where she acquired a reputation for being a tom-boy, playing football and was in demand as a dancer and entertainer in school productions. She also attended Takoradi Polytechnic and studied art and design.

In 2018, Wiyaala disclosed in an interview with Becky on the E with Becks show on Joy Prime, that she has been married for four years but would not disclose the name of her husband. Only four people were present at her wedding; a lawyer, a judge and her mum and dad.

=== Musical career ===
From early childhood in the Upper West Region of Ghana, Wiyaala was active as an entertainer, earning her first income as a performer in a local bar in Tamale. After completing Kanton Secondary High School, Wiyaala's musical career began in earnest when she joined the local music scene in Wa which centered around Echo Soundz Recording Studios. She performed at local events and recorded as a usually unpaid session singer for artists in the Upper West Region of Ghana.

In 2009, she recorded her first album Tuma ("Work") in the Sissala language at Echo Soundz Studios in Wa. Songs like "Dannu" and "Dirik…" soon became local hits.

Looking to establish a national career, she made the journey to Accra to audition at Music reality show "Starz of the Future". Wiyaala did not impress her first two attempt, but at her third try in 2011, she went all the way to the finals, winning two Golden Moments awards. She won the 2012 Vodafone ICONS Mixed Edition hosted by fellow Ghanaian DJ "Benny Blanco", as part of the Ghanaian gband Black N Peach, while singing Tina Turner's "Simply The Best".

She left the Black N Peach band during April 2013, after having released one single ("Wonkoa"), to pursue a solo career with Djimba World Records. Her first release was "Make Me Dance" which featured Ghana's first-ever underwater scenes in a music video, and soon afterwards the single "Rock My Body", which quickly became a hit and won her two awards at the 2014 edition of All Africa Music Awards. Wiyaala won two of the coveted 23.9-carat gold-plated trophies for The Most Promising Artist in Africa and The Revelation of the African Continent.

In November 2014, Wiyaala released her "official" debut album, the eponymously titled Wiyaala which was nominated for album of the year at the Vodafone Ghana Music Awards 2015 and at All Africa Music Awards 2015. She won Music Video of the Year with the song "Africa"on 2015 at All Africa Music Awards (AFRIMA).

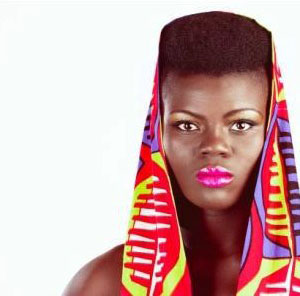
Wiyaala in 2013

After receiving wide acclaims in Ghana and in Africa, Wiyaala began to tour other continents in 2015, performing first in Europe at the Hague African Festival in the Netherlands and later in North America at the Afrikadey Festival in Calgary, Canada. In 2016, at WOMAD UK where the Irish Times noted: "Feisty is not the word – she (Wiyaala) is a powerhouse in the mode of a young Angelique Kidjo, Effervescent and funny, she rocked the crowd and got a great reception" Wiyaala also joined In Place of War's "Voices of The Revolution" directed by Errollyn Wallen, an international collection of female musicians from countries of conflict around the world performing at Ronnie Scott's Jazz Club and UK festivals including Shambala, Hull Freedom Festival.

In 2018, Wiyaala, alongside Ilhan Omar, the first Somali-American to be elected into the US Congress and Sahle-Work Zewde, Ethiopia's first female president and others, was selected as one of BBC News "African Women We Celebrated in 2018".

Wiyalaa toured Europe again in 2019.

In October 2024, Wiyaala partnered with Dominik Jud (professionally known as Dodo), a Swiss musician.

She is featured on Slovenian industrial band Laibach's 2026 album Musick in the title track and the album's first single Allgorythm.

=== Activism ===
Wiyaala is outspoken on the male-dominated culture and polygyny of some African countries and to stand up for women's rights and against family violence in her native Ghana. Her song "Tinambayai" in Sisaala language has been regarded as a protest against the exploitation of women in Africa. Wiyaala was featured on the BBC, talking about early child marriage and declaring her support for feminism as a means to encourage young girls into completing their education so that they can be the ones that make the choices in their lives. She said her success will serve as an example to her community that there was a future for young women beyond early or forced marriage. "Make Me Dance" was included in the top of feminist songs for the 2013 winter by Bitch feminist magazine.

Wiyaala has partnered with the Ministry of Gender, Children and Social Protection of Ghana's government and UNICEF on several projects to help protect the rights of children and public health issues.

== Musical style ==
Wiyaala sings both in English and her native language Sisaala. She writes her songs herself. She has earned praises for her bold and powerful voice and distinguished timbre. She credits Madonna, Michael Jackson, Whitney Houston and Tina Turner as her role models and inspiration. She also expressed admiration for African artists like Angelique Kidjo, Miriam Makeba and Brenda Fassie. Her song "Africa" which earned her a continental award in 2015 was inspired by the Mama Africa song by compatriot, Sherifa Gunu. She has often been called "man-woman" and she has built her brand around the androgynous image of herself and for that she has been compared to Jamaican singer, Grace Jones.

Her music style has been described as Afro-pop or Afro-rock with elements of tribal folk music while the latest single "Rock My Body", released in June 2013 together with Ghanaian reggae singer Jupitar leans more towards reggae and dancehall. Wiyaala cited as inspiration the 1969 song "Wreck A Buddy" by Nora Dean and The Soul Sisters. She did also perform in the opening of the 2014 Stanbic Ghana jazz festival.

The single "Go Go Black Stars...Goal!", released in April 2014, on the Djimba World Records label, sung in English and Ghanaian languages, also features tribal drums and stadium choruses. The same song had been picked up as the unofficial hymn of the national football team of Ghana for the 2014 World Cup.

Wiyaala got nominated as Best Sporting Artist in Ghana Sports Excellence Awards 2014.

== Discography ==
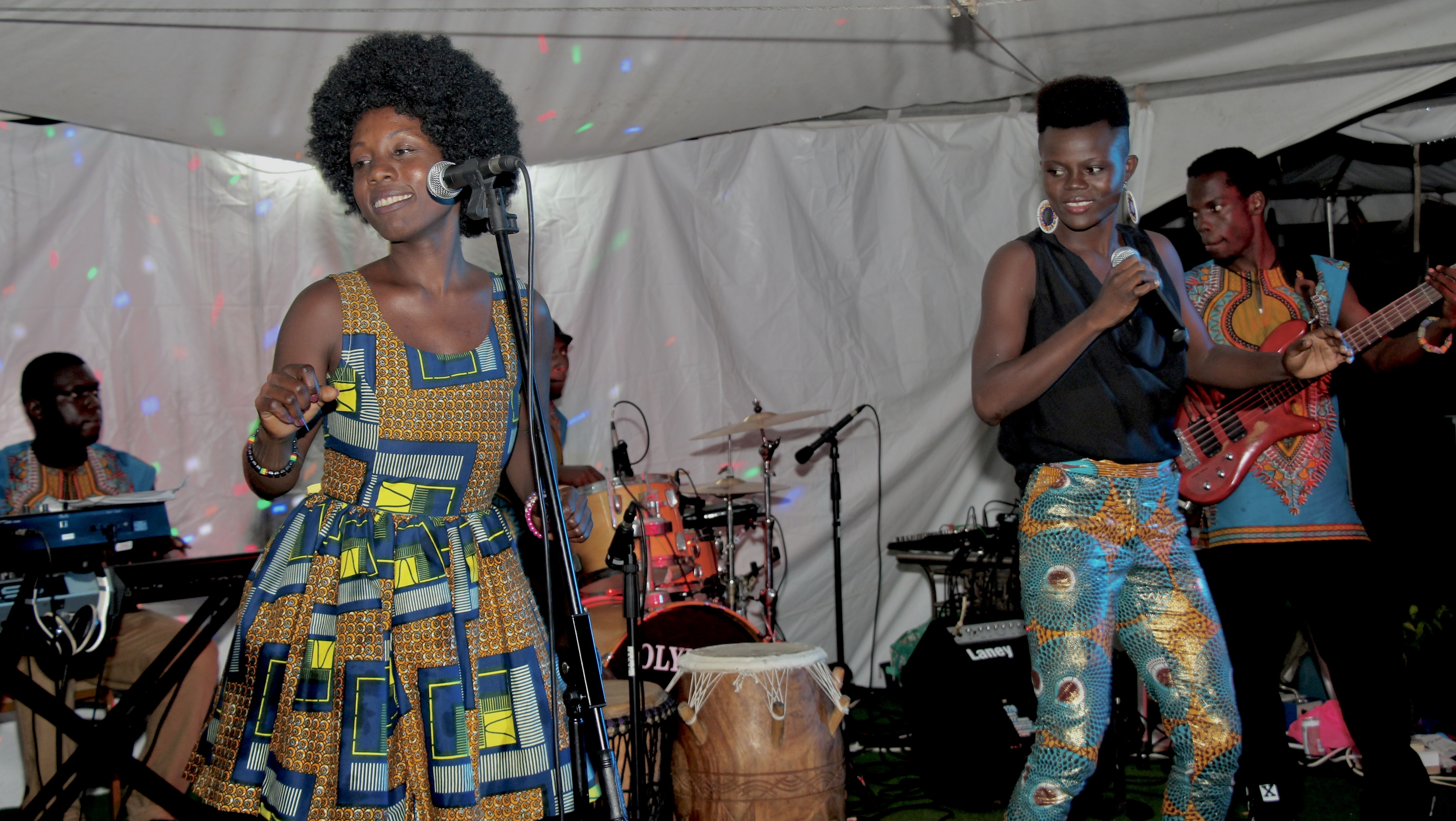
Wiyaala (right) performing with her band

Wiyaala's first release after the breakup with Black N Peach was the single "Make Me Dance". Originally produced by "Genius Selection" in Ghana, it has been remixed in Los Angeles by "Bill Delia" for the international market. "Make Me Dance", along with an acoustic version, will be distributed on the "Djimba World Records" label under exclusive license to Paris-based "JTV Digital". The single has been released internationally on 7 October 2013, and it is available on iTunes.

The music video "Make Me Dance" was shot in the studio and on location at Prampram. It features Wiyaala in scenes shot underwater and dancers from the Henokami Culture Troupe from New Ningo. Wiyaala had to take swimming lessons for the best performance while on camera.

"Make Me Dance" got released also in remixed form in Nu-disco, Breakbeat, Drum and bass and Trance styles on 9 December 2013. The "Make Me Dance" Remix EP was mastered in the Paris-based La Source Mastering Studio and released worldwide through Djimba World Records. On 8 December 2013, Wiyaala and Plug.dj held an online-only listening party of the "Make Me Dance" Remixes EP before the official release.

On 28 February 2014, Wiyaala released a new single, "You Got The Power", again distributed on the "Djimba World Records" label. The single is also available on iTunes.

Her self-titled album was launched in November 2014 at the Alliance Française in Accra. Wiyaala performed songs from her album and other local and international superstars. The show also witnessed picturesque dance performance from Flash Mob Ghana. One major highlight of the event was when her parents joined her on the stage to perform, backed by the Vodafone Icons contestants. She also released her song "Angel" in early December 2014 during Viasat 1's The One Show. The video of the single "Africa" taken from the album won Video of the Year at the All Africa Music Awards in November 2015.

During the first edition of the All Africa Music Awards held on 27 December 2014 in Lagos, Wiyaala won two of the coveted 23.9-carat gold-plated trophies for "The Most Promising Artiste in Africa" and "The Revelation of the African Continent". She has been commended by Vodafone for her achievements and hailed as a youth icon and an inspiration for young Ghanaians to strive for success.

In 2015, Wiyaala received six nominations for the Vodafone Ghana Music Awards winning Best Songwriter and Best Female Vocal. At the second edition of the All African Music Awards 2015, Wiyaala won the best Video for "Africa" directed by Stanley Ajjetey. 2015 saw features on AJ Nelson's "Power to The People" and Dark Suburb's "Mama".

In December 2018, Wiyaala released her second album Sissala Goddess, preceded by the singles "Village Sex" and "When the Lord Get Us Ready". She released music videos for both, as well as one for the fourteenth track on the album Feeling Free.

== Films and television ==
Wiyaala made her TV acting debut in late 2013 in the Viasat 1 hit comedy series MultiKoloured.

In February 2016 Wiyaala made her movie debut in the Ghanaian feature film No Man’s Land. and for which she has been nominated as the Golden Discovery 2016 at the Golden Movie Awards.

== Fashion ==
Wiyaala got nominated "Female Personality of the Year" at the 2014 Ghana's Fashion Icon Awards, with a dress sketched and designed by herself. She designs her stage dresses and jewellery to showcase the culture of the people from her home region. She has also been recognised for her style by winning the Best Individual Style Award at the Glitz 2015 Style Awards.

Recognized for her sense of fashion, stage dressing and style, Wiyaala is influential throughout the world with Hong Kong's South China Morning Post citing her as a role model.

== Philanthropy ==
Wiyaala has made her intentions clear to recruit, groom, and sponsor young talents from Funsi and its surroundings as her way of giving back to society. She built an Arts and Culture Center in her community.

== Videography ==
Year	Title	Director	Ref	Album	Other Artists
2019	Feeling Free	Wiyaala		Sissala Goddess	—N/a
2018	When the Lord Get Us Ready	—N/a		Sissala Goddess	—N/a
2017	Village Sex	Stanley Adjetey		Sissala Goddess	—N/a
2016	Sun And Moon	Charlotte Appleton		Wiyaala	—N/a
2016	Leno	Charlotte Appleton		Wiyaala	—N/a
2016	Power To The People	—N/a		Africa Rise	AJ Nelson
2015	Angel	Charlotte Appleton		Wiyaala	—N/a
2015	This Is Who I Am	—N/a		Non-Album Single	—N/a
2014	Africa	Stanley Ajjetey		Wiyaala	—N/a
2014	Go Go Black Stars	Charlotte Appleton		Non-Album Single	—N/a
2013	Rock My Body	Charlotte Appleton		Non-Album Single	Jupitaar
2013	Make Me Dance	Charlotte Appleton		Non-Album Single	—N/a

== Awards and nominations ==
Year	Organisation	Award	Work	Result
2013	4syte Music Video Awards	Best Discovery	Make Me Dance	Nominated
2013	4syte Music Video Awards	Best Reggae/Dancehall	Rock My Body	Nominated
2014	Bass Awards	Music Video of the Year (Dancehall)	Rock My Body	Nominated
2014	Bass Awards	Best Collaboration (Dancehall)	Rock My Body	Nominated
2014	Bass Awards	Best Female Vocal Artist	Rock My Body	Nominated
2014	All Africa Music Awards (AFRIMA)	Best Female Artiste in West Africa	Rock My Body	Nominated
2014	All Africa Music Awards (AFRIMA)	Most Promising Artiste in Africa	Rock My Body	Won
2014	All Africa Music Awards (AFRIMA)	Best African Reggae, Ragga and Dancehall	Rock My Body	Nominated
2014	All Africa Music Awards (AFRIMA)	Revelation of the African Continent	Rock My Body	Won
2014	National Youth Authority Ghana	Youth Achievers Award	N/A	Won
2014	Sissala Prestige Awards	Female Personality of the Year	N/A	Won
2014	Radio Progress Upper West Music Awards	Music Ambassador for the Upper West	N/A	Won
2014	GH One TV ShowBiz Honours	Revelation of 2014	N/A	Won
2015	Vodafone Ghana Music Awards	Best Female Vocal Performance	Tinambaynyi	Won
2015	Vodafone Ghana Music Awards	New Artiste of The Year	N/A	Nominated
2015	Vodafone Ghana Music Awards	Album of The Year	Wiyaala	Nominated
2015	Vodafone Ghana Music Awards	Songwriter of The Year	N/A	Won
2015	Vodafone Ghana Music Awards	Record of The Year	Tinambaynyi	Nominated
2015	Vodafone Ghana Music Awards	Afro-Pop Song of The Year	Tinambaynyi	Nominated
2015	Glitz Style Awards	Best Individual Style	N/A	Won
2016	Golden Movie Awards	Best Discovery	No Man's Land	Nominated
2017	All Africa Music Awards	Best African Rock	Village Sex	Nominated
2017	Ghana Women Awards Honours	Young and Gifted	N/A	Won
2019	Ghana music awards UK 2019	Best international touring act	N/A	Won

In December 2024, Noella Wiyaala Nwadei was included on the BBC's 100 Women list.

== Tour ==
- Full List of Wiyaala’s Europe Tour 2019 And Their Dates
- Wiyaala European tour 2019
