= Sissala =

Sissala may be,

- Sissala East District, Ghana
- Sissala West District
- Sissala language
