= Jirapa Municipal District =

- Municipal District
- Districts of Upper West Region

- Location of Jirapa Municipal District within Upper West
- Coordinates: 10°31′25.68″N 2°42′12.24″W
- Country: Ghana
- Region: Upper West
- Capital: Jirapa

Government
  - Municipal Chief Executive: Christina Bombanye Amadu
  - Member of Parliament: Dapilah Seidu Cletus

Population (2020)
  - Total: 106,874
- Time zone: UTC+0 (GMT)
- ISO 3166 code: GH-UW-JP

Jirapa Municipal District is one of the eleven districts in the Upper West Region Ghana. Originally it was formerly part of the then-larger Jirapa/Lambussie District in 1988; until the northern part of the district was later split off to create Lambussie-Karni District on 29 February 2008; that is, the remaining part has been renamed as Jirapa District, which was later elevated to municipal district assembly status on 15 March 2018 to become Jirapa Municipal District. The municipality is located in the northwest parts of the Upper West Region and has Jirapa as its capital town.

== Geography ==
The district shares boundaries to the South with Nadowli District, to the East with Sissala District, to the West with Lawra District and to the North with Lambussie-Karni District.

== Sources ==
- "Districts of Ghana". Statoids.
- GhanaDistricts.com
