= Kanton Jina Gbiele Festival =

Festival in Ghana by the people of Tumu

Kanton Jina Gbiele Festival is an annual festival celebrated by the chiefs and people of Tumu Traditional Area in the Upper West Region of Ghana. It is usually celebrated in the month of January.

== Celebrations ==
During the festival, visitors are welcomed to share food and drinks. The people put on traditional clothes and there is durbar of chiefs. There is also dancing and drumming.

== Significance ==
This festival is celebrated to mark an event that took place in the past and make the people think about what happened. The people make companions with the present and adjust their lifestyles. It is claimed this festival is in the remembrance of the Ruler of the people Late Kanton I.
