= Bob-Ngo Festival =

Festival in Ghana by the people of Jirapa

Bob-ngo Festival is an annual festival celebrated by the chiefs and peoples of Jirapa Traditional Area in the Upper West Region of Ghana. It is usually celebrated in the month of April.

== Celebrations ==
During the festival, visitors are welcomed to share food and drinks. The people put on traditional clothes and there is durbar of chiefs. There is also dancing and drumming.

== Significance ==
This festival is celebrated to mark an event that took place in the past. It is celebrated to lift the taboo on the harvesting of the Dawadawa crop which was claimed to be food for the slaves and slave raiders in the past. It is claimed without this festival, it is a taboo to harvest the crop.
