= Sabuli =

Coordinates: 10°34′N 2°31′W

Sabuli is a community in the Jirapa district in Upper West Region of Ghana. Its low altitude of 304 meters above sea level makes it a fertile ground for agriculture purposes. Predominanted by farmers, the community has a total population of 3,190 as of 2006.
