= Sissala District =

- Former District
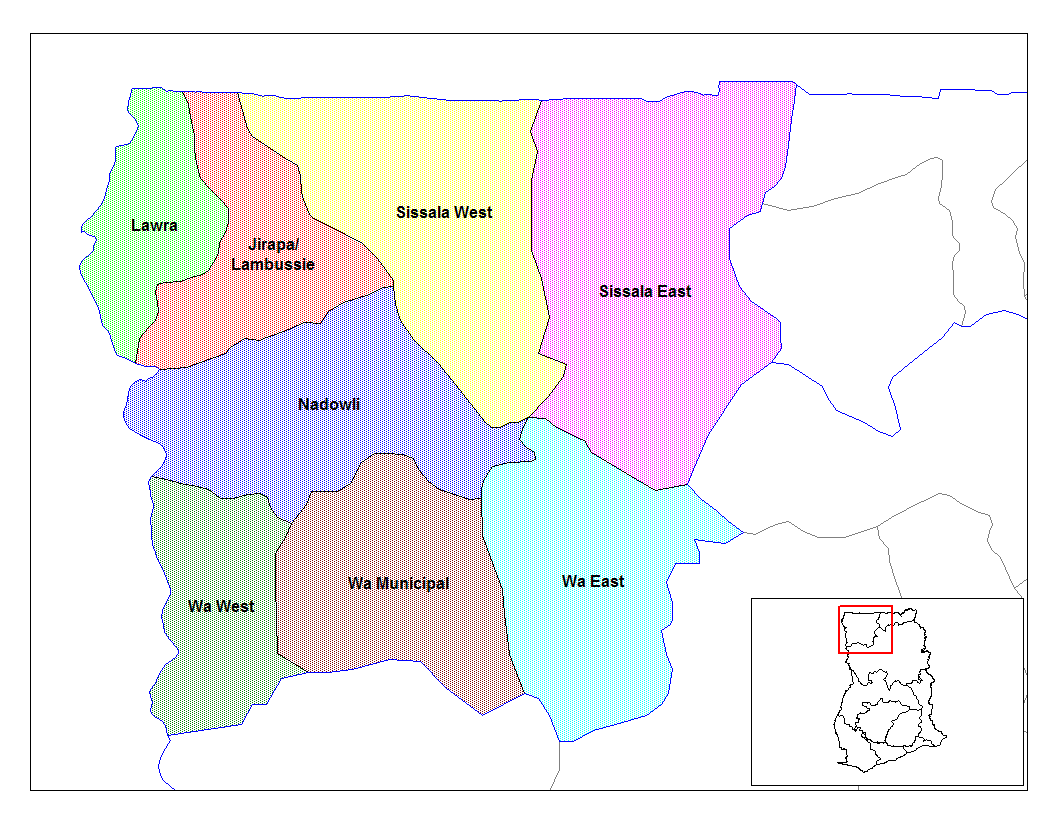
- Districts of Upper West Region

- Location of Sissala District within Upper West
- Coordinates: 10°52′22″N 1°58′49″W
- Country: Ghana
- Region: Upper West
- Capital: Tumu

Population (2013)
  - Total: —
- Time zone: UTC+0 (GMT)
- ISO 3166 code: GH-UW-SS

Sissala District is a former district that was located in Upper West Region, Ghana. Originally created as an ordinary district assembly in 1988. However, in July 2004, it was split off into two new districts: Sissala East District (which it was elevated to municipal district assembly status on 15 March 2018; capital: Tumu) and Sissala West District (capital: Gwollu). The district assembly was located in the northeast part of Upper West Region and had Tumu as its capital town.

== Sources ==
- "Districts of Ghana". Statoids.
