= Pudo =

Coordinates: 10°56′11″N 01°31′20″W

Pudo is a town in Sissala East Municipal District, Upper West Region in northern Ghana near the border with Burkina Faso.

== Mining ==
Historically, the Pudo area has been a significant source of ironware.

Pudo is near significant unexploited iron ore deposits.

== See also ==
- Iron ore in Africa
