= Lawra market =

Trading post in Lawra, Ghana

The Lawra market is a major trading post in Lawra in Upper West Region of Ghana.
