= Tizza, Ghana =

Tizza
- Rural area
- Country: Ghana
- Region: Upper West Region
- District: Jirapa District
- Time zone: GMT
  - Summer (DST): GMT

Tizza is a small town in the Jirapa District of the Upper West Region of Ghana. The People of this town speak Dagaare
