= Gualla Festival =

Festival in Ghana by the people of Lambussie

Gualla Festival is an annual harvest festival celebrated by the chiefs and people of Lambussie Traditional Area in the Upper West Region of Ghana. It is usually celebrated in the month of December.

== Celebrations ==
During the festival, visitors are welcomed to share food and drinks. The people put on traditional clothes and there is durbar of chiefs. There is also dancing and drumming.

== Significance ==
This festival is celebrated to mark an event that took place in the past. It is celebrated for a bumper harvest and used to appease the gods and ancestors for good yields.
