= Tizza =

Tizza or Tizzà may refer to:

== People ==
- Marco Tizza (born 1992), Italian cyclist
- Tizza Covi (born 1971), Italian director

== Places ==
- Tizza, Algeria, hill in Tlemcen Province
- Tizza, Ghana
- Torra di Tizzà, Sartène, Corsica
