= Dzimbi Festival =

Festival in Ghana by the people in the Upper regions

Dzimbi Festival is an annual festival celebrated by the chiefs and people in both the Upper East and Upper West regions of Ghana. It is usually celebrated in the month of June.

== Celebrations ==
During the festival, visitors are welcomed to share food and drinks. The people put on traditional clothes and there is durbar of chiefs. There is also dancing and drumming.

== Significance ==
This festival is celebrated to mark an event that took place in the past.
