= Wa East District =

- District
- Districts of Upper West Region

- Location of Wa East District within Upper West
- Coordinates: 10°17′6″N 1°57′36″W
- Country: Ghana
- Region: Upper West
- Capital: Funsi

Government
  - Member of Parliament: Dr. Godfred Seidu Jesew

Population (2021 census)
  - Total: 91,457
- Time zone: UTC+0 (GMT)
- ISO 3166 code: GH-UW-WE

Wa East District is one of the eleven districts in Upper West Region, Ghana. Originally it was formerly part of the then-larger Wa District in 1988; until two parts of the district were later split off to create Wa East District (from the east) and Wa West District (from the west) respectively in July 2004; thus the remaining part was elevated to municipal district assembly status in the same year to become Wa Municipal District. The district assembly is located in the southern part of Upper West Region and has Funsi as its capital town.

== Sources ==
- "Districts of Ghana". Statoids.
- Wa East District Assembly Official Website
