= List of Ghanaian regions by population =

This is a list of Ghanaian regions by population, ranked according to the latest census, which took place on 26 September 2010. Past census data (1960, 1970, 1984, and 2000) is included for comparison.

(Note: The current boundaries of Ghana's administrative regions were not fully established until 1983. As such, population figures for 1960 and 1970 reflect the analysis of subregional census data from those periods.)

Rank (2021)	Region	Population 2021	Population 2010	Population 2000	Population 1984	Population 1970	Population 1960	Percent of total (2021)
1	Greater Accra	5,455,692	4,010,054	2,905,726	1,431,099	903,447	541,933	17.69%
2	Ashanti	5,440,463	4,780,380	3,612,950	2,090,100	1,481,698	1,109,133	17.64%
3	Eastern	2,925,653	2,633,154	2,106,696	1,680,890	1,209,828	1,044,080	9.49%
4	Central	2,859,821	2,201,863	1,593,823	1,142,335	890,135	751,392	9.28%
5	Northern	2,310,939	2,479,461	1,820,806	1,164,583	727,618	531,573	7.50%
6	Western	2,060,585	2,376,021	1,924,577	1,157,807	770,087	626,155	6.68%
7	Volta	1,659,040	2,118,252	1,635,421	1,211,907	947,268	777,285	5.38%
8	Upper East	1,301,226	1,046,545	920,089	772,744	542,858	468,638	4.22%
9	Bono (former Brong-Ahafo)	1,208,649	2,310,983	1,815,408	1,206,608	766,509	587,920	3.92%
10	Upper West	901,502	702,110	576,583	438,008	319,865	288,706	2.92%
11	Bono East	1,203,400	Brong-Ahafo	Brong-Ahafo	Brong-Ahafo	Brong-Ahafo	Brong-Ahafo	3.90%
12	Western North	880,921	Western	Western	Western	Western	Western	2.86%
13	Oti	747,248	Volta	Volta	Volta	Volta	Volta	2.42%
14	North East	658,946	Northern	Northern	Northern	Northern	Northern	2.14%
15	Savannah	653,266	Northern	Northern	Northern	Northern	Northern	2.12%
16	Ahafo	564,668	Brong-Ahafo	Brong-Ahafo	Brong-Ahafo	Brong-Ahafo	Brong-Ahafo	1.83%
	All Regions	30,832,019	24,658,823	18,912,079	12,296,081	8,559,313	6,726,815	100.0%

== See also ==
- Regions of Ghana
- List of Ghanaian regional ministers
- List of Ghanaian regions by area
