= Gwollu Defence Wall =

Material cultural heritage site in Ghana

The Gwollu Defence Wall is a historic wall in the Upper West Region of Ghana. The wall is located near the Burkina Faso-Mali border. It was built as a defense against slave traders.

== History ==
The Gwollu Defence Wall was built in the 19th century by Gwollu Koro Limann. The wall is one of many relics of the slave trade. The region was marked by violent raids led by warlords Babatu and Samori. To prevent these attacks, two walls were built. One was to protect homes in the community, while the other encircled farms and bodies of water. It is believed that construction took about 10–25 years each, but neither was completed. The walls were abandoned when the Atlantic slave trade was abolished, although local slave traders were still a problem. Only the portion that surrounds Gwollu remains.

== See also ==
- Gbele Resource Centre
