= Bagri Festival =

Festival in Ghana by the people of Jirapa, Lawra and Nandom

Bagri Festival is an annual festival celebrated by the chiefs and people of Jirapa, Lawra and Nandom in the Upper West region of Ghana. It is usually celebrated in the month of April to January.

== Celebrations ==
During the festival, visitors are welcomed to share food and drinks. The people put on traditional clothes and there is durbar of chiefs. There is also dancing and drumming.

== Significance ==
This festival is celebrated to mark an event that took place in the past. It is also celebrated as a festival of cult and ritual performances that are associated with the Bagri, a cult claimed to produce its members in the area. The Bagri is also said it is meant to purify the people of the land.
