= Wa Senior High Technical School =

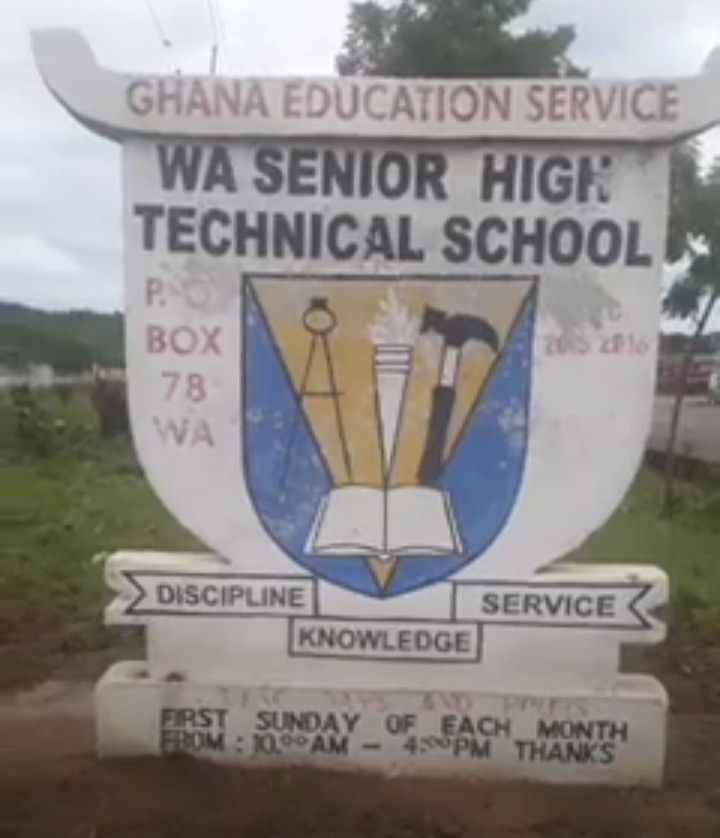
- Entrance of the school

Location
- P. O. Box 79; Wa; Upper West Region Wa Senior High Technical School; Wa; Ghana
- Coordinates: 10°03′31.9″N 2°30′43.8″W

Information
- School type: Public High School coeducational
- Motto: Knowledge and Service
- Established: 1950; 76 years ago
- Status: active
- Oversight: Ministry of Education
- Gender: Unisex
- Age: 14 to 20
- Nickname: Wa Sec Tech
- Affiliation: Ghana

Wa Senior High Technical School is a coeducational second cycle institution at Wa in the Upper West Region of Ghana. The school which was formerly called Wa Secondary Technical, houses both day (non-boarding) and boarding students at its premises and is precisely located at Konta opposite the Ghana Water Company.

== History ==
The school was established as a community middle day school in the 1950s. Progressively, the school became a junior secondary school in 1978 and later transformed into a community secondary technical school in 1982. It was formally commissioned as a community day secondary technical school on 30 March 1983. With the enactment of the educational reforms in 2004 the school became known as Wa Senior High Technical School.

In 2012, the Ghana Education Service granted the school a boarding status following the implementation of several infrastructural development by the government through the Ghana Education Trust Fund (GETFUND). Currently the school boasts of a student population of about 2200.

== Facilities ==
The school houses numerous educational facilities that complement the studies of students. The Upper West Region French center is located in the school so French students normally don't face problems with the subject.

It has a world standard science laboratory, a library and many other useful facilities. Aside the school's science laboratory, the regional science laboratory is also located on the school's campus.

== Courses ==
The school offers courses in Science, General Art, Visual Art, Technical and Home Economics.

== Notable alumni ==
- Hon. S.K. Alban Bagbin - former health minister and the MP (member of parliament) for Nadowli Kaleo constituency.
- Yonny Kulendi - Justice of the Supreme Court of Ghana (2020-)
- Kwesi Nyantakyi - President of the Ghana Football Association (2005-2018)
- Hon. Rasheed Pelpuo(Dr.) - former deputy speaker of parliament and the MP elect of Wa central constituency.
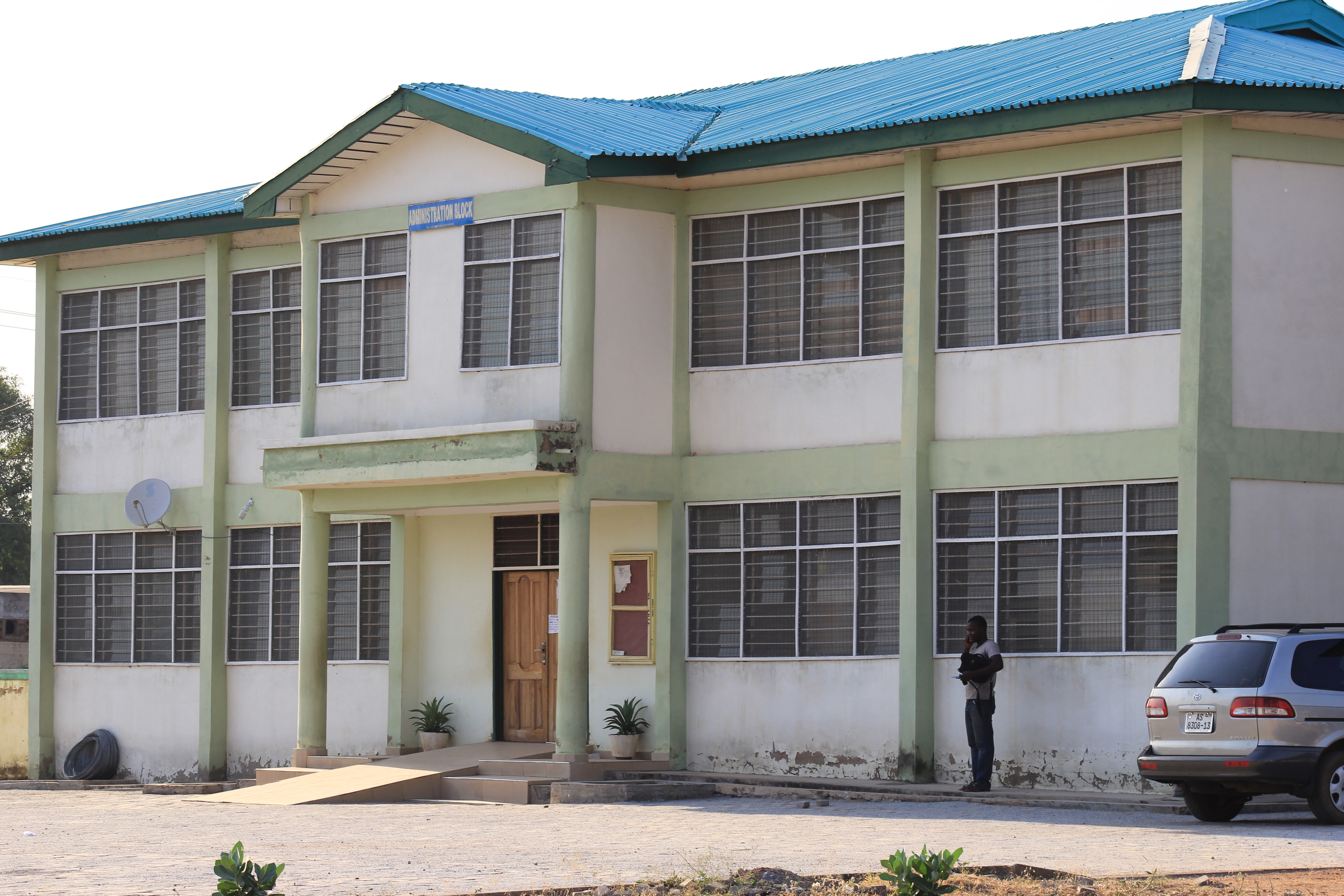
  Administrative block of the school
