= St. Francis Girls' Senior High School =

Secondary school in Ghana

Saint Francis of Assisi Girls' Secondary School is the only girls' secondary school located in Jirapa in the Upper West Region of Ghana.

== History ==
It was established by the Roman Catholic Church under the authority of the late Rt. Rev. Gabriel Chapagne, of the Missionaries of Africa, the then Bishop of Tamale and the late Cardinal Peter Porekuu Dery as co-founders in collaboration with the Sisters of the Franciscan Missionaries of Mary(FMM), an international women religious congregation in 1959 as the first girls' secondary school in North Ghana. Currently the student population is around 1200. It is situated on Wa-Hamile Trunk road, about 2 kilometers away from the main township of Jirapa. St. Francis of Assisi, Jirapa is an all girls boarding school. The students are from every region of Ghana. This all girls Catholic High School has a sister school: St. Francis Catholic High School in Sacramento, California, USA. Motto: Ad Veritatem per Caritatem which means “Truth Through Charity”

== Achievement ==
St. Francis Girls Senior High School is counted as an "A" category of schools in Ghana with a high level of academic discipline and hard work among students and working staff.
