= Nandom Municipal District =

- Municipal District
- Districts of Upper West Region

- Location of Nandom Municipal District within Upper West
- Coordinates: 10°51′9.36″N 2°45′38.16″W
- Country: Ghana
- Region: Upper West
- Capital: Nandom

Population (2021 census)
  - Total: 51,328
- Time zone: UTC+0 (GMT)
- ISO 3166 code: GH-UW-ND

Nandom Municipal is one of the eleven districts in Upper West Region, Ghana. Originally it was formerly part of the then-larger Lawra/Nandom District in 1988; until the northern part of the district was later split off to create Nandom District on 28 June 2012; thus the remaining part has been renamed as Lawra District (which it was elevated to municipal district assembly status on 15 March 2018 to become Lawra Municipal District). However on 27 January 2020, it was elevated to municipal assembly status to become Nandom Municipal Assembly. The municipality is located in the northwest part of Upper West Region and has Nandom as its capital town.
