= Regional minister =

A regional minister may refer to:

- Regional minister (Ghana), ministerial position in Ghana
- Regional minister (England), former ministerial position in the UK Government for regions of England
- Regional minister (New South Wales), position in the Government of New South Wales, Australia
- Regional minister (Western Australia), former position in the Government of Western Australia, Australia
