= List of Ghanaian regions by area =

Regions of Ghana - Ghanaian Sign Language

The following table presents a listing of Ghana's 16 regions ranked in order of their surface area.

Rank	Region	km^{2}
1	Northern	26,524
2	Ashanti	24,869
3	Western	23,941
4	Volta	9,570
5	Eastern	19,323
6	Upper West	18,476
7	Central	9,908
8	Upper East	8,842
9	Greater Accra	3,245
10	Savannah	35,862
11	North East	9,074
12	Bono East	22,952
13	Oti	11,066
14	Ahafo	5,193
15	Bono	11,481
16	Western North	10,074

== See also ==
- Regions of Ghana
- List of Ghanaian regional ministers
- List of Ghanaian regions by population
- Ghanaian Government Official Listing of Regions In Ghana
