= Sissala West District =

- District
- Districts of Upper West Region

- Location of Sissala West District within Upper West
- Coordinates: 10°58′54″N 2°13′18″W
- Country: Ghana
- Region: Upper West
- Capital: Gwollu

Government
  - District Executive: Moses Dramani Luri

Population (2021 census)
  - Total: 63,828
- Time zone: UTC+0 (GMT)
- ISO 3166 code: GH-UW-SW

Sissala West District is one of the eleven districts in Upper West Region, Ghana. Originally it was formerly part of the then-larger Sissala District in 1988; until the western part of the district was later split off to create Sissala West District in July 2004; thus the remaining part has been renamed as Sissala East District (which it was later elevated to municipal district assembly status on 15 March 2018 to become Sissala East Municipal District). The district assembly is located in the northern/northeast part of Upper West Region and has Gwollu as its capital town.

== Points of interest ==
The Gbele Resource Centre is partly located in this district.

== Sources ==
- "Districts of Ghana". Statoids.
