= Yonny Kulendi =

Ghanaian lawyer & judge (born 1963)

Justice Emmanuel Yonny Kulendi

Justice of the Supreme Court of Ghana
- Incumbent
- Assumed office 2020
- Appointed by: Nana Akufo-Addo

Personal details
- Born: 29 November 1963 (age 62) Issa, Upper West Region
- Spouse: Emefa Hodo-Kulendi
- Children: Timbille Kulendi, Wenona Kulendi, Mwinisori Kulendi, Yonny Kulendi Jnr, Anthony Mensah Wisdom,  Adu Gyamfi Mensah , Percy Mensah,
- Education: Wa Senior High Technical School; Navrongo Senior High School; New Juaben Senior High Commercial School
- Alma mater: University of Ghana
- Profession: Judge

Emmanuel Yonny Kulendi (born 29 November 1963) is a Ghanaian judge. He is an active Justice of the Supreme Court of Ghana. He was nominated and appointed a Supreme Court judge in 2020.

== Early life and education ==
Kulendi was born on 29 November 1963. He hails from Issa, a village in the Upper West Region of Ghana. His father was a World War II veteran and his mother brewed and sold Pito in Wa Zongo. He is the fourth of seven children of his mother.

He had his early education at Ndama Primary School before proceeding to Wa Secondary School (now Wa Senior High Technical School). During his fifth year in secondary school, he spent almost two years in the Wa prisons on remand, and this incident made him resolve all the more to be a lawyer. Following the incident, Kulendi joined Navrongo Senior High School where he registered as a private student for his O-Level examination. He later proceeded to New Juaben Senior High School from 1985 to 1987, where he had his sixth form. From 1988 to 1989, he was at the Kwame Nkrumah University of Science and Technology. He later transferred to the University of Ghana where he was awarded his bachelor of laws degree in 1992. He continued at the Ghana School of Law, becoming a barrister-at-law in 1994. He holds a master of arts degree in International Security and Civil-Military Relations from the Naval Postgraduate School in Monterey, California, United States.

== Career ==
Kulendi had his advanced level national service in Bolgatanga and his post-university national service at the Legal Aid Board of Accra. After his service, he joined the Akufo-Addo, Prempeh and Co. Chambers, where he underwent pupilage. He later founded his own law firm, Kulendi @ Law, where he worked as the firm's managing partner until his appointment to the bench. As a lawyer, his areas of expertise included; Investments, Securities, Commercial Law, Criminal Law, and Litigation. Kulendi is a Fellow of the inaugural class of the Africa Leadership Initiative-West Africa and a member of the Aspen Global Leadership Network. He also served as an examiner at the Ghana School of Law.

== Supreme Court appointment ==
On 17 March 2020, the president, Nana Akufo-Addo informed the Speaker of Parliament, Mike Oquaye that consultations had been completed for the nomination of Kulendi and three other persons to be made justices of the Supreme Court of Ghana. The speaker of parliament announced his nomination together with the three others to parliament on 19 March 2020 for vetting and approval.

Kulendi was vetted, together with Justice Henrietta Mensa-Bonsu, on Tuesday 12 May 2020. Following his vetting by parliament, Kulendi was approved by parliament on Wednesday, 20 May 2020, and sworn into office on Tuesday 26 May 2020. Kulendi became the first Ghanaian from the Upper West Region to be appointed to serve on Ghana's highest court of jurisdiction.

His appointment also now makes him a part of a small group of persons who were called to the Supreme Court bench directly from the bar. They include; Edward Akufo-Addo who went on to become a Chief Justice of Ghana and the second president of Ghana, Justice Robert Samuel Blay who became the first president of the Ghana Bar Association and Justice Nene Amegatcher who was also once president of the Ghana Bar Association.

== Personal life ==
Kulendi is married, and a father of four children.
