= Lambussie-Karni District =

- District
- Districts of Upper West Region

- Location of Lambussie-Karni District within Upper West
- Coordinates: 10°50′38″N 2°42′34.56″W
- Country: Ghana
- Region: Upper West
- Capital: Lambussie

Government
  - District Executive: Kofi Bom D-yaka

Area
  - Total: 1,356.6 km^{2} (523.8 sq mi)

Population (2021)
  - Total: 51,118
- Time zone: UTC+0 (GMT)
- ISO 3166 code: GH-UW-LK

Lambussie Karni District is one of the eleven districts in Upper West Region, Ghana. Originally it was formerly part of the then-larger Jirapa/Lambussie District in 1988; until the northern part of the district was later split off to create Lambussie-Karni District on 29 February 2008; thus the remaining part has been renamed as Jirapa District (which it was later elevated to municipal district assembly status on 15 March 2018 to become Jirapa Municipal District). The district assembly is located in the northwest part of Upper West Region and has Lambussie as its capital town.

== Geography ==
Lambussie-Karni District is located in the north western corner of the Upper West Region of Ghana. It lies approximately between Latitudes 10.250 and 11.000 North and Longitudes 20.250 and 20.400 West. It is the smallest district in the region and covers a total land area of 1,356.6 km^{2}. It contributes about 6% of the region's land area which is 18,476 km^{2}. It extends from Hamile in the north to Karni in the south. It is bordered to the south by the Jirapa District, to the north by Ghana's boundary with Burkina Faso, to the west by the Lawra District and to the east by the Sissala West District. The district capital, Lambussie, is about 92 km away from Wa, the regional capital of the Upper West Region.

== Sources ==
- "Districts of Ghana". Statoids.
- GhanaDistricts.com
