= Kobine =

Ghanaian traditional dance and festival

Kobine is a traditional dance and festival unique to the people of Lawra area of north-western Ghana. They are also called the Dagaaba tribe. The dance and the festival named after it are celebrated in September and October to mark the end of a successful harvest.

== Festival ==
The Kobine festival is celebrated to thank the gods and ancestors for a bumper harvest hence it is known as a festival of harvest and celebration of family. During this time, members of the community who have traveled or settled in other areas away from home, Lawra usually return home to unite with their families and celebrate.

The festival of Kobine lasts four days, with the first day usually reserved for visiting family and friends. The second and third days are the official holidays. A procession of the family heads is accompanied by groups of younger people dressed to represent hunters and elephants.

A number of speeches are made by dignitaries and other guests of honour before the Kobine dance competition begins.

== Dance ==
The Kobine music is produced from kuor, a drum instrument with a base made from a gourd, and dalar, a smaller drum made from the neck of a clay pot.

The men usually dress in beautifully decorated skirts, but are usually bare-chested to demonstrate their masculinity as well as their flexibility while they dance. Other ornaments such as headgear and caps are worn. The women dress similarly to the men, except they generally will wear a blouse. Both men and women wear a ring of bells around the ankles to accentuate their rhythmic moves when they dance.

The dance itself consists of quick rhythmic moves especially with the trunk or upper body. At the peak moves period of the dance, the women will generally cut in and dance in front of their favorite male dancer.
