= List of Ghanaian regions by Human Development Index =

Map of the Ghanaian regions by Human Development Index in 2017. Legend: 0.600 – 0.699 0.500 – 0.599 0.000 – 0.499

This is a list of regions of Ghana (2018 borders) by Human Development Index as of 2023 with data for the year 2022.

Rank	Region	HDI (2022)
Medium human development
1	Greater Accra	0.670
2	Eastern	0.622
3	Ashanti	0.618
4	Western	0.611
5	Volta Region	0.603
5	Central Region	0.602
–	Ghana (average)	0.602
6	Brong-Ahafo	0.591
8	Upper East	0.565
Low Human Development
9	Upper West	0.536
10	Northern Region	0.496

== See also ==
- List of countries by Human Development Index
