= Paasaal language =

Gur language of Ghana

Paasaal
- Southern Sisaala
- Pasaale Sisaala
- Region: Ghana
- Native speakers: 53,000 (2017)
- Language family: Niger–Congo?: Atlantic–Congo; Gur; Southern; Gurunsi; Western; Sisaala; Paasaal
- Dialects: Gilbagala; Pasaali

Language codes
- ISO 639-3: sig
- Glottolog: paas1238

Paasaal, or Pasaale Sisaala (Southern Sisaala) is a Gur language of Ghana, with a thousand speakers in Ivory Coast. The two dialects, Gilbagala and Pasaali, are part of a dialect continuum that continues on into Sisaala.
