= Lawra Municipal District =

Municipal District in Upper West region, Ghana

- Municipal District
- Districts of Upper West Region

- Location of Lawra Municipal District within Upper West
- Coordinates: 10°38′45.24″N 2°52′57.72″W
- Country: Ghana
- Region: Upper West
- Capital: Lawra

Government
  - Municipal Chief Executive: George Yasaame Sulley

Area
  - Total: 509 km^{2} (197 sq mi)

Population (2021)
  - Total: 58,433
- Time zone: UTC+0 (GMT)
- ISO 3166 code: GH-UW-LA

Lawra Municipal is one of the eleven districts in the Upper West Region of Ghana. Originally, it was formerly part of the then-larger Lawra District in 1988, until the northern part of the district was later split off to create Nandom District on June 28, 2012; thus, the remaining part has remained as Lawra District, which was later elevated to municipal assembly status on March 15, 2018 to become Lawra Municipal Assembly. The municipality is located in the northwest part of the Upper West Region and has Lawra as its capital town.

== Geography and climate ==
=== Geography ===
Lawra District lies in the North Western corner of the Upper West Region between Longitudes 2°25"W and 2°45"W and Latitudes 10°20"N and 11°00"N.

It is bounded to the East and South by the Jirapa/Lambussie District and Lambussie-Karni District. The total area of the District as at 2014 (GSS, 2012) is estimated to be 483.6 square kilometres. This constitutes about 2.6% of the Region's total area, which is estimated at 18,476 square kilometres. This follows the splitting of Nandom in 2012 as its own district.

== Sources ==
- "Districts of Ghana". Statoids.
- GhanaDistricts.com
