= Funsi =

District Capital in Upper West Region, Ghana

- District Capital
- Location of Funsi in Upper West region
- Coordinates: 10°17′19″N 1°58′16″W
- Country: Ghana
- Region: Upper West Region
- District: Wa East District
- Elevation: 810 ft (247 m)

Population (2013)
  - Total: —

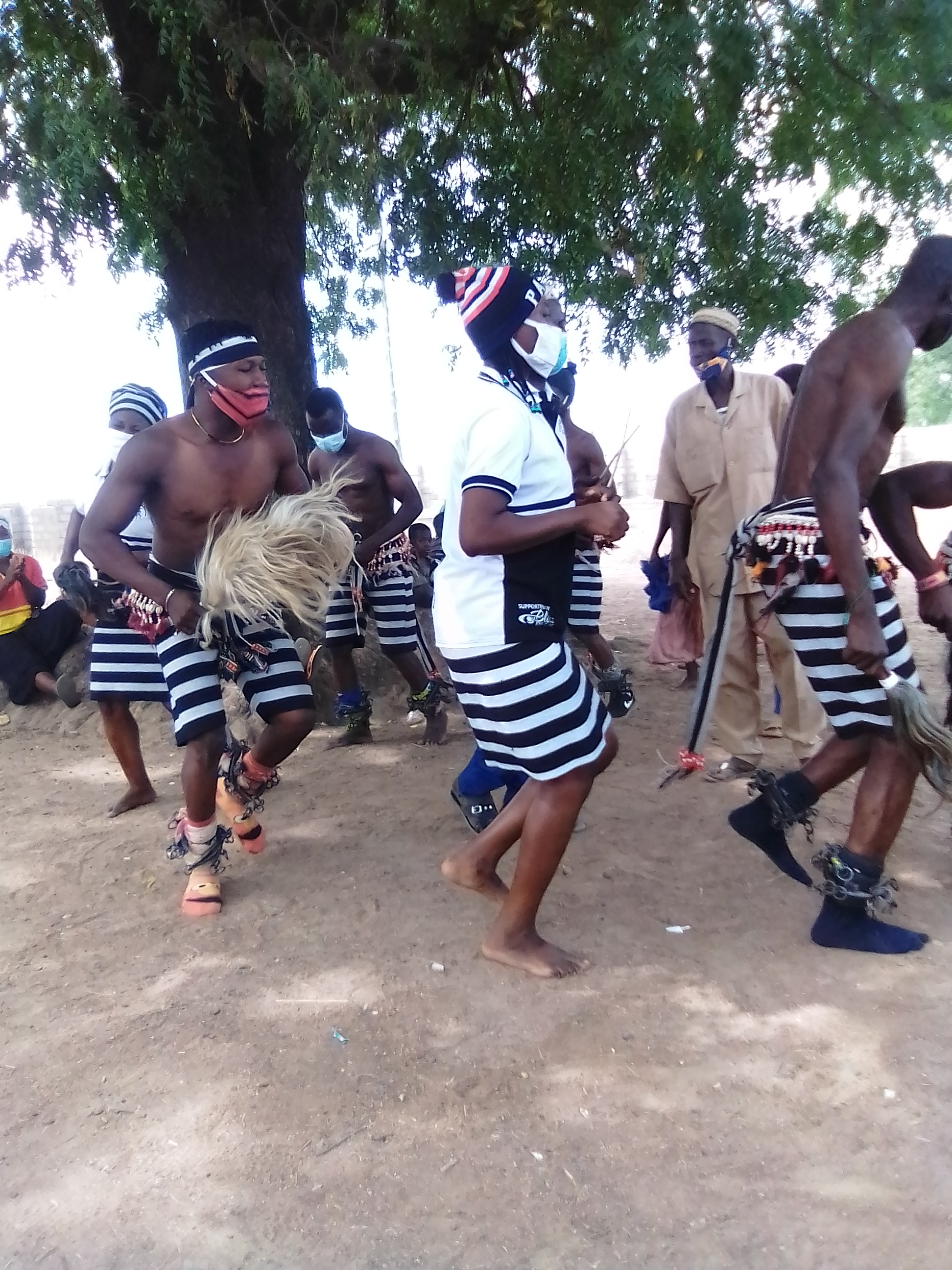
Dance by the people of Funsi.

Funsi is the district capital of the Wa East District in the Upper West Region of north Ghana.

It has been a center of the Gurunsi area of the Upper West of Ghana. In 1948 it had 1,193 people rising to 1,405 in 1960.

Funsi is the location of the Wa Catholic Diocese operated St. John's Health Center, which serves Funsi and surrounding communities.
