= Sisaala language =

Gur language cluster spoken in West Africa

Sisaala
- Sissala
- Region: Ghana, Burkina Faso
- Native speakers: (180,000 cited 1991–2003)
- Language family: Niger–Congo?: Atlantic–Congo; Gur; Southern; Gurunsi; Western; Sisaala

Language codes
- ISO 639-3: Variously: ssl – Western Sisaala sil – Tumulung Sisaala sld – Sisaali sig – Paasaal
- Glottolog: sisa1248

Sisaala (Sissala) is a Gur language cluster spoken in northern Ghana near the town of Tumu and in the neighbouring republic of Burkina Faso. Western Sisaala is intermediate between Sisaali and Tumulung Sisaala.

Paasaal is similar and also called (Southern) Sisaala.

== Distribution ==
Map showing the area Sisaala is spoken.

Sisaala is spoken by the Sissala. The Sisaala in Ghana live in the Northern Region, in the Upper East Region and in the Upper West Region.

Burkina Faso’s Sissili Province is named after the Sissala people.

== Dialects ==
Tumulung Sisaala, which is also known as Eastern Sisaala, is spoken East of Tumu in the Upper West region and Builsa in the Upper East Region. Its name derives from the city of Tumu, which is the traditional capital of the Sisaala people.

Western Sisaala, which is also known as Lambishi Sisaala, is spoken in Tumu in the upper west Region and Gonja in the Northern Region.

Paasaal, which is also known as Pasaale/Southern Sisaala, is spoken between Lambussie and Tumu in the Upper West Region.

Burkina Sisaala, which is also known as Sisaali or Northern Sisaala, is spoken in the Burkinabe Provinces of Sissili and Ioba.
