= List of Ghanaian regional ministers =

The following table presents a listing of Ghana’s regional ministers as of February 2025 under John Mahama.

== Regional ministers ==
Region	Name	Since
Ahafo	Charity Gardner	2025
Ashanti	Frank Amoakohene	2025
Bono	Joseph Addae Akwaboah	2025
Bono East	Francis Owusu Antwi	2025
Central	Ekow Panyin Okyere Eduamoah	2025
Eastern	Rita Akosua Adjei Awatey	2025
Greater Accra	Linda Obenewaa Akweley Ocloo	2025
North East	Ibrahim Tia	2025
Northern	Ali Adolf John	2025
Oti	John Kwadwo Gyapong	2025
Savannah	Salisu Be-Awuribe	2025
Upper East	Akamugri Donatus Atanga	2025
Upper West	Charles Lwanga Puozuing	2025
Volta	James Gunu	2025
Western	Joseph Nelson	2025
Western North	Wilbert Petty Brentum	2025

== See also ==
- List of Mahama Government Ministers
- Regions of Ghana
- List of Ghanaian regions by area
- List of Ghanaian regions by population
