= Nandom =

- Town
- Location within Ghana
- Coordinates: 10°51′00″N 2°45′00″W
- Country: Ghana
- Region: Upper West Region
- District: Nandom Municipal District
- Elevation: 869 ft (265 m)
- Time zone: GMT
  - Summer (DST): GMT

Nandom is the capital town of the Nandom Municipal District of the Upper West Region of Ghana.

Nandom town and the multiple villages that surround it to the north, south, east, and west are inhabited by the Dagara people. The Dagara of the Nandom municipal area and the Dagaaba to the south of Nandom are the same ethnic group, though they speak two different dialects or varieties of the same language. The people of Nandom speak the Lobr dialect, and the Dagaaba to the south speak Ngmere (or Central Dàgááre). People in Nandom use the label 'Dagara' for the language and the people while southern speakers in areas like Jirapa, Nadowli, Kaleo and Daffiama use the label 'Dagaaba' for the people and Dagaare for the language. These are, however, dialectal variation in the pronunciation of the same language rather than names of two dialects, as many people have taken them to be. The varieties of Dagara or Dagaare form a dialect continuum and are multually intelligible.

Nandom used to be part of the Lawra-Nandom District. It became a district by itself in 2012 and in 2020 it became a municipality, called the Nandom Municipal, with a parliamentary representative in the Parliament of Ghana in the capital city of Accra. Nandom town is eight kilometres (five miles) east of the Volta River which is the natural border between Ghana and neighbouring Burkina Faso. There is a road running west of Nandom to the River Volta ending at the village of Dabagteng. Sixteen kilometres (10 mi) north of Nandom is a town called Hamile where there is a formal border between Ghana and Burkina Faso with customs and immigration offices. Many of the towns and villages across the border in southern Burkina Faso also speak the same dialect of Dagara as the people of Nandom. Two other dialects, Wule (a. K.a. Wiile or Ule) and Malba Birifor are also spoken in Burkina Faso.

The Catholic Basilica in Nandom is built of stone and was once the largest Christian church in West Africa. Christian missionary activities in the area were introduced by the Catholic Missionaries of Africa (also called the White Fathers) in the 1930s. The Catholic church was built of stone through labour provided by the native people themselves.

In the middle of the town reside most of the members of the Muslim community. The majority of Muslims are from other parts of Ghana or neighboring Burkina Faso. Most of them are Mossi people from Burkina Faso who settled in the town several decades ago.

Nandom is the home of Nandom Senior High School, a Catholic school established by the FIC Brothers. The town is also home to the Nandom Technical School, also established by the FIC Brothers. FIC stands for "Fratres Immaculatae Conceptionis". St. Anne's Vocational School for girls was established by the Catholic church. There are also elementary schools: St. Andrew School, and St. Paul School. Most of the villages in the area have primary or middle schools.

== See also ==
- Bagri Festival
