= Sissala East Municipal District =

- Municipal District
- Districts of Upper West Region

- Location of Sissala East Municipal District within Upper West
- Coordinates: 10°52′22″N 1°58′49″W
- Country: Ghana
- Region: Upper West
- Capital: Tumu

Government
  - Municipal Chief Executive: Sulemana Alijata Gbentie

Population (2021 census)
  - Total: 80,619
- Time zone: UTC+0 (GMT)
- ISO 3166 code: GH-UW-SE

Sissala East Municipal District is one of the eleven districts in Upper West Region, Ghana. Originally it was formerly part of the then-larger Sissala District in 1988; until the western part of the district was later split off to create Sissala West District in July 2004; thus the remaining part has been renamed as Sissala East District, which it was later elevated to municipal district assembly status on 15 March 2018 to become Sissala East Municipal District. The municipality is located in the northeast/eastern part of Upper West Region and has Tumu as its capital town.

== Populated places ==
- Challu
- Walembelle
- Sakai
- Tumu

== Sources ==
- "Districts of Ghana". Statoids.
