= Gwollu =

Gwollu Gwollu
- District Capital
- Location of Gwollu in Upper West region
- Coordinates: 10°58′52″N 2°13′16″W
- Country: Ghana
- Region: Upper West Region
- District: Sissala West District
- Elevation: 1,191 ft (363 m)

Population (2021)
  - Total: 67,802
- Time zone: UTC0 (UTC)

Gwollu is a small town and is the capital of Sissala West district, a district in the Upper West Region of north Ghana. Hilla Limann, a former Ghanaian president was born and raised here.

The town contains several tourist attractions such as the tomb of Ghana's president Dr. Hilla Limann, a traditional bone setter's center and a slave defense wall. The wall was built in the 19th century as a double circle by Gwollu Koro Limann as a defense against slave raiders.
