= Lambussie =

- District Capital
- Location of Lambussie in Upper West region
- Coordinates: 10°50′N 2°42′W
- Country: Ghana
- Region: Upper West Region
- District: Lambussie Karni District
- Elevation: 955 ft (291 m)

Population (2013)
  - Total: —

Lambussie is a small town and is the capital of Lambussie Karni district, a district in the Upper West Region of north Ghana.
