= Jirapa, Ghana =

Jirapa
- Town
- Location of Jirapa in Upper West region, Ghana
- Coordinates: 10°32′N 2°42′W
- Country: Ghana
- Region: Upper West Region
- District: Jirapa Municipal

Government
  - Municipal chief Executive: Christina Bombanye Amadu
  - Member of Parliament: Dapilah Seidu Cletus
- Elevation: 1,033 ft (315 m)

Jirapa is the capital town of the Jirapa Municipal in the Upper West Region of Ghana.

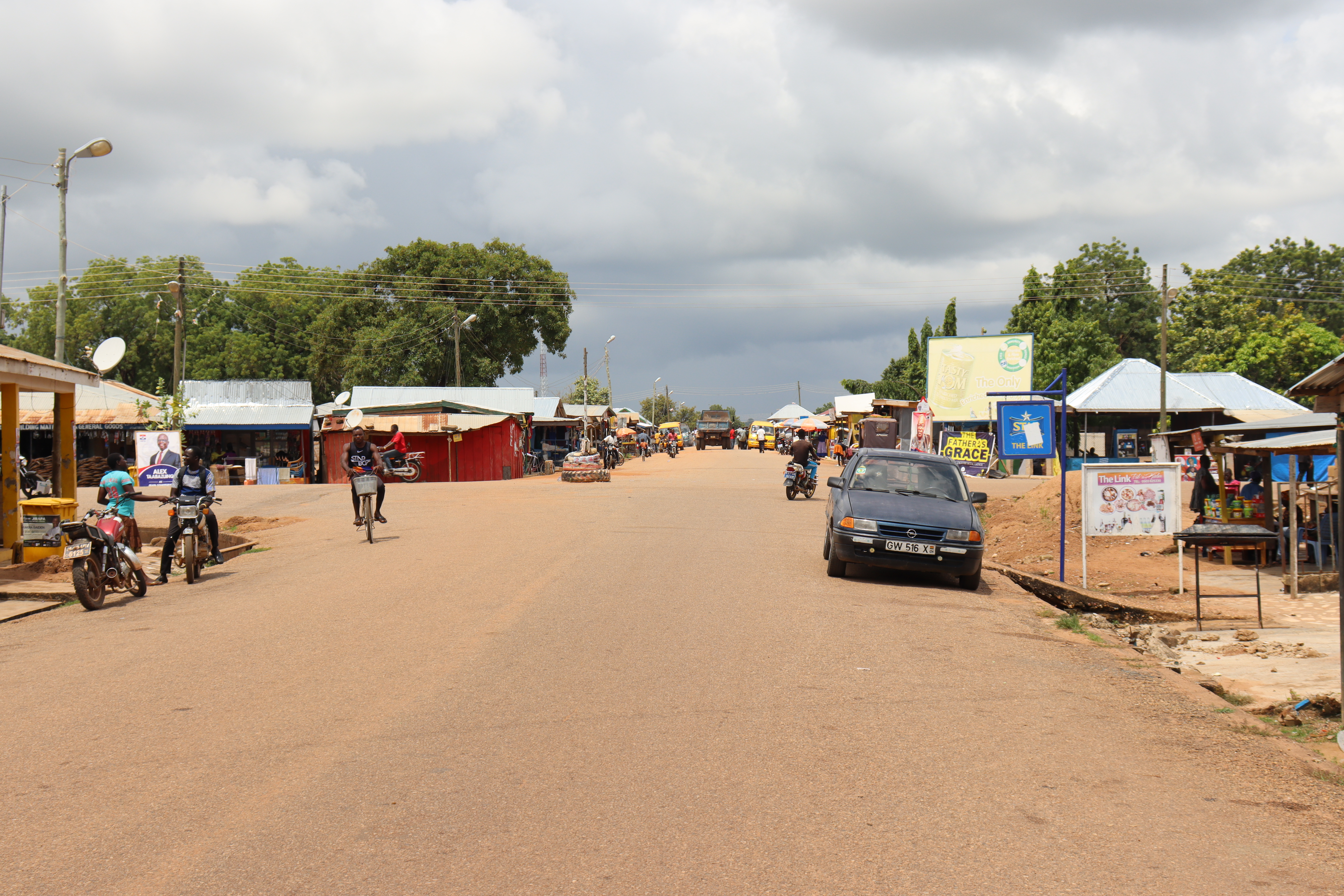
Central roundabout

== Institutions ==
- The only girls' secondary school in the region, St. Francis Girls' Secondary School, is situated in the town.
- Jirapa Senior High School.
- St. Joseph's Hospital in Jirapa is the district hospital. The Franciscan Missionaries of Mary started the work in 1949 as a wound-dressing centre. It was converted to a hospital and adopted by the Catholic Mission of Tamale in 1953. Two training schools originally attached to the hospital are now the autonomous Jirapa Nursing Training College and Jirapa Midwifery Training College. There is also a community health training school known as Jirapa Community Health Nursing Training School
- The St. Joseph Orphanage was renovated in about 2004 by an orphan who is now resident in Italy. It takes up to 40 newborn orphans from nearby hospitals and looks after them during their early childhood.
- St. Joseph Catholic Church is the oldest Catholic Church in the Upper West Region.
- There is a police station and a district magistrate court.
- There is a 5-star hotel named Royal Cosy Hills Hotel, commonly referred to as Jirapa Dubai.

== Religion ==
There is a very strong Roman Catholic tradition in the Jirapa-Lambussie district. The White Fathers opened a mission station first in Navrongo in 1906, from which three men were delegated to work in Jirapa in 1929. They were allotted a plot of land by the Jirapa Naa (chief) who allegedly wanted to see whether they would be driven out by evil spirits, or vice versa. Despite early conflicts between converts and the local chiefs, and even the resulting disapproval of the British District Commissioner of Lawra, the work was given great impetus by the locally famous 'rain event' of 1932 in which rain fell during a severe drought in the Lawra district, only in Jirapa and in nearby villages following prayer for each case. According to government statistics, 42.5% of the population in the district now claim to be Christian, 96.1% of which are Catholic, the remainder being affiliated to either Islam or traditional religion.

== Culture ==
The Chief of Jirapa is the Paramount Chief of the Jirapa traditional area, and is at present Peter Nanfuri, Naa Ansoleh Ganaa II. There is an annual festival called Bong-Ngo in Jirapa for the chiefs and people of the area. It is held in the last week of April and marks the end of the ban on harvesting the fruit of the Dawadawa tree (Parkia Biglobosa) and the beginning of the farming season.

== Language ==
The local people are called Dagaaba, and speak Dagaare, which is a Gur branch of the Niger–Congo language family. The name of the town, written in Dagaare as Gyerebaa, is pronounced roughly as jira-‘baa, and means 'reed-stream', i.e. a stream of reeds.

== See also ==
- Bagri Festival
