= Tumu, Ghana =

Tumu
- Municipal Capital
- Location of Tumu in Upper West region
- Coordinates: 10°53′N 1°59′W
- Country: Ghana
- Region: Upper West Region
- Municipal: Sissala East Municipal
- Elevation: 1,033 ft (315 m)

Population (2013)
  - Total: —
  - Summer (DST): ±0.00

Tumu is a small town and is the capital of Sissala East Municipal Assembly, a municipal in the Upper West Region of northern Ghana, adjacent to the border with Burkina Faso. The Municipality has a population of 80,619, with 39,868 males and 40,751 females, according to 2021 population and housing census. The town consists mainly of the Sissala by tribe. Tumu is connected by road to the town of Navrongo.

Tumu is the nearest town to Gbele Resource Centre, the fourth largest reserve in Ghana.

== Tourism ==
The Tumu town tourist site is based on the environment and the people within the town, starting from the rivers and dams (only) that serve as the main source of water to the nearby people until the Ghana Water Company Limited (GWC) extended their pipelines to almost all parts of the town. The town has one hotel, Hill Top Hotel, a number of Lodges, Gateway Travelers Lodge, and a number of guest house, Silti Guest House, and restaurants..

The Tumu Chief Palace is also one of the oldest palace in the municipality.

== Education ==
- Midwifery Training College, Tumu
- Tumu College of Education
