= Lawra =

- District Capital
- Location of Lawra in Upper West region
- Coordinates: 10°39′N 2°52′W
- Country: Ghana
- Region: Upper West Region
- District: Lawra District

Population (2013)
  - Total: —

Lawra is a small town and is the capital of Lawra district, a district in the Upper West Region of Ghana.

== Location ==
The town is located in the North western part of Ghana. Its distance from Wa, the Regional capital by road is 88.55 Kilometers (55.02 miles).

== Politics ==
Lawra is in the Lawra constituency headed by Hon. Anthony Nyoh-Abeyifaa Karbo of the New Patriotic Party. He succeeded Hon. Samson Abu of the National Democratic congress.

== Tourism ==
Lawra is known for its musical instrument manufacture, and for the Kobine harvest festival with important dancing and musical events.

== See also ==
- Bagri Festival
