= Regions of Ghana =

- Location: Republic of Ghana
- Number: 16 Regions
- Subdivisions: Districts

The regions of Ghana are the first level of subnational government administration within the Republic of Ghana. As of 2020, there are 16 regions, which are further divided for administrative purposes into 260 local metropolitan, municipal and district assemblies (or MMDA's).

== List ==
Region	Capital	Population (2021)	Area (km²)
Ahafo	Goaso	564,668	5,196
Ashanti	Kumasi	5,440,463	24,389
Bono	Sunyani	1,208,649	11,113
Bono East	Techiman	1,203,400	23,248
Central	Cape Coast	2,859,821	9,826
Eastern	Koforidua	2,925,653	19,323
Greater Accra	Accra	5,445,692	3,245
North East Region	Nalerigu	658,946	9,070
Northern	Tamale	2,310,939	26,534
Oti	Dambai	747,248	11,066
Savannah	Damongo	653,266	34,790
Upper East	Bolgatanga	1,301,226	8,842
Upper West	Wa	901,502	18,476
Volta	Ho	1,659,040	9,504
Western	Takoradi	2,060,585	13,842
Western North	Sefwi Wiawso	880,921	10,079

The ten former regions were officially established in 1987, when the Upper West Region was inaugurated as the state's newest administrative region, although it had already functioned as an administrative unit since the break-up of the Upper Region in December 1982, prior to the 1984 national census. A referendum on the creation of six new regions was held on 27 December 2018, where all proposed new regions were approved.

Former region	Capital	New region	Capital
Ashanti	Kumasi	Ashanti	Kumasi
Brong-Ahafo	Sunyani	Bono	Sunyani
Brong-Ahafo	Sunyani	Bono East	Techiman
Brong-Ahafo	Sunyani	Ahafo	Goaso
Central	Cape Coast	Central	Cape Coast
Eastern	Koforidua	Eastern	Koforidua
Greater Accra	Accra	Greater Accra	Accra
Northern	Tamale	Northern	Tamale
Northern	Tamale	Savannah	Damongo
Northern	Tamale	North East	Nalerigu
Upper East	Bolgatanga	Upper East	Bolgatanga
Upper West	Wa	Upper West	Wa
Volta	Ho	Volta	Ho
Volta	Ho	Oti	Dambai
Western	Sekondi-Takoradi	Western	Takoradi
Western	Sekondi-Takoradi	Western North	Wiawso

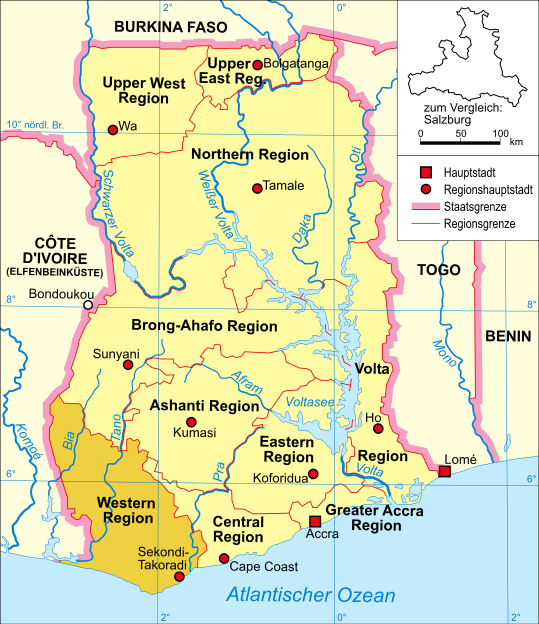
Map of ten former regions

Regional Capitals

== Previous regional configurations ==
=== Independence - 6 March 1957 ===
At independence in March 1957, the Northern Territories, Ashanti, Trans-Volta Togoland and the Gold Coast came together to form Ghana. There were initially five regions. The Trans-Volta Togoland was combined with part of the Eastern Region and Northern Territories to form the Volta Region.

Former region	Capital	New region	Capital
Ashanti	Kumasi	Ashanti Region	Kumasi
Eastern Province	Koforidua	Eastern Region	Koforidua
Eastern Province	(Keta)	Volta Region	Ho
Trans-Volta Togoland	Ho	Volta Region	Ho
Northern Territories	(Saboba)	Volta Region	Ho
Northern Territories	Tamale	Northern Region	Tamale
Western Province	Sekondi	Western Region	Sekondi

=== Post-independence and First Republic ===
On 4 April 1959, the Ashanti Region was split into the Ashanti and Brong-Ahafo regions as a result of the Brong Ahafo Region Act No. 18 of 1959. This was in line with what the Brong Kyempem movement had been campaigning for, which was the recognition of the Bono people as a separate ethnic group from the Ashantis with their own region.

On the day Ghana became a republic, 1 July 1960, the Northern Region got split into the Northern and Upper regions raising the number of regions to seven.

Former region	Capital	New region	Capital
Ashanti	Kumasi	Ashanti	Kumasi
Ashanti	Kumasi	Brong-Ahafo Region	Sunyani
Eastern Region	Koforidua	Eastern Region	Koforidua
Northern Region	Tamale	Northern Region	Tamale
Northern Region	Tamale	Upper Region	Bolgatanga
Volta Region	Ho	Volta Region	Ho
Western Region	Sekondi	Western Region	Sekondi

=== Second Republic ===
During the Second Republic, the Western Region was split into the Western and Central regions, making eight regions in total. This was done ahead of the 1970 census. In 1971, Sekondi and Takoradi were merged to form Sekondi-Takoradi, the new capital of the Western Region.

Former region	Capital	New region	Capital
Ashanti	Kumasi	Ashanti	Kumasi
Brong-Ahafo region	Sunyani	Brong-Ahafo region	Sunyani
Eastern Region	Koforidua	Eastern Region	Koforidua
Northern Region	Tamale	Northern Region	Tamale
Upper Region	Bolgatanga	Upper Region	Bolgatanga
Volta Region	Ho	Volta Region	Ho
Western Region	Sekondi	Western Region	Sekondi-Takoradi
Western Region	Sekondi	Central Region	Cape Coast

=== PNDC era ===
The Provisional National Defence Council, which was the military government in power between 1981 and 1993, promulgated the Greater Accra Law (PNDCL 26) of 23 July 1982 which created the Greater Accra Region. The new region consisted of the Accra Capital District and the Ada Local Council, which were split off from the Eastern Region. In the following year 1983, the Upper Region was divided into the Upper East Region and Upper West Region, bringing the total number of regions to ten.

Former region	Capital	New region	Capital
Ashanti	Kumasi	Ashanti	Kumasi
Brong-Ahafo region	Sunyani	Brong-Ahafo region	Sunyani
Central Region	Cape Coast	Central Region	Cape Coast
Eastern Region	Koforidua	Eastern Region	Koforidua
Eastern Region	Koforidua	Greater Accra Region	Accra
Northern Region	Tamale	Northern Region	Tamale
Upper Region	Bolgatanga	Upper East Region	Bolgatanga
Upper Region	Bolgatanga	Upper West Region	Wa
Volta Region	Ho	Volta Region	Ho
Western Region	Sekondi-Takoradi	Western Region	Sekondi-Takoradi

== See also ==
- List of Ghanaian regional ministers
- List of Ghanaian regions by area
- List of Ghanaian regions by Human Development Index
- List of Ghanaian regions by population
- ISO 3166-2:GH

General:

- Administrative divisions of Ghana
