= Upper West Region =

Region of Ghana

Coordinates: 10°20′N 2°15′W

- Region
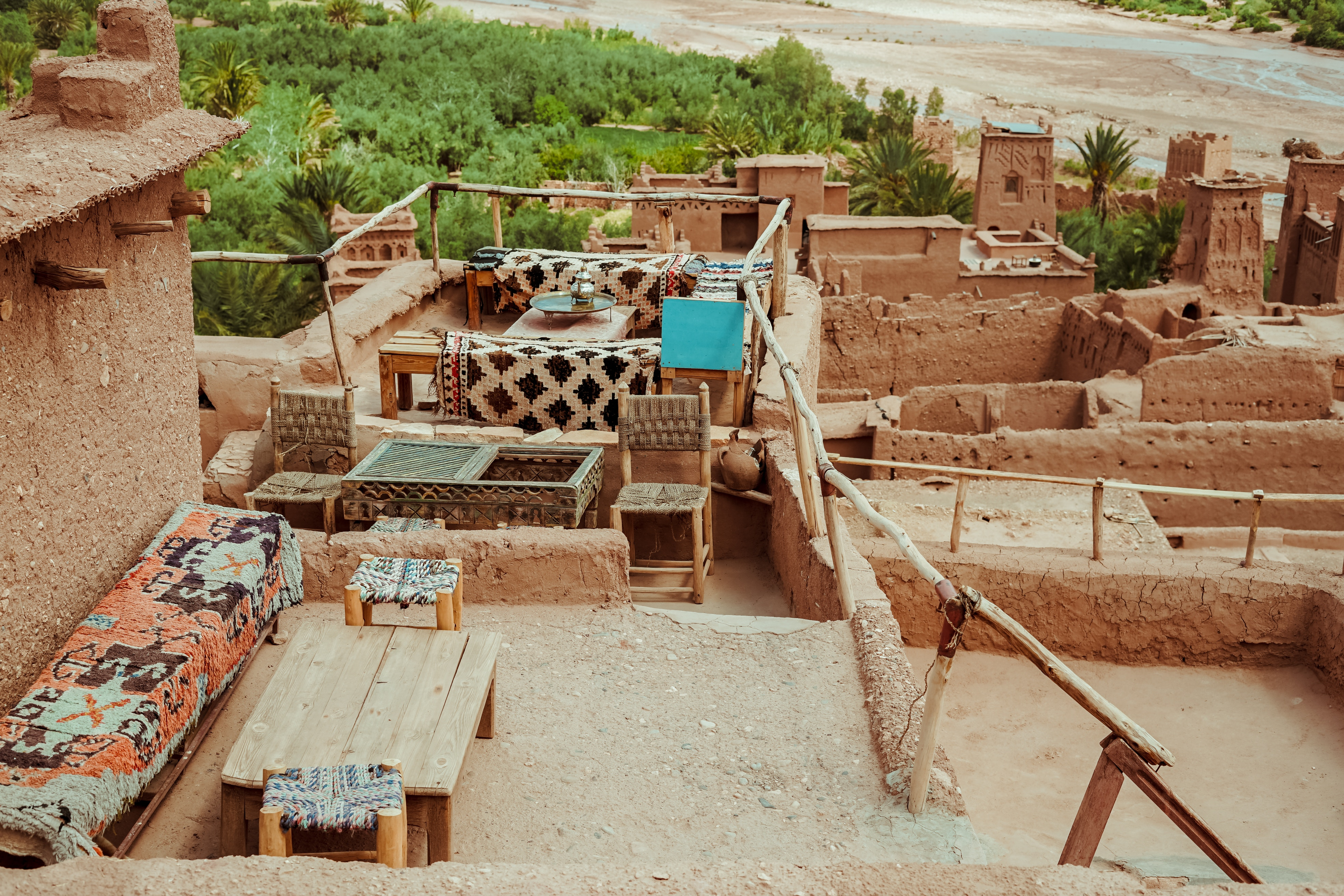

- Location of Upper West Region in Ghana
- Country: Ghana
- Capital: Wa
- Districts: 11

Government
  - Regional Minister: Charles Lwanga Puozuing

Area
  - Total: 18,476 km^{2} (7,134 sq mi)
  - Rank: Ranked 7th

Population (2021 census)
  - Total: 901,502
  - Density: 48.793/km^{2} (126.37/sq mi)

GDP (PPP)
  - Year: 2013
  - Per capita: $5,150

GDP (Nominal)
  - Year: 2013
  - Per capita: $2,500
- Time zone: GMT
- Area code: 039
- ISO 3166 code: GH-UW
- HDI (2017): 0.518 low · 9th

The Upper West Region is a region of Ghana located in the northwestern corner of the country. It is bordered by the Upper East Region to the east, the Northern Region to the south, and the Centre-Ouest and Sud-Ouest regions of Burkina Faso to the west and north. The Upper West regional capital and largest settlement is Wa.

== History ==
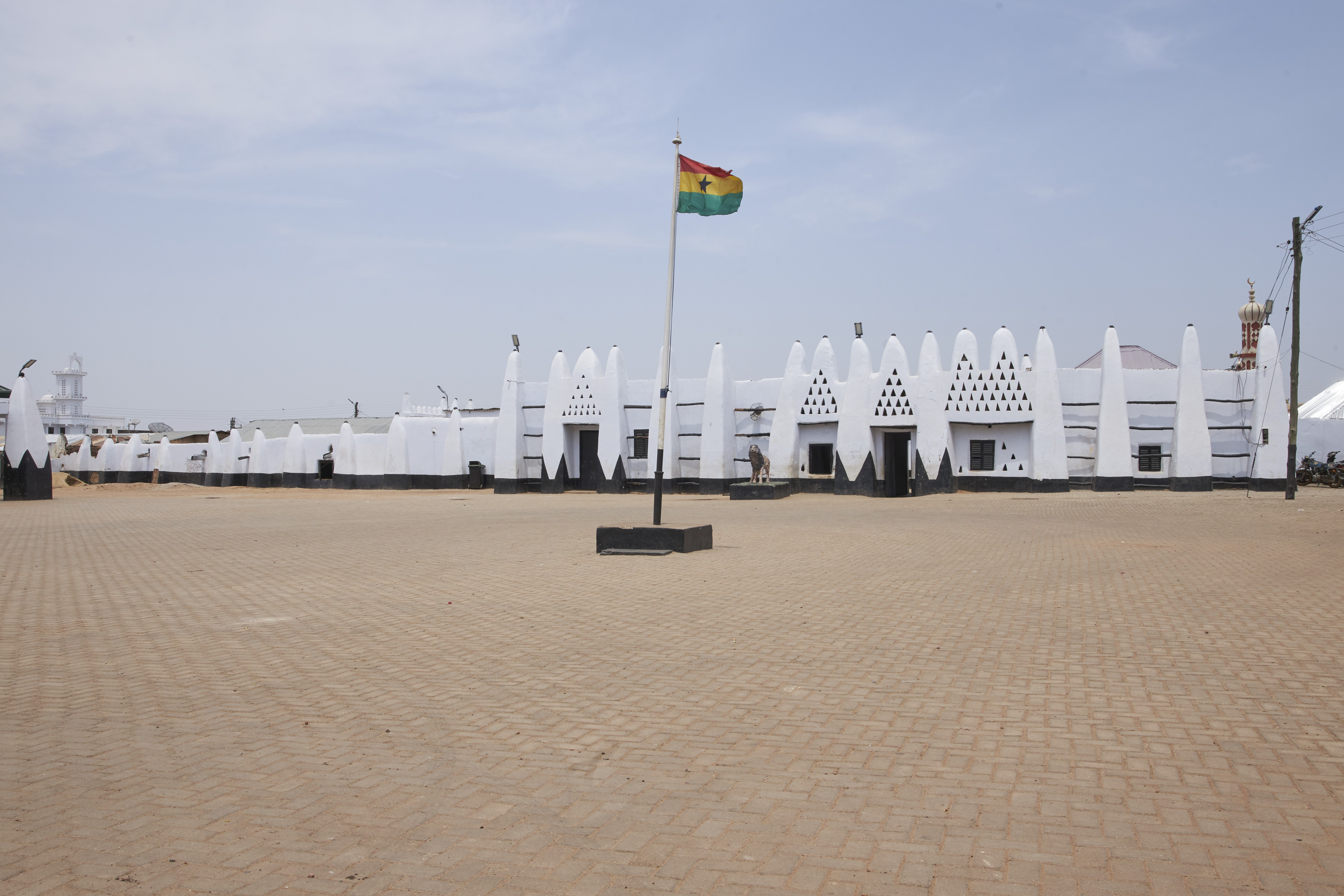
The Wa Naa Palace

The Upper West was created by the then Head of State, Jerry Rawlings in 1983 under the Provisional National Defence Council (PNDC) military regime. The area was carved out of the former Upper Region, which is now the Upper East Region. For about thirty-five years, it remained the youngest region of Ghana until 2018 when six more regions were created by the Nana Addo Dankwa Akufo-Addo government; hence increasing the total number of administrative regions in the country to sixteen.

== Ethnic groups ==
The Upper West Region is inhabited predominantly by three major ethnic groups: Wala, Dagaaba and Sisaala. The Wala people are found in Wa and nearby villages, the western part of the region is occupied is occupied by the Dagaaba and the Sisaala people live in the eastern areas. The Wala people are predominantly Muslims while the Sisaala and Dagaaba are mostly Christian or Traditionalist. The Wala people speak the Wali language, and the Dagaaba speak the Dagaare language.

== Traditional Council ==
Wa has a Council of Chiefs known as The Waala Traditional Council. This council is made up of Several Chiefs and Government Appointees. The current Overlord of the Waala Traditional Area is Wa Naa Fuseini Pelpuo IV who also doubles up as the leader of the Council.

== Geography and climate ==
=== Location and size ===
The Upper West Region is one of the 16 regions of Ghana. It is located at the northwestern corner of Ghana at latitude 9.8°- 11.O° North and longitude 1.6°- 3.0 West, bounded by Burkina Faso to the North. It covers a geographical area of 18,476 square kilometres, representing 12.7% of the total land area of Ghana. The northern Ghana-Burkina Faso is bordered on the east by the Upper East region and Northern regions, on the south by the Northern region, on the west by western Ghana-Burkina Faso, and the Upper West region on the north. It is the seventh largest region in Ghana in total area, and it is made up of 11 districts. By virtue of its location, the Upper West Region has the potential for international and inter-regional trade and other bilateral relations, but the overspill of criminal activities and disasters, such as bushfires, diseases and pestilence, armed robbery, etc., from the region's neighbours also pose a threat.

=== Tourism ===
The Wechiau Hippopotamus Sanctuary is located southwest of Wa, along the Black Volta River in the Wa West District. The Gwollu Wall in the Sissala District serves as the hometown of one of Ghana's past presidents - Dr. Hilla Limann.

== Cuisine ==
The staple food of the people of the Upper West Region is sao or Tuo Zaafi in the local dialect, which is often abbreviated TZ or T-Zed in English.

== Economy ==
The major economic activity of the Upper West Region is agriculture. Crops grown include corn, millet, peanuts, okra, shea tree, and rice. Sheep, goats, chickens, pigs and guinea fowl are raised for meat and eggs. Because the region's dry season is long, extending roughly from October to May, many people leave the region to work in the southern part of Ghana for at least part of the year.

== Sports ==
Basketball (Unicorns Basketball Team), Football, Tennis, Volleyball

== Schools ==
Some popular schools in the region include:

1. St. Francis Xavier Junior Seminary
2. St. Francis Girls of Assisi
3. St. Michael Boys - Nandom
4. St. Ignatius of Loyola SHS
5. Queen of Peace SHS
6. lawra Senior High School
7. Kanton Senior High School
8. Wa Senior High School
9. Wa Senior High Technical School
10. UBIDS formerly UDS
11. Jirapa Nursing Training College
12. Jahan Training College
13. Wa Technical University, etc.

== Administrative divisions ==
The political administration of the region is through the local government system. Under this administration system, the region is divided into 11 MMDA's (made up of 0 Metropolitan, 5 Municipal and 6 Ordinary Assemblies). Each District, Municipal or Metropolitan Assembly, is administered by a Chief Executive, representing the central government but deriving authority from an Assembly headed by a presiding member elected from among the members themselves. The current list is as follows:

Districts of the Upper West Region

Districts of the Upper West Region
#	MMDA Name	Capital	MMDA Type	Population
1	Daffiama-Bussie-Issa	Issa	Ordinary	38,754 (2021)
2	Jirapa	Jirapa	Municipal	106,874
3	Lambussie-Karni	Lambussie	Ordinary	51,118 (2021)
4	Lawra	Lawra	Municipal	58,433
5	Nadowli-Kaleo	Nadowli	Ordinary	77,057 (2021)
6	Nandom	Nandom	Municipal	51,328
7	Sissala East	Tumu	Municipal	80,619 (2021)
8	Sissala West	Gwollu	Ordinary	63,828 (2021)
9	Wa East	Funsi	Ordinary	91,457 (2021)
10	Wa Municipal	Wa	Municipal	200,672 (2021)
11	Wa West	Wechiau	Ordinary	96,957 (2021)

== Notable natives ==
Prominent and famous citizens of Upper West Region include:

- President Dr. Hilla Limann from Gwollu
- Cardinal Peter Poreku Dery from Nandom
- Hon. Joseph Yieleh Chireh from Wa West
- Peter Nanfuri from Jirapa
- Kwesi Nyantakyi from Wa
- Samini from Wa-Sombo
- Wiyaala from Funsi
- Benjamin Kunbuor from Nandom
- Rt. Hon. Alban Sumana Kingsford Bagbin from Sombo
- Ambrose Dery from Nandom
- Chief Simon Diedong Dombo from Jirapa
- Justice Yonni Kulendi from Issa
- Hon. Dr. Rashid Pelpuo from Wa

== Festivals of the Upper West Region ==
Festivals that take place in the Upper West Region include:

- Damba Festival
- Dumba Festival
- Paaragbiele Festival
- Kobine Festival
- Kakube Festival
- Gologo/Golib Festival
- Fao Festival
- Kalibi Festival
- Samanpiid Festival
- Feok Festival
- Adaakoya Festival
- Kuure Festival
- Tengana Festival
- Boaram Festival
