= Anthony Karbo =

Ghanaian politician (born 1979)

The Honourable Anthony N-Yoh Puowele Abayifaa Karbo (MP)
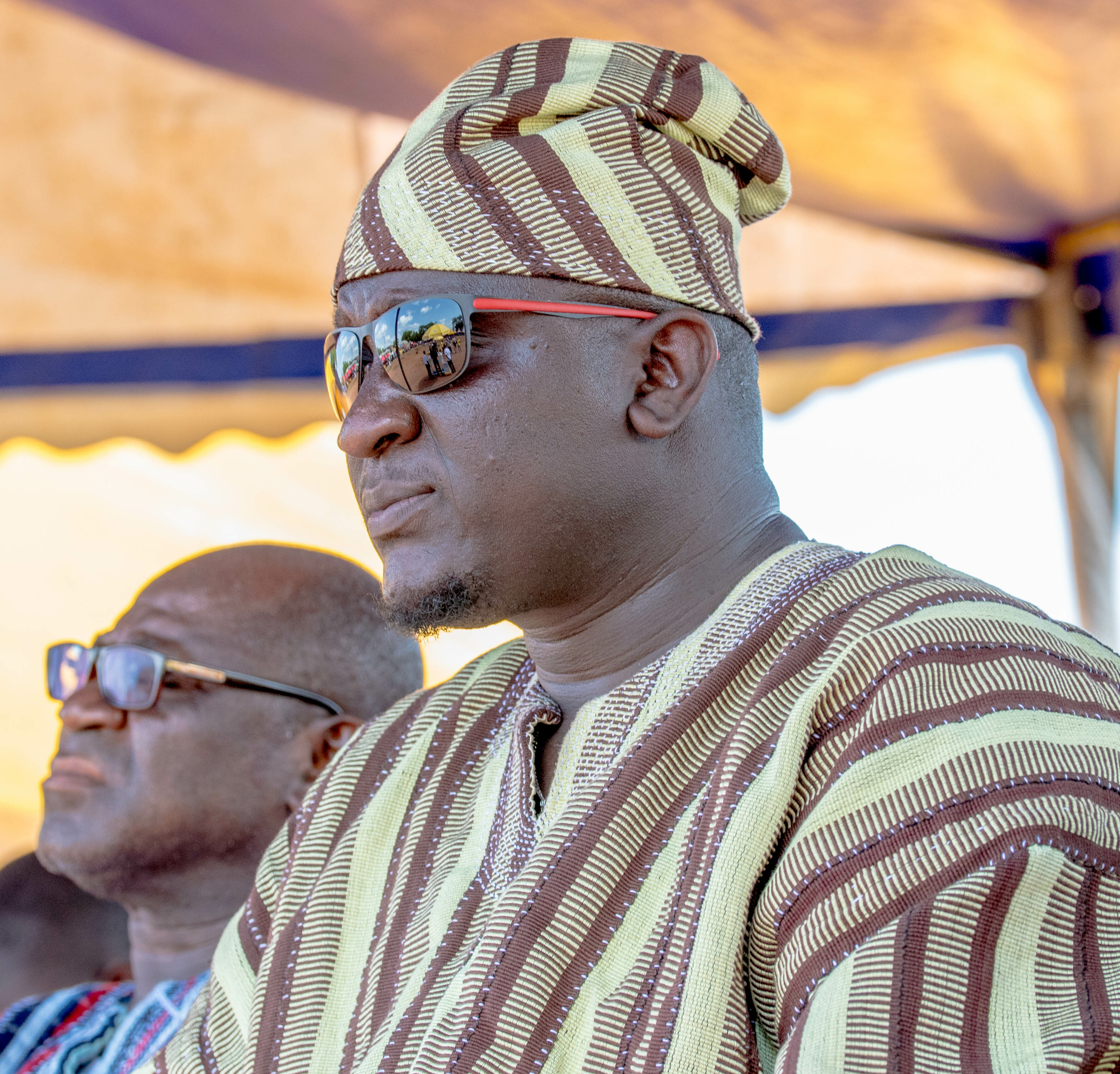
- Anthony Abayifaa Karbo MP for Lawra

Deputy Minister
- Incumbent
- Assumed office March 2017
- President: Nana Akuffo-Addo
- Preceded by: Isaac Agyei Mensah

Member of Parliament for Lawra
- Incumbent
- Assumed office January 2017
- Preceded by: Sampson Abu

National Youth Organizer for New Patriotic Party
- In office February 2010 – August 2012
- Preceded by: John Boadu
- Succeeded by: Sammi Awuku

Personal details
- Born: 12 August 1979 (age 46) Jekarayili, Ghana
- Party: New Patriotic Party
- Spouse: Awenlue Kante-KarboAwenlue Kante Karbo
- Relations: Naa Abeifaa Karbo I (father)
- Children: 3
- Education: University for Development Studies; University of Birmingham
- Occupation: MP
- Profession: Politician
- Committees: Appointments' Committee Communications Committee

Anthony Abayifaa Karbo (born 12 August 1979) is a Ghanaian politician and member of Parliament of the Lawra constituency in the upper west region of Ghana. He is a member of the New Patriotic Party and the deputy minister for Roads and Highways in Ghana.

== Early years ==
Karbo is a member of the Dagaaba ethnic group and hails from Lawra in the Upper West Region of Ghana. He was born in Jekarayili a small town located in Tamale, Ghana's Northern regional capital. A member of the Abayifaa royal family, Karbo was introduced at an early age to political activism. His father, Abeifaa Karbo was a founding member of the Northern People's Party, eventually becoming the first Member of Parliament for the Lawra- Nandom constituency. He was a leading voice during the oppressive reign of Ghana ’s first President Dr. Kwame Nkrumah.

== Education ==
Karbo studied at the University for Development Studies, receiving a bachelor's degree in Integrated Development Studies in 2005. As a student, Karbo distinguished himself as a student leader and rose through the ranks to become the Central Student Representative Council President of the University for Development Studies in 2004. Before then, he was President of TESCON, Navrongo Campus. Karbo also served on the Central Committees of both the National Union of Ghana Students and the University Students Association of Ghana. His performance in these roles earned him an appointment on the Upper West Regional Campaign Team ahead of the NPP 2004 general elections. In 2006, he graduated with a Masters in Economic Policy and International Business from University of Birmingham.

In 2007, at the behest of then flag bearer of the New Patriotic Party, Nana Akufo-Addo Karbo returned to Ghana to pursue active politics.

== Politics ==
=== New Patriotic Party ===
In March 2008, Karbo was appointed a member of the national research team of the New Patriotic Party. He was promoted in December 2008 to be the Campaign Coordinator for the vice presidential candidate of the New Patriotic Party Dr. Mahamudu Bawumia. After the defeat of the Party in the 2008 elections, Karbo returned to the Party ’s office and served as a key member of the Party's communication unit.

In 2010, Karbo was elected National Youth Organizer of the Party. Karbo held this role until 2012 when he resigned to pursue his bid of becoming the Party's Parliamentary candidate for the newly created Lawra Constituency in keeping with the Party's policy. Unsuccessful in his attempt, Karbo returned to serve as a Deputy Communications Director of the New Patriotic Party and Spokesperson for the Vice Presidential Candidate.

=== Member of Parliament ===
Abayifaa Karbo was first elected to the Parliament of Ghana on the ticket of the NPP in December 2016 after defeating the incumbent Sampson Abu and Upper West Regional Minister Bede Ziedeng. Prior to the elections, many had doubted his chances of success since the ruling National Democratic Congress (NDC) had held the seat for eight years.

Few days after his swearing in as MP, it was largely speculated in the Ghanaian media that he was going to be appointed a deputy Minister.

He is contesting in the 2020 Ghanaian general election as the parliamentary candidate for the New Patriotic Party.

=== Deputy Minister ===
In April 2017, Karbo was appointed as Deputy Minister for Roads and Highways. As Deputy Minister, Karbo chaired the working committee on the Sinohydro deal at the Ministry for Road and Highways, the biggest infrastructure barter in the history of Ghana. Karbo has persistently argued for open partnerships as a way of developing Ghana's road infrastructure.

== Personal life and interests ==
Karbo is married to Awenlue Kante-Karbo (née Kante) and has three children. He is a Christian, born and raised a Catholic and is a devout member of the Lawra Parish of the Catholic Church. Besides politics, Karbo actively pursues farming and likes to take advantage of opportunities to engage in communal farming activities with his constituents and thus further consolidating his persona as a grassroots politician. Anthony Karbo is generally viewed as pro-African and pro-poor in his beliefs. While not rejecting foreign cooperation and assistance, Karbo has often called for economic partnerships which directly benefits the ordinary citizens of African States.

Parliament of Ghana
| Preceded by Sampson Abu | Member of Parliament for Lawra; 2017– | Succeeded by incumbent |
Political offices
| Preceded by Isaac Agyei Mensah | Deputy Minister for Roads and Highways (Ghana); 2017– | Succeeded by incumbent |
Party political offices
| Preceded by John Boadu | New Patriotic Party National Youth Organizer for 2012 | Succeeded by Sammi Awuku |
| Preceded by Curtis Perry Kwabla Okudzeto | Deputy Director of Communications for New Patriotic Party; 2014, | Succeeded by Curtis Perry Kwabla Okudzeto |
| Preceded by | Spokesperson for Mahamudu Bawumia; 2016, | Succeeded by Gideo Boako |
