= Benjamin Kunbuor =

Ghanaian politician

Hon. Benjamin Kunbour

Minister for Defence
- In office 16 July 2014 – 9 January 2017
- President: John Dramani Mahama
- Preceded by: Mark Owen Woyongo
- Succeeded by: Dominic Nitiwul

22nd Minister for Justice and Attorney General
- In office 2012–2013
- President: John Atta Mills
- Preceded by: Martin Amidu
- Succeeded by: Marietta Brew Appiah-Oppong

Minister for Interior
- In office 2011–2012
- President: John Atta Mills
- Preceded by: Martin Amidu
- Succeeded by: William Kwasi Aboah

Minister for Health
- In office 2009 – January 2011
- President: John Atta Mills
- Preceded by: George Yankey
- Succeeded by: Joseph Yieleh Chireh

Member of Parliament for Lawra-Nandom Constituency
- In office 7 January 2001 – 6 January 2009
- President: John Kufuor
- Preceded by: Anthony Bondong
- Succeeded by: Ambrose P. Dery

Personal details
- Born: Benjamin Bewa-Nyog Kunbuor; 15 July 1957 (age 68)
- Party: National Democratic Congress
- Spouse: Victoria Kunbour
- Children: 3
- Education: Nandom Senior High School
- Alma mater: University of Ghana; Ghana School of Law; University of Warwick
- Profession: Lawyer

Benjamin Bewa-Nyog Kunbuor is a former Ghanaian Minister for Defence of the Ghanaian Ministry of Defence and a Ghanaian politician. He was the Member of Parliament for the Nandom constituency.

== Education ==
Kunbour had his secondary education at Nandom Secondary School, acquired his LLB from the University of Ghana, and qualified as a lawyer after completing the Ghana School of Law.

He thereafter proceeded to the University of Warwick in the United Kingdom and obtained his LLM with distinction. He was subsequently awarded the British Chevening Scholarship to complete his PhD in Law in Development (1997-2000).

He also obtained the Overseas Students Award (OSSA) Doctoral Award at the University of Warwick.

== Career ==
Kunbour once worked as a graduate teaching assistant at the University of Warwick in the United Kingdom. He has since also lectured at the Ghana School of Law. He has also been a director at the Commission on Human Rights and Administrative Justice in Ghana.

== Politics ==
Kunbour is a member of the National Democratic Congress. He first stood for election in the 2000 parliamentary election and won with a majority of 62.5%. He retained his seat in the following election four years later, but lost it after the 2008 election when his party came back to power. In 2009, George Yankey resigned from the NDC government following a corruption scandal. President Mills appointed Kunbuor as his Minister for Health.

Following a cabinet reshuffle in January 2011, Kunbour was appointed Minister for Interior by President Mills.

Following the resignation of Martin Amidu, Attorney General in January 2012, Mr.Kunbuor was appointed Attorney General by President Mills.

=== 2000 Elections ===
Kunbour was elected as the member of parliament for the Lawra-Nandom constituency in the Upper West region of Ghana in the 2000 Ghanaian general elections. He therefore represented the constituency in the 4th parliament of the 4th republic of Ghana.

He was elected with 22,347 out of the total votes cast. This is equivalent to 74.40% of the total valid votes cast. He was elected over Tenku Charles of the Peoples National Convention, Stephen Yir-Eru Engmen of the New Patriotic Party and David Nandoh of the National Reform Party.

These obtained 2,2347 votes, 3,570 votes, 3,487 votes and 641 votes. These were equivalent to 74.40%, 11.90%, 11.60%, 2.10% respectively of the total valid votes cast. Kunbour was elected on the ticket of the National Democratic Congress. The National Democratic Congress won a total of 7 parliamentary seats in the Upper West Region in that elections.

In all, the party won a minority total of 89 parliamentary representation out of 200 seats in the 3rd parliament of the 4th republic of Ghana.

=== 2004 Elections ===
Kunbuor was elected as the member of parliament for the Lawra-Nandom constituency in the Upper West region of Ghana in the 2004 Ghanaian general elections. He thus represented the constituency in the 4th parliament of the 4th republic of Ghana.

He was elected with 19,306 votes out of 31,138 total valid votes cast. This was equivalent to 62.0% of the total valid votes cast. He was elected over Bapullu Debis Dery of the People's National Convention, Dery Ambrose P of the New Patriotic Party and Seidu Adama Billah of the Convention People's Party.

These obtained 912 votes, 10,549 votes and 371 votes respectively of the total valid votes cast. These were equivalent to 2.9%, 33.9% and 1.2% of the total valid votes cast. Kunbuor was elected on the ticket of the National Democratic Congress.

His constituency was a part of the 7 constituencies won by the National Democratic Congress in the Upper West region in the 2004 Ghanaian general elections. The National Democratic Congress won a minority total of 94 parliamentary representation out of a total 230 seats in the 4th parliament of the 4th republic of Ghana.

== Personal life ==
Kunbuor is married with three children.

== See also ==
- List of Mahama government ministers
- National Democratic Congress (Ghana)

Parliament of Ghana
Preceded by Anthony Bondong	MP for Lawra-Nandom; 2001 – 2009	Succeeded by Ambrose P. Dery
New title	MP for Nandom; 2013 – present	Incumbent
Political offices
Preceded by George Yankey	Minister for Health; 2009 – 2011	Succeeded by Joseph Yieleh Chireh
Preceded by Martin Amidu	Minister for Interior; 2011 – 2012	Succeeded by William Kwasi Aboah
Preceded by Martin Amidu	Minister for Justice and Attorney General; 2012 – 2013	Succeeded by Marietta Brew Appiah-Oppong
Preceded by Mark Owen Woyongo	Minister for Defence; 2014 – 2017	Succeeded by Dominic Nitiwul
