= Fred McBagonluri =

Ghanaian engineer, inventor, novelist, educator and thought leader

- Born: 18 August 1970 (age 55); La Bawaleshie, East Legon District, Ghana
- Education: Massachusetts Institute of Technology (MIT)
- Occupations: Engineer; writer
- Children: Putiaha; Puyen; Zelba
- Parents: David Mac-Bagonluri; Patience Mensah

Fred McBagonluri (born 18 August 1970) is a Ghanaian engineer, inventor, novelist, educator and thought leader, who is currently Provost and President at Academic City University. He was previously the founding Dean at the Faculty of Engineering at Ashesi University. He was also the founding executive director of the Ghana Climate Innovation Center, a new cleantech incubator backed by the World Bank. Prior to his role at Ashesi University, Prof. McBagonluri lived and worked in the United States. He was the Vice President of the New Product Development Joerns Healthcare in Arlington, Texas. He has held various roles in engineering, strategy, marketing, and research, and has worked with numerous Institutions in the US, including Princeton University, where he was a visiting research associate, working for Prof. Wole Soboyejo (distinguished Dean of Engineering, Worcester Polytechnic Institute, MA), Siemens Healthcare, and Becton and Dickinson and Co. He holds a Bachelor of Science degree (Summa Cum Laude) in Manufacturing Engineering from Central State University, with a minor in Applied Math, a Master of Science in Engineering Science and Mechanics from Virginia Tech and a Doctorate in Materials Engineering from the University of Dayton. He also holds a Masters of business administration degree from the Massachusetts Institute of Technology (MIT). McBagonluri was the Black Engineer of the year's most promising scientist in 2008 and was the 2009 finalist of the NASA Astronaut Candidate Corps (ASCAN). In 2008, he won the New Jersey State Healthcare Business (NJBiz) Innovator Hero Award. He made incredible contributions to the development of Computer Aided Process Architecture and automation. As a former director of R&D, McBagonluri made contributions in the areas of computer-aided design, artificial intelligence, 3D data processing and advanced hearing systems. McBagonluri has over forty patents and patents application in his name. He has authored nine books including three novels. He is a member of the American Society of Mechanical Engineers, Society of Manufacturing Engineers, and an MIT Alfred P. Sloan Fellow.

== Early life and education ==
Fred McBagonluri was born on 18 August 1970, at La Bawaleshie, East Legon in Ghana. He was the second of three sons born to David Mac-Bagonluri and Patience Mensah, and raised by his grandmother who never had any formal education. McBagonluri began his primary school at the University Staff Village, near University Hospital, Legon. He later attended St. Louis Preparatory near Wa. He proceeded to Nandom Senior High School (formerly Nandom Secondary school) where he obtained distinction at the Ordinary Level Certificate Examination (O level). He later went to St. Augustine's College in the Central region of Ghana for his advanced level education but shortly proceeded to Central State University, where he graduated with a Bachelor of Science (summa cum laude) in Manufacturing Engineering. He obtained Masters in Engineering Mechanics from Virginia Tech. He holds an MBA from the Massachusetts Institute of Technology, and a Ph.D. from the University of Dayton, where he studied Material Engineering. He has also successfully completed the Advanced Management Course and Mentoring Programs at Siemens and Advanced Leadership Development Program from BD University.

== Work ==
McBagonluri is currently the President and Provost at Academic City University. Prior to his current role, McBagonluri lived and worked in the United States of America. He was the Vice President of the New Product Development at Joerns Healthcare in Arlington, Texas. He was the Worldwide Director of R&D/Hypodermic Injection Systems ($700–800M) and subsequently Director of Market Development at Becton Dickinson and Co (BD Medical), a Fortune 500 Company located in Franklin Lakes, New Jersey. McBagonluri has held various roles in Engineering, Strategy, Marketing, and Research, and has worked with numerous Institutions in the US, including Princeton University and Siemens HealthCare. McBagonluri is not only a Scientist but a writer, a poet, and a novelist. He has many poems and has written about nine books including more than three novels. His most recent books have been: "Harvest of Jenes", "Ultimate Surrender", "When Tears Stand Still", "A women to Marry", and "Dusk Recitals". He also writes in technical journals, conference proceedings, and book chapters.

== Achievements ==
McBagonluri won 2008 Black Engineering of the year's Most promising scientist. He was a finalist of the 2009 NASA astronauts Candidate Corps, a feat which nearly saw him land into space as the first African. He won the New Jersey State Healthcare Business (NJBiz) Innovator Hero Award in 2008. His incredible contributions to the development of Computer Aided Process Architecture and automation as the former director of R&D made an impact on the company's over 40 U.S./European/World patents and patent applications in the areas of Computer aided design, artificial intelligence, 3D processing and advanced hearing systems. He is Co-Inventor on 22 issued US Patents. His massive contribution to engineering was recognized throughout the United States of America. McBagonluri has over forty patents and patents application in his name. He is a member of the American Society of Mechanical Engineers, Society of Manufacturing Engineers, and an MIT Alfred P. Sloan Fellow.
