= Lawra-Nandom (Ghana parliament constituency) =

Constituency in Ghana

- constituency for the Parliament of Ghana
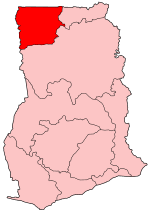
- District: Lawra District
- Region: Upper West Region of Ghana

Current constituency
- Party: New Patriotic Party
- MP: Ambrose P. Dery

Lawra-Nandom is one of the constituencies represented in the Parliament of Ghana. It elects one Member of Parliament (MP) by the first past the post system of election. Lawra-Nandom is located in the Lawra district of the Upper West Region of Ghana.

== Boundaries ==
The seat is located within the Lawra District of the Upper West Region of Ghana.

== Members of Parliament ==
Election	Member	Party
1954	Abeifaa Karbo	Northern People's Party; United Party
1965	William Gangmir Wononuo (Lawra)	Convention People's Party
1966 to 1969: Military rule
1969	Sylvester Emmanuel Sanziri	Progress Party
1979	Gandaa Naabomo (Lawra)	People's National Party
1982 to 1992: Military rule
1992	Ken Meyir Kunfah	National Democratic Congress
1996	Anthony Bondong	National Democratic Congress
2000	Benjamin Kunbuor	National Democratic Congress
2008	Ambrose Dery	New Patriotic Party
2012 - Split into Lawra and Nandom constituencies

Election	Member	Party	Number of terms
2012	Samson Abu	National Democratic Congress (Ghana)	1
2016	Anthony N-yoh Abayifaa Karbo	New Patriotic Party	1

== Elections ==
2008 Ghanaian parliamentary election: Lawra-Nandom Source:Ghana Home Page
Party	Candidate	Votes	%	±%
New Patriotic Party	Ambrose P. Dery	16556	47.6	13.7
National Democratic Congress	Benjamin Bewa-Nyog Kunbuor	15,016	43.2	−18.8
Democratic Freedom Party	Bede Ziedeng	1,492	4.3	—
Democratic People's Party	Ngmenkye C.Yelvele	774	2.2	—
People's National Convention	Fatchu Henry	636	1.8	−1.1
Convention People's Party	Dabuo Wilson	310	0.9	−0.3
Majority		1,540	4.4	—
Turnout		—	—	—

2004 Ghanaian parliamentary election: Lawra-Nandom Source:Electoral Commission of Ghana & Friedrich Ebert Foundation
Party	Candidate	Votes	%	±%
National Democratic Congress	Benjamin Bewa-Nyog Kunbuor	19,306	62.0	12.4
New Patriotic Party	Ambrose P. Dery	10,549	33.9	22.3
People's National Convention	Bapullu Denis Dery	912	2.9	−9.0
Convention People's Party	Seidu Adams Billah	371	1.2	—
Majority		8,757	28.1	—
Turnout		33,288	82.4	—

2000 Ghanaian parliamentary election: Lawra-Nandom Source:Adam Carr's Election Archives
Party	Candidate	Votes	%	±%
National Democratic Congress	Benjamin Bewa-Nyog Kunbuor	22,347	74.4	6.6
People's National Convention	Tenku Charles	3,570	11.9	−13.7
New Patriotic Party	Stephen Yir-Eru Engmen	3,487	11.6	5.0
National Reform Party	David Nandoh	641	2.1	—
Majority		18,777	62.5	—
Turnout		—	—	—

1996 Ghanaian parliamentary election: Lawra-Nandom Source:Electoral Commission of Ghana
Party	Candidate	Votes	%	±%
National Democratic Congress	Anthony Koyiri Bondong	22,441	67.8	—
People's National Convention	Edward Nminyuor Gyader	8,486	25.6	—
New Patriotic Party	Naapie Guomil	2,192	6.6	—
National Convention Party	Ismael Pegkuu Karbo	0.0	0.0	—
Majority		13,955	42.2	—
Turnout		34,885	67.1	42.1

1992 Ghanaian parliamentary election: Lawra-Nandom Source:Electoral Commission of Ghana
Party	Candidate	Votes	%	±%
National Democratic Congress	Ken Meyir Kunfah	—	—	—
Majority		—	—	—
Turnout		13,412	25.0	—

== See also ==
- List of Ghana Parliament constituencies
- Lawra (Ghana parliament constituency)
- Nandom (Ghana parliament constituency)
