= Ken Meyir Kunfah =

Ghanaian politician

Member of Parliament for Lawra-Nandom
- In office 7 January 1993 – 6 January 1997
- President: Jerry John Rawlings
- Preceded by: Gandaa Naabomo
- Succeeded by: Anthony Koyiri Bondong

Personal details
- Born: 24 December 1952 (age 73) Nandom, Upper West Region, Gold Coast (now Ghana)
- Party: National Democratic Congress
- Education: College of Insurance and Risk Management, Monrovia
- Occupation: Politician
- Profession: Insurance manager

Ken Meyir Kunfah (born 24 December 1952) is a Ghanaian politician and a member of the First Parliament of the Fourth Republic representing the Lawra-Nandom constituency in the Upper West Region of Ghana.

== Early life and education ==
Kunfah was born on 24 December 1952 at Nandom in the Upper West Region of Ghana. He attended the College of Insurance and Risk Management, Monrovia, where he obtained his Diploma in Insurance.

== Politics ==
He was first elected into parliament on the ticket of the National Democratic Congress to represent the Lawra-Nandom constituency in the Upper West Region of Ghana during the 1992 Ghanaian parliamentary election. In 1996, he was succeeded by Anthony Bondong. Bondong, during the 1996 Ghanaian general elections, polled 22,441 votes out of the total valid votes cast against his opponents Gyader Edward Nminyuor of the People's National Convention who polled 8,486 votes and Naapie Guomil of the New Patriotic Party who polled 2,192 votes.

== Career ==
Kunfah is an Insurance Manager.

== Personal life ==
Kunfah is a Christian.
