= Karbo =

Karbo is a surname. Notable people with the surname include:

- Abeifaa Karbo, Ghanaian politician
- Anthony Karbo (born 1979), Ghanaian politician
- Karen Karbo (born 1956), American author and journalist
- Wally Karbo (1915–1993), American professional wrestling promoter
