= Judith Adem Owigar =

Kenyan tech entrepreneur and activist

Judith Owigar
- Born: 1985 (age 40–41); Kenya
- Other name: Adem
- Citizenship: Kenyan
- Education: University of Nairobi (BSc) 2008; University of Nairobi (MSc) 2016
- Occupations: techpreneur; activist
- Known for: Co-founder of AkiraChix
- Awards: Change agent ABIE Award (2011); Focus Fellow (2014); Acumen Fellow (2015)
- Website: URL|https://www.judithowigar.com/

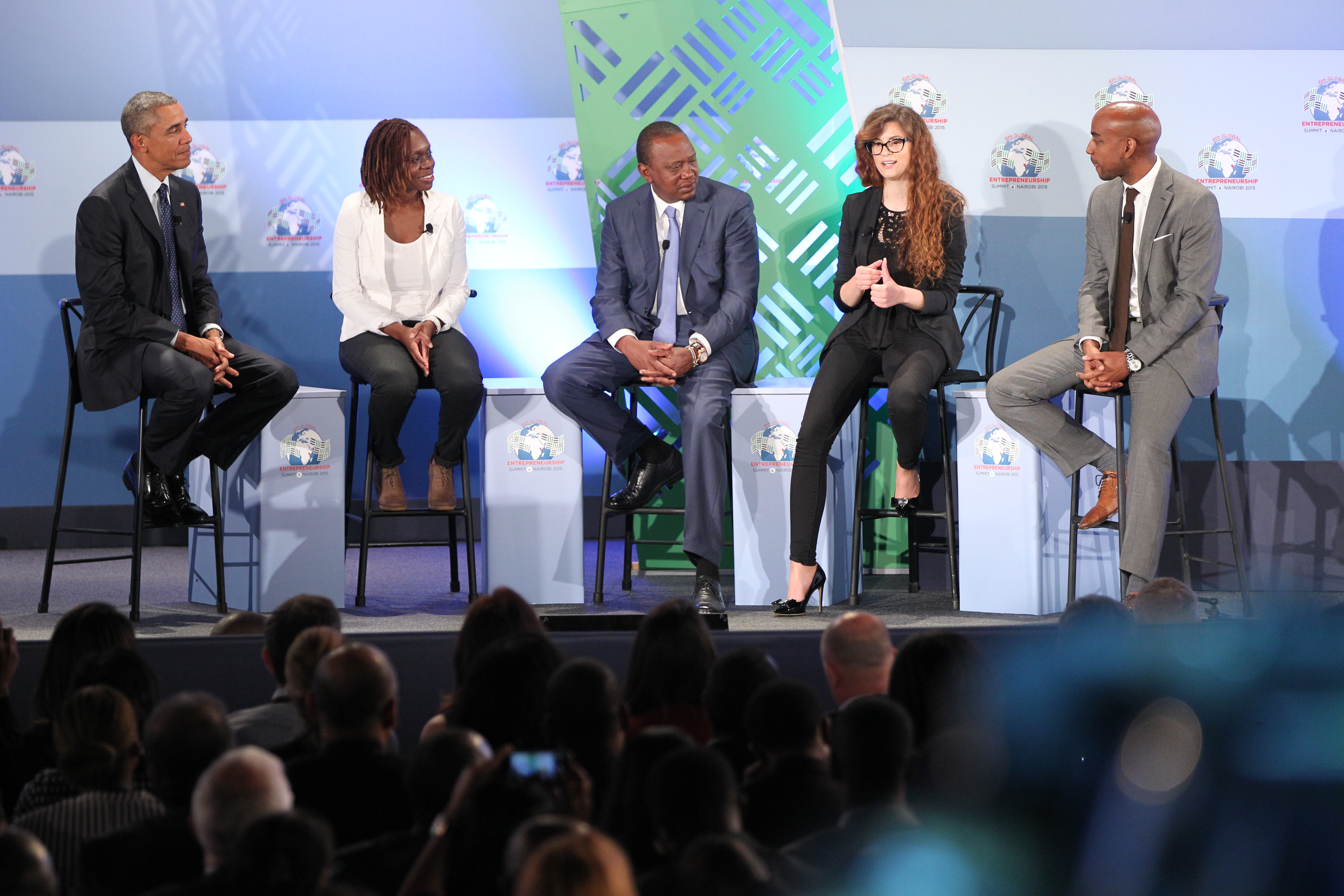
President Obama Joins Interactive Conversation with Entrepreneurs (19993083225)

Judith Adem Owigar (born 1985) is a Kenyan tech entrepreneur and activist, known for promoting gender diversity in the African technology sector. She is also the co-founder and president of AkiraChix, an organization aimed at empowering women through technology and founder of JuaKali Workforce, a platform that connects youth to short term jobs in Kenya's informal sector. In addition, Owigar works with UN-Habitat as a consultant on major issues.

== Early life ==
=== Educational background ===
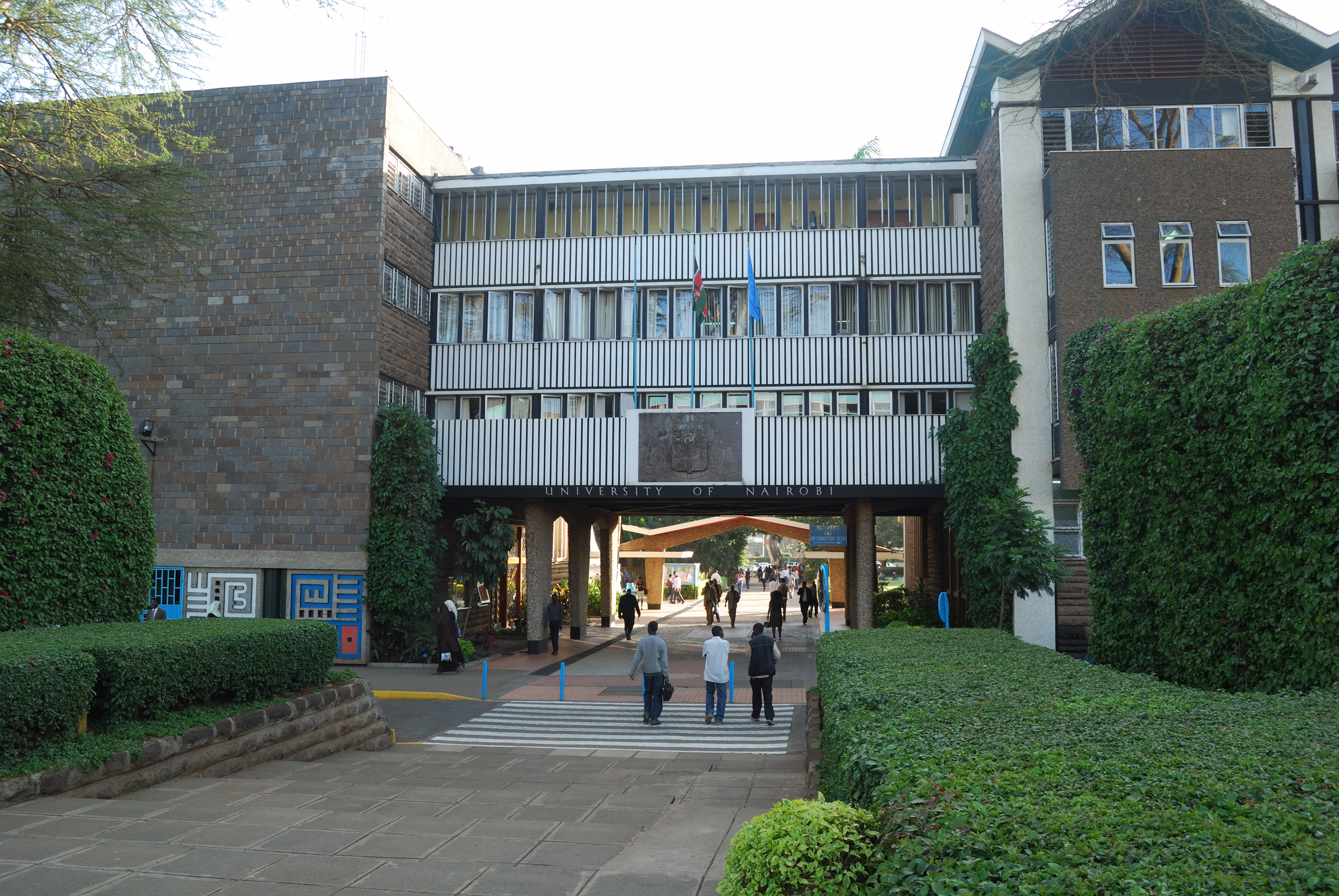
University of Nairobi, Kenya

Owigar was born and raised in Kenya. She developed an interest in technology and engineering at a young age and pursued computer science at the university level. Later Judith earned a Bachelor of Science degree in computer science from the University of Nairobi in 2008. She later pursued a Master of Science in Applied Computing, also from the University of Nairobi, in 2016.

== Career ==
Judith began her career as a tech support specialist at Turnkey Africa. In 2008, she transitioned to Ibid Labs as a developer. From 2009 to 2012 Judith worked at the Japanmn Center for Conflict Prevention, where she played a key role in developing databases and web applications used for the project Somalia and the Great Lakes region. By 2012, she founded Juakali, a platform designed to link skilled workers in Kenya's informal sector with employment opportunities in construction and other industries. In 2016, she served as an ICT advisor for the Urban Basic Services Branch of the United Nations Human Settlements Programme (UN-Habitat). Judith has held board positions with several organizations, including the Swedish Program for ICT in Developing Regions (SPIDER), Lumen Labs, and the Africa WeTech Leadership Council. She currently works as Smart and Electric Mobility Consultant for UN-Habitat where she tackles issues regarding climate change, rapid urgbanization, and the integration of technology into sustainable development.

=== AkiraChix ===
In 2010, Judith alongside Angela Lungati, Linda Kamau, and Marie Githinji co-founded AkiraChix--a non-profit organisation aimed at increasing women's representation in technology. As the operations director, she led the organization's first research on Kenyan girls' & Women's attitudes towards technology and designed AkiraChix's mentorship program, which paired mentors with participants in the organization's training programs. Judith's inspirations for starting AkiraChix was influenced by global figuresl like former Yahoo CEO Marissa Mayer, and soon local pioneers like Juliana Rotich.

==== codeHive ====
CodeHive is a one-year residential program created by AkiraChix for young, motivated women between the ages of 18 and 24 years who come from under-resourced communities. This program includes full financial assistance, an opportunity at an internship, along with preparing recipients for technology-based employment and leadership roles. There are many requirements applicants must meet to be accepted into the program.

==== Funding and Partnerships ====
Judith secured over $800,000 in grant funding and developed partnerships between AkiraChix and funding organizations such as InfoDev, GitLab Foundation, the US Embassy in Kenya, Safaricom, and the Swedish International Development Cooperation Agency (SIDA).

GitLab Foundation

The GitLab Foundation lists AkiraChix as a grantee for their Powering Economic Opportunity program, with $125,000 awarded to support their codeHive program. The funding is intended for expanding on-the-job training and increasing access for young women to find employment after graduation.

InfoDev

On May 1, 2011, InfoDev, a global innovation program of the World Bank, awarded a grant to AkiraChix. Their total amount of funding was summed up to $53,000, with approximately $41,000 being for technical assistance. A part of this grant agreement was to promote collaboration and innovation in the mobile sphere, along with strengthening the organization’s operations and training initiatives.

Patrick J McGovern Foundation

In 2022, the Patrick J McGovern Foundation awarded a grant to AkiraChix to support its mission of strengthening technology education and increasing workforce development from K-12 through secondary education. The foundation awarded a sum of $150,000 to AkiraChix to help continue and advance their technology training and mentorship to young women from Africa.

Steele Foundation for Hope

The Steele Foundation for Hope's main mission is to provide access to resources and education for people in need worldwide through advances in technology and engineering. In 2023, the foundation delivered an investment of $1 million to AkiraChix to help expand its program to more students across Africa.

==== Challenges ====
Despite support from organizations, AkiraChix faced challenges. According to InfoDev, major challenges that AkiraChix faced were surrounding limited administrative resources compared to growing requirements and the necessary roles and resources AkiraChix needed. Owigar acknowledges that there was an initial pressure to prove herself among male innovators but notes positive changes over time.

== Awards and recognition ==
Judith has been a keynote speaker at the Grace Hopper Celebration of Women in Computing and the Global Entrepreneurship Summit, where she shared the stage with former US president Barack Obama and former Kenyan president, Uhuru Kenyatta. In 2014 Forbes named her one of Africa's '10 Female Tech Founders to Watch.

She has been recognized with several awards, including:

- CNN’s 10 African Voices to Follow on Twitter
- East Africa Acumen Fellow – 2015.
- Change Agent ABIE Award.
- Focus Fellow – 2014.
- Top 40 Under 40 Women in Kenya.
- Seacom's women in tech sector.
