= Kajsa Hallberg Adu =

Swedish academic lecturer

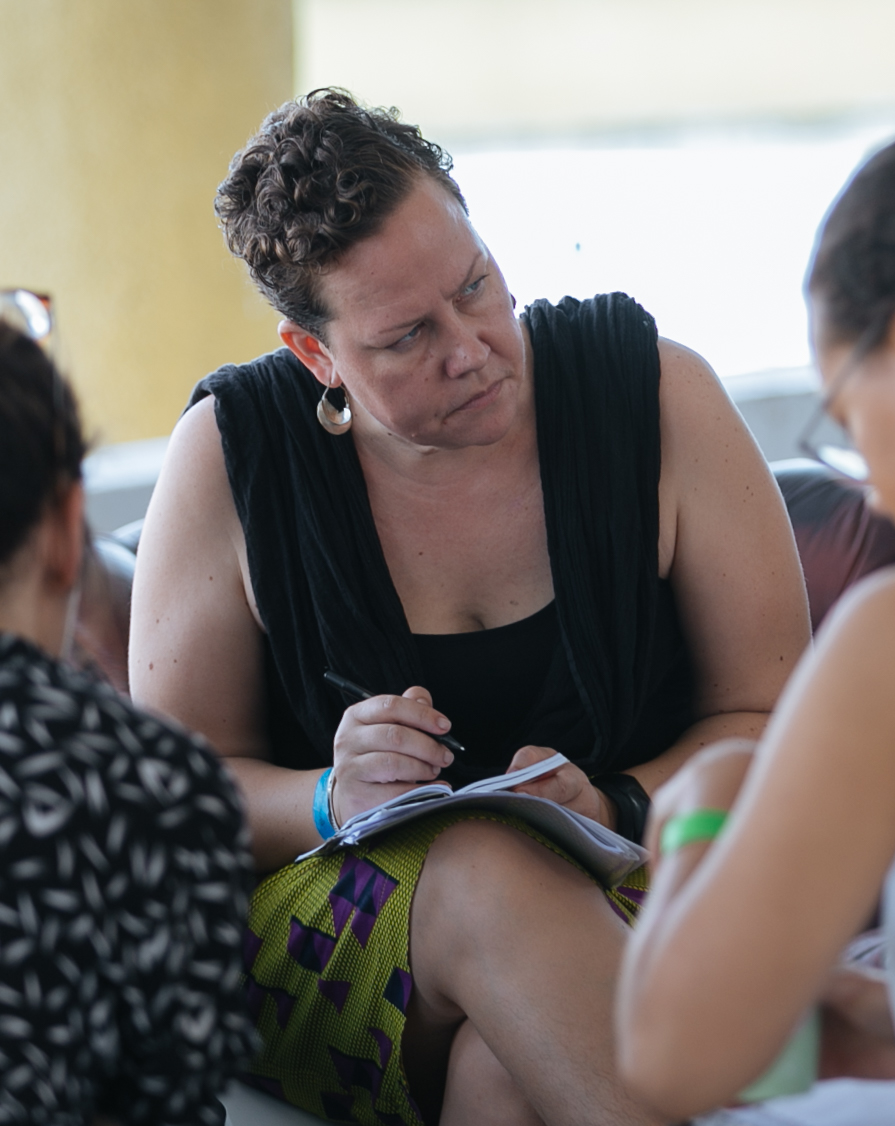
- Born: 7 February 1981 (age 45); Umeå Sweden
- Education: Uppsala University
- Occupation: Lecturer
- Known for: Blogging
- Website: https://kajsaha.com/

Kajsa Hallberg Adu (born 7 February 1981) is a Swedish academic lecturer at Ashesi University, blogger and founder of Blogging Ghana.

== Early life ==
Kajsa was born in Umeå, Sweden.

== Education ==
Kajsa had her Masters in Political Studies from Uppsala University. She also holds a PhD in African Studies from the University of Ghana.

Kajsa teaches Social Theory, Written and Oral Communication and Leadership under the department of Humanities and Social Sciences at Ashesi University since 2009.

She co-founded a blog named "Blogging Ghana" because of her enthusiasm for social media.

== Awards and recognition ==
- The Hewlett Foundation Research Award Regional Institute for Population Studies (RIPS) at the University of Ghana in November 2014.
- Agneta and Gunnar Nilsson's Scholarship for Intercultural Studies (SWEA) 2007
- Georgia Rotary Student Program 2001

== Affiliations ==
- African Studies Association (ASA)
- African Studies Association of Africa (ASAA)
- Ghana Studies Association (GSA)

== Publications ==
- Hallberg Adu, K. (2017, June 2). A rough but rewarding road to educating ethical leaders.
- Hallberg Adu, K. (2016, May 29). Das andere Afrika: Hauptfach: Ethik. Neue Zürcher Zeitung.
- Hallberg Adu, K. (2016, April). The Public-Private Divide in Higher Education. APSA Africa Workshop Alumni E-Newsletter, 3(2), 8–11.
- cihablog. (2015, September 25). In the News: A Deeper Understanding of African Migrants.
- Hallberg Adu, K. (2015, July). On a Course to Migrate? Migration Aspirations among University Students in Ghana (Thesis). University of Ghana.
- Hallberg Adu, K. (2014). Nigeria's Nonviolent Protest Movements Gathering Momentum. Emergence Magazine.
- Hallberg Adu, K. (2014b). What is the opposite of a knowledge society? A critical reflection from Ghana. In L. Amoah (Ed.), Impacts of the Knowledge Society on Economic and Social Growth in Africa. IGI Global
- Öberg, P.O. and Hallberg Adu, K. 2009. "The Deceptive Juncture: The Temptation of Attractive Explanations and the Reality of Political Life" in Magnusson & Ottosson (eds.) The Evolution of Path Dependence. Cheltenham: Edward Elgar.
- Hallberg Adu, K. (2009). Private Higher Education on the Rise. University World News.

== See also ==
- Notable former and current administrators of Ashesi University
