= Nandom Senior High School =

Second cycle co-educational institution in the Upper West region of Ghana

The Nandom Senior High is a Catholic secondary school for boys, located in Nandom, in the Nandom district of the Upper West Region in Ghana. It was formerly called St. Michael's Secondary School.

== History ==
The school was founded in 1968 by the Friars of Immaculate conception (FIC) brothers, with an initial number of 38 students. This has risen to 858 recently.

== Headmasters ==
- Rev. Bro. Albert Ketelaars
- Rev. Bro. Nicholas Zumana
- Guo Kilian Popyin
- Rev. Bro. Joachim Naah
- Rev. Bro. Godwin Saabekone Kuu-Ireme since 24th September 2025.

== Notable alumni ==
- Ahmed Bening, deputy secretary-general of the Panafrican Youth Union
- Emmanuel Bombande, chairperson on The Truth, Justice and Reconciliation Commission of Kenya
- Benjamin Kunbuor, Ghanaian politician
- D.D. Kuupole, vice chancellor of the University of Cape Coast
- Fred McBagonluri, president of Academic City University
- Justice Gabriel Pwamang, Supreme Court judge
- Amin Amidu Sulemana, Ghanaian diplomat and politician
- Joseph Whittal, commissioner of the Commission on Human Rights and Administrative Justice
