= Sylvester Emmanuel Sanziri =

Ghanaian politician (born 1930)

Hon. Sylvester Emmanuel Sanziri

Member of Parliament for Lawra-Nandom constituency
- In office 1 October 1969 – 13 January 1972

Personal details
- Born: 1930
- Party: Progress Party
- Education: Tamale Government Training College
- Occupation: Politician
- Profession: Teacher

Sylvester Emmanuel Sanziri (born 1930) is a Ghanaian politician and member of the first parliament of the second republic of Ghana representing Lawra-Nandom constituency in the Upper Region of Ghana under the membership of the Progress Party (PP)

== Early life and education ==
Sylvester Emmanuel Sanziri was born on 1930. He attended Tamale Government Training College. where he obtained a Teachers' Training Certificate and later worked as a Teacher before going into Parliament.

== Personal life ==
Sanziri is a Catholic, and worked as a teacher.

== Politics ==
Sanziri began his political career in 1969 as a parliamentary candidate for the constituency of Lawra-Nandom in the Upper Region of Ghana prior to the commencement of the 1969 Ghanaian parliamentary election.

He was sworn into the First Parliament of the Second Republic of Ghana on 1 October 1969, after being pronounced winner at the 1969 Ghanaian election held on 26 August 1969. and his tenure of office ended on 13 January 1972.
