= Blogging Ghana =

- Abbreviation: BloGh
- Founder: Kajsa Hallberg Adu
- Type: Non-profit
- Affiliations: Ghana Decides
- Website: www.bloggingghana.org

Blogging Ghana is a non profit organisation of bloggers, online activists and social media users sharing Ghanaian experience. They are the organisers of blogging and social media awards in Ghana. The group is also behind Ghana Decides, a nonpartisan elections project which supports inclusiveness and issue-based elections in Ghana and has promoted the penetration of social media among traditional media organisations, government institutions and civil society groups including the Electoral Commission.
