= Jekarayili =

Jekarayili is a community in Tamale Metropolitan District in the Northern Region of Ghana.

== See also ==
- Datooyili
