= Ghana Climate Innovation Centre =

Climate development programme

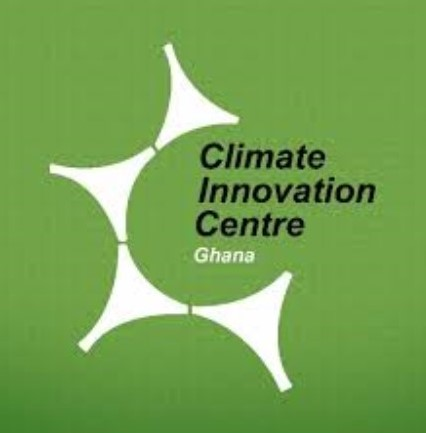
- Founded: 2016; 9 years ago
- Headquarters: Accra, Ghana
- Website: www.ghanacic.org

The Ghana Climate Innovation Centre (GCIC) is a World Bank InfoDev Climate development program center that provides support to small and medium enterprises and startups in developing business concepts that are profitable and can help solve climate change mitigation and adaptation in Ghana.

== Establishment and team ==
The centre was established in 2016 and is located in Accra. It was started up with funding from the Governments of Denmark and the Netherlands through the World Bank's Climate Technology Program.

The centre is managed by a consortium that includes: Ashesi University College, Ernst & Young, SNV Ghana, and the United Nations University, Institute for Natural Resources in Africa. Each member of the group plays different roles in the overall success of the project.

Ashesi University College provides entrepreneurship and venture acceleration. Ernst & Young (EY) provides access to finance, and SNV Ghana and United Nations University Institute for Natural Resources in Africa provide technology and product development, market growth and access, as well as policy and regulation support respectively.

== Services and initiatives ==
Their services are targeted to businesses that are into; energy efficiency & renewable energy, solar power, climate smart agriculture, domestic waste management, water management and purification. Their services include :

- Provision of premium business advisory and business mentoring service
- Technical support in the development
- Prototyping and testing of their innovation,
- Financial Proof of Concept grant.

The Executive Director of the centre is Madam Ruka Sanusi.
