= Gabriel Pwamang =

Ghanaian judge

Justice Gabriel Scott Pwamang

Justice of the Supreme Court of Ghana
- Incumbent
- Assumed office June 2015
- Appointed by: John Mahama

Personal details
- Born: 17 August 1960 (age 66) Ghana
- Education: Nandom Senior High School; University of Ghana
- Profession: Judge

Gabriel Scott Pwamang is an active justice of the Supreme Court of Ghana. He was nominated in 2015 by president of Ghana John Mahama. Prior to his appointment to the bench, he was a private legal practitioner and the managing partner of Pwamang and Associates. He was a member of the People's National Convention once serving as the party's general secretary.

Pwamang was nominated by president of Ghana John Mahama based on the recommendation of the Judicial Council of Ghana. His appointment was delayed as the council of the Ghana Bar Association filed a suit to seek clarification on the appointments as other recommended judges were not appointed by the president. The process was further protracted when a member of the General Legal Council lodged a complaint against him challenging his appointment. The complaint was later withdrawn and Pwamang was sworn into office on 29 June 2015.

== Early life and education ==
Pwamang was born on 17 August 1960. He had his secondary education at Nandom Senior High School graduating in 1982. He proceeded to the University of Ghana for his undergraduate studies graduating in 1986. He was called to the bar in 1988.

== Career ==
=== Law ===
Prior to his appointment to the superior court of judicature, he had been into private legal practice for about 26 years. While in private practice, his areas of expertise included: Land and Natural Resources Law, Human Rights and Criminal Justice. In the business circles, he had served on the board of a number of business corporations. He chaired the board of the Centre for Public Interest Law (CEPIL), an organisation whose interests are in public interest legal issues and the litigation of these issues for communities and associations.

He founded his own law firm, Pwamang and Associates, where he served as a legal consultant for various corporations and organisations. He was the managing partner of the firm until his Supreme Court appointment in 2015.

Pwamang served as a Commissioner on the Constitution Review Commission of Ghana from January 2010 to December 2011. The commission held consultations throughout the nation on the 1992 constitution and subsequently submitted a report which included recommendations for amendments to the constitution. He was also part of the drafting committee of the Constitution Review Commission that drafted the proposed amendment bills.

=== Politics ===
Pwamang was a member of the People's National Convention. Between 1998 and 2007 he served as the deputy general secretary, and later general secretary, of the party (PNC).

He contested the Navrongo Central seat in 2004 and 2008 on the ticket of the People's National Convention but lost on both occasions to Joseph Kofi Adda of the New Patriotic Party. In 2012 he contested once more for the seat and lost this time to Mark Woyongo of the National Democratic Congress.

== Appointment ==
After the nomination of Justice Pwamang and Justice Yaw Appau, the national council of the Ghana Bar Association together with three lawyers filed a suit at the Supreme Court seeking clarification on a provision in the constitution concerning the appointment of judges to the Superior Courts. This action was taken based on the fact that the council recommended three persons for appointment to the Supreme Court however, one was left out. Also, seven justices were recommended for to serve on the Appeals Court however, the president appointed five out of the seven. There were claims that the association's intention was to nullify the appointments, however, the association denied these claims citing that, the appointment authority may have violated Article 144 clause 2 which states that,

"The other Supreme Court Justices shall be appointed by the President acting on the advice of the Judicial Council, in consultation with the Council of State and with the approval of Parliament."

The Spokesperson for the Ghana Bar Association, Tony Forson further added that their action is

"not retrospective but prospective. We are not quibbling with the current appointment, we are asking for a declaration by the Supreme Court that any appointment, going forward, which does not conform to, 'on the advice of' as declared by the Supreme Court will be null and void."

Justice Pwamang was vetted on 3 June 2015 and approved by parliament but his appointment was challenged by madam Eva Oboshie Sai of the General Legal Council. The appointment process was consequently protracted as the then Chief Justice, Georgina Theodora Woode formed a Disciplinary Committee to investigate the matter. The committee later cleared him as it established that the complaint against him (Justice Pwamang) had been withdrawn by the complainant. He was subsequently sworn into office together with Yaw Appau on Monday, 29 June 2015.

== See also ==
- List of judges of the Supreme Court of Ghana
- Supreme Court of Ghana
