= Patrick Awuah Jr. =

Ghanaian engineer and educator; founder and president of Ashesi University

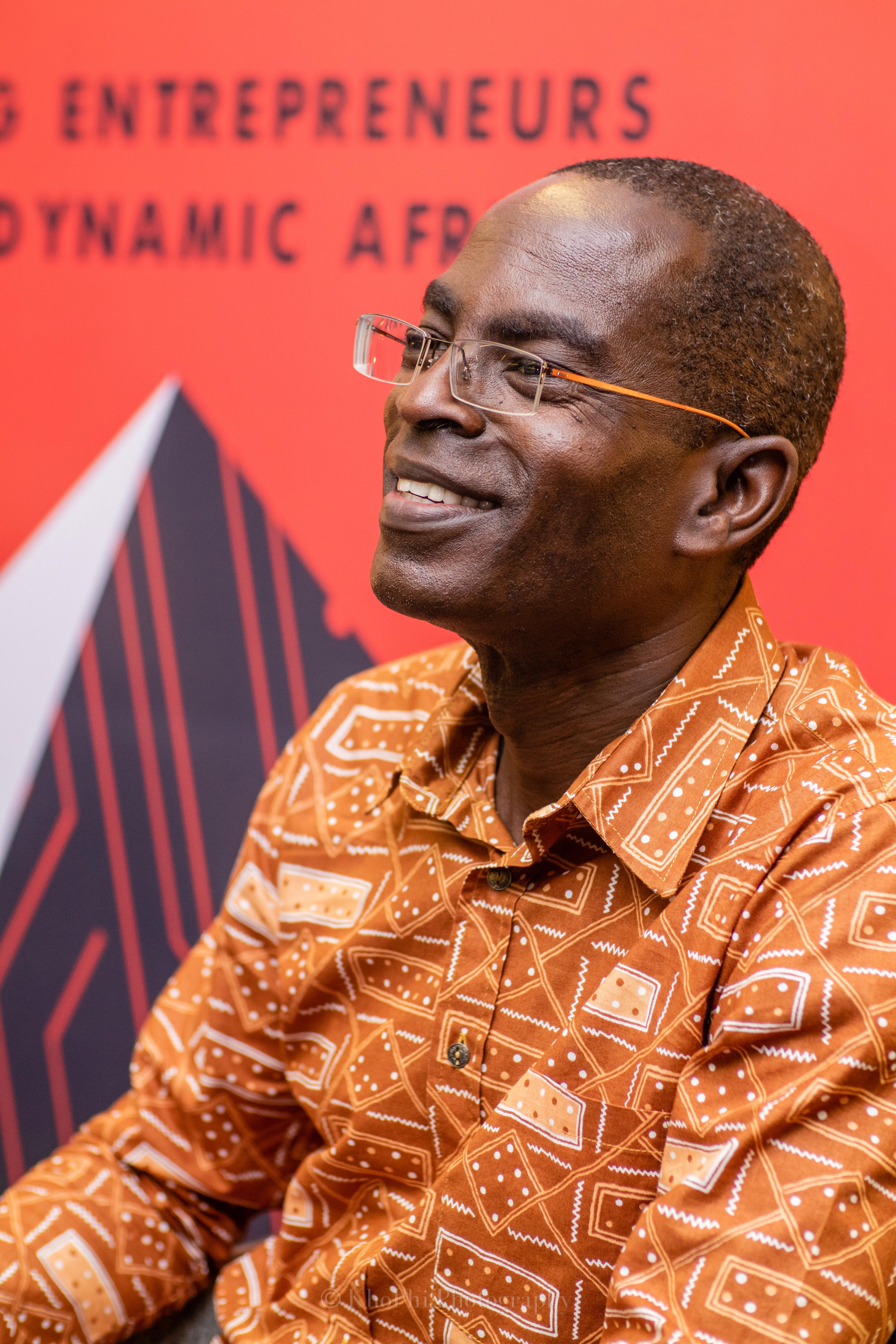
- Born: 1965 (age 60–61)
- Education: Achimota School; UC Berkeley, Swarthmore College
- Known for: Ashesi University
- Spouse: Rebecca Awuah
- Awards: John P. McNulty Prize; MacArthur Fellowship

Patrick Awuah Jr. (born 1965) is a Ghanaian engineer, educator, and entrepreneur. Awuah established Ashesi University, a private, not-for-profit Ghanaian institution in 2002. He has received awards as an individual and as the founder of Ashesi.

== Life ==
Awuah grew up in Accra, Ghana. He attended the Achimota School where he was a house prefect.

He moved to the U.S. in 1985 to attend Swarthmore College with a full scholarship. He earned bachelor's degrees in Engineering and Economics, graduating in 1989. Following graduation, Awuah worked as a software engineer and program manager for Microsoft from 1989 to 1997. At Microsoft, he met his future wife, Rebecca, a software testing engineer.

In 1997, Awuah left Microsoft with the goal of returning to Ghana to educate the next generation of African leaders. He enrolled at the Haas School of Business at UC Berkeley, focusing his work on preparing a business plan for Ashesi. Awuah, Nina Marini, and other graduate students from Berkeley went to Ghana to do a feasibility study for opening a private university there. Awuah graduated with his MBA in 1999. That same year, he moved back to Ghana with his family to found Ashesi University. Awuah continues to serve as the president of Ashesi University.

== Achievements and awards ==
John Kufuor presented Awuah the Order of the Volta Award to recognise his contribution to tertiary education in Ghana in 2007. In 2009, Awuah won the John P. McNulty Prize. In 2010, Awuah was awarded 87th most creative business person by Fast Company. In 2014, he received The Elise and Walter A. Haas International Award, which honours UC Berkeley alumni with distinguished records of service to their native country. In the same year he was named best social entrepreneur by the Schwab Foundation for Social Entrepreneurship. In 2015, Awuah was listed by Fortune as number 40 in world's 50 greatest leaders and was awarded a MacArthur Fellowship. In 2017, Awuah was awarded the World Innovation Summit for Education (WISE) prize, a major global education award.

== See also ==
- List of Ghanaians- Academia and educators
