= Ahmed Bening =

Ghanaian social entrepreneur

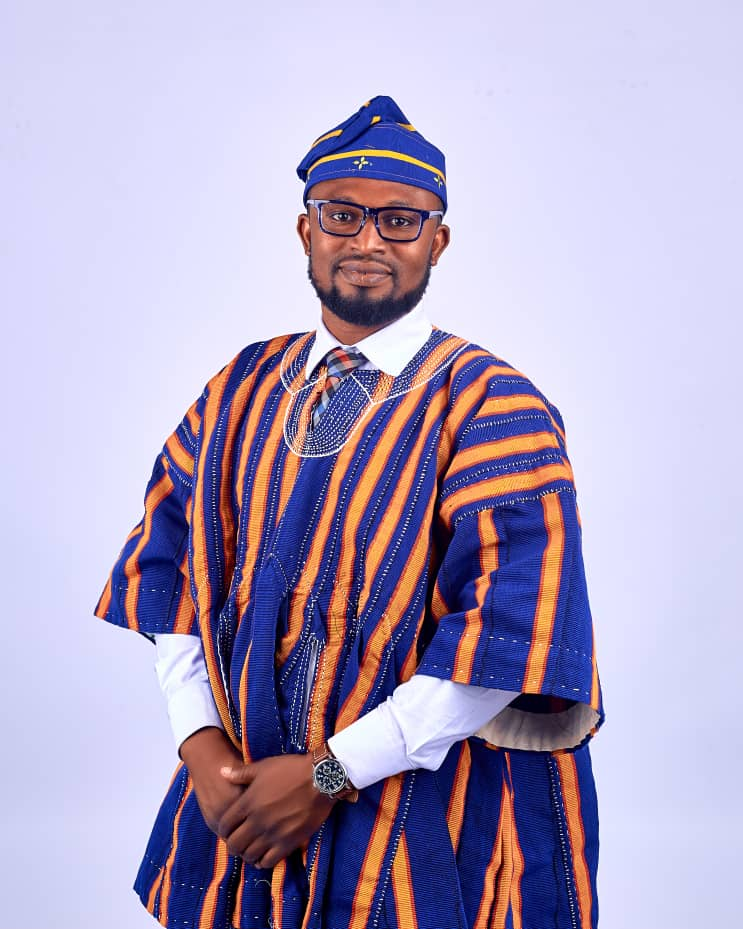
Bening Ahmed Pan African Union Secretary General

Ahmed Bening Wiisichong is a Ghanaian youth leader, Pan Africanist and a Social Entrepreneur. He was elected as the Secretary General of the Pan African Youth Union in November 2021 at the 4th Ordinary Congress of the Pan African Youth Union in Niamey, Niger. He is also the Africa Head Commonwealth Youth Innovation Hub.

== Education ==
He attended Nandom Senior High School and University for Development Studies, Tamale.

== Career ==
Ahmed has served as the Chairman of Operations of Africa Youth Connekt. He was elected the deputy secretary-general of the Pan African Youth Union in 2018 at the 5th Ordinary Congress on the Pan African Youth Union in Khartoum, Sudan.

He has been a member of the International Organizing Committee (IOC) of three successive World Festival of Youth and Students; South Africa 2010, Ecuador 2013 and Russia 2017. He is also a commonwealth young leader and has led several youth development advocacy initiatives on the African continent.

He led a team to discuss the xenophobic attacks in South Africa to map out comprehensive strategy to build cohesion and eliminate xenophobia.

He is Board member of South Africa BRICKS Youth Forum and Board Chair of Future Team Ghana. He served as the secretary-general of West Africa Youth Organization between 2013 and 2015. He has served as deputy commissioner for Great Run Africa and programs director for the All Africa Students Union. He also served as the secretary for the National Union of Ghana Students.

== Achievements ==
- Africa's most influential Youth Award by Afrabie Awards as the first Ghanaian to be awarded by the Afro-Arab Council
- Most inspirational Youth 2018 by Youth Mentors Achievers Awards, Upper West Regional Edition.
