= Yaw Appau =

Ghanaian judge

Justice Yaw Appau

Justice of the Supreme Court of Ghana
- In office June 2015 – August 2021
- Appointed by: John Mahama

Appeal Court Judge
- In office November, 2006 – June, 2015
- Nominated by: John Kufour

High Court Judge
- In office January, 2001 – November, 2006
- President: John Kufour

Personal details
- Born: 2 August 1951 (age 75) Ghana
- Education: Prempeh College; University of Education, Winneba (Ajumako Campus); University of Ghana; Ghana School of Law
- Profession: Judge

Yaw Appau is a Ghanaian judge who has served as a justice of the Supreme Court of Ghana from July 2015 to August 2021.

Justice Appau hails from Badu in the Tain District of Bono Region of Ghana. He was called to the Bar in 1982. Prior to his appointment at the Supreme Court of Ghana, he had served in various capacities in the Judiciary of Ghana. He was sworn into office on 29 June 2015.

== Early life and education ==
Appau was born on 2 August 1951 at Badu, a town in the Tain District of the Brong Ahafo Region. He is a tribal Koulango who live mostly in the Bono region of Ghana and the Zanzan district of Ivory Coast. He began schooling at the Wenchi West Primary School for his primary education and proceeded to the Bekwai Methodist Middle School for his Middle School Leaving Certificate. He was in Prempeh College in 1965 but was unable to complete his studies for his Ordinary-Level ('O'-Level) certificate due to financial constraints. He dropped out of the school in 1967 and enrolled at the Ajumako Teacher Training College (now a constituent college of the University of Education, Winneba), where he obtained his Teachers' Certificate "A". He later received his Ordinary-Level ('O'-Level) and Advanced-Level ('A'-Level) certificates as a private candidate. In 1977, he entered the University of Ghana to study law and political science and graduated in 1980 with his bachelor of arts degree in law and political science. That same year, he proceeded to the Ghana School of Law and completed his studies in 1982. He was called to the Bar as a barrister and solicitor of the Supreme Court of Ghana in December 1982.

== Career ==
Appau begun working as a teacher by profession. He taught in a number of schools including Droboso L/A Middle School and Frema L/A Middle School from 1971 to 1977. He also served as the headmaster of Subingya L/A Primary School. Appau became the Regional Coordinator of the then Students and Youth Task Force in the Northern Region after he was called to the bar in 1982. A year later he was appointed as the Deputy Regional Secretary for the Brong Ahafo Region.

=== Lawyer ===
He was called to the bar as a barrister and solicitor of the Supreme Court of Ghana in December 1982. In 1983, he was nominated to receive training in Havana, Cuba, for a ten-month course in international relations. He was appointed a member of the National Investigations Committee (NIC) upon his return in 1984. He resigned from the NIC in May 1985 and entered private legal practice at Barimah Chambers, Sunyani.

=== Judge ===
On 1 September 1991, he was appointed a district magistrate grade 1 at the Sekondi District Magistrate Court (the court functioned as a Family Tribunal and a Juvenile Court). He worked as a district magistrate from 1991 to 1995. While working as a District Magistrate, he was the supervisor of the Shama and Cape Coast District Magistrate Courts. In 1996 he was appointed a circuit court judge and posted to the Aflao Circuit Court. Four years later, he was promoted justice of the High Court and later posted to the Ashanti Region to serve as the supervising High Court Judge of the region. In 2006, Appau was elevated to the position of an appeal court judge. While serving in that capacity, he was appointed on 8 October 2012 as the Sole Commissioner of the Commission of Inquiry to look into Judgment Debts and other matters. He holds membership in associations locally and internationally, some of which include; the Association of Magistrates and Judges of Ghana (AMJG). He has also participated in various national and international conferences and also authored a number of papers on key topics.

== Appointment ==
Justice Appau was nominated together Justice Gabriel Pwamang by the then president, John Mahama. He was subsequently vetted by parliament on 3 June 2015 and approved by consensus on 24 June 2015. He was sworn into office together with Gabriel Pwamang on Monday, 29 June 2015.

He was part of a seven-member panel constituted by the Chief Justice, that heard the 2020 election petition by John Mahama against The Electoral Commission of Ghana and Nana Akufo-Addo.

== See also ==
- List of judges of the Supreme Court of Ghana
- Supreme Court of Ghana
