= D.D. Kuupole =

Professor Domwini Dabire Kuupole (born in 1956) is a former Vice Chancellor of the University of Cape Coast (UCC). He was the former Pro-Vice Chancellor of the university, before his induction into office as the ninth Vice-Chancellor (VC) of the university.

Prof Kuupole, took over from Prof Naana Jane Opoku-Agyemang, the first female VC the country has ever produced, when she proceeded on retirement on Sunday, September 30, 2012.

== Education ==
Professor Kuupole is from Nandom-Kogle in the Upper West Region of Ghana where he started his primary middle school education from 1962 to 1971.

He proceeded to Nandom Secondary School and later to the University of Cape Coast to pursue higher education and had his MPhil in French in France among numerous other courses both home and abroad and serves several boards with uncountable publications and research works to his credit.

Prior to his appointment as Vice Chancellor in October 2012, the Professor supervised undergraduate and postgraduate theses and has served in various capacities, including Head of the Department of French, Dean of the Faculty of Arts, and National President of the Alumni Association.

Professor Kuupole holds a BA (Hons) in French and a Diploma in Education from the University of Cape Coast. He pursued an MPhil and PhD at the Université de Franche-Comté, France.

Due to his extensive propagation of the French language, Professor Kuupole was awarded Officer of the Order of Academic Palms by the French Government in 2013.

He is married to Dr (Mrs) Alfredina Kuupole, with four children.
