= Lawra (Ghana parliament constituency) =

Constituency in Ghana

- constituency for the Parliament of Ghana
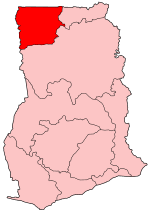
- District: Lawra Municipal District
- Region: Upper West Region of Ghana

Current constituency
- Party: National Democratic Congress
- MP: Bede A. Ziedeng

Lawra is one of the constituencies represented in the Parliament of Ghana. It elects one Member of Parliament (MP) by the first past the post system of election. Bede A. Ziedeng is the member of parliament for the constituency. Lawra is located in the Lawra District of the Upper West Region of Ghana.

== Members of Parliament ==
| Election | Member | Party |
|---|---|---|
| 2016 | Anthony N-yoh Abayifaa Karbo | New Patriotic Party |
