= Datooyili =

Datooyili is a community in Tamale Metropolitan District in the Northern Region of Ghana. Most of its inhabitants are Dagombas.

== See also ==
- Suburbs of Tamale (Ghana) metropolis
