= Ambrose Dery =

Ghanaian politician

Hon. Ambrose Dery MP
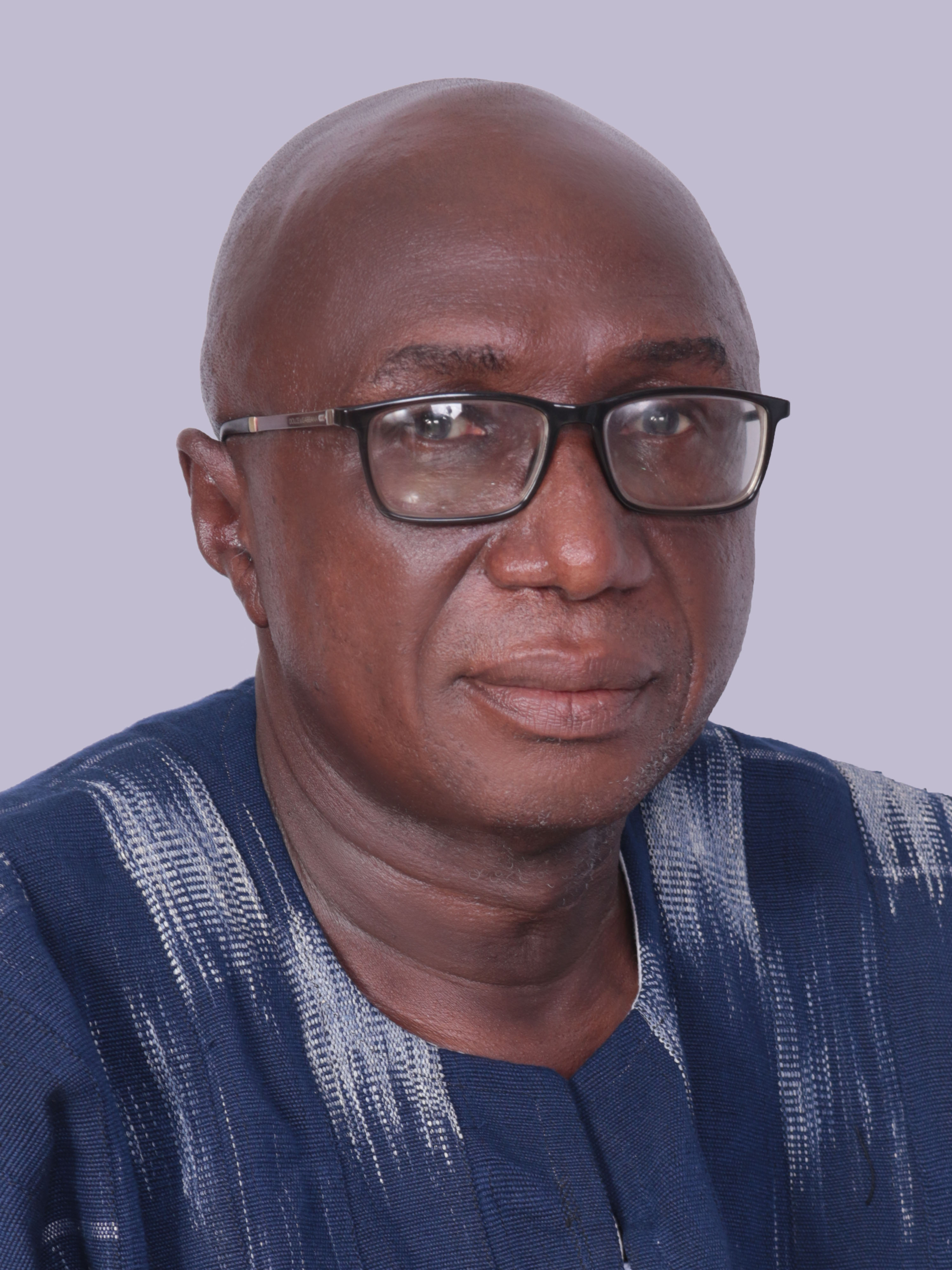

Minister for the Interior (Ghana)
- In office January 2017 – February 14, 2024
- President: Nana Akufo-Addo
- Preceded by: Prosper Douglas Bani
- Succeeded by: Henry Quartey

Member of the Ghana Parliament for Nandom (Ghana parliament constituency)
- Incumbent
- Assumed office 2016
- President: Nana Akufo-Addo

Personal details
- Born: 23 August 1956 (age 70)
- Party: New Patriotic Party
- Children: 1
- Education: University of Ghana (Bachelor of Law)

Ambrose Dery (on 23 August 1956), a Ghanaian lawyer, politician and member of Parliament for Nandom Constituency. He won the constituency during the 2016 elections on the ticket of the New Patriotic Party. He was interior minister of Ghana from 2017 to February 2024.

== Education and career ==
Dery had his secondary school education at Navrongo Secondary School. He entered the University of Ghana in 1997 and graduated afterwards with a BL and LL. B. He was called to the Bar in 1982. As legal Practitioner, he cofounded a legal chamber in Bolgatanga with the late Laary Bimi. He later became founder, head and managing director of Dery & Co, an Accra-based law firm.

=== Political career ===
Before entering parliament in 2008, Dery was appointed Deputy Attorney General in 2003. He also served in two ministerial positions as the Regional Minister for the Upper West Region from 2004 to 2006 and Minister of State in the Ministry of Justice from 2005 to 2007. He won the Nandom parliamentary seat, then Lawra-Nandom Constituency in 2008 but lost the seat to Benjamin Kumbuor in the 2012 elections. In Parliament, he was Deputy Minority Leader. He also served as the Chairman of the Water Aid Partner Round Table, an association of local NGOs funded by Water Aid for ten years (1993–2003). On the list presented to parliament for approval on 21 January 2021, Dery was nominated by the president of Ghana, Nana Akufo-Addo, to maintain his position as the Interior minister and was later relieved from office on February 14, 2024, prior to the end of his tenure of office.

== Personal life ==
Ambrose is a Catholic and married with one child.

== Committees ==
He was a member of the Constitutional, Legal and Parliamentary Affairs and also a member of Selection Committee.
