= Bede Ziedeng =

Ghanaian politician

Hon. Bede A. Ziedeng MP
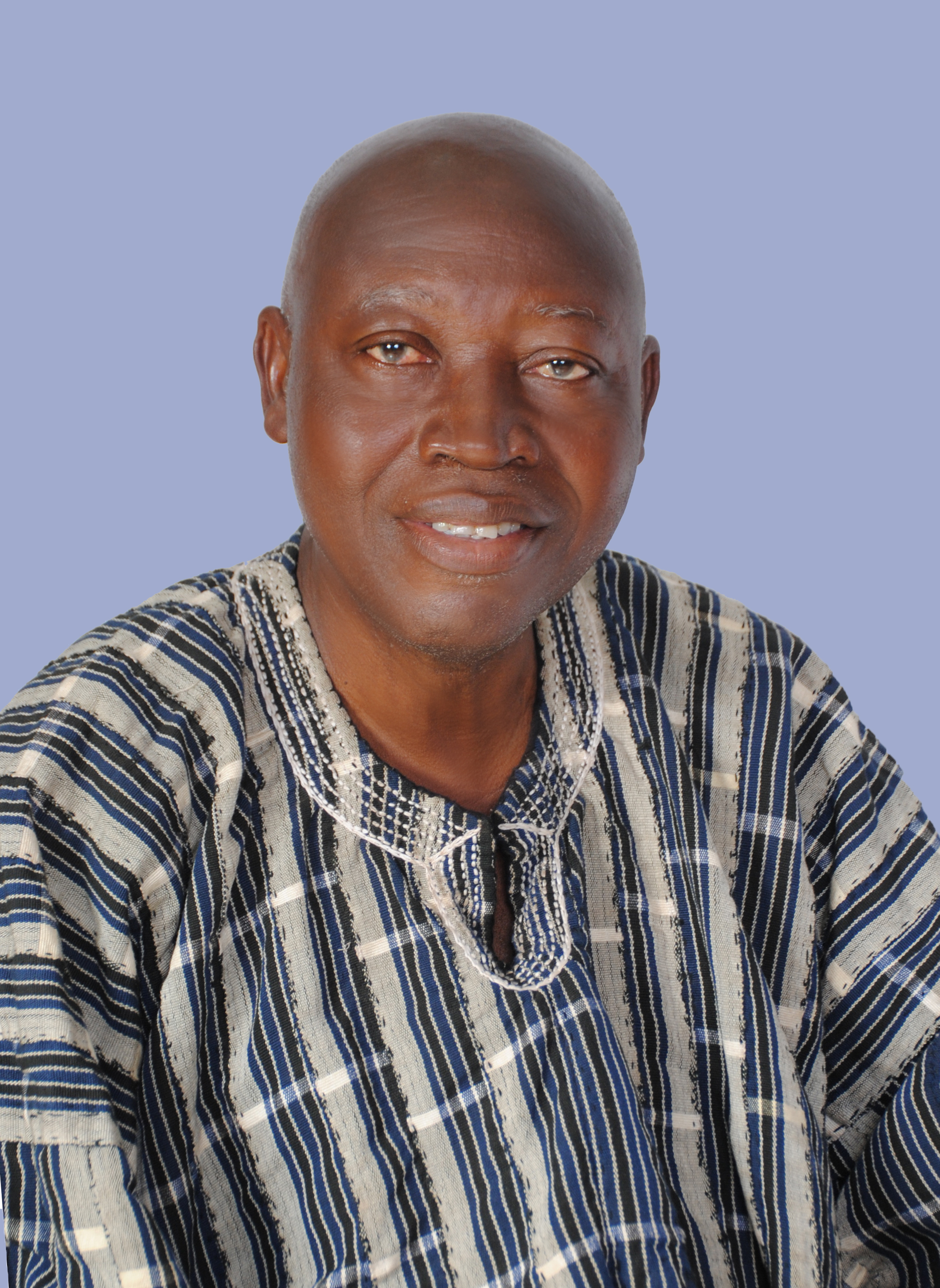
- President: John Dramani Mahama

Personal details
- Born: Ghana
- Party: NDC
- Profession: lawyer
- Portfolio: Deputy Regional Minister (Upper West Region), Regional Minister Upper West Region/ Northern Region, National Deputy Director of elections N D C

Bede Anwataazumo Ziedeng (born on Friday, 22 October 1954) popularly known as Bede Ziedeng is a Ghanaian politician. In 2008, Bede Ziedeng contested the Lawra-Nandom Parliamentary election on the ticket of the Democratic Freedom Party. He lost to Hon. Ambrose Dery of the New Patriotic Party. Ziedeng served as the General Secretary of the Democratic Freedom Party (DFP) in 2006.

== Early life ==
Bede Ziedeng hails from Eremon-Lawra in the Upper West Region. He had his Ordinary and Advance level certificate in 1978. Bede Ziedeng earned LLB Hons in 1984 as well as Barrister at Law in 1986.

== Career ==
Bede Ziedeng is a bank clerk for housing and construction. He was the regional chair at the Office of Revenue Commissioners (Northern & Upper East). He serves as Deputy Regional Minister for Northern and Upper West Region. He is part of the Subsidiary Legislation Committee as the Vice Chairperson in parliament. Bede Ziedeng also serves on Roads and Transport Committee in parliament.

In 2008, Ziedeng contested the Lawra-Nandom Parliamentary election on the ticket of the Democratic Freedom Party, but lost to Hon. Ambrose Dery of the New Patriotic Party. He then contested in 2016 parliamentary election, again losing. Bede Ziedeng contested in 2020 and won. He is the Member of parliament (MP) for Lawra Constituency in the Upper West Region.

== Personal life ==
Bede Ziedeng is a Christian.
