= Anthony Bondong =

Ghanaian politician

Member of parliament for Lawra Nandom Constituency
- In office 7 January 1997 – 6 January 2001
- President: John Jerry Rawlings

Personal details
- Born: Lawra Nandom, Upper West Region Ghana)
- Party: National Democratic Congress
- Occupation: Politician

Anthony Bondong is a Ghanaian politician who was a member of the second Parliament of the Fourth Republic representing the Lawra Nandon Constituency in the Upper West region of Ghana.

== Early life ==
Bondong was born at Lawra Nandon in the Upper West Region of Ghana.

== Politics ==
Bondong was first elected into Parliament on the Ticket of the National Democratic congress for the Lawra Nandom Constituency in the Upper West Region of Ghana during the December 1996 Ghanaian general elections. He polled 22,441 votes out of the 33,119 valid votes cast representing 67.8% over Gyader Edward Nminyuor of the People's National Convention who polled 8,486 votes and Naapie Guomi of the New Patriotic Party who polled 2,192 votes. He was defeated by Benjamin Kumbuor in the party's 2000 primaries elections. He served one term as a parliamentarian.
