= InfoDev =

infoDev is a World Bank Group program that supports high-growth entrepreneurs in developing economies. The program is part of the Innovation and Entrepreneurship Unit of the World Bank Group's Trade and Competitiveness Global Practice.

infoDev connects entrepreneurs with knowledge, funding and mentors through a global network of business incubators. The program has launched Climate Innovation Centers, Mobile Application Labs (mLabs), and Agribusiness Entrepreneurship Centers in developing countries around the world, including the Caribbean, Ethiopia, Ghana, Kenya, Morocco, South Africa and Vietnam.

== Climate Technology Program ==
The Climate Technology Program helps developing economies identify profitable solutions to climate change. A 2015 infoDev study, Building Competitive Green Industries, found that $6.4 trillion will be invested in clean technologies in developing countries over the next decade.

infoDev has launched seven Climate Innovation Centers, which offer seed financing, policy interventions, network linkages, and technical and business training to entrepreneurs. In 2015, Climate Innovation Centers supported 270 clean technology startups.

== Digital Entrepreneurship Program ==
The Digital Entrepreneurship Program supports the growth of competitive mobile application industries in emerging and frontier markets. The program has established Mobile Application Labs (mLabs)—incubation facilities and innovation hubs for digital entrepreneurs—in Kenya, South Africa and Senegal. Digital marketing based on four piece's :

1)Product 
2)Promotion 
3)placement 
4)Price 

infoDev published a Business Analytics Toolkit for Tech Hub Managers in 2015.

== Agribusiness Entrepreneurship Program ==
The Agribusiness Entrepreneurship Program supports the growth of competitive agro-processing enterprises by advancing innovation in products, processes and business models. The World Bank Group estimates that Africa’s food market will be worth $1 trillion by 2030.

The program has launched Agribusiness Entrepreneurship Centers in Tanzania and Nepal.

== Access to Finance Program ==
The Access to Finance Program connects entrepreneurs with early-stage capital and networks. The program also publishes research on innovative forms of financing for entrepreneurs in developing economies, including crowdfunding and angel investors.

infoDev has published Crowdfunding in Emerging Markets: Lessons from East African Startups and Creating Your Own Angel Investor Group: A Guide for Emerging and Frontier Markets.
