= Ashesi University =

Private university in Ghana

- Type: Private
- Established: 2002; 24 years ago
- Chairman: Dr. Sangu Delle
- President: Patrick G. Awuah, Jr.
- Provost: Angela Owusu Ansah
- Students: 1253 (January 2021)
- Location: Berekuso, Eastern Region, Ghana; 05°45′35″N 00°13′11″W
- Campus: Peri-urban
- Website: www.ashesi.edu.gh

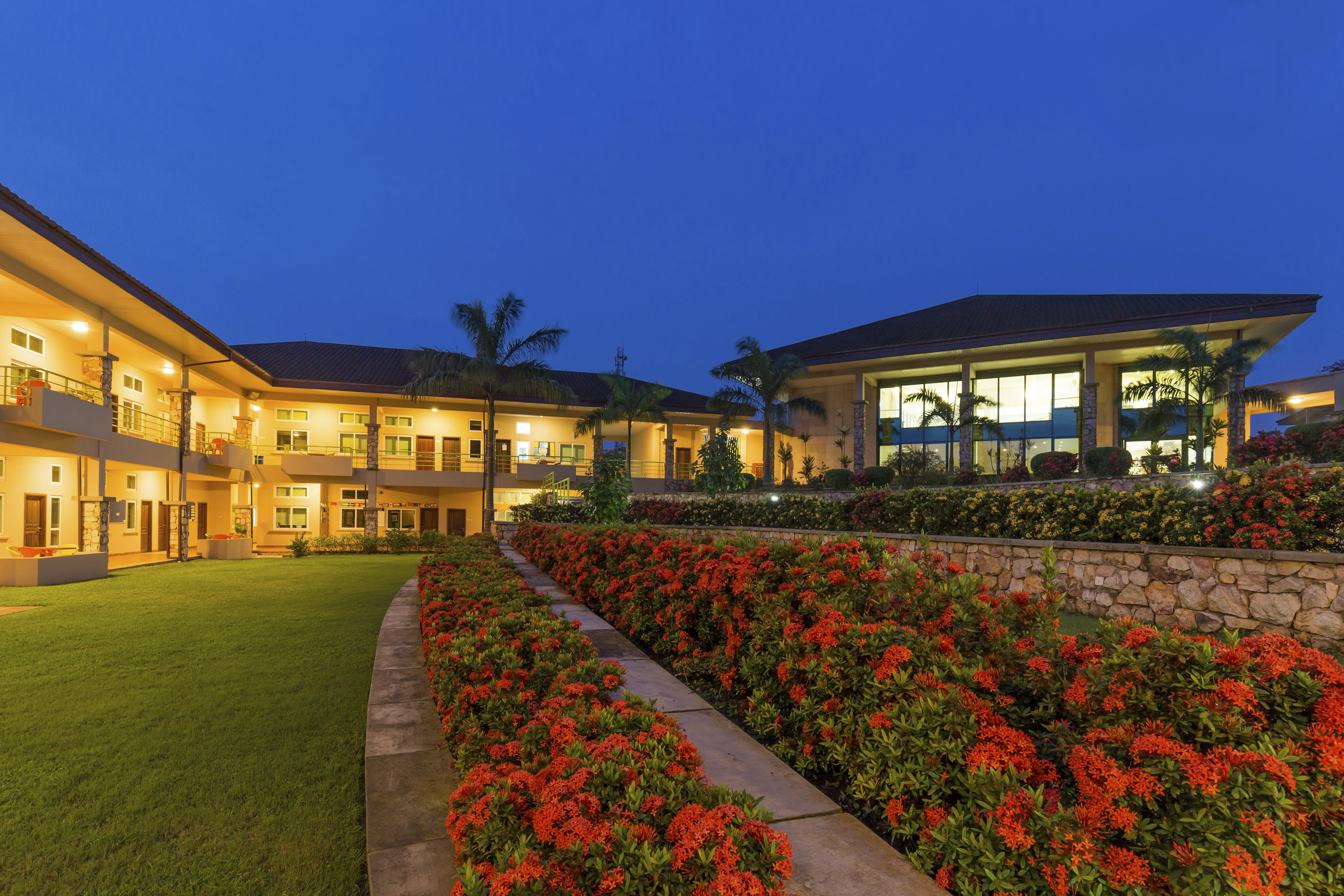
Ashesi's Archer Cornfield Courtyard

Ashesi University (/ɑːʃˈs/ a-shii-si') is a private, non-profit and non-sectarian university located in Berekuso, near Accra.

Ashesi was established as an independent, public benefit education institution operating on a not-for-profit basis. The university obtained accreditation from the Ghanaian National Accreditation Board (now the Ghana Tertiary Education Commission) in September 2001 to operate under the mentorship of the University of Cape Coast (UCC), with degrees conferred by UCC. Ashesi began instruction on 4 March 2002. Ashesi University received a Presidential Charter from the President of Ghana, effective January 2018, making it an independent university that confers its own degrees. It is a member of the Council of Independent Universities, the Association of African Universities and the Association of Commonwealth Universities.

== History ==
=== Feasibility study ===
A team of four MBA students from the University of California Berkeley's Haas School of Business travelled to Ghana to evaluate the feasibility of establishing a new university in 1998. The team administered over 3,300 surveys to students and parents; conducted interviews and focus groups with parents, teachers and business leaders; and gathered secondary information from local and international sources. The study concluded there was significant demand for a new private university in Ghana, that Ghanaian parents were willing to pay for high-quality local university education, and that the Ghanaian government supported private involvement in tertiary education.

=== Foundation and accreditation ===
The Ashesi University Foundation was founded in 1999. Its name transcribed in Akan as " Ahyɛase" means "beginning" The university was granted accreditation by the National Accreditation Board of Ghana in 2001 under the mentorship of the University of Cape Coast and began classes in 2002. Ashesi students elected the first female university student government president in Ghana's history in 2006 and its first Examination Honour Code in 2008. Ashesi University completed a new campus in Berekuso in 2011. In 2015, Ashesi launched its engineering programme, and its founder, Patrick Awuah, became a MacArthur fellow. In 2018, it received a charter from the president of Ghana, allowing it to grant degrees in its own name instead of that of the University of Cape Coast.

== Campus ==
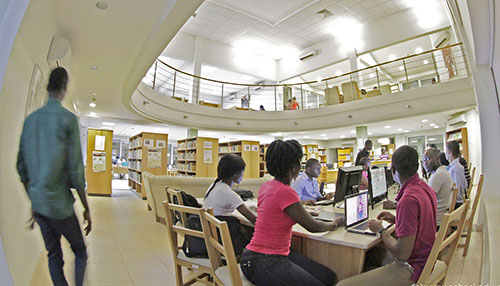
The Todd & Ruth Warren Library at Ashesi

Ashesi University's 100-acre campus contains the Natembea Health Centre, two sports courts and a sports centre with a football field, running track and gym. It also hosts the Ghana Climate Innovation Centre.

The architecture borrows from the Ghanaian vernacular, with echoes of traditional compound houses, as well as elements of traditional Northern dwellings. The natural contours of the site are used in concert with buildings to create exterior gathering spaces throughout campus, as well as ramps that provide wheelchair access to buildings. Buildings are designed to maximize natural views, light and ventilation. Groundwater is supplemented with harvested rainwater, filtered and treated to provide potable water all year round. A community-scale sewage and organic treatment plant provides environmental and economic benefits by converting waste to biogas for some of the campus' cooking needs and recycling treated water for landscaping. The university meets 40% of its daytime electrical needs with solar power.

== Organisation and governance ==
Ashesi University has 88 teaching staff and more than 150 administrative staff organised into the departments of Humanities and Social Sciences, Business Administration, Computer Science and Information Systems, and Engineering. The Ashesi University Foundation, which raises funding to support the mission of the university, is a United States 501(c)(3) organization. The foundation is overseen by its board of trustees, while the university is overseen by its board of directors.

== Academics and recognition ==
Ashesi offers a four-year bachelor program grounded in a multidisciplinary core curriculum, featuring majors in business administration, management information systems, computer science, electrical and electronic engineering, computer engineering, mechanical engineering and LLB in law with public policy It runs Ashesi Innovation Experience, a two-week program which exposes students between the ages of 15 and 19 to Leadership, Entrepreneurship, Robotics, Creativity and Engineering basics to help prepare them for transitioning into college, and oversees the curriculum development for the Next Generation Cocoa Youth Programme.

In 2012, the university was ranked by PwC as the seventh most respected organisation in Ghana, becoming the first university to make the list. Ashesi's president, Patrick Awuah, was also ranked the 4th Most Respected CEO in Ghana. It was ranked as one of Ghana's 50 Best Places to work by Ghanaian consulting firm Goodman AMC in 2015; it was again the only university on the list. Also in that year, Ashesi's president was ranked by Fortune as one of the World's 50 Greatest Leaders. In 2017, Ashesi was awarded the World Innovation Summit in Education Prize, one of the world's biggest prizes in education, for its impact on higher education in Africa. In 2020, Ashesi University ranked first in Ghana, ninth in Africa, and in the world's top 400 in the Global Times Higher Education University Impact Rankings.

In 2024, Ashesi launched an LLB in law with public policy program after receiving approval from the Ghana Tertiary Education Commission (GTEC) and the Ghana General Legal Council (GLC).

== See also ==
- List of universities in Ghana

== Sources ==
- Ghana News Agency (Ghana): "Ashesi University Re-Accredited", 10 August 2005.
- "Ashesi breaks ground on new campus", August 2009.
- "Ashesi celebrates historic milestone with inauguration of its new campus", August 2011.
- Awuah, Patrick. 2019. "Courage is the cornerstone of progress". In Practicing development: Upending assumptions for positive change, edited by Susan H Holcombe and Marion Howard. Kumarian Press, Boulder. ISBN 978-1-62637-795-0.
