= Nandom (Ghana parliament constituency) =

Constituency in Ghana

- constituency for the Parliament of Ghana
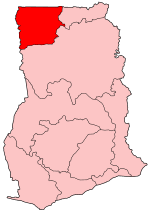
- District: Nandom District
- Region: Upper West Region of Ghana

Current constituency
- Party: National Democratic Congress
- MP: Richard Kuuire

Nandom is one of the constituencies represented in the Parliament of Ghana. It elects one Member of Parliament (MP) by the first past the post system of election. Richard Kuuire is the member of parliament for the constituency. Nandom is located in the Nandom Municipal District of the Upper West Region of Ghana.

== Members of Parliament ==
Election	Member	Party
2016	Ambrose Dery	New Patriotic Party
