= List of senior high schools in Ghana =

Location of Ghana
| Location of Ghana | Number of public/private educational institutions | |
| Location of Ghana | Category | Number |
|---|---|---|
| Location of Ghana | Kindergarten school | 22,052 |
| Location of Ghana | Primary school | 22,289 |
| Location of Ghana | Junior high school | 14,769 |
| Location of Ghana | Senior high school | 981 |
| Location of Ghana | Colleges of education | 46 |
| Location of Ghana | Universities | 10 |

== Ashanti Region ==
There are more than 180 senior high schools in the region.

| School | Type | Location(s) | Website |
|---|---|---|---|
Senior high schools in Bosome Freho District
| Bosome Senior High Technical School | Technical school | Asiwa | —N/a |
Senior high schools in Adansi North District and Adansi South District
| Akrofuom Senior High Technical School | Technical school | Akrofuom | —N/a |
| Asare Bediako Senior High School | Public school | Akrokerri | —N/a |
| Bodwesango Senior High School | Public school | Bodwesango | —N/a |
| Dompoase Senior High School | Public school | Dompoase | —N/a |
| New Edubiase Senior High School | Public school | New Edubiase | —N/a |
Senior high schools in Obuasi Municipal District
| Adansi Technical Institute | Private, Technical | Obuasi | —N/a |
| Christ the King Catholic Senior High School | Catholic school | Obuasi | —N/a |
| Father Augustine Murphy Commercial School | Technical school | Obuasi | —N/a |
| Just Love Senior High School | Private school | Obuasi | —N/a |
| Obuasi Senior High Technical School | Technical school | Obuasi | —N/a |
| St. Margaret Senior High School | Private school | Obuasi | —N/a |
Senior high schools in Afigya-Sekyere District
| Adu Gyamfi Senior High School | Public school | Jamasi | —N/a |
| Agona Senior High Technical School | Technical school | Agona | —N/a |
| Konadu Yiadom Senior High School | Public school | Asaman | —N/a |
| Okomfo Anokye Senior High School | Public school | Wiamoase | —N/a |
| Osei Tutu II College (Great Osec - PE NOKORE NO) | Public school | Tetrem, Afigya-Sekyere District | Website |
| S.D.A. Senior High School | Public school | Agona | —N/a |
Senior high schools in Ahafo Ano North District and Ahafo Ano South District
Ahafo Ano North District
| Maabang Senior High School | Technical school | Maabang | —N/a |
| Tepa Senior High School | Public school | Tepa | —N/a |
Ahafo Ano South District
| Mankranso Senior High School | Public school | Mankranso | —N/a |
Senior high schools in Amansie Central District
Amansie Central District
| Jacobu Senior High School | Public, Technical | Jacobu | —N/a |
Senior high schools in Amansie East District and Amansie West District
Amansie East District
| Oppong Memorial Senior High School | Public school | Kokofu | —N/a |
| Saint Joseph Senior High School | Technical school | Ahwiren | —N/a |
| Seventh Day Adventist Senior High School | Public, Seventh-day Adventist | Bekwai | —N/a |
| Wesley High School | Public school | Bekwai | —N/a |
Amansie West District
| Danyaseman Catholic Senior High School | Catholic school | Huntado, Amansie East District | —N/a |
| Esase Bontefufuo Senior High School | Public school | Esase Bontefufuo | —N/a |
| Manso-Adubia Senior High School | Public school | Adubia | —N/a |
| Mansoman Senior High School | Public school | Manso Atwere | —N/a |
Senior high schools in Asante Akim North District and Asante Akim South District
Asante Akim North District
| Agogo Collins Senior High School | Public school | Agogo | —N/a |
| Agogo State College | Public school | Agogo | —N/a |
| Konongo Odumase Senior High School | Public school | Konongo-Odumase | —N/a |
| Owerriman Senior High School | Public school | Domeabra | —N/a |
Asante Akim South District
| Bompata Presby Senior High School | Public school | Bompata | —N/a |
| Juaso Senior High School | Technical school | Juaso | —N/a |
| Jubile Senior High School | Public school | Dampong | —N/a |
| Ofoase Senior High School | Technical school | Ofoase | —N/a |
Senior high schools in Atwima Mponua District and Atwima Nwabiagya District
| Barekese Senior High School | Public school | Barekese | —N/a |
| Mpasatia Senior High School | Technical school | Mpasatia | —N/a |
| Nkawie Senior High Technical School | Technical school | Nkawie | —N/a |
| Nyinahin Catholic Senior High School | Catholic school | Nyinahin | —N/a |
| Osei Tutu Senior High School | Public, Methodist, all-boys | Akropong | Website |
| Toase Senior High School | Public school | Toase | —N/a |
| Yaa Asantewaa Girls' Senior High School | Public, all-girls | Tanoso | Website |
Senior high schools in Botsomtwe/Atwima/Kwanhuma District
| Afia Kobi Ampem Girls Senior High School | Public, all-girls | Trabuom | —N/a |
| Beposo Senior High School | Public school | Beposo | —N/a |
| Ejuraman Senior High School | Public school | Ejura | —N/a |
| Jachie-Pramso Secondary School | Public school | Jachie-Pramso | —N/a |
| St. Margaret High School | Public school | Feyiase | —N/a |
| Sekyedumase Senior High School | Public school | Seko | —N/a |
Senior high schools in Kumasi Metropolitan District
| Adventist Senior High School (Atitire) | Public school | Bantama-Kumasi, Kumasi | —N/a |
| Angel Educational Complex - Kronom | Technical school | Kronom, Kumasi | —N/a |
| Anglican Senior High School | Public, Anglican | Asem-Kumasi | Website |
| Asanteman Senior High School (The Royals, NANANOM) | Public school | Bantama | —N/a |
| Ashanti Kingdom Senior High School | Public school | Ahodwo Daban-Kumasi, Kumasi | —N/a |
| Ghana Armed Forces Senior High School | Technical school | Bantama-Kumasi, Kumasi | —N/a |
| Ideal College | Public school | Boadi | —N/a |
| Islamic Senior High School | Public school | Abrepo | —N/a |
| KNUST Senior High School | Public school | Kumasi | —N/a |
| Kumasi Academy | Public, Baptist | Asokore Mampong | Website |
| Kumasi Girls Senior High School | Public, all-girls | Abrepo-Kumasi, Kumasi | —N/a |
| Kumasi High School | Public, all-boys | Atonsu Gyenase, Kumasi | Website |
| Kumasi Senior High Technical School (Animuonyamfo) | Technical school | Patasi-Kumasi | Website |
| Kumasi Technical Institute | Technical school | Kumasi | Website |
| Mmofraturo Girls Secondary School | Public, all-girls | Kumasi | —N/a |
| Opoku Ware School | Public, all-boys | Santasi | Website |
| Osei Kyeretwie Senior High School | Public school | Old Tafo | Website |
| Pentecost Senior High School | Public school | Breman-kumasi, Kumasi | —N/a |
| Prempeh College | Public, Boarding, all-boys | Kumasi | —N/a |
| Roman Girls Nursing Training School | Nursing school, all-girls | Suame-Kumasi, Kumasi | —N/a |
| Saint Hubert Minor Seminary Senior High School | Public school | Kumasi | —N/a |
| Sakafia Islamic Senior High School | Public, Islamic | Ayigya, Kumasi | —N/a |
| Serwaa Nyarko Girls' Senior High School | Public, all-girls | New Tafo, Kumasi | —N/a |
| St. Louis Senior High School | Public, Catholic, all-girls | Oduom | Website |
| T.I. Ahmadiyya Senior High School | Public, Ahmadiyya | Kumasi | Website |
Senior high schools in Kwabre East Municipal District
| Adanwomase Senior High School | Public school | Adanwomase | —N/a |
| Aduman Senior High School | Public school | Aduman | —N/a |
| Adventist Girls High School | Public, Adventist, all-girls | Aduman | —N/a |
| Antoa Senior High School | Public school | Antoa | —N/a |
| Gyeama Penson Senior High School | Technical school | Aboaso | —N/a |
| Kofi Adjei Senior High School | Technical school | Bampanase | —N/a |
| Simms Senior High School | Technical school | Fawoade | —N/a |
Senior high schools in Offinso District
| Akumadan Senior High School | Public school | Akumadan | —N/a |
| Dwamena Akenten Senior High School | Public school | Newtown, Offinso District | —N/a |
| Namong Senior High School | Public school | Namong | —N/a |
| St. Jerome Senior High School | Public school | Abofour | —N/a |
Senior high schools in Sekyere Kumawu District
| Dadease Agriculture Senior High School | Technical school | Dadease | —N/a |
| Bankoman Senior High School | Public school | Banko | —N/a |
| Bodomase Senior High School | Public school | Bodomase | —N/a |
| Tweneboa Kodua Senior High School | Public school | Kumawu | —N/a |
Senior high schools in Sekyere East District and Sekyere West District
Sekyere East District
| Effiduase Senior High School | Technical school | Effiduase | —N/a |
| Krobea Asante Vocational/Technical Institute | Technical school | Asokore | —N/a |
| T.I. Ahmadiyya Girls Senior High School | Public, Ahmadiyya, all-girls | Asokore | —N/a |
Sekyere West District
| Amaniampong Senior High School | Public school | Mampong | —N/a |
| Nsutaman Catholic Senior High School | Catholic school | Nsuta | —N/a |
| Saint Joseph Senior High School | Technical school | Mampong | —N/a |
| St. Monica's Senior High School | Public, Anglican, all-girls | Mampong | —N/a |
Senior Secondary schools in Ejisu-Juaben Municipal District
| Achinakrom Senior High School | Public school | Achinakrom, Ejisu | —N/a |
| Bonwire Senior High Technical School | Technical school | Bonwire | —N/a |
| Church of Christ Senior High School | Public school | Adadeentem | —N/a |
| Ejisu Senior High Technical School | Technical school | Ejisu | —N/a |
| Ejisuman Senior High School | Public school | Ejisu | —N/a |
| Juaben Senior High School | Public school | Juaben | —N/a |

== Bono, Bono East & Ahafo Regions ==
| School | Type | Location(s) | Website |
|---|---|---|---|
Senior high schools in Asunafo North District and Asunafo South District
| Abeaseman Community Day Senior High School | Public school | Abease | —N/a |
| Ahafoman Senior High School | Technical school | Goaso | —N/a |
| Ghana Greentech Academy | Private, Technical | Mim | —N/a |
| Kukuom Agriculture Senior High School | Public school | Kukuom | —N/a |
| Mim Senior High School | Public school | Mim | —N/a |
Senior high schools in Asutifi District
| Acherensua Senior High School | Public school | Acherensua | —N/a |
| Gyamfi Kumanin Senior High School | Technical school | Wamahinso | —N/a |
| Hwidiem Senior High School | Public school | Hwidiem | —N/a |
| OLA Girls Senior High School | Public, Catholic, all-girls | Kenyasi | —N/a |
Senior Secondary schools in Atebubu-Amantin District
| Atebubu Senior High School | Public school | Atebubu | —N/a |
| Amanten Senior High School | Public school | Amanten | —N/a |
| Prang Senior High School | Public school | Prang, Atebubu-Amantin District | —N/a |
| Yeji Senior High School | Technical school | Yeji | —N/a |
Senior high schools in Berekum District
| Berekum Senior High School | Public school | Berekum | —N/a |
| Jinjini Senior High School | Public school | Jinjini | —N/a |
| Methodist Senior High School | Public school | Biadan | —N/a |
| Presbyterian Senior High School | Technical school | Berekum | —N/a |
Senior high schools in Dormaa District
| Dormaa Senior High School | Public school | Dormaa Ahenkro | Website |
| Mansen Comm. Day Senior High School | Commercial school | Wamfie | —N/a |
| Nkrankwanta Comm. Senior High School | Commercial school | Nkrankwanta | —N/a |
| Wamanafo Comm. Day Senior High School | Commercial, Technical | Wamanafo | —N/a |
Senior high schools in Jaman North District and Jaman South District
| Drobo Senior High School | Public school | Drobo | —N/a |
| Goka Senior High School | Technical school | Goka, Jaman North District | —N/a |
| Nafana Senior High School | Public school | Sampa | —N/a |
| Our Lady of Providence Senior High School | Public school | Kwasi Buokrom | —N/a |
| Sumaman Senior High School | Public school | Suma-Ahenkro | —N/a |
Senior high schools in Kintampo North District and Kintampo South District
| Jema Senior High School | Public school | Jema | —N/a |
| Kintampo Senior High School | Public school | Kintampo | —N/a |
Senior high schools in Nkoranza District
| Busunya Senior High School | Public school | Busunya | —N/a |
| Nkoranza Senior High School | Technical school | Nkoranza | —N/a |
| Yefiriman Senior High School | Public school | Yefiri, Nkoranza District | —N/a |
Senior high schools in Sene District
| Kajaji Senior High School | Public school | Kajaji Settlement Town | —N/a |
| Kwame Danso Senior High School | Technical school | Kwame Danso | —N/a |
Senior high schools in Sunyani District
| Abesim Senior High School | Community school | Abesim | —N/a |
| Chiraa Senior High School | Public school | Chiraa | —N/a |
| Lawrence Demonstration Senior High School | Commercial school | Sunyani | —N/a |
| Notre Dame High School | Public, Catholic, all-girls | Sunyani | —N/a |
| Odomaseman Day Senior High School | Public school | Odomase | —N/a |
| Sunyani Senior High School | Public school | Sunyani | Website |
| Sacred Heart Senior High School | Public school | Nsoatre | —N/a |
| St. James Seminary Senior High School | Public, Catholic | Abesim | —N/a |
| Sunyani Business Senior High School (SUBSEC) | Commercial school | Sunyani | Website |
| Twene Amanfo Senior High School | Technical school | Sunyani | —N/a |
Senior high schools in Tano North District and Tano South District
| Bechem Presbyterian Senior High School | Public school | Bechem | —N/a |
| Boakye Tromo Senior High School | Technical school | Duayaw Nkwanta | —N/a |
| Bomaa Comm. Senior High School | Commercial school | Bomaa | —N/a |
| Duayaw Nkwanta Senior High School | Public school | Duayaw Nkwanta | —N/a |
| Serwaa Kesse Girls' Senior High School | Public, all-girls | Duayaw Nkwanta | |
| Techimantia Presbyterian Senior High School | Commercial school | Techimantia | —N/a |
| Yamfo Anglican Senior High School | Public school | Yamfo | —N/a |
Senior high schools in Techiman Municipal District
| Asuogyaman Senior High School | Technical school | Aworowa | —N/a |
| Buoyem Senior High School | Public school | Boyem, Techiman Municipal District | —N/a |
| Guakro Effa Senior High School | Public school | Offuman | —N/a |
| Techiman Senior High School | Public school | Techiman | —N/a |
| Tuobodom Senior High School | Technical school | Tuobodom | —N/a |
Senior high schools in Wenchi District
| Badu Senior High School | Technical school | Badu, Wenchi | —N/a |
| Koase Senior High School | Technical school | Koase, Wenchi | —N/a |
| Menji Senior High School | Public school | Menji, Wenchi | —N/a |
| Nkoranman Senior High School | Public school | Seikwa, Wenchi | —N/a |
| Wenchi Methodist Senior High School | Public school | Wenchi | —N/a |

== Central Region ==
| School | Type | Location(s) | Website |
|---|---|---|---|
Senior high schools in Abura/Asebu/Kwamankese District
| Abakrampa Senior High Technical School | Technical school | Abakrampa | —N/a |
| Aburaman Senior High School | Public school | Abura Dunkwa | —N/a |
| Andam Senior High & Technical School | Technical school | Oduponkpehe | —N/a |
| Asuansi Technical Institute | Technical school | Nyamedom | —N/a |
Senior high schools in Agona District
| Kwanyako Senior High School | Public school | Kwanyako | —N/a |
| Naana Khadijah Islamic Girls School | Commercial, Islamic, all-girls | Nyakrom | —N/a |
| Nsaba Presbyterian Senior High School | Public school | Nsaba | —N/a |
| Nyakrom Day Senior High School | Public school | Nyakrom | —N/a |
| Pank Senior High School | Public school | Bawjiase, Agona District | —N/a |
| Siddiq Senior High School | Public school | Nyakrom | —N/a |
| Swedru School of Business | Commercial school | Swedru | —N/a |
| Swedru Senior High School | Public school | Swedru | —N/a |
| | Senior high schools in Ajumako/Enyan/Essiam District | | |
| Besease Comm. Senior High School | Commercial school | Besease | —N/a |
| Enyan Denkyira Senior High School | Public school | Denkyira | —N/a |
| Mando Senior High Tech School | Public school | Mando, Ajumako | —N/a |
| | Senior high schools in Asikuma/Odoben/Brakwa District | | |
| Breman Asikuma Senior High School | Public school | Breman Asikuma | Website |
| Odoben Senior High School | Public school | Odoben | —N/a |
| | Senior high schools in Assin North District and Assin South District | | |
| Adankwaman Comm. Senior High School | Commercial school | Assin Darman | —N/a |
| Assin Manso Senior High School | Public school | Assin Manso | —N/a |
| Assin North Senior High School | Technical school | Assin Asempaneye | —N/a |
| Assin Nsuta Senior High School | Public school | Assin Nsuta | —N/a |
| Nyankumase Ahenkro Senior High School | Public school | Nyankumase Ahenkro | —N/a |
| Obiri Yeboah Senior High School | Public school | Assin Fosu | —N/a |
| | Senior high schools in Awutu/Effutu/Senya District | | |
| Awutu-Winton Senior High School | Private School (fee-free) | Awutu Breku | Website |
| Obrakyere Senior High School | Technical school | Obrakyere | —N/a |
| Senya Senior High School | Public school | Senya | —N/a |
| Winneba Senior High School | Public school | Winneba | —N/a |
| | Senior high schools in Cape Coast Municipal District | | |
| Aggrey Memorial A.M.E. Zion Senior High School | Public, Boarding | Cape Coast | |
| Academy of Christ the King | Public school | Cape Coast | —N/a |
| Adisadel College | Boarding, all-boys | Cape Coast | Website |
| Cape Coast Technical Institute | Technical school | Cape Coast | —N/a |
| Commercial Service Institute (CSI) | Commercial school | Cape Coast | —N/a |
| Effutu Senior High School | Technical school | Effutu | Website |
| Ghana National College | Public school | Cape Coast | Website |
| Holy Child High School | Public, Boarding, all-girls | Cape Coast | —N/a |
| Mfantsipim School | Public, all-boys (established as Wesleyan High School) | Cape Coast | Website |
| Oguaa Senior High School | Technical school | Cape Coast | —N/a |
| St. Augustine's College | Public, Boarding, all-boys | Cape Coast | —N/a |
| University Practice Senior High School | Public school | Cape Coast | —N/a |
| Wesley Girls' Senior High School | Public, Wesleyan, all-girls | Cape Coast | Website |
| | Senior high schools in Gomoa District | | |
| Apam Senior High School | Public school | Apam | —N/a |
| Gomoa Senior High School | Technical school | Dawurampon | —N/a |
| Mozano Comm. Senior High School | Commercial school | Mozano | —N/a |
| Mozano Experimental Senior High School | Commercial school | Mozano | —N/a |
| Potsin T.I. Ahmadiya Senior High School | Public school | Potsin | —N/a |
Senior high schools in Komenda/Edina/Eguafo/Abirem District
| Edinaman Secondary School | Public, Boarding | Elmina | —N/a |
| Eguafo-Abrem Senior High School | Public school | Agona Abirem | —N/a |
| Komenda Senior High School | Public school | Komenda | —N/a |
| | Senior high schools in Mfantsiman District | | |
| Ekumfi T. I. Ahmadiiyya Senior High School | Public school | Esakyir | —N/a |
| Kwegyir Aggrey Senior High School | Commercial school | Anomabo | —N/a |
| Mankessim Senior High Technical School | Technical school | Mankesim | —N/a |
| Mfantsiman Girls' Senior High School | Public, all-girls | Saltpond | Website |
| Saltpond Methodist High School | Public school | Saltpond | —N/a |
| | Senior high schools in Twifo/Heman/Lower Denkyira District | | |
| Forever Young Senior High School | Public school | Hemang | —N/a |
| Jukwa Senior High School | Public school | Jukwa | —N/a |
| Twifo Praso Senior High School | Public school | Twifo Praso | —N/a |
| | Senior high schools in Upper Denkyira District | | |
| Boa Amponsem Senior High School | Public school | Dunkwa-On-Offin | —N/a |
| Diaso Senior High School | Public school | Diaso | —N/a |
| Dunkwa Senior High School | Technical school | Dunkwa-On-Offin | —N/a |
| Oxford Senior High School | Public school | Dunkwa-On-Offin | —N/a |
| St. Andrew's College | Public school | Dunkwa-On-Offin | —N/a |

== Eastern Region ==
| School | Type | Location(s) | Website |
|---|---|---|---|
Senior high schools in Achiase District
| Achiase Senior High School | Public school | Achiase | —N/a |
Senior high schools in Akuapim North District and Akuapim South District
Akuapim North District
| Asuom Senior High School | Public school | Akropong | —N/a |
| Benkum Senior High School | Public, Presbyterian | Larteh-Akuapem | —N/a |
| Hark Mount Sinai Senior High School | Public school | Akropong | —N/a |
| Nifa Senior High School (NISEC) | Public school | Adukrom | Website Alumni Website |
| Okuapemman School (OKUASS) | Public, Presbyterian | Akropong | —N/a |
| Presbyterian Senior High School | Public, Presbyterian | Akuapim-Mampong | Website |
| Presbyterian Senior High Technical School | Technical school | Adukrom | —N/a |
Akuapim South District
| Aburi Girls' Senior High School (ABUGISS) | Public, Boarding, all-girls | Aburi | Website |
| Adeiso Senior High School | Public school | Adeiso | —N/a |
| Adonten Senior High School | Public school | Nsawam | —N/a |
| Nsawam Senior High School | Public school | Nsawam | —N/a |
| Nsawam Business College | Commercial school | Nsawam | —N/a |
| Presbyterian Senior High Technical School | Technical school | Aburi | —N/a |
| Presby Senior High Technical School | Technical school | Nsawam | —N/a |
| Saint Martin's Senior High School | Public school | Nsawam-Adoagyiri | —N/a |
Senior high schools in Akyemansa District
| Ayirebi Senior High School- Akyem Ayirebi | Public school | Ofoase | —N/a |
Senior high schools in Asuogyaman District
| Adjena Senior High Technical School | Public school | Akosombo | —N/a |
| Akosombo International School | Private, International | Akosombo | —N/a |
| Akwamuman Senior High School | Public school | Atimpoku | —N/a |
| Anum Presbyterian Senior High School (ANSEC) | Public school | Anum | —N/a |
| Apegusu Senior High School | Public school | Akwamu Apegusu, Atimpoku | —N/a |
| Boso Senior High Technical School (BOSSTECH) | Technical school | Boso, Atimpoku | —N/a |
| Gafad Afonope Senior High School | Public school | Atimpoku | —N/a |
Senior high schools in Atiwa West District
| Kwabeng Anglican Senior High Technical (KASHTS) | Technical, Anglican | Kwabeng | —N/a |
Senior high schools in Birim Central Municipal District and Birim South District
Birim Central Municipal District
| Akroso Senior High School | Public school | Akim Akroso | —N/a |
| Oda Senior High School | Public school | Akim Oda | Website |
Birim South District
| Akim State College | Public school | Akim Swedru | —N/a |
| Akim Swedru Senior High School (AKISSS, ANNUANOM, Star of the East) | Public school | Akim Swedru | Website |
| St. Francis Senior High Technical School (FRANSTECH) | Technical school | Akim Oda | —N/a |
Senior high schools in East Akim Municipal District
| Abuakwa State College | Public school | Kibi | —N/a |
| Asafo Akyem Senior High School | Technical school | Asafo, Kibi | —N/a |
| Christian Heritage Senior High Technical School | Technical school | Kukurantumi, Kibi | —N/a |
| Kibi Senior High Technical School | Technical school | Kibi | —N/a |
| Nero Senior High School | Public school | Kibi | —N/a |
| Ofori Panin Senior High School | Public, Christian | Kukurantumi | |
| Saint Paul Technical School | Technical school | Kukurantumi, Kibi | Website |
| Saint Stephen's Senior High Technical School | Technical school | Asiakwa, Kibi | —N/a |
| Suhum Secondary Technical School | Technical school | Suhum | —N/a |
Senior high schools in Fanteakwa District
| Begoro Presbyterian Senior High School | Public school | Akim Begoro | —N/a |
| Dei Technical Institute | Technical school | Begoro | —N/a |
| Manchester Senior High School | Public school | Begoro | —N/a |
| New Nsutam Senior High School | Public school | Nsutam, Begoro | —N/a |
| Osino Presbyterian Senior High Technical School | Technical school | Osino | —N/a |
Senior high schools in Kwaebibirem District
| Asuom Senior High School | Public school | Asuom | —N/a |
| Kade Senior High-Technical School | Public school | Kade | |
| St Rose's Senior High School | Public, Catholic, all-girls | Akwatia | Website |
Senior high schools in Kwahu South District, Kwahu East District and Kwahu West District
Kwahu South District
| Kwahu Ridge Senior High Technical School | Technical school | Obo Kwahu | —N/a |
| Mpraeso Senior High School (Mpass) | Public school | Mpraeso | —N/a |
Kwahu East District
| Abetifi Presbyterian Senior High School | Public school | Abetifi | —N/a |
| Abetifi Senior High Technical School | Technical school | Abetifi | —N/a |
| Nkwatia Senior High School (NKWASCO) | Public school | Nkwatia Kwahu | —N/a |
| St. Dominics Senior High School | Public school | Pepease | —N/a |
| St. Paul's Senior High School | Public school | Asakraka, Abetifi | —N/a |
| St. Peter's Boys Senior High School | Public, all-boys | Nkwatia Kwahu | —N/a |
Kwahu West District
| Fodoa Community Day Senior High School | Public school | Fodoa | —N/a |
| Nkawkaw Senior High School | Public school | Nkawkaw | —N/a |
Senior high schools in Manya Krobo District
| Akro Senior High Technical School | Technical school | Odumase Krobo | —N/a |
| Akuse Senior High School | Public school | Odumase Krobo | —N/a |
| Asesewa Day Senior High School | Public school | Odumase Krobo | —N/a |
| Asesewa Agriculture Senior High School | Commercial school | Odumase Krobo | —N/a |
| Krobo Girls' Senior High School | Public, all-girls | Odumase Krobo | —N/a |
| Manya Krobo Senior High School | Public school | Odumase Krobo | —N/a |
| Somanya Senior High Technical School (SOTECH) | Technical school | Odumase Krobo | —N/a |
Senior high schools in Suhum/Kraboa/Coaltar District
| Suhum Senior High School | Technical school | Suhum | —N/a |
Senior high schools in New-Juaben Municipal District
| Ghana Senior High School (GHANASS) | Public, Christian | Koforidua | —N/a |
| Koforidua Senior High School (KOSEC) | Public school | Koforidua | —N/a |
| Koforidua Senior High Technical School (KSTS) | Technical, Boarding, Christian | Koforidua | —N/a |
| New-Juaben Senior High Commercial School (NJUASCO) | Public school | Koforidua | Website |
| Oyoko Methodist Senior High School (OMESS) | Public, Methodist | Oyoko | —N/a |
| Peace Hill Senior High School | Private school | Koforidua | —N/a |
| Pentecost Senior High School (PENSEC) | Private school | Koforidua | —N/a |
| Pope John Senior High School and Minor Seminary (POJOSS) | Public, Catholic, all-boys | Effiduase | Website |
| SDA Senior High School (SEDASS) | Public school | Koforidua | —N/a |
| Universal Girls Senior High School (UNIGISS) | Private school | Koforidua | —N/a |
Senior high schools in West Akim Municipal District
| Asamankese Senior High School | Public school | Asamankese | —N/a |
| Lydia Memorial School | Private school | Asamankese | —N/a |
| St. Thomas Senior High School | Public school | Asamankese | —N/a |
Senior high schools in Yilo Krobo District
| Asesewa Senior High School | Public school | Asesewa | —N/a |
| Klo Agogo Senior High School | Public school | Koforidua | —N/a |
| Koforidua Technical Institute | Technical school | Koforidua | —N/a |
| Methodist Girls' High School | Public, Methodist, all-girls | Mamfe-Akuapem, Akuapim North District | —N/a |
| Yilo Krobo Senior High School | Public school | Somanya | —N/a |

== Greater Accra Region ==
| School | Type | Location(s) | Website |
|---|---|---|---|
| Abundant Grace Academy | Private school | Accra | Website |
| Accra Academy | Public, all-boys | Bubuashi, Accra | Website |
| Accra Girls Senior High School | Public, all-girls | Maamobi | —N/a |
| Accra Grammar School | Public school | Accra | Website |
| Accra High School | Public school | Asylum Down | —N/a |
| Accra Technical Training Center (ATTC) | Technical school | Kokomlemle, Accra | Website |
| Achimota School | Boarding school | Accra | Website |
| Alpha Beta Christian College | International school | Accra | Website |
| Al-Rayan International School (ARIS) | International school | Accra | Website |
| American International School of Accra | International school | Accra | Website |
| Armed Forces Senior High Technical School | Technical school | Burma Camp | —N/a |
| Apostle Safo School of Arts and Sciences | Private school | Awoshie | Website |
| Christ International Senior High Secondary School | Christian school | North Taifa, Kwabenya, Accra | —N/a |
| Christian Methodist Senior High School | Public school | New Aplaku, Accra | —N/a |
| Corpus Christi Senior High School | Private school | Accra | Website |
| Danquah International School | International school | Tesano, Accra | Website |
| Dansoman Senior High School | Public school | Dansoman | —N/a |
| Ebenezer Senior High School | Public school | Dansoman | Website |
| Edge Hill Senior High School | Private school | Awoshie | —N/a |
| Faith Montessori School and International College | International school | Accra | Website |
| Ghana International School | Private, International | Accra | Website |
| Ghana-Lebanon Islamic School (GLIS) | Private school | Kwame Nkrumah Circle, Accra | Website |
| Galaxy International School | International school | Accra | Website |
| Holy Trinity Senior High School | Public school | Accra | —N/a |
| Ideal College Senior High School | Private, Adventist | Legon | Website |
| Kaneshie Senior High School | Technical school | Kaneshie | —N/a |
| Kinbu Senior High Technical School | Technical school | Kinbu | —N/a |
| La Presbyterian Senior High School | Public school | Accra | —N/a |
| Labone Senior High School | Public school | Labone | Website |
| Liberty American School (LAS) | Private, International | Accra | Website |
| Lincoln Community School | Private, International | Accra | Website |
| Lycée Français International Jacques Prévert d'Accra | Private, International | East Legon | Website |
| Madina Senior High School | Public school | Madina, Accra | Website |
| Ngleshie Amanfro Senior High School | Public school | Ngleshie Amanfro | —N/a |
| Nungua Senior High School | Public school | Nungua | Website |
| O'Reilly Senior High School | Public, Boarding | Teshie | Website |
| Odorgonno Senior High School | Public school | Awoshie | —N/a |
| Osu Presbyterian Boys' Boarding School | Public, Presbyterian, all-boys | Osu, Accra | —N/a |
| Pank Senior High School | Private school | Awoshie | —N/a |
| Presbyterian Boys' Senior High School | Public, Boarding, all-boys | Legon | Website |
| Presbyterian Senior High School | Public, Presbyterian | Osu, Accra | —N/a |
| Reverend John Teye Memorial Institute | Private, Christian | Ofankor | Website |
| St. Francis Xavier Senior High School | Private, Catholic | Kotobabi | Website |
| St. Margaret Mary Senior High School | Public school | Dansoman | —N/a |
| St. Martin De Porres School | Private, Catholic | Dansoman | Website |
| Saint Mary's Senior High School | Public, Catholic, all-girls | Korle Gonno | —N/a |
| St. Thomas Aquinas Senior High School | Public, all-boys | Cantonments | Website |
| Teshie Presby Senior High School | Public school | Teshie | —N/a |
| Wesley Grammar School | Public school | Dansoman | —N/a |
Senior high schools in Dangme East District and Dangme West Districts (Shai-osudoku & Ningo Prampram)
Dangme East District
| Ada Senior High School | Public school | Ada-Foah | —N/a |
| Ada Senior High Technical School | Technical school | Ada | —N/a |
Shai-Osudoku District & Ningo-Prampram District
| Ghanata Senior High School | Public school | P.O. Box DD 50, Dodowa. Shai-Osudoku District | Website |
| Ningo Senior High School | Public school | Old Ningo | —N/a |
| Osudoku Secondary | Technical school | Asutsuare | —N/a |
| Zion Methodist Secondary Technical School | Technical school | Dawhenya, Dangme West District | —N/a |
Senior high schools in Tema Municipal District
| African Science Academy | Public, all-girls | Tema Community 6 | Website |
| Ashaiman Senior High School | Public school | Ashaiman | —N/a |
| Chemu Senior High School | Public school | Tema Community 4 | —N/a |
| GIU International Christian Academy | International school | Tema | GIU Christian Academy website |
| Manhean Senior High School | Technical school | Tema Manhean | —N/a |
| Our Lady of Mercy Senior High School | Public school | Tema Community 4 | —N/a |
| Presbyterian Senior High School | Public school | Tema | —N/a |
| Saint Stephen's International school | International school | Tema | —N/a |
| SOS-Hermann Gmeiner International College | International school | Tema | Website |
| Tema International School | Private, Boarding, International | Tema | Website |
| Tema Methodist Day Senior High School | Public school | Tema | —N/a |
| Tema Senior High School | Public school | Tema Community 5 | —N/a |
| Witsands International Senior High School | International school | Tema | —N/a |
Senior high schools in Ga East District and Ga West District
Ga East District
| Action Senior High & Technical School | Technical school | Madina | —N/a |
| Madina Senior High School | Public school | Madina | Website |
| St. Peter's Mission Schools | Private, International | East Legon | Website |
| West Africa Senior High School | Public school | Adenta | Website |
Ga West District
| Amasaman Senior High School | Technical school | Amasaman | —N/a |
| Crystal Heights International School | International school | Amasaman | Website |
| Haavad's Senior High School | Public school | Amasaman | —N/a |
| Torkuase Senior High School | Public school | Torkuase | —N/a |
| Wadud Senior High School | Public school | Amasaman | —N/a |

== Northern Region ==
| School | Type | Location(s) | Website |
|---|---|---|---|
Senior high schools in East Gonja District
| Salaga Senior High School | Public school | Salaga | —N/a |
| Salaga T.I Amadiyya Senior High School | Public school | Salaga | —N/a |
Senior high schools in East Mamprusi District
| Gambaga Girls Senior High School | Public, all-girls | Gambaga | —N/a |
| Nalerigu Secondary School | Public school | Nalerigu | —N/a |
| Nalerigu Youth Leadership Vocational Training Centre | Public school | Nalerigu | —N/a |
Senior high schools in West Mamprusi District
| Excellence Senior High School | Private school | Jaagbanni | —N/a |
| Glorious Step Senior High School | Private school | Kukuaazugu | —N/a |
| Marakaz Islamic Senior High School | Private, Islamic | Walewale, | —N/a |
| Saboba E. P Senior High School (EPSEC) | Public school | Saboba | —N/a |
| St. Joseph's Senior High Technical School (SABTECH) | Technical school | Saboba | —N/a |
| Walewale Senior High Technical School (WALSECTEC) | Technical school | Walewale | —N/a |
| Walewale Vocational/Technical School Institute (WALVOC) | Technical school | Walewale | —N/a |
Senior high schools in Karaga District
| Karaga Senior High School | Public school | Karaga District | —N/a |
Senior high schools in Nanumba North Municipal District
| Bimbilla Senior High School | Public school | Bimbilla | —N/a |
Senior high schools in Savelugu-Nanton District
| Nanton Senior High/Technical School | Public school | Nanton | —N/a |
| Pong-Tamale Senior High School | Public school | Pong-Tamale | —N/a |
| Savelugu Senior High School | Public school | Savelugu | —N/a |
Senior high schools in Tamale Municipal District
| Anbariya Senior High School (Anbariya) | Islamic School | Tamale | —N/a |
| Business Senior High School | Public school | Tamale | —N/a |
| Dabokpa Technical Institute | Technical school | Tamale | —N/a |
| Ghana Senior High School (GHANASCO) | Public school | Tamale | —N/a |
| Kalpohin Senior High School | Public school | Tamale | —N/a |
| Lamhegu Technical Institute | Technical school | Tamale | —N/a |
| Northern School of Business | Public school | Tamale | —N/a |
| Nuriya Islamic Senior High School | Public, Islamic | Tamale | —N/a |
| Nuriyya Islamic Institute | Public, Islamic | Tamale | —N/a |
| St. Charles Senior High School | Public school | Tamale | —N/a |
| Tamale Girls' Senior High School | Public, all-girls | Tamale | —N/a |
| Tamale Islamic Science Senior High School | Public, Boarding, Islamic | Tamale | —N/a |
| Tamale Senior High School (Tamasco) | Public, Boarding | Tamale | —N/a |
| Vitting Senior High School Technical | Public School | Tamale | |
Senior high schools in Tolon/Kumbungu District
| Kasuliyili Senior High School | Public school | Kasuliyili | —N/a |
| Kofi Annan Technical Institute | Technical school | Nwodua | —N/a |
| Kumbungu Senior High School | Public school | Kumbungu | —N/a |
| Kumbungu Vocational Technical Institute | Technical school | Kumbungu | —N/a |
| Tolon Senior High School | Public school | Tolon | —N/a |
| Zugu Dabogni Technical Institute | Public school | Zugu Dabogu | —N/a |
Senior high schools in West Gonja District
| Bole Senior High School | Public school | Bole | —N/a |
| Damongo Senior High School | Public school | Damongo | —N/a |
| Ndewura Jakpa Senior High Technical School | Technical school | Damongo | —N/a |
Senior high schools in Yendi District
| Dagbon State Senior High Technical School | Technical school | Yendi | —N/a |
| Yendi Senior High School | Public school | Yendi | —N/a |
Senior high schools in Kpandai District
| Nawuriman Senior High School | Private school | Balai | —N/a |
Senior high schools in Zabzugu/Tatale District
| Business College International | Private school | Tamale | —N/a |
| Tatale EP Senior High Technical School | Technical school | Tatale | —N/a |
| Zabzugu Senior High School | Public, Boarding | Zabzugu | —N/a |
^{1}

== Oti Region ==
| School | Type | Location(s) | Website |
|---|---|---|---|
Senior high schools in Jasikan District
| Baglo Senior High School | Technical school | Baglo | —N/a |
| Bueman Senior High School | Public school | Jasikan | —N/a |
| Nkonya Senior High School | Public school | Nkonya | —N/a |
| Nattan Senior High School | Public school | Nkonya | —N/a |
| Okadjakrom Senior High School | Technical school | Okadjakrom | —N/a |
| Worawora Secondary | Public school | Worawora | —N/a |
Senior high schools in Kadjebi District
| Ahamansu Islamic Senior High School | Public, Islamic | Ahamansu | —N/a |
| Dodi-Papase Comm. Senior High School | Commercial school | Dodi Papase | —N/a |
| Kadjebi-Asato Senior High School | Public school | Kadjeto-Asato | —N/a |
Senior high schools in Krachi District and Krachi East District
| Asukawkaw Senior High School | Public school | Asukawkaw | —N/a |
| Kete-Krachi Senior High School | Public school | Kete-Krachi | —N/a |
| Kpassa Senior High School | Public school | Kpassa | —N/a |
| Krachi Senior High School | Public school | Kete-Krachi | —N/a |
| Ntruboman Senior High School | Public school | Brewaniase | —N/a |
| Oti Senior High School | Technical school | Dambai | —N/a |
Senior high schools in Nkwanta District
| Nkwanta Senior High School | Public school | Nkwanta | —N/a |
^{1}

== Savannah Region ==
| School | Type | Location(s) | Website |
|---|---|---|---|
Senior high schools in Sawla-Tuna-Kalba District
| Sawla Senior High School | Public, Boarding | Sawla | —N/a |

== Upper East Region ==
| School | Type | Location(s) | Website |
|---|---|---|---|
Senior high schools in Bawku Municipal District and Bawku West District
Bawku Municipal District
| Bawku Senior High School | Public school | Bawku | —N/a |
| Bawku Senior High/Technical School | Technical school | Bawku | —N/a |
| Bawku Technical Institute | Technical school | Bawku | —N/a |
Bawku West District
| Zebilla Senior High School | Public school | Zebilla | —N/a |
Senior high schools in Bolgatanga Municipal District
| Bolgatanga Girls Senior High School (BOGISS) | Public, all-girls | Bolgatanga | —N/a |
| Bolgatanga Senior High School | Public school | Winkogo | —N/a |
| Bolgatanga Technical Institute (BOTECH) | Commercial, Technical | Bolgatanga | —N/a |
| Bolgatanga Technical College | Technical school | Yikene | —N/a |
| Gowrie Senior High Technical School | Technical school | Gowrie | —N/a |
| Ho School of Business | Commercial school | Bolgatanga | —N/a |
| Zuarungu Senior High School (ZUSS) | Public school | Zuarungu | —N/a |
| Zamse Senior High Technical School (ZAMSTECH) | Technical school | Bolgatanga | —N/a |
Senior high schools in Bongo District
| Bongo Senior High School | Public school | Bongo | —N/a |
Senior high schools in Builsa District
| Fumbisi Senior High School | Public school | Fumbisi, Builsa District | —N/a |
| Sandema Senior High Technical School | Technical school | Sandema | —N/a |
| Sandema Senior High School | Public school | Sandema | —N/a |
Senior high schools in Garu-Tempane District
| Garu/Tempane Senior High School | Public school | Tempane | —N/a |
Senior high schools in Kassena/Nankana District
| Chiana Senior High School | Public school | Chiana | —N/a |
| Mirigu Senior High School | Public school | Mirigu | —N/a |
| Navrongo Senior High School | Public school | Navrongo | —N/a |
| Notre Dame Seminary Senior High School | Public, all-boys | Navrongo | —N/a |
Senior high schools in Talensi-Nabdam District
| Kongo Senior High School | Public school | Kongo | —N/a |
| Tongo Senior High School | Public school | Tongo | —N/a |
^{2}

== Upper West Region ==
| School | Type | Location(s) | Website |
|---|---|---|---|
Senior high schools in Wa
| Ahmadiyya Senior High School | Islamic school | Wa | —N/a |
| Lassia-Tuolu Senior High School | Public, Catholic | Wa | —N/a |
| Pinna Senior High School | Public school | Wa | —N/a |
| St. Francis Xavier Minor Seminary | Public, Catholic, Boarding, all-boys | Wa | —N/a |
| Tumu Senior High Technical School | Public school | Tumu | —N/a |
| Wa Islamic Senior High School | Islamic school | Wa | —N/a |
| Wa Senior High School | Public school | Wa | —N/a |
| Wa Senior High Technical School | Technical, Boarding | Wa | —N/a |
| Wa Technical Institute | Technical school | Wa | —N/a |
Senior high schools in Jirapa District
| Jirapa Senior High School | Public school | Jirapa, Ghana | —N/a |
| Kanton Senior High School | Public school | Tumu | —N/a |
| St. Francis Girls' Senior High School | Public, Catholic, all-girls | Jirapa, Ghana | —N/a |
| Ullo Senior High School | Public school | Jirapa, Ghana | —N/a |
Senior high schools in Lawra District
| Eremon Senior High School | Technical school | Lawra | —N/a |
| Lawra Senior High School | Public school | Lawra | —N/a |
Senior high schools in Lawra-Nandom
| Holy Family Senior High School | Public school | Hamile | —N/a |
| Ko Senior High School | Public school | Nandom | —N/a |
| Nandom Senior High School | Private, Catholic, all-boys | Nandom | —N/a |
Senior high schools in Nadowli
| Brifor Senior High School | Public school | Babile | —N/a |
| Queen of Peace Senior High School | Public school | Nadowli | —N/a |
^{3}

== Volta Region ==
| School | Type | Location(s) | Website |
|---|---|---|---|
Senior high schools in Adaklu District
| Adaklu Comm. Senior High School | Commercial school | Adaklu | —N/a |
| Adaklu Senior High School | Public school | Adaklu Waya | —N/a |
Senior high schools in Agotime Ziope District
| Ziope Senior High School | Public school | Agotime Ziope | —N/a |
Senior high schools in Akatsi North District
| Ave Senior High School | Public school | Ave-Dakpa | —N/a |
Senior high schools in Akatsi South District
| Akatsi Senior High School | Technical school | Akatsi | —N/a |
| Wovenu Senior Senior High School | Public school | Tadzewu | —N/a |
Central Tongu District
| Adidome Senior High School | Public school | Adidome | Website |
| Mafi-Kumase Senior High School | Public school | Mafi-Kumase | |
Senior high schools in Ho Municipal District
| Abutia Senior High School | Public school | Abutia-Teti | —N/a |
| Agotime Senior High School | Public school | Kpetoe | —N/a |
| Akome Senior High School | Technical school | Akome | |
| Avatime Senior High School | Public school | Vane, Ho Municipal District | —N/a |
| Awudome Senior High School (AWUSCO) | Public school | Tsito | Website |
| Baglo Senior High School | Technical school | Ho | —N/a |
| Dzolo Senior High School | Public school | Dzolo | —N/a |
| E.P. Church Mawuko Girls Senior High School | Public, Presbyterian, all-girls | Ho | —N/a |
| Ideal College | Public school | Ho | —N/a |
| Kpedze Senior High School | Public school | Kpedze | —N/a |
| Mawuli School | Public, Boarding, Presbyterian | Ho | www.mawulian.org |
| OLA Girls Senior High School | Public, all-girls | Ho | —N/a |
| Saint Prosper's College | Public school | Ho | —N/a |
| Sedzordzi Shaker Anthony's School Complex | Commercial school | Ho | —N/a |
| Star Senior High School | Private school | Ho | —N/a |
| Taviefe Comm. Senior High School | Commercial school | Taviefe | —N/a |
| Tsito Senior High School | Technical school | Tsito | —N/a |
| Wallahs Academy Senior High School | Private school | Ho | wallahsacademy.com |
Senior high schools in Hohoe District
| Afadjato Senior High School | Technical school | Gbledi-Agbogame | —N/a |
| Agate Comm. Senior High School | Commercial school | Agate | —N/a |
| Akpafu Senior High School | Technical school | Akpafu | —N/a |
| Alavanyo Senior High School | Technical school | Alavanyo | —N/a |
| E. P. Senior High School | Public school | Hohoe | —N/a |
| Jim Bourton Memorial Agriculture Senior High School | Commercial school | Logba Adzekoe | —N/a |
| Leklebi Senior High School | Public school | Leklebi | —N/a |
| Likpe Senior High School | Public school | Likpe-Mate | —N/a |
| St. Mary's Seminary/Senior High School | Public, all-boys | Lolobi | —N/a |
| Ve Comm. Senior High School | Commercial school | Ve-Koloenu | —N/a |
Senior high schools in Keta District
| Abor Senior High School | Public school | Abor | —N/a |
| Anlo Technical Institute (ANTECH) | Technical school | Anloga | —N/a |
| Anlo Afiadenyigba Senior High School | Public school | Anlo Afiadenyigba | —N/a |
| Anlo Awomefia Senior Senior High School | Public school | Anyako | —N/a |
| Anlo Senior High School (ANSECO) | Public school | Anloga | —N/a |
| Anyako Senior High School | Public school | Anyako | —N/a |
| Atiavi Senior High School | Technical school | Atiavi | —N/a |
| Keta Business College | Commercial school | Keta | —N/a |
| Keta Senior High Technical School | Technical school | Keta | Ketasco |
| Zion College (ZICO) | Public school | Anloga | —N/a |
Senior high schools in Ketu North Municipal District
| Dzodze Penyi Senior High School | Public school | Dzodze | —N/a |
Senior high schools in Ketu South Municipal District
| Klikor Senior High School | Technical school | Klikor | —N/a |
| St. Paul's Senior High School | Public, Catholic, all-boys | Hatsukope/Aflao | —N/a |
| Some Senior High School | Public school | Agbozume | —N/a |
| Three Town Senior High School | Public school | Denu | —N/a |
Senior high schools in Kpando District
| Anfoega Senior High School | Public school | Anfoega | —N/a |
| Bishop Herman College | Public, all-boys | Kpandu | —N/a |
| Have Senior High School | Technical school | Have, Kpando District | —N/a |
| Kpando Senior High School | Public school | Kpando | —N/a |
| Vakpo Senior High School | Public school | Vakpo | —N/a |
| Vakpo Senior High Technical School | Technical school | Vakpo | —N/a |
Senior high schools in South Dayi District
| Kpeve Senior High School | Technical school | Kpeve | —N/a |
| Peki Senior High School | Public school | Peki | —N/a |
| Peki Senior High Technical School | Technical school | Peki | —N/a |
| Tongor Senior High Technical School | Technical school | Tongor Tsanakpe | —N/a |
North Tongu District
| Aveyime Battor Senior High School | Technical school | Aveyime-Battor | —N/a |
| Dofor Comm. Agricultural Senior High School | Commercial school | Podoe | —N/a |
| Mafi Kumase Senior High Technical School | Technical school | Mafi-Kumasi | —N/a |
| Mafi-Kumasi Comm. Senior High School | Commercial school | Mafi-Kumasi | —N/a |
| St. Kizito Senior High School | Technical school | Mepe | —N/a |
South Tongu District
| Comboni Technical School (COMBOTECH) | Public school | Sogakope | —N/a |
| Dabala Senior High School | Technical school | Dabala | —N/a |
| Sogakope Senior High School (SOGASCO) | Public school | Sogakope | —N/a |

== Western Region ==
| School | Type | Location(s) | Website |
|---|---|---|---|
Senior high schools in Tarkwa-Nsuaem Municipal District
| Fiaseman Senior High School | Public school | Tarkwa | —N/a |
| Tarkwa Senior High School | Public school | Tarkwa | —N/a |
Senior high schools in Prestea Huni Valley Municipal
| Huni Valley Senior High School | Public school | Huni Valley | —N/a |
| Prestea Senior High Technical School (Prestech) | Technical school | Prestea | —N/a |
| St. Augustine's Senior High School | Public, Catholic | Bogoso | Website |
Senior high schools in Wasa Amenfi East District and Wasa Amenfi West District
| Asankrangwa Senior High School (ASANC0) | Public school | Asankrangwa, Wasa Amenfi East District | —N/a |
| Asankrangwa Senior High Technical School (ASECTECH) | Technical school | Asankrangwa, Wasa Amenfi East District | —N/a |
| Amenfiman Senior High School | Public school | Wassa Akropong, Wasa Amenfi West District | —N/a |
| Genesis Senior High School | Public school | Manso Amenfi, Wasa Amenfi West District | —N/a |
Senior high schools in Jomoro District
| Annor Agyei Senior High School | Public school | Shama | —N/a |
| Half Assini Senior High School | Public school | Half Assini | —N/a |
| Ming Daw Senior High School (MINGDAWSCO) | Public school | Shama | —N/a |
| Shama Senior High School | Public school | Shama | —N/a |
Senior high schools in Ellembelle District
| Bonzo Kaku Senior High School | Public school | Awiebo | —N/a |
| Esiama Senior High Technical School | Public school | Esiama | —N/a |
| Kikam Technical Institute | Public school | Kikam | —N/a |
| Nkroful Agricultural Senior High School | Public school | Nkroful | —N/a |
| Uthman Bin Affan Islamic Senior High School | Public school | Kamgbunli | —N/a |
Senior high schools in Nzema East District
| Axim Girls Senior High School | Public, all-girls | Axim | —N/a |
| Nsein Senior High School | Public school | Axim | —N/a |
Senior high schools in Ahanta West District
| Baidoo Bonsoe Senior High Technical School | Public school | Agona Nkwanta | —N/a |
| St. Mary's Boys' School | Boarding, all-boys; Robert Mugabe's alma mater | Apowa | —N/a |
Senior high schools in Mpohor/Wassa East District
| Daboase Senior High Technical School | Technical school | Daboase, Mpohor/Wassa East District | —N/a |
| Mpohor Senior High School | Public school | Mpohor, Mpohor/Wassa East District | —N/a |
Senior high schools in Sekondi Takoradi Metropolitan
| Ahantaman Girls Senior High School | Public, all-girls | Ketan | —N/a |
| Adiembra Senior High School | Technical school | Adiembra, Sekondi Takoradi Metropolitan | —N/a |
| Archbishop Porter Girls' Senior High School | Public, Catholic, all-girls | Sekondi | Website |
| Bompeh Senior High Technical School | Technical school | Takoradi | —N/a |
| Diabene Senior High Technical School | Public school | Diabene Krom, Sekondi | —N/a |
| Fijai Senior High School | Public school | Fijai | —N/a |
| Ghana Senior High Technical School | Public, all-boys | Takoradi | —N/a |
| Methodist Senior High School | Commercial school | Sekondi | —N/a |
| St. John's School | Public, Catholic, all-boys | Sekondi | —N/a |
| Sekondi College (SEKCO) | Public school | Sekondi | —N/a |
| Takoradi Senior High School (TADISCO) | Public school | Takoradi | —N/a |
| Takoradi Technical Institute | Technical school | Takoradi | —N/a |
^{1}

== Western North Region ==
| School | Type | Location(s) | Website |
Senior high schools in Bia West District
| Adjoafua Community Day Senior High School (ADSEC) | Public school | Adjoafua | —N/a |
Senior high schools in Bibiani/Anhwiaso/Bekwai District
| Bibiani Senior High Technical School | Technical school | Bibiani | —N/a |
| Sefwi Bekwai Senior High School](SEBES) | Public school | Sefwi Bekwai | SEBES |
| Wadud Senior High School (WASEC) | Public school | Sefwi Bekwai | —N/a |
Senior high schools in Sefwi Wiawso Municipal District
| Sefwi Wiawso Senior High School (SEWASS) | Public school | Sefwi Wiawso | —N/a |
^{1}

== See also ==
- Education in Ghana
- List of schools in Ghana

== Sources and external links ==
- Complete Ghana School List (Includes Universities and Colleges)
- Ministry of Education of Ghana:Senior Secondary Schools
- School mapping & monitoring portal (Ghana Education Service, Ministry of Education, Ghana)
