= LFIA =

LFIA may refer to:

- Lycée Français International d'Anvers
- Lycée Français International Jacques Prévert d'Accra
- Lateral Flow Immunoassay
