= Manhean Senior High School =

Manhean Senior High/Technical School

Location
- Tema Manhean; Greater Accra Region; Tema; Ghana
- Coordinates: 5.571057°N 0.249440°E

Information
- School type: Public High School coeducational
- Established: 1991
- Status: active
- Oversight: Ministry of Education
- School code: 205060004
- Head teacher: Emmanuel Kobina Baidoo
- Gender: Unisex
- Age: 14 to 20
- Classes offered: Visual Arts, Agricultural Science, General Arts, Technical and Home Economics
- Affiliation: Ghana

Manhean Senior High/Technical School is a coeducational second-cycle institution in Ghana, established in 1991.

Details of Manhean Senior High School
Year of establishment	1991
Motto	Honesty and Service
Short name	MANSECTEC
Location	Manhean, Tema
Category	C

== Courses ==
The school offers courses in Visual Arts, Agricultural Science, General Arts, Technical and Home Economics.
