= Huni Valley Senior High School =

Huni Valley Senior High School Founder. = Dr Anthony Kwesi Appiah
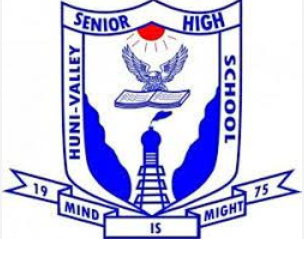

Location
- Huni Valley, Western Region; Ghana
- 5.4696683°N 1.9051883°W

Information
- Type: Public high school
- Motto: Mind is Might (French: L'esprit est la puissance)
- Established: 1975 (51 years ago)
- Status: Active
- School district: Prestea-Huni Valley District
- Oversight: Ministry of Education
- Head teacher: Daniel Kwabena Aidoo
- Gender: Mixed
- Age: 14 to 18
- Classes offered: Business, general arts, general science, home economics and agriculture
- Houses: Enimil Kumah, Aubynn, Bosomtwe and Appiah
- Nickname: Gyeatuo

Huni Valley Senior High School is a coeducational second-cycle institution in Huni Valley in the Western Region of Ghana.

== History ==
The school was established in November 1975 by Dr Anthony Kwesi Appiah who hailed from Huni Valley . It is located in the Prestea Huni Valley Municipal district in the Western Region. The school was established to serve residents in the community and its nearby towns whose main occupation is farming and mining.

The school is located in the Bosomtwi Traditional Area. It has been a developing partner of the school. The Bosomtwi Traditional Authority did assist the school by providing land for its present location. The Traditional Authority also provides accommodation to the staff of the school.

The school runs five major programs mainly Business, General Arts, General Science, General Agriculture, and Home Economics. The school runs both day and boarding systems with boarding facilities for students from far communities. Students sit for the West African Senior Secondary Certificate Examination (WASSCE), an external exam that gets you admission into any tertiary institution of your choice after Senior High School. The school colors are white and blue.

The Past students of the school are referred to as Gyeatuo a word in the Akan language which means to take a bullet, in a contextual sense meaning to be Brave.

== Facilities ==
The school currently has nineteen (19) classroom blocks with a six (6) unit classroom block, sponsored by their P.T.A. There is also a twelve (12) unit classroom block sponsored by GetFund. The school has four (4) laboratories that is Physics, Chemistry, Biology to aid with science projects and activities and Computer lab for I.C.T related activities.

Apart from these there are on-going projects which include a boys dormitory, a girls dormitory, also sponsored by GETFund

For Sporting activities, the school has a standard field for soccer and athletics as well as a volleyball court.

== Major achievements ==
SSCE: In 2005 the school had 100% pass in the Senior Secondary School Examinations.

WASSCE: In 2006 it achieved a pass 97% after the exams and in 2011, 100% by its students.

== Co-curricula activities ==
The school has the following clubs and religious groups

i. Geography club

ii. Cadet Corp

iii. Civic club

iv. School Choir

v. Religious groups; GHAMSU/Scripture Union (SU), PENSA etc.

== See also ==
- Education in Ghana
- List of senior high schools in Ghana
