= Kumasi Senior High Technical School =

Public Senior High School in Ashanti Region, Ghana

- Animuonyamfo

Location
- Patasi; Ghana
- Coordinates: 6°40′52″N 1°38′36″W

Information
- Type: Public Category C senior high technical school
- Motto: Recapturing True Values
- Established: 1991
- Headmaster: Andrews Boateng
- Grades: Form 1–3
- Gender: Mixed
- Colour: White, Green & Yellow
- Nickname: School of Choice

Kumasi Senior High Technical School (KSTS or KSHTS; Animuonyamfo) is a public Category C mixed (co-educational) day and boarding senior high school in Patasi, a suburb of Kumasi in the Ashanti Region of Ghana. Founded in 1991 as part of Ghana's educational reforms, the school operates under the double-track system and focuses on technical and vocational education and training to provide practical skills for national development.

The school's motto is "Recapturing True Values", emphasising holistic development and technical proficiency.

== Disambiguation ==
For clarity it is essential to distinguish Kumasi Senior High Technical Schoolfrom two other prominent institutions in Kumasi with similar names:

- Kumasi Technical Institute (KTI): This is a separate second-cycle technical school established in September 1976 through a collaboration between the Government of Ghana and the Canadian International Development Agency. Academic activities at KTI commenced in January 1977.
- Kumasi Technical University (KsTU): This is a tertiary institution that originated as a different Kumasi Technical Institute in 1954 to offer craft courses. It was converted into a polytechnic in 1963 and subsequently elevated to university status.

== History ==
KSTS was established in 1991 as Kumasi Secondary Technical School, one of 146 senior secondary schools created nationwide during the 1991 Educational Reform Programme to promote science, technology, and vocational training. It was renamed Kumasi Senior High Technical School around 2008.

Milestones:

- 2020: Commissioning of an 18-unit classroom block under the government's infrastructure project.
- 2022: First participation in the National Science and Maths Quiz.
- 2025: Advanced to the 1/8 stage of NSMQ; received GHS 2,400 from Prudential Life Ghana for a perfect Problem of the Day score (9/10 in quarterfinals).

== Academics ==
KSTS follows the three-year Ghana Education Service curriculum with an emphasis on technical and vocational education and training.

Programme	Focus Areas
General Science	Biology, Chemistry, Physics, Elective Mathematics, Technical Drawing
General Arts	Government, History, Literature, Twi
Business	Accounting, Economics, Elective Mathematics
Visual Arts	Graphic Design, Painting, Ceramics
Home Economics	Food and Nutrition, Management in Living, Clothing and Textiles, and General Knowledge in Arts (GKA)
Technical Studies	Building & Construction, Woodwork, Metal Work, Electrical, and Mechanical

Innovative methods include flipped classrooms and computer tutorials.

== Facilities ==
- 18-unit classroom block (2020)
- Science and technical and vocational education and training laboratories
- Dormitories
- Library, ICT centre
- Sports fields

== Extracurricular activities ==
- Sports: football, athletics, volleyball
- Clubs: debate, STEM, environmental
- Competitions: NSMQ participation, debate participation and regional sports achievements
- Achievements: NSMQ progress; regional sports wins

== Community engagement ==
Partnerships include environmental projects and local assemblies.

=== Sustainable Technology Initiatives ===
A defining feature of the KSTS campus is its commitment to sustainable and clean energy. The school has constructed a biogas septic tank designed to supply its main kitchen with clean-burning gas. This project aims to phase out the use of traditional fuels like firewood and charcoal, which the school leadership identified as less hygienic and economical. This biogas initiative is more than an infrastructural upgrade; it is a practical application of the school's technical focus. The school's mission statement in the Clean Cooking Alliance directory explicitly includes promoting the use of biogas and clean cookstoves. This initiative transforms the campus into a "living laboratory" where students in technical programs can engage directly with renewable energy systems. The school has stated its intention to leverage its technical expertise to assist in the production and distribution of clean cookstoves, thereby linking its curriculum directly to tangible environmental and community benefits. This integrated approach provides students with hands-on experience in a real-world setting, reinforcing their theoretical knowledge with practical problem-solving skills.
