= Fiaseman Senior High School =

Public Senior High School in Tarkwa, Ghana

Coordinates: 5.267°N 2.008°W

Fiaseman Senior High
- Tarkwa; Ghana

Information
- Type: Public high school
- Established: 1955; 71 years ago
- Colors: Pink and blue
- Nickname: Fiasec

Fiaseman Senior High School (often called FIASEC) is a public secondary school in Tarkwa, in the Western Region of Ghana. It is a mixed school, meaning both boys and girls attend.

== History ==
Fiaseman Senior High School was started in 1955 by Mr. Jonathan Pra Kofi Ainoo. At first, it was a secretarial school with only 16 students and 2 teachers. Later, it changed into a secondary commercial school called Royal Secondary Commercial School in 1967.

In 1974, the government added it to the public school system. The school changed its name to Fiaseman Secondary School in 1977 after an agreement with the Wassa Fiase Traditional Council.

In 2005, the school marked its 50th anniversary. At that time, it had about 1,300 students — 600 boys and 700 girls.

== Academics ==
The school offers different academic programs. These include General Arts, General Science, Business, Visual Arts, Agricultural Science, and Home Economics. Students study for the West African Senior School Certificate Examination (WASSCE).

== ICT and infrastructure ==
In 2022, Second Lieutenant Dennis Duku, a former student and now a U.S. Army officer, donated 50 new computers to the school. The computers had Intel i5 processors, 8GB RAM, and 500GB hard drives. This was to help students learn ICT better.

The same year, another organization also donated 50 computers to improve teaching and learning.

== Competitions ==
It has taken part in the National Science and Maths Quiz (NSMQ), a famous quiz in Ghana. In 2021, they reached the one-eighth stage after scoring 35 points in the regional competition. In 2022, they again qualified for the national stage 6.

== Sports ==
In November 2018, Fiaseman SHS won the Goldfields 25th Anniversary Football Gala by beating Tarkwa Senior High (Tarsco) 4–2 on penalties after drawing 1–1 in the final. The tournament was to promote peace and teamwork among schools in the area.

== Community support ==
In 2022, Gold Fields Ghana helped the school by solving its water problem.

The Member of Parliament for Tarkwa-Nsuaem, George Mireku Duker, in 2022; built a boys’ dormitory via GETfund at Fiaseman Senior High School. The dormitory cost GH¢2.7 million and has 480 beds.

== See also ==
- List of senior high schools in Ghana
- Education in Ghana
