= Action Senior High & Technical School =

Action Progressive Institute

Location
- Accra; Ghana; 5.665671°N 0.164889°W

Information
- Established: 2000

Action Progressive Institute, also known as Action Secondary Technical School and Action Senior High School, is an educational institution for secondary and technical education located in Madina Estate in the Greater Accra Region, Ghana.

== See also ==
- List of schools in Ghana
- List of senior secondary schools in Ghana
