= Lassia-Tuolu Senior High School =

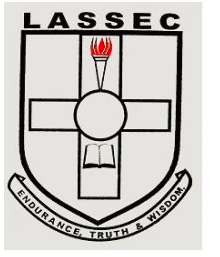
- Wa; Upper West Region; P. O. Box 433; Ghana

Information
- Type: Public Secondary/High School
- Motto: 'Endurance, truth, and wisdom'
- Established: 1995; 31 years ago
- School district: Wa West District
- Head of school: Rev. Mathew Tuurosong
- Affiliation: Catholic Church

Lassia-Tuolu Senior High School, (founded in 1995) is located in the Western part of Wa in the Upper West Region of Ghana. Lassia-Tuolu Senior High school was originally named, St. Ignatius of Loyola Senior High school. Found in a community called Lassia-Tuolu, the school was nicknamed after it. Lassia-Tuolu Senior High School is a mixed sex catholic school with great academic merits and popularity in the Upper West Region. With their motto, Endurance, Truth, and Wisdom, Lassia-Tuolu Senor High school has attained great successes from 1995 till date.

== History ==
The school was established on 3 March 1995 by a Catholic church with Archbishop Emeritus Gregory Kpiebaya who was the Bishop of Wa in the 1980s. The initial idea was from the chief of Jenebob at that time to cater for the educational need of the youth in that locality. With financial support from a parish in Germany called St. Otger and its representative, Bernhard Nitschke, the construction work was started in 1992.The school finally started on 3 March 1995 with one hundred and twenty students (120) comprising 80 boys and 40 girls. This was the first time the Upper West Region had a mixed catholic school. The school was formally captured into the public system in 1997. The continuous support of the Parent-Teacher Association (P.T.A) in providing the students with three meals a day helped the school to enroll students in the boarding house from 1997. Currently, the school has a population of about thousand students and a staff of 70.

== Vision ==
As a catholic educational institution that is inspired by the distinguished example of our lord Jesus Christ, who came to serve but not to be served, Lassia-Tuolu senior high desires to have well educated and trained youth who are self-disciplined, based on sound Christian morals for their own benefit and for the nation.

== Mission ==
To Produce Intelligent, Self-Disciplined and Resourceful People Through Quality Education and Christian Moral Training Who Will Give Off Their Best to Society.

== Motto ==
Endurance, Truth, and Wisdom.

== Location ==
The school is found between Dorimon and Tanduori in the Wa West District of Ghana. Though the location of Lassia-Tuolu has not been captured in the Global Positioning System yet, Dorimon and Tanduori can help find the location of the school. It has a position of longitude 40N to 245N and latitude 9W to 32W.location of Lassia

== Houses ==
The school has four houses which are Bill Curran, Bernhard Nitscke, Joseph Yieleh Chireh, and Kpan House respectively. These houses were named after people who contributed to the success of the school in several ways.

- Rev. Bill Curran was the parish priest of Lassia-Tuolu who mobilized funds from friends outside the country to support Archbishop Emeritus Gregory Kpiebaya to establish the school. Due to his indispensable help to the school, the first house was named after him as a sign of acknowledgement. Bill Curran house is identified with yellow as their colour.
- Bernhard Nitschke was also a man from Germany who served as the fundraising manager for the school building project. He helped raise funds to build the old dining hall, the library, dormitories and old classrooms. In order to appreciate his efforts, house two was named after him. House two has always been identified with colour green.
- Joseph Yieleh Chireh is the current Member of Parliament for the Wa West District. He also played a significant role in the establishment of the school after he was elected as the member of Parliament for Wa West District. He helped in the funding process. He also donated a photocopier machine to the school and financed the building of the new library. So, house three was named after him to honour his good works. Yieleh Chireh house is identified with blue colour.
- Mr Andrew Kpan, who was the first headmaster of St. Ignatius of Loyola Senior high school from 1995 to 2005 was also acknowledged by naming the fourth house in his name. The last house, Andrew Kpan house represents the Purple Color.

== Learning Environment ==
Since the school is located in a very remote area, there is serenity and less of distractions during learning. Aside from the fact that other factors cause disruption of classes and effective learning, the quiet nature and the isolated geographical area of the school is perfect for studies. The factors that hinder conducive studies are the water shortages, inconsistent electricity supply and few teachers for a subject. There are times the whole school with a population of over 1000 students rely on a borehole for water. This disrupted classes a lot especially for the first years because they had to go to the nearby village to get water and come back after very long hours. Subjects like Geography and Chemistry had only one teacher teaching the entire student body offering those courses. This puts pressure on the teachers and the students causing a reduction in their academic performance.

== Courses Offered ==
- General Arts
- General Science
- Home Economics

== Achievements ==
- Maintaining high academic performance since 1995
- Reduction of school debt through prudent financial management
- Maintaining high standard of discipline among students and staff
- Reaching the Quarter Finals in the prestigious National Science and Maths Quiz

== Principals and Heads ==
- Mr. Andrew Kpan (1995-2005)
- Rev. Fr Linus Mwinlaaro (2005-2010)
- Rev. Fr Mathew Tuurosung (2010 till 2019)
- Mr. Emmanuel Banongwie (2019 till date)

== Facilities ==
- Classrooms
- Computer Laboratory
- Library
- Science Laboratory

== Gallery ==
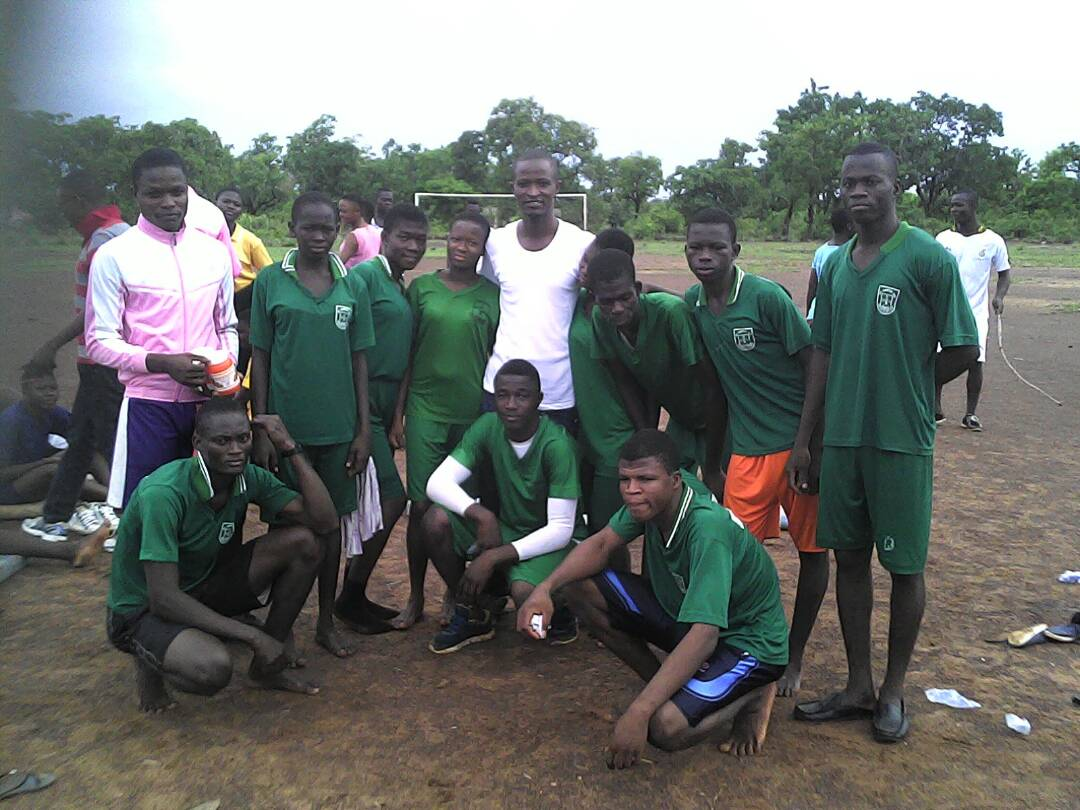
House two students with their house master

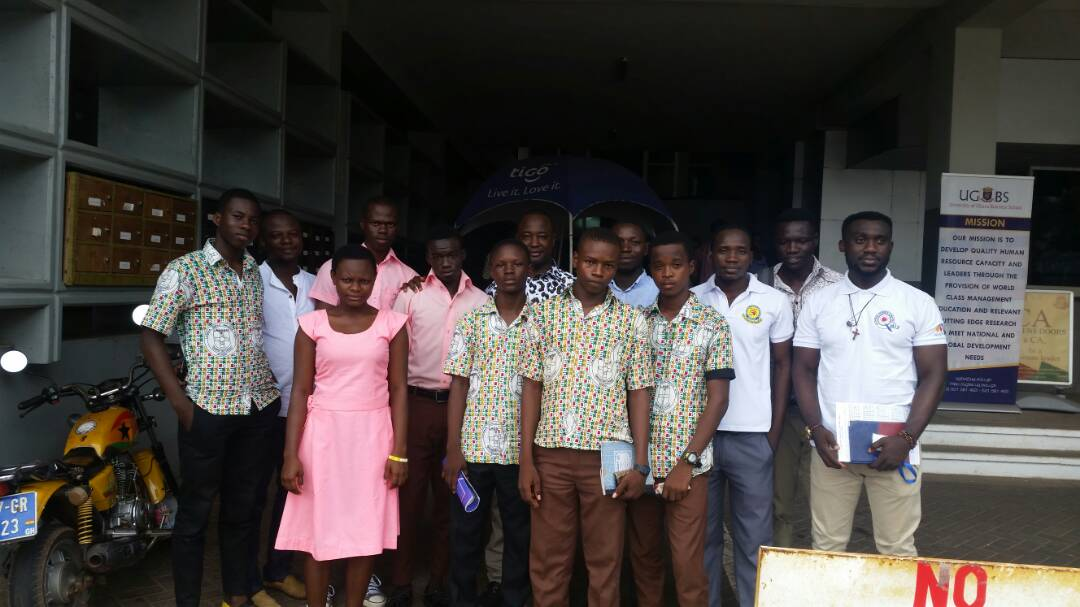
This is the group who represented Lassec at 2017 NSMQ

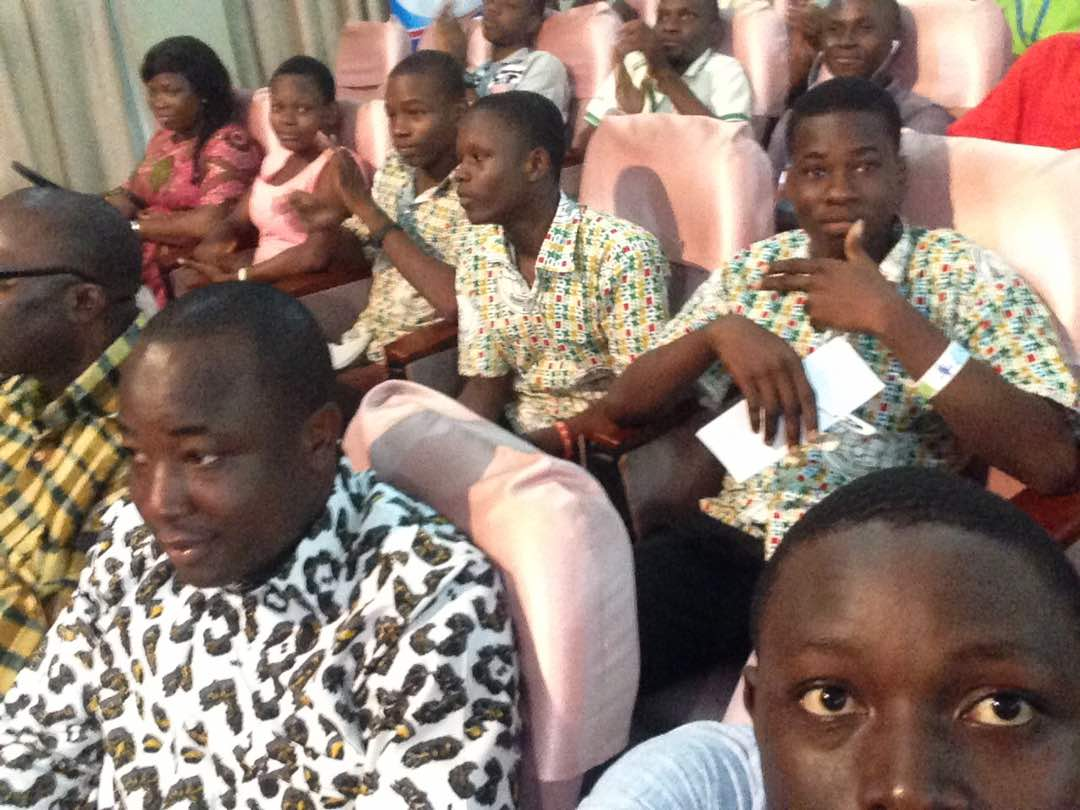
Taking pictures during the NSMQ

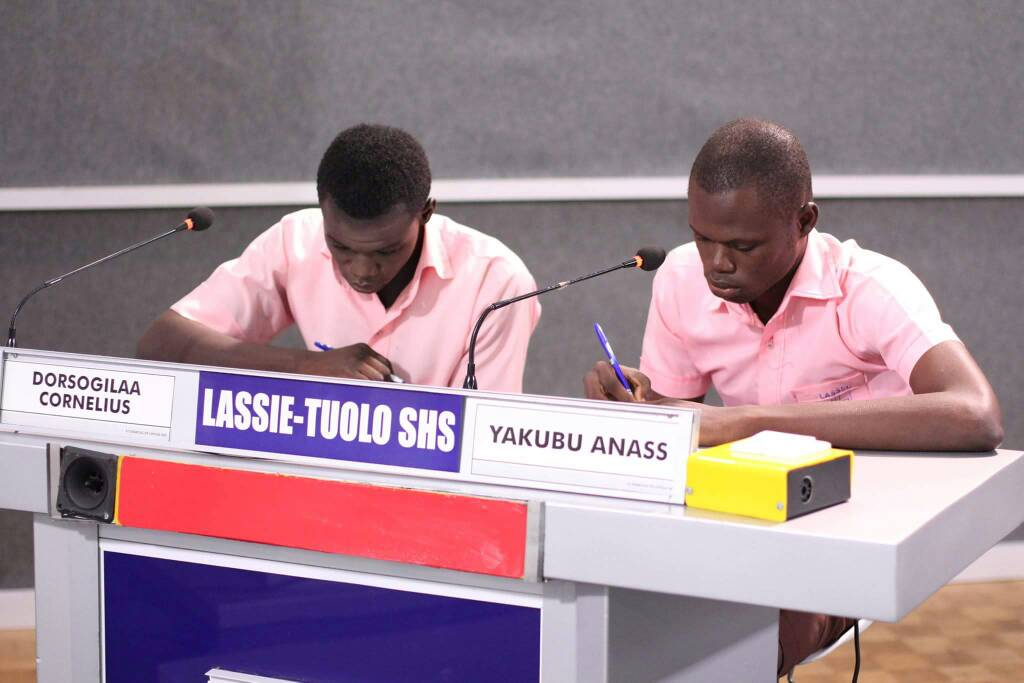
Two students at the NSMQ working hard to make Lassec proud

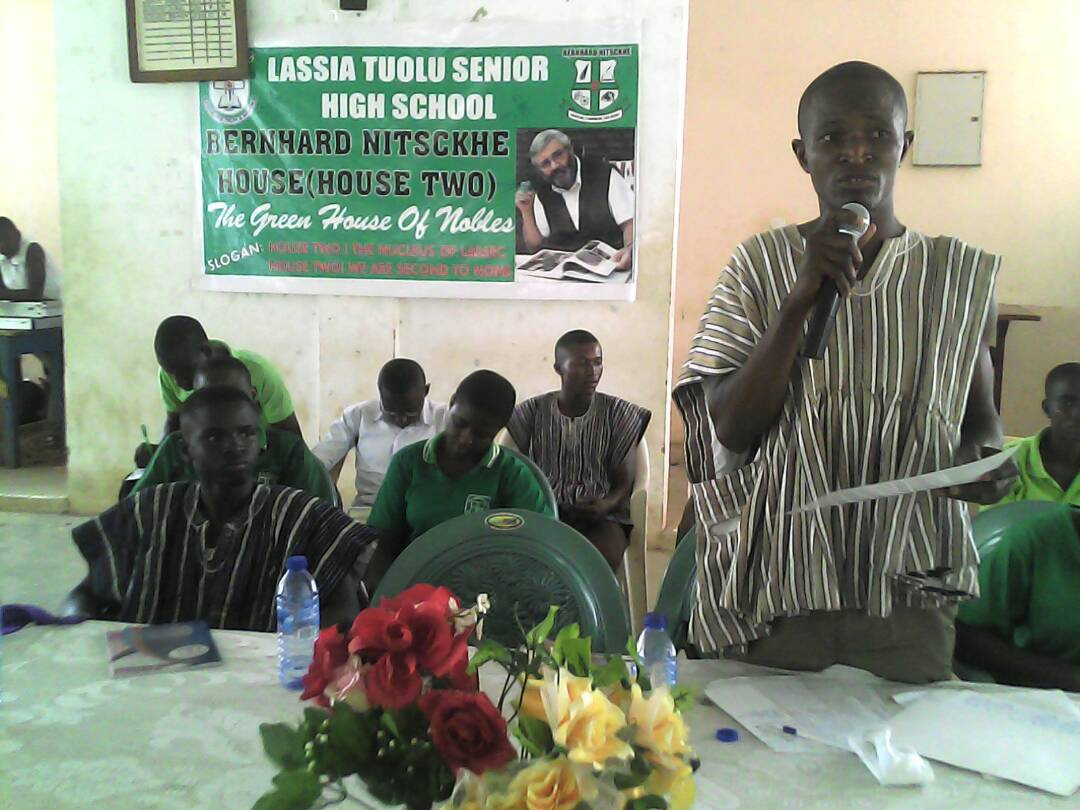
Master giving speech

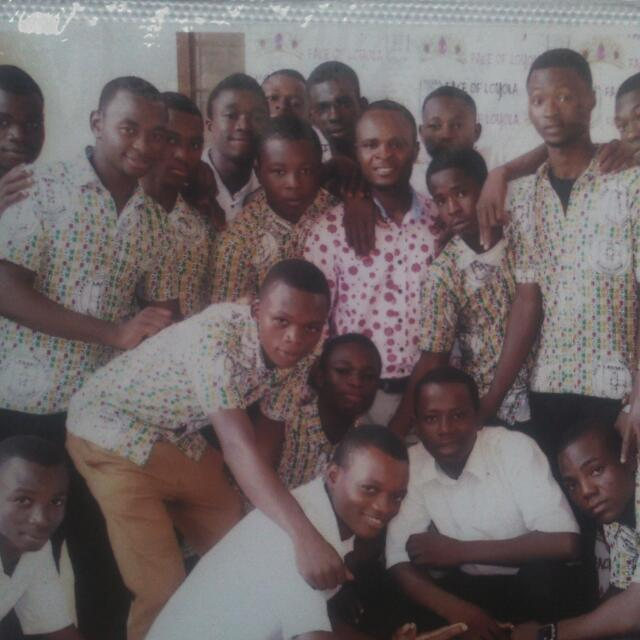
Science Class with Chemistry Teacher

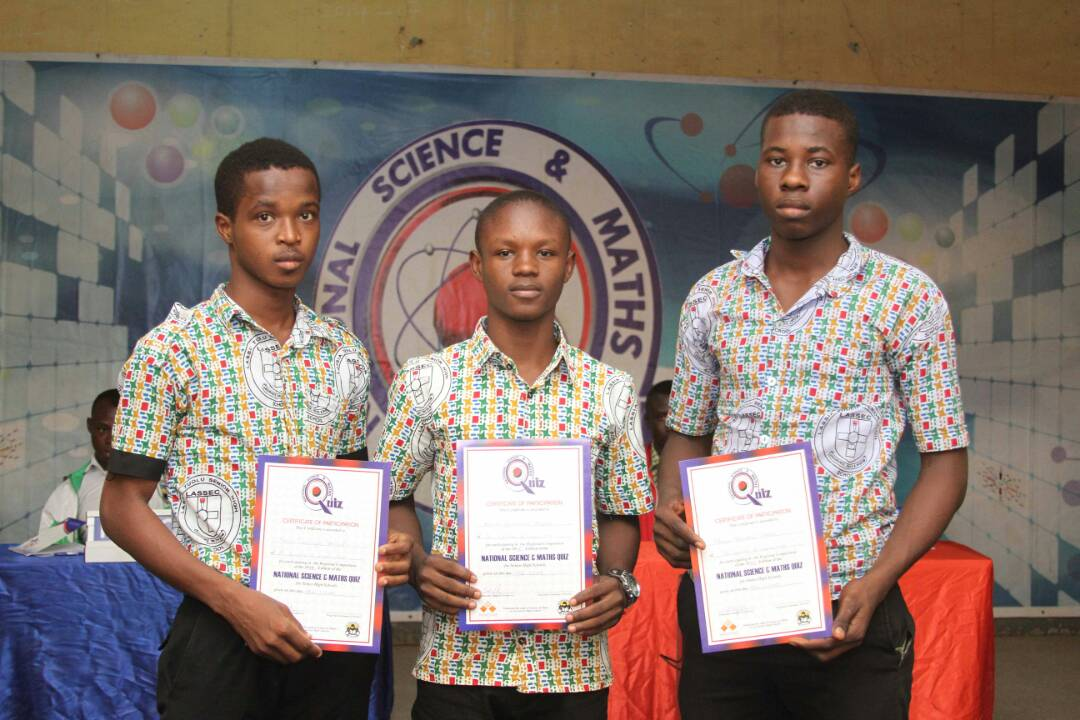
Students awarded with certificates for NSMQ at the regional level

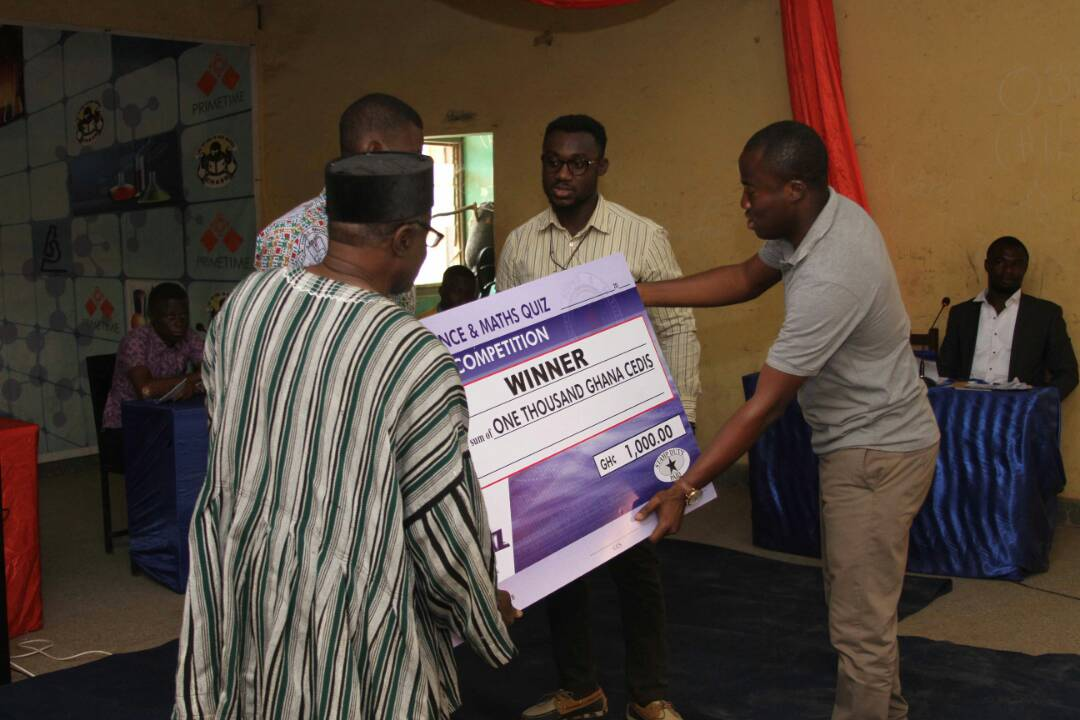
School awarded a cheque for their awesome performance and qualification to the 2018 NSMQ

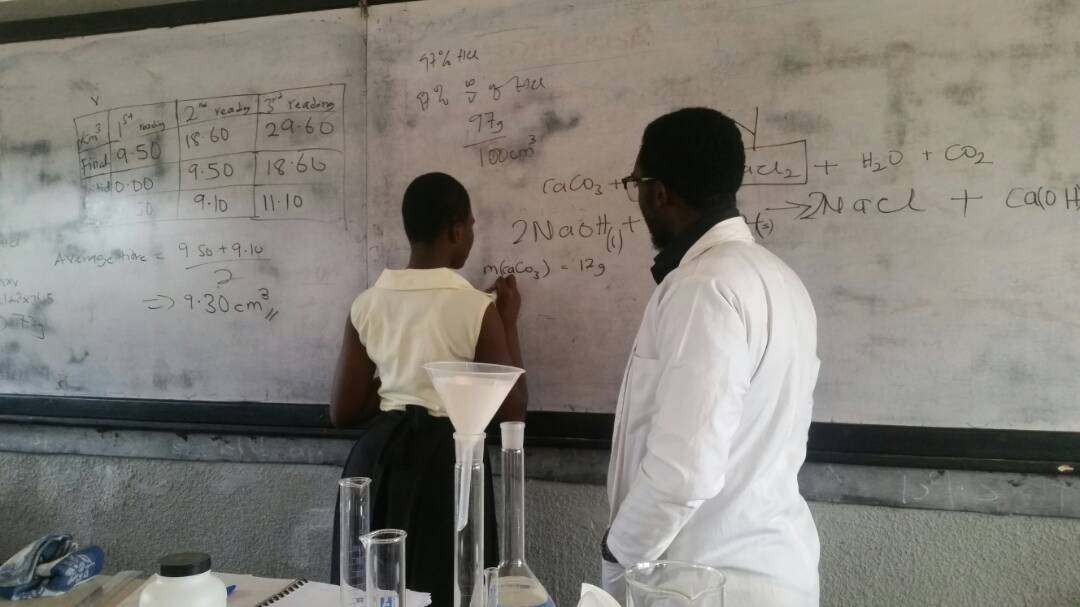
Student in ladies prefect wear solving a question

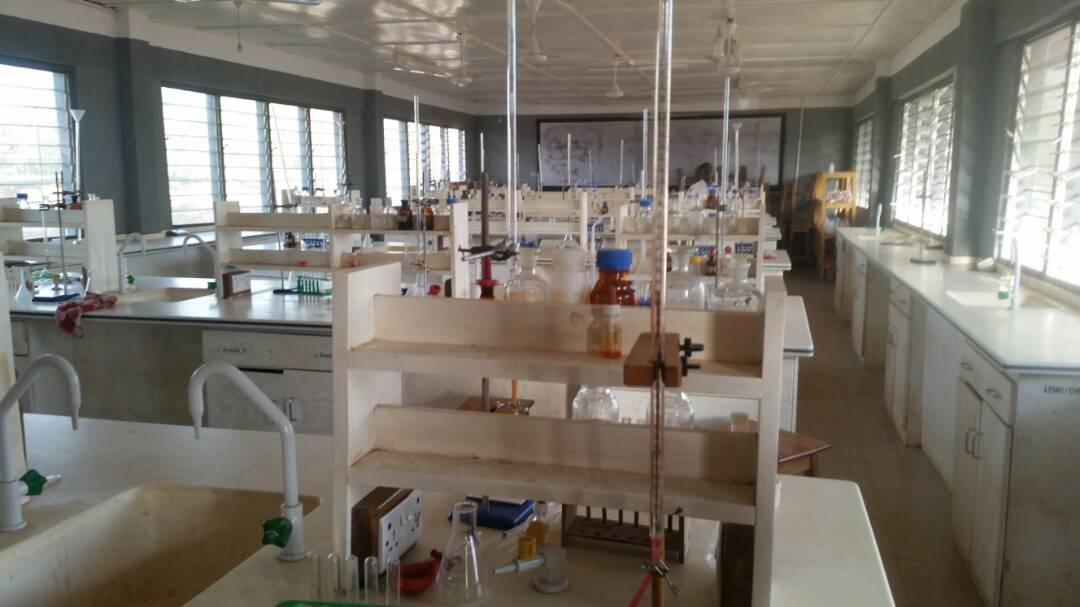
Interior part of Chemistry lab

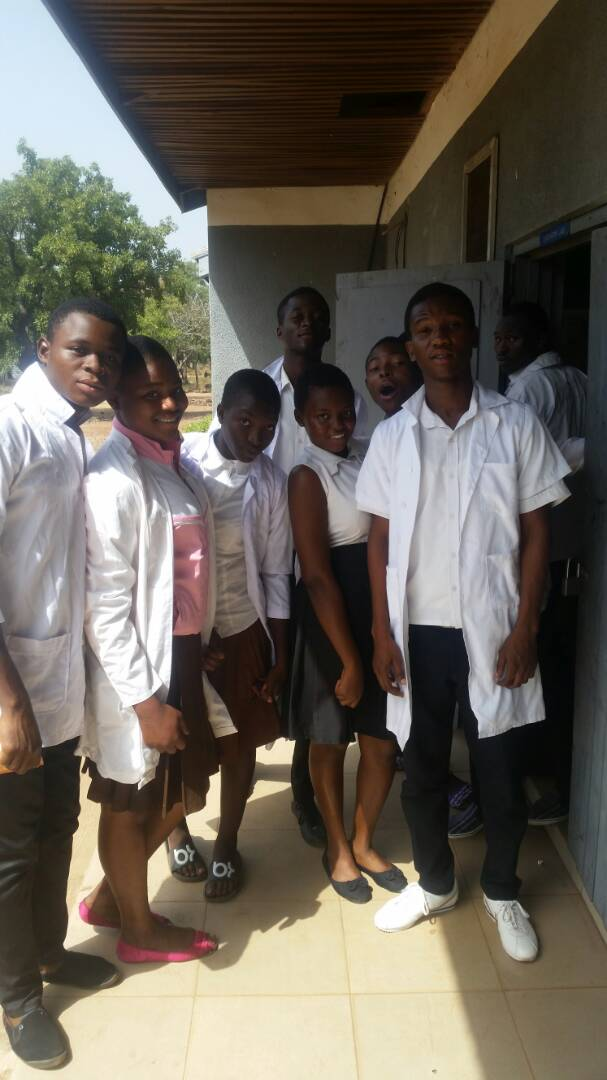
Students in their lab coats after Chemistry practicals

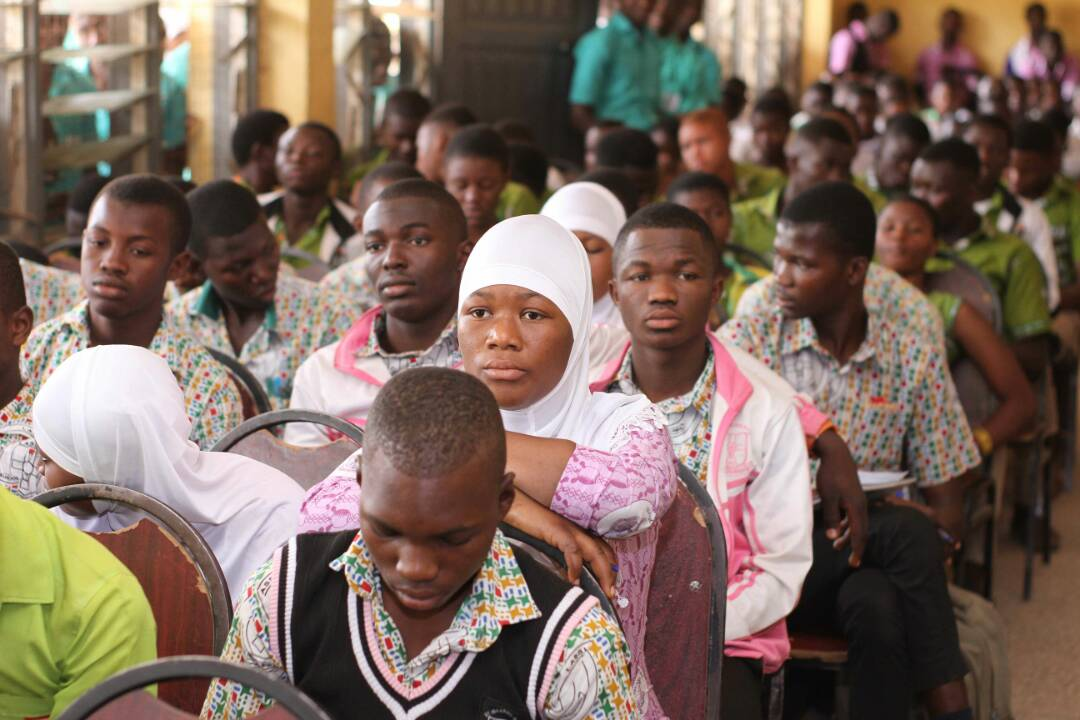
Inter-regional competition among Science and Maths Clubs

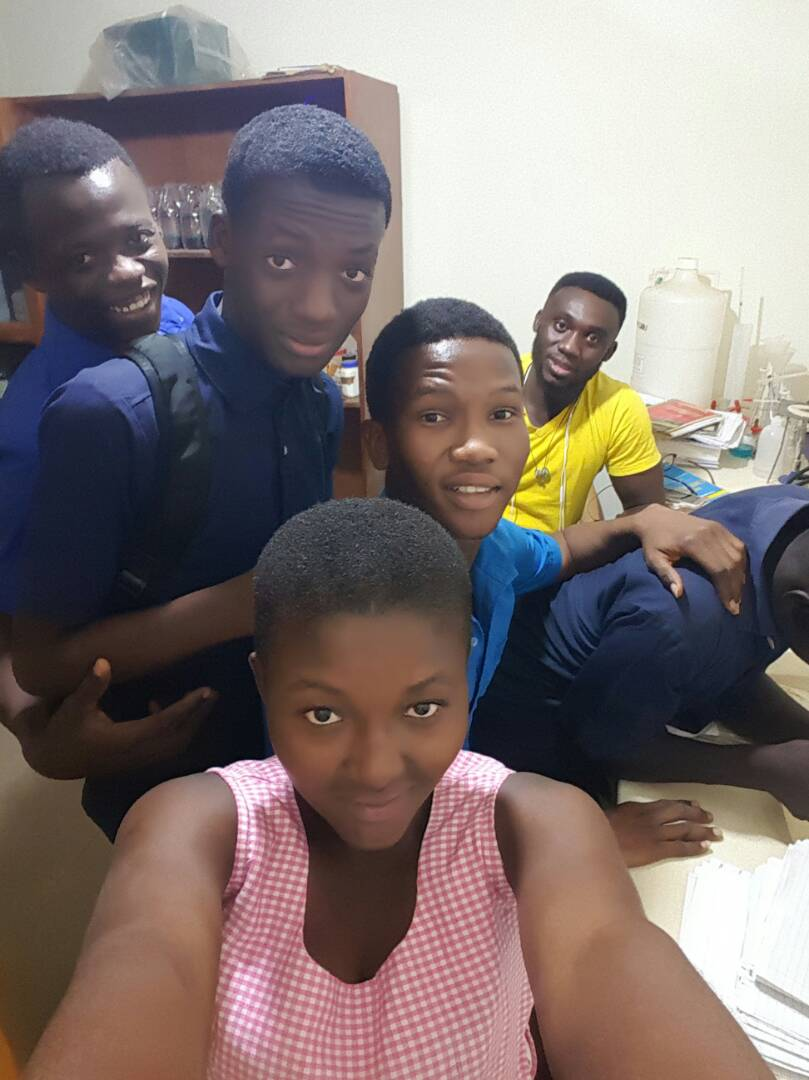
Taking selfies after a hectic day in school in the Chemistry lab

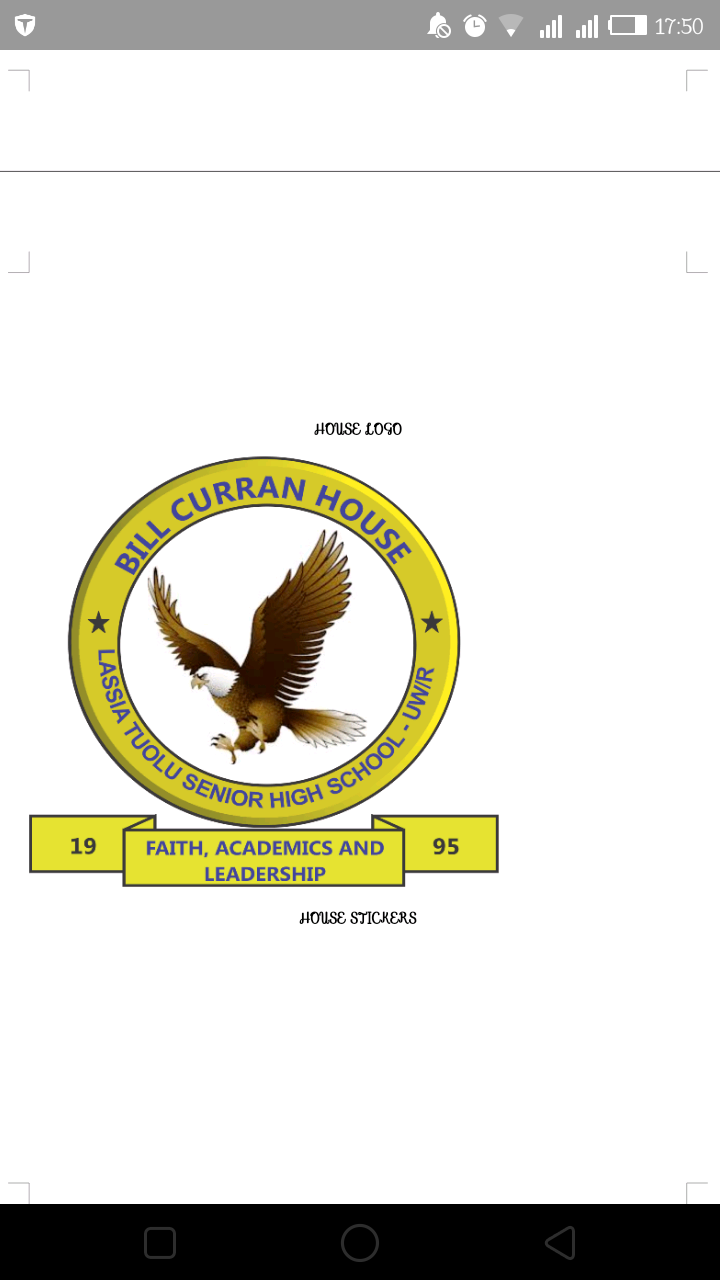
House 1 logo

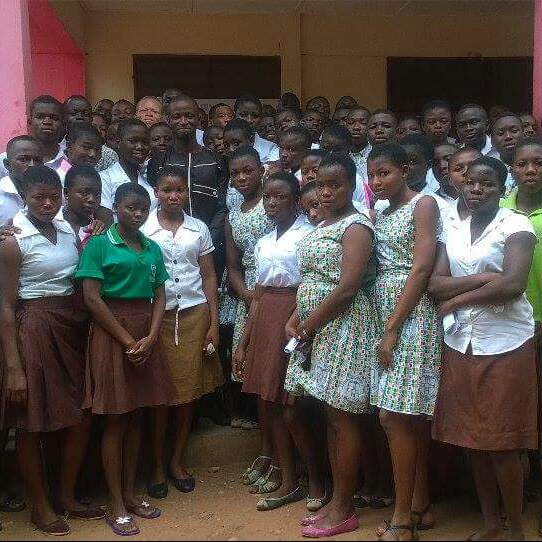
A photo-shoot of House members of Bernhard Nitscke

== See also ==
- List of senior high schools in Ghana
- Wa West District
