= Zamse Senior High Technical School =

Location
- Bolgatanga; Upper East Region; Ghana; 10.77484°N 0.85998°W

Information
- Type: Public high school
- Motto: Knowledge and Productivity
- Established: February 1976 (50 years ago)
- Status: Active
- School district: Bolgatanga Municipal
- Gender: Co-educational
- Classes offered: General Science; General Arts; Technical; Visual Arts; Home Economics

Zamse Senior High Technical School is a second-cycle co-educational institution located in Bolgatanga in the Upper East Region of Ghana.

== History ==
The school was formally established in 1976 as a junior high school named Bolgatanga Junior Secondary located in Bukere. However, on the 10th of October, 1979, it was changed to a technical senior high school and relocated to Bolgatanga Housing Estates area where it adopted its current name .

== Headmasters ==
- Francis Banbogo

== Infrastructure Challenges ==
The school has faced longstanding infrastructure challenges. Reports indicate shortages of classroom furniture, an inadequate dining hall, abandoned GETFund projects, and overcrowded facilities. In some instances, students have reportedly studied under temporary canopies and taken meals under trees due to insufficient infrastructure.

- Education in Ghana
- List of senior high schools in Ghana
