= Benkum Senior High School =

Location
- Larteh Akuapem; Eastern Region; PMB Larteh Akuapem; Ghana; 5.94177°N 0.0895°W

Information
- Type: Public high school
- Motto: Nimde3 ne Tumi
- Founder: Dr Alex Ansah Koi
- Status: Active
- School district: Akuapim North District
- Oversight: Ministry of Education
- Gender: Co-educational
- Age: 14 to 18
- Classes offered: General Arts, Home Economics, General Science, General Agriculture, Business, Visual Arts
- Language: English
- Houses: 4
- Colours: Blue and white

Benkum Senior High School, is a Presbyterian category A co-educational first-cycle institution in Larteh Akuapem in the Eastern Region of Ghana. The school colors are Blue and white.

The school runs courses in Business, General Science, General Arts, General Agriculture, Home Economics and Visual Arts, leading to the award of a West African Senior School Certificate (WASSCE).

== History ==
The school is a community-based institution school that was established by the Presbyterian Church of Ghana. The general objective of its establishment was to provide full secondary school education to the growing number of boys and girls, especially those resident around the Akuapem North and South community.

The school runs both day, boarding and hostel system with majority of the students in the boarding house.

The school's colors are blue and white. Guided by Presbyterian discipline, it has raised men and women of good character.

== Enrollment ==
The school has about 2,500 students enrolled in Business, Science, general arts, general agric, Home Economics and visual arts courses.

== Facilities ==
- 3 Science Laboratories ( Physics, Biology and Chemistry)
- I.C.T Lab
- Library
- Home Economics Lab
- Visual Arts Center
- School Farm
- Sports (standard field for soccer and athletics, basketball court, volley and handball court)
- School Clinic
- Barbering shop

== See also ==
- Education in Ghana
- List of senior high schools in Ghana
