= Fodoa Community Day Senior High School =

Public high school in Eastern Region, Ghana

Coordinates: 6.5952°N 0.8913°W

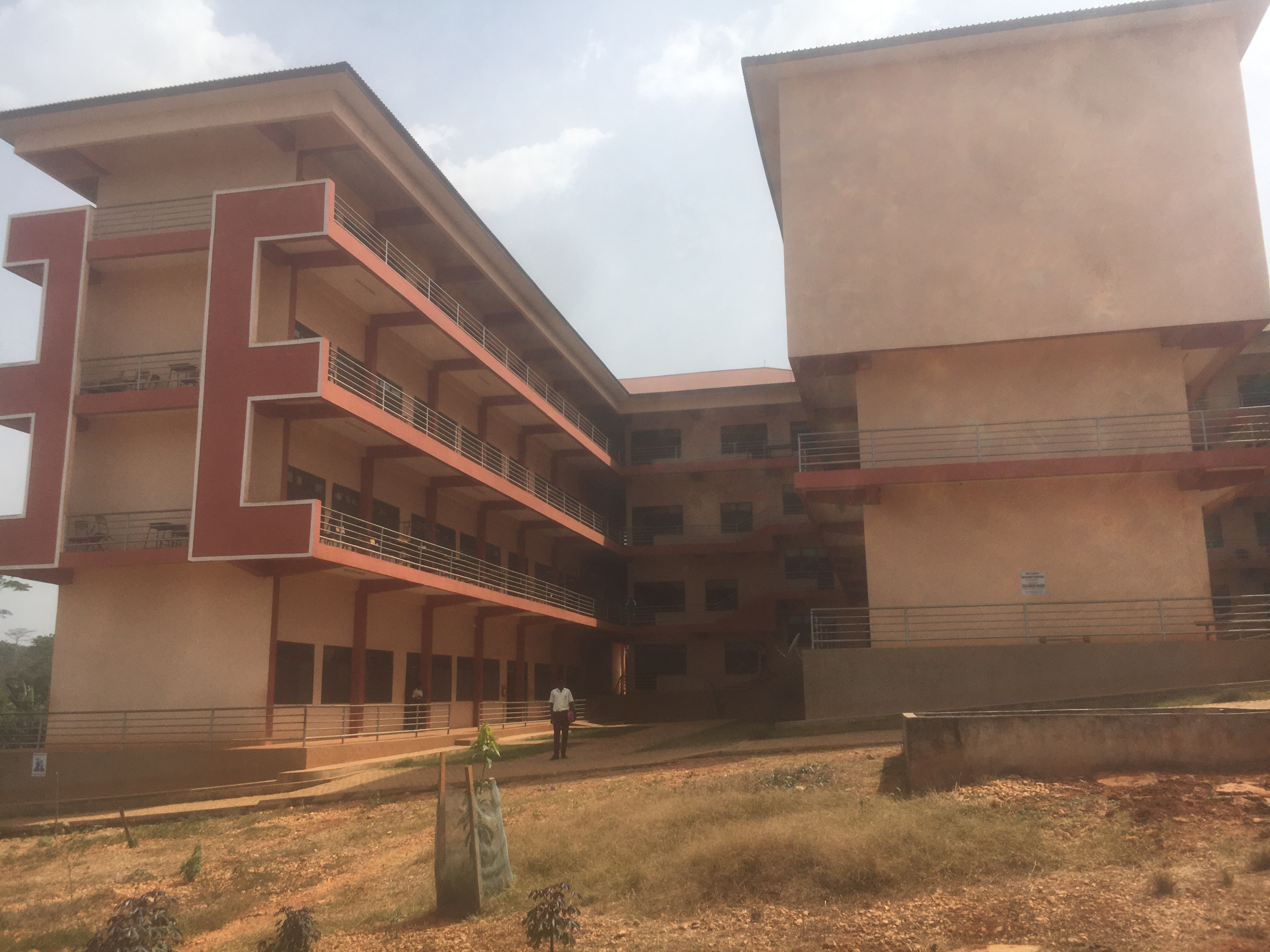
Fosec building

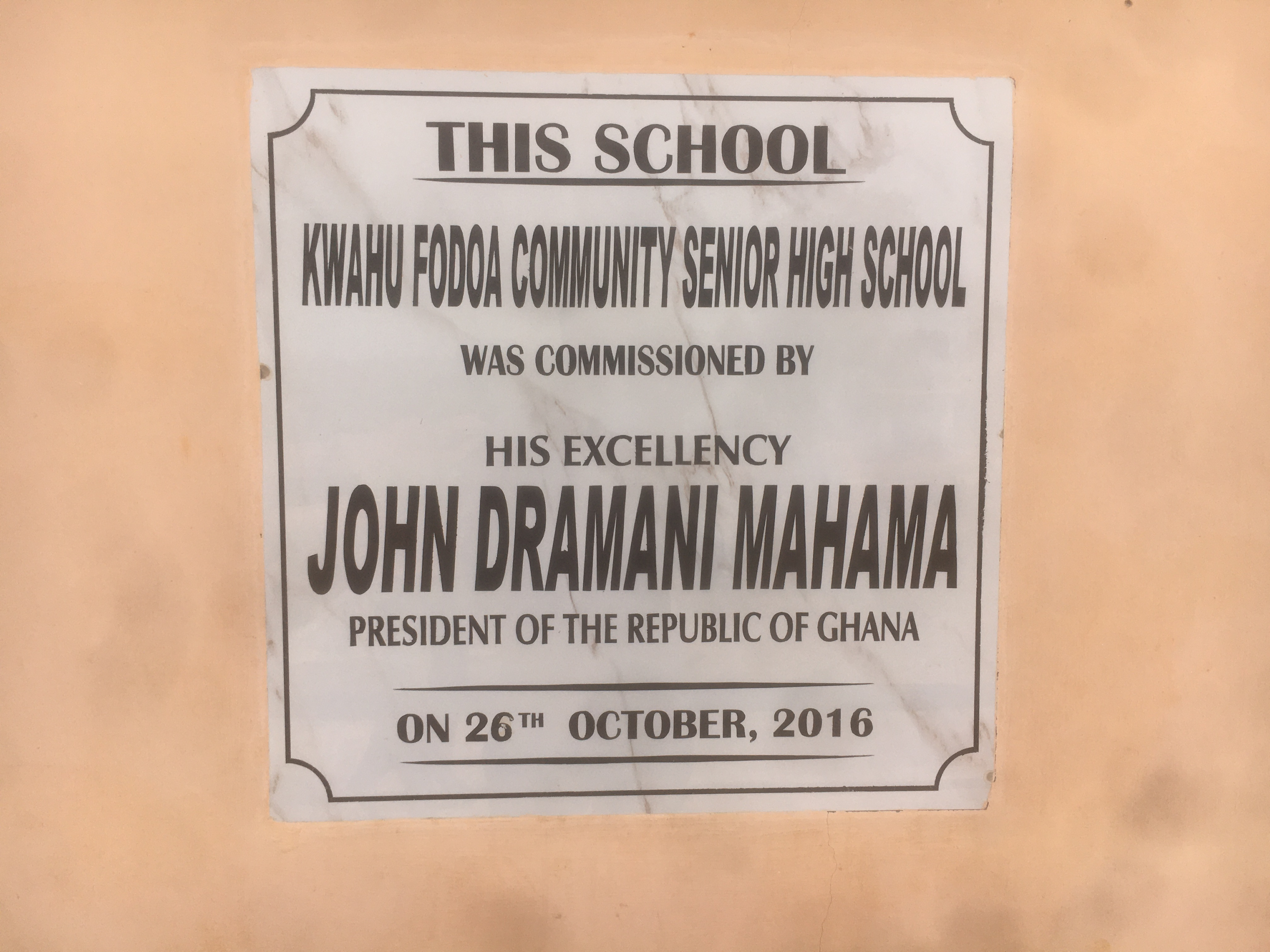
Fosec opening plaque

Fodoa Community Day Senior High School, also known as "Fosec", is a public senior high school located in Kwahu West Municipal, in the Eastern Region of Ghana. Fodoa Community Day Senior High School was commissioned on Wednesday, 26 October 2016. Since its inception, the school has been a purely day school and single track with no boarding facilities. However, there are private hostel facilities that accommodate most of the students of the school: one boys' hostel and one girls' hostel. The school is located along the Kumasi–Accra highway, about 34 km (21 mi) from Nkawkaw. The school is one of the centres for BECE in the Kwahu West Municipal.

== History ==
In September 2014, the chief executive for Kwahu West municipality, Hon Dr Alex Obeng Somuah, together with the chief executive for Kwahu East district, Hon Nana Antwi, and some other executives cut sod for the project to begin. The school was among the 200 community day schools President Mahama promised. The late Prof Nana Agyakwa Frimpong III, the then Fodoa chief expressed much satisfaction to the government for such a project to be established on his land.

Nananom poured libation, prayed to the almighty God and the gods of the land to deal with every impediment during the period. The project was finally completed in 2016 and commissioned by President Mahama on 26 October 2016.

== Academic programs ==
The school runs six academic programmes: General Science, Agricultural Science, Business, General Arts (four streams) and Vocational (Home Economics and Visual Arts)

Programme	Elective Subjects
General Arts 1	History, Christian Religious Studies (CRS), Lit-in-Eng, Akuapim Twi
General Arts 2	Elective Maths, Geography, Economics, Government
General Arts 3	Government, Geography, History, Literature-in-English
General Arts 4	Government, Geography, History, Twi
General Science	Physics, Chemistry, Biology, Elective Maths
Business	Financial Accounting, Principles of Cost Accounting, Business Management, Economics
Home Economics	Food & Nutrition/Clothing and Textiles, Management in Living, Biology, General Knowledge in Arts (GKA)
Visual arts	Leather work, Graphic Design, General Knowledge in Arts (GKA), Economics, ICT
Agricultural Science	Physics, Chemistry, Animal Husbandry, Crop Production, General Agriculture

== Headmasters/Headmistresses ==
NO	NAME	FROM	TO	DURATION
1	LETICIA ATUA-BAADU	2016	2018	2 YEARS
2	VORMAWOR M. AKU	2018	2019	6 MONTHS
3	JOYCE SUSANNA OTENG POKU	2019	2020	

== Achievements ==
- Sports: The school's performance at inter school sports competition is superb. Fodoa SHS as young as its school is, was able to eliminate the almighty Nkwatia Presbyterian Senior High (Nkwasco) from the 2019 academic year football competition and went ahead to beat St. Peters on their home grounds.
- Inter School March pass Competition: For the three years of its existence, the school has, on three consecutive times, emerged winners of the Inter-school Independence Day Match Pass Competition, organized by the Municipal Assembly and the Education Directorate.
