= Assin North Senior High School =

School in Ghana

Assin North Senior High/Technical School is a mixed gender category C high school at Assin Asempaneye of the Assin North Municipal in the Central Region of Ghana.

== History ==
Assin North Senior High/Technical School (also known as ANSTECH) was established in the year 1985 by six communities in the Assin North Municipal; Asempanaye, Danseme, Schiano, Kushea, Praso, and Breman as part of the first batches of schools selected to benefit from the Secondary Education Improvement Programme (SEIP). It was later absorbed by the Ghana Education Service in 1990 to start the Senior High Programme in Ghana.

== School motto and school code ==
The official motto of Assin North Senior High/Technical School is Honour your brains and hands with the slogan 'Adehye' (Royals). Also, the school's code is 0031204.

== Academic programs ==
Assin North Senior High/Technical School like any other senior high school in Ghana functions within the standard three-year Senior High School (SHS) curriculum framework established by Ghana's National Council for Curriculum and Assessment (NaCCA). Currently, Assin North Senior High/Technical School runs seven programs which include the following;

- Agric
- Business
- Technical
- Home Economics
- Visual Arts
- General Arts
- General Science

== Facilities ==
Assin North Senior High/Technical School has the following facilities;

- Clothing and Textiles Department
- Visual Arts Studio
- Home Economics Kitchen
- STEM Lab (Robotics and Electronic Programming)
- Science Laboratories (Biology Lab, Physics Lab and Chemistry Lab)
- Library
- Dining Hall
- Dormitories (Boys and Girls)

== Achievements ==
Notable achievements of Assin North Senior High/Technical School include;

- 2019 – 100% in the Following Subjects: Elective ICT, Financial Accounting, Cost Accounting, Clothing and Textiles, Woodwork, Building Contraction, and French.
- 4th Position UBA Essay Competition at UBA Head office Accra by Michael Amissah.
- 1st Position – Inter School Debate Competition at Assin Fosu
- 2020 – Zonal Articles Champions with 27 Medals.
- 2019 – 5 out of 6 Gold Medals competed for in all Ball games (Soccer, Volley, and Handball)
- 2018 – 4 out of 6 Gold Medals competed for in all Ball games (Soccer, Volley, and Handball)
- 2017 – 4 out of 6 Gold Medals competed for in all Ball games (Soccer, Volley, and Handball)
