= Asukawkaw =

- Country: Ghana
- Region: Oti Region

Asukawkaw is a town in the Oti Region of Ghana. The town is known for the Asukawkaw Secondary School. The school is a second cycle institution.
