= Baglo =

Coordinates: 7°18′N 0°38′E

- Interactive map of Baglo
- Country: Ghana
- Region: Volta Region

Baglo is a town in the Volta Region of Ghana. The town is known for the Baglo Secondary School. The school is a second cycle institution.
