= Gbledi-Agbogame =

Gbledi-Gborgame
- Country: Ghana
- Region: Volta Region

Gbledi-Gborgame is a town in the Volta Region of Ghana. The town is known for the Afadjato Secondary Technical School. The school is a second cycle institution.
