= Karaga Senior High School =

School in Ghana

Coordinates: 9.9545°N 0.4396°W

Karaga Senior High School is a mixed-gender public senior high school located in the Karaga District in the Northern region of Ghana. The school is classified as a Category C institution. The school also admit both boarding and day students and is a mix-gender school.The school code is 0081401.
