= Nuriyya Islamic Institute =

Islamic and secular education institution in Tamale, Ghana

Nuriyya Islamic Institute is an Islamic and secular education institution located in Tamale, the Northern Region of Ghana. It is one of the most popular Islamic Schools in Bulpeila Community, a suburb of Tamale South Constituency.

== History ==
In the 1960s, Sheikh Ibrahim Basha Bayaan left Anbariyya Islamic Institute and established Madrasat Nuriyya in 1969 now Nuriyya Islamic Institute. Nuriyya Islamic Institute became one of the first Islamic schools to integrate Anglo-Arabic teaching and Arabic in the Northern Region. In 2022, the institute launched its Senior High School Block located along Vitting-Tua Road in Tamale.
