= Offuman =

- Country: Ghana
- Region: Bono East region

Offuman is a town in the Bono East Region of Ghana. Offuman is in the Techiman North District of the Bono East Region of Ghana, in northeastern Techiman, 21 kilometers from Tuobodom and 13 km southwest of Wenchi. Offuman has a population of 8,277.
