= Fawoade =

Coordinates: 6°47′N 1°35′W

- Interactive map of Fawoade
- Country: Ghana
- Region: Ashanti Region

Fawoade is a town in the Ashanti Region of Ghana. The town is known for the Simms Secondary School. The school is a second cycle institution.
