= Antoa Senior High School =

- Antoa; Ashanti Region; Ghana

Information
- Type: Public Senior High School
- Established: 1969; 57 years ago
- Status: Boarding and Day
- School district: Kwabre East Municipal District
- Category: Category C
- Gender: Coeducational

Antoa Senior High School (ANSEC) is a coeducational Category C public high school located in Antoa within the Kwabre East Municipal District in the Ashanti Region of Ghana. The school provides both boarding and day student facilities.

== History ==
Antoa Senior High School was established in 1969 by elders of the Antoa community under the original name Adonten Akoten Secondary School. It started as a private institution operating out of makeshift classrooms with an initial enrollment of 12 students. In September 1971, the school was absorbed into the public education system by the Government of Ghana and officially renamed Antoa Secondary School.

== Mission ==
The mission of the school includes ensuring discipline among staff and students, motivating staff, especially teaching staff, to give their best, adopting open administration, and giving the school a good tone.

== Vision ==
The school aims to be an institute of academic excellence, development of sports and acceptable moral development among students, promoting a high sense of discipline among them.

== Academic programs ==
The school operates within the standard Senior High School (SHS) curriculum framework established by Ghana's Ministry of Education and National Council for Curriculum and Assessment (NaCCA). The school offers six academic courses:

- General Science
- General Arts
- Visual Arts
- Business
- Home Economics
- Agricultural Science
