= Adadeentem =

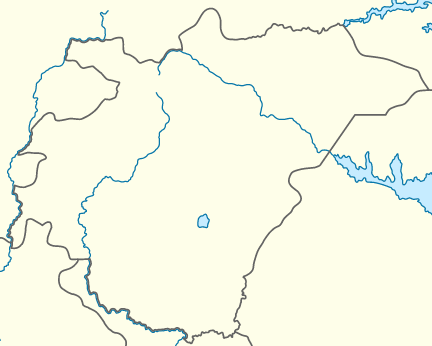
- Location within Ashanti Location within Ghana
- Coordinates: 6.7058°N 1.4241°W
- Country: Ghana
- Region: Ashanti Region

Adadientem, (pronouncition) Adadeɛntɛm is a town in the Ashanti Region of Ghana. The town is known for the Church of Christ Senior High School. The school is a second cycle institution.
