= Asankrangwa Senior High Technical School =

Public school in Ghana

Coordinates: 5.8153°N 2.4402°W

- Asankragua, Western Region; Ghana

Information
- Type: secondary/high school, Technical
- Established: 1991 (35 years ago)
- Grades: Forms [1-3]
- Nickname: ASECTECH

Asankrangwa Senior High Technical School (also known as ASECTECH) is a second cycle institution located in Asankragua in the Wassa Amenfi West District in the Western Region of Ghana. The school is located along the Enchi Road.

== History ==
The school was established in 1991.
