= Podoe =

Coordinates: 6°18′N 0°12′E

- Interactive map of Podoe
- Country: Ghana
- Region: Volta Region

Padoe is a town in the Volta Region of Ghana. The town is known for the Dofor Commercial and Agricultural Secondary School. The school is a second cycle institution.
