= Wamahinso =

- Location of Wamahinso in Ghana
- Coordinates: 7°06′N 2°21′W
- Country: Ghana
- Region: Ahafo Region

Wamahinso is a town in the Asutifi North District in the Ahafo Region of Ghana. The town is known for the Gyamfi Kumanin Senior High Technical School. The school is a second cycle institution.

== Economy ==
Like many other communities in the Ahafo Region, agricultural farming is the main occupation. However, the presence of Newmont Goldcorp Ghana in the Wamahinso area has absorbed a lot of the youth into Mining. The major cash crops grown in this area is cocoa. Plantain, Cassava are among the food crops grown by residents in the area mostly on subsistence basis.
