= Mozano =

- Town
- Country: Ghana
- Region: Central Region

Mozano is a town in the Central region of Ghana. The town is known for the Mozano Community Secondary School. The school is a second cycle institution. The index number of the school is 0030504. It was established in the year 1982 and was approved by the Government in 1992 by Ex-president Jerry John Rawlings. The school can be described as one of the best school in Gomoa West District. The school was awarded the best senior high school in Ghana, in the year 2004. The school is now a senior high with boarding facility and the students are grouped into four houses. House one The Akaboha house(colour: Green), House two(colour: Blue), House three The Nkrumah house(colour:Red) and The Valco house four (colour: Yellow). The school produced the youngest lawyer in Ghana. And notable students are Bright Gyampson; Library Prefect, 2019, Turkson Takyi Nicholas, 2019 And Maleek; School Prefect, 201.
