= Asem, Kumasi =

Town in Ashanti region, Ghana

Coordinates: 7°07′N 1°28′W

Asem is a town in Kumasi in the Ashanti Region of Ghana.

== Town structure ==
The town in under the jurisdiction of the Kumasi Metropolitan Assembly and is in the Subin constituency of the Ghana parliament.
