= Nuaso =

Town in Eastern Region, Ghana

Coordinates: 6°09′N 0°02′E

Nuaso is a town in Ghana. It is near Odumase Krobo in the Eastern Region. It is part of the Manya Krobo Municipality.
