= Lawra Senior High School =

Ghanaian Senior High School

Coordinates: 10.635°N 2.877°W

Lawra Senior High School is an educational institution located in the Lawra Municipality formerly Lawra District in the Upper West Region of Ghana. In 2018, Nana Akufo-Addo announced the construction of a new assembly hall complex for the school. The project got stalled as at 2024.

== Students drowning ==
In 2025, ten students of the school tried to cross the Black Volta at Dikpe. The canoe capsized and seven students lost their lives whiles three swam to safety.
