= Brewaniase =

Coordinates: 8°00′N 0°34′E

- Interactive map of Brewaniase
- Country: Ghana
- Region: Volta Region

Brewaniase is a town in the Volta Region of Ghana. The town is known for the Ntruboman Secondary School. The school is a second cycle institution.
