= Bampanase =

- Country: Ghana
- Region: Ashanti Region

Bampanase is a town in the Ashanti Region of Ghana. The town is known for the Kofi Adjei Secondary/Technical School. The school is a second cycle institution.
