= Maabang =

- Country: Ghana
- Region: Ashanti Region

Maabang is a town in the Ashanti Region of Ghana. The town is known for the Maabang Secondary Technical School. The school is a second cycle institution.
