= New Edubiase Senior High School =

Co-educational second-cycle institution in Ashanti Region, Ghana

Coordinates: 6.067°N 1.398°W

- New Edubiase, Adansi South District; Ghana

Information
- Type: secondary/high school
- Established: September 1969
- Grades: Forms [1-3]
- Nickname: NESS

New Edubiase Senior High School is a co-educational second-cycle institution in New Edubiase in the Adansi South District in the Ashanti Region of Ghana. The school was established in September 1969. The school took part in the 2025 Ashanti Regional qualifiers of the National Science and Maths Quiz (NSMQ). As at 2016, the headmistress of the school was Doris Appiah.
