= Nyankumase Ahenkro =

- Town
- Country: Ghana
- Region: Central Region

Nyankumase Ahenkro is a town in the Central Region. The town is known for the Nyankumase Ahenkro Secondary School. The school is a second cycle institution.
