= Akome =

- Country: Ghana
- Region: Volta Region

Akome is a town in the Ho West District in the Volta Region of Ghana. The town is known for the Akome Secondary and Technical School. The school is a second cycle institution.
