= Edinaman Secondary School =

Location
- Elmina; Ghana

Information
- Established: 1978; 47 years ago
- Gender: Mixed

Edinaman Secondary School is a co-ed second cycle institution at Elmina in Ghana. It was established on January 19, 1978, and started offering educational services from the Elmina Castle. The school moved to its current location, the Paul Isert Hill in 1992. The school began its boarding system in the year 2008 under the administration of Mr. Francis Amanfo.
