= Agona Abirem =

- Town
- Country: Ghana
- Region: Central Region

Agona Abirem is a town in the Komenda Edina Eguafo Abrem (KEEA) Municipality in the Central region of Ghana. The town is known for the Eguafo-Abrem Secondary School. The school is a second cycle institution.
