= Agona Senior High Technical School =

Public high school in Agona, Ashanti Region, Ghana

Location
- P. O. Box 52; Agona, Sekyere South District, Ashanti Region; Ghana; 6.927406°N 1.483069°W

Information
- School type: Public high school Coeducational
- Motto: Courage, Perseverance and Tolerance
- Denomination: Presbyterian Church of Ghana
- Established: 1901
- School district: Sekyere South district
- Oversight: Ministry of Education
- School code: 0050606
- Head of school: Rev. Mrs. Kate Oye Addo Gyan
- Head teacher: Agyemang Boateng
- Gender: Unisex
- Age: 13 to 19
- Language: English
- Houses: 4
- Colours: Green and yellow
- Slogan: Astec
- Song: Great Astec(we are moving on)
- Sports: Soccer, athletics, handball, volleyball
- Nickname: Astec
- Rival: SDA Senior High School, Agona
- Accreditation: Ghana Education Service
- USNWR ranking: 10th
- Alumni: Astosa
- Website: agonasectecshsedu.com

Agona Senior High Technical School is a senior high school located at Agona in the Ashanti Region of Ghana.

== See also ==
- Education in Ghana
- List of schools in Ghana
