= Adanwomase Senior High School =

Adanwomasi Senior High School

Location
- P. O. Box; Adanwomase; Ashanti; Ghana; 6.831359°N 1.462632°W

Information
- School type: Public high school Mixed school
- Established: 1972
- Status: Active
- School district: Kwabre East District
- Oversight: Ministry of Education
- Gender: Coeducational
- Age: 14 to 18
- Classes offered: Home economics, science, general arts

Adanwomasi Senior High School is a coeducational second-cycle institution at Adanwomasi in the Kwabre East District of Ashanti.

== History ==
It was established as a private institution in 1972. The school started with a student population of 32 with 6 teachers and 19 non-teaching staff. The school was absorbed into the public system in 1977.

== School Visiting Days ==
Saturdays and Sundays from 12pm to 5pm of the second and fourth week of each month
