= Tema Community 5 =

- Interactive map of Tema Community 5
- Coordinates: 5.6432°N 0.0163°E
- Country: Ghana
- Region: Greater Accra Region

Tema Community 5 is a residential area in Tema in the Greater Accra Region of Ghana. The town is known for the Tema Secondary School. The school is a second cycle institution.
