= Okadjakrom =

- Town
- Interactive map of Okadjakrom
- Country: Ghana
- Region: Oti Region
- Time zone: UTC±00:00

Okadjakrom is a small town located in the Jasikan District of the newly created Oti Region of Ghana. The resident are predominantly farmers. The main cash crop for the area is Coaoa Beans the main ingredient for chocolate and the main language spoken there is Leleme. The town is known for the Okadjakrom Secondary Technical School. The school is a second cycle institution.
