= Aboaso =

- Town
- Location in Ghana
- Coordinates: 6°48′34″N 1°32′13″W
- Country: Ghana
- Region: Ashanti Region

Aboaso is a town in the Ashanti Region of Ghana, located about 12 miles (19 km) northeast of Kumasi. The town is known for its rich cultural diversity. Aboaso is known for the Gyaama Pensan Secondary Technical School. The school is a second cycle institution.

SCHOOLS

Gyaama Pensan Secondary Technical School, shortly known as (GYAPESH) is a fast rising school in the kwabre East District of Ghana. The school was established as a private institution in 1995 by one Dr. Kofi Asante Gyapong, then Chief of the Aboaso town. He named the School after the Queen Mother of the town. The school was absorbed into the public sysytem in 1998.

The Mission of Gyaama Pensan is to provide grounds for effective teaching and learning environment through demonstration of skills, discipline and hard work. The school`s motto is (RIDE HIGH).

The Vision of the school is to provide highest quality and relevant education to teens to enable them acquire skills that will assist them to develop their potential and make them productive in their community.
