= Kadjeto-Asato =

Asato
- Town
- Interactive map of Asato
- Country: Ghana
- Region: Oti Region
- District: Kadjebi District

Asato is a town in the Oti Region of Ghana. The town is known for the Kadjebi-Asato Secondary School. The school is a second cycle institution. Asato is an Akan speaking community. They are one of the group of Akans under the known Denkyira Kingdom.

Kadjebi is also a town closer to Asato but Kadjebi and Asato are two different towns with different chiefs but shares the same culture as Akans.
