= Awoshie =

Coordinates: 5°35′N 0°17′W

- Interactive map of Awoshie
- Country: Ghana
- Region: Greater Accra Region

Awoshie is a town located in Ga central and Ablekuma North Municipal Districts of the Greater Accra Region of Ghana.

== Politics ==
Awoshie is in two different constituencies, namely : Anyaa - sowutuom constituency and Ablekuma North constituency headed by Honorable Dickson Adomako Kissi and Honorable Sheila Bartels respectively, both Members of the New Patriotic Party. The constituencies are boundary by the Lafa river. The Chief of Awoshie/ Lafa is Nii Kwatekwei I Awoshie Lafa Mantse and his Stool Queen Naa Afie Tawiah Awoshie/Lafa Manye

Traditionally, most of the lands of Awoshie are under the Gbawe Kwatei Family Stool Lands.

== Education ==
Awoshie has both Basic and Secondary institutions. These institutions are government and privately owned. Notable among them are :

Odorgonnor Senior High School (Government owned)

Apostle Sarfo School of Arts and Sciences (private owned)

Edge Hill Senior High School.(private owned)

Pank senior High School.

== Health ==
Amoah Hospital and Mary- Lucy Hospital located in Awoshie Station and Awoshie Last Stop respectively are the hospitals located in Awoshie. A clinic is under construction at Adaa maame. There are other private owned clinics and maternity homes.

== Economy ==
Awoshie is a busy town with most people staying up late either to buy or sell. The streets are studded with many food joints with waakye and rice being the most common during the day time. The nights are alive with music from various clubs, pubs, and so on. Notable among these are Pinkberry, Chicken Man, Pizza Man and Park & Pork, located at Mangoase. Abrantie is a popular bus stop where a lot of drinking bars like Nana Ama Spot, Ultimate Point Bar, and mini-mart traders operate daily.

Awoshie happens to be a residential area with most of women engaged in one form of trade or the other. Typically, a day in Awoshie begins at 4 AM when market women leave their homes to the roadside to join buses mostly headed for Accra central. A few join buses headed for other markets such as the Kasoa, Madina markets and so on. Men, on the other hand, are usually preparing to drive the market women to town around this time. As the day grows and more market women have been conveyed to their destinations, the way is clear for others like hawkers, mobile money agents, food vendors, students, cobblers, etc
