= Akim Begoro =

- Country: Ghana
- Region: Eastern Region (Ghana)

Akim Begoro is a town in the Eastern region of Ghana. The town is known for the Begoro Presbyterian Senior High School. The school is a second cycle institution.
