= Aduman =

Coordinates: 6°50′N 1°37′W

- Interactive map of Aduman
- Country: Ghana
- Region: Ashanti Region

Aduman is a town in the Ashanti Region of Ghana. It is located in the Afigya-Kwabre District of Ghana. The town is known for the Aduman Senior High School. The school is a second cycle institution. The major occupation is Agriculture. It is about 15 km away from the Capital of Ashanti, and 3 km away from the District Capital. About 98% of the population are Christians. The remaining 2% form other religions.
