= Assin Darmang =

- Town
- Country: Ghana
- Region: Central Region

Assin Darmang is a town in the Central Region. The town is known for the Adankwaman and Holycity Senior High School.other popular towns in the district (Assin South) includes Nyankumasi Ahenkro, Assin Ongwa (Aworoso) and Assin Jakai. The school is a second cycle institution.
