= Kintampo Senior High School =

School in the Bono East region of Ghana

Coordinates: 8.061°N 1.723°W

Kintampo Senior High School, also known as Great KiNSS, is a co-educational pre-tertiary institution located in Kintampo in the Kintampo North Municipal District in the Bono East Region of Ghana. On March 9, 2021, the school emerged as the overall winners of the pre-independence "What Do You Know" contest in Accra.

== History ==
The School was established on Friday, October 15, 1975, by the Government of Ghana in collaboration with community members. The school started with a student population of 32 of which 29 were male and 3 were female. One Mr. J.B Mensah provided his residence for academic activities of the infant school. The school celebrated their 50th anniversary in 2024

== Awards ==
The school won the 64th edition of the independence Day Quiz in 2021. The school emerged as winners of three schools: Bolgatanga Seniot High School, Mawuli Senior High School and I.T Ahmadiyya Senior High School. The competition was held at the Ghana Broadcasting Corporation (GBC).

== Operation ==
The school is under the Ghana Education Service of the Government of Ghana. The school is located in the heart of Kintampo, alone the Kintampo-Tamale Highway.

The school has a student population of 2,798 and a staff of 186: 134 teaching and 54 non-teaching. The school has a boarding facility for students. It has about 1,417 boarding students and 1,381-day students.

The school six programmes: General Arts, General Science, Business, Home Science, Agricultural Science and Visual Art.
