= Walewale Senior High Technical School =

Senior High school in North East Region, Ghana

Coordinates: 10°20′36″N 0°48′27″W

- Walewale, North East Region; Ghana

Information
- Type: secondary/high school, Technical
- Motto: Success through hard work
- Established: 1982 (44 years ago)
- Grades: Forms [1–3]
- Nickname: WALSECTECH

Walewale Senior High Technical School (WALSECTECH) is a second-cycle mixed gender institution located in Walewale, West Mamprusi District, Northeast Region of Ghana along the walewale Wungu road. Walewale Senior High School belongs to category C. The current headmaster of the school is Sebiyam Ibrahim.

== History ==
The school was established in 1982. In 2014, the headmaster of the school was Chief Kuipo Harrison. In 2019, the student population of school was about 2276 students. In April 2022, the school was provided with ICT equipment and facilities by the Israeli embassy in Ghana.

== Courses offered ==
Courses offered at the school includes:

- Business
- Technical
- Home economics
- Visual art
- General arts
- General science
