= Torkuase =

- Country: Ghana
- Region: Greater Accra Region

Torkuase is a town in the Greater Accra Region of Ghana. The town is known for the Torkuase Secondary School. The school is a second cycle institution.
