= Nanton Senior High/Technical School =

School in Ghana

Nanton Senior High/Technical School is a newly established Senior High School in the Nanton District which was formerly part of the Savelugu - Nanton Municipal District in the northern region of Ghana. It started fully operational on the 5th of March 2024

The school is a mixed-gender school located in the District Capital, Nanton . The residential status of the school is Day and Boarding. The school belongs to category C Type in the Ghana Senior High School selection status.

== Programs offered ==
Though the school has just started operational, it offers the following programs;

- Business
- General Arts
- Home Economics
- Technical
