= Esase Bontefufuo =

Esaase Bontefufuo
- Country: Ghana
- Region: Ashanti Region

Esase Bontefufuo is a town located at the Amansie-West District in the Ashanti Region of Ghana. The town is known for the Esase Bontefufuo Secondary School. The school is a second cycle institution.
