= Koase =

Coordinates: 7°41′N 2°06′W

- Interactive map of Koase
- Country: Ghana
- Region: Brong Ahafo Region

Koase is a town in the Brong Ahafo Region of Ghana. The town is known for the Koase Secondary Technical School (KOSTECH). The school is located on the Techiman to Wenchi road. The population of the school from the current survey 3 July 2016 is four hundred and seventy four (474). The school was established on 28 January 1991. It was a community based school formed by the formal Head of State Jerry John Rawlins. Before then it was a middle school which was established by the Prime Minister Kofi Abrefa Busia. The school is a second cycle institution.
