= Lycée Français International Jacques Prévert d'Accra =

French international school in East Legon, Ghana

- East Legon; Ghana

Information
- School type: International School
- Established: 1963
- Language: French
- Website: https://lfaccra.com/

Lycée Français International Jacques Prévert d'Accra is a French international school in East Legon in the Greater Accra Region of Ghana. It is affiliated with the Embassy of France in Accra and serves maternelle (preschool) through lycée (senior high school).

== History ==
The Association des Parents d’Elèves ("Association of Parents of Students") established the school in 1963 to educate children of French embassy employees. It was originally on the property of the embassy's cultural service. From 1975 to June 2000, it occupied a rented property in Roman Ridge before moving to its current location.

In 2000, the school was named after the 20th-century French poet and screenwriter Jacques Prévert.

A new athletic facility opened in 2016.

== See also ==
- Education in Ghana
- List of senior high schools in Ghana
