= Dzolo =

Dzolo (also Ave-Dzolo) is a village with 4,000 residents near the town of Kévé in southwest Togo.

== Exonomy ==
The primary economic activity in the village is agriculture; its principal crops are peanuts, corn, pineapple, and manioc. It used to be twinned with Saint-Jean-de-Maurienne, France.
