= Obrakyere =

Coordinates: 5°39′N 0°35′W

- Town
- Interactive map of Obrakyere
- Country: Ghana
- Region: Central Region

Obrakyere is a town in the Central Region of Ghana. The town is known for the Obrakyere Secondary Technical School. The school is a second cycle institution.
