= Abundant Grace Academy =

Coordinates: 5.566083°N 0.214417°W

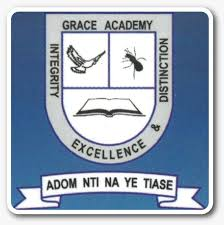
- Accra, Ghana

Information
- School type: Independent school
- Founded: 1997
- Founder: Rev. Charles Ansah-Owusu
- Grades: 9–12
- Gender: Co-Educational
- Language: English

Abundant Grace Academy is a private senior secondary school located in the centre of Accra, Ghana, established in 1997 by Rev. Charles Ansah-Owusu.

The Academy eventually transitioned into a comprehensive secondary school dedicated to transforming academic performance and providing holistic Christian education.
