= Nuriya Islamic Senior High School =

Public school in Ghana

Nuriya Islamic Senior High School (also known as NURISEC) is a public mixed-gender second-cycle institution at Gukpegu-Tua in the Tamale Metropolis in the Northern region of Ghana. It is categorized as a Category C school within the Ghana Education Service (GES) classification. It was established in September 2019. The school WAEC registration code is 0080132.

== History ==
Nurisec started as a private senior high school which got absorbed as a government-assisted missionary school in 2019.

== Programmes and Hall of Residence ==
Nurisec offers three (3) programmes: General Arts, General Science and Home Economics. The students are given halls of residence that are identified by Bawumia House, Gukpegu House, Nkrumah House, Dakpema House and Bayaan House.
