= Mafi-Kumasi =

Mafi-Kumase
- Town
- Location in Ghana
- Coordinates: 6°16′16″N 0°34′07″E
- Country: Ghana
- Region: Volta Region
- District: Central Tongu District

Population (2010)
  - Total: 2,461

Mafi-Kumase to Sogakope

is a town in the Volta Region of Ghana. It is located in the Central Tongu District. According to the Ghana Statistical Service's 2010 Population and Housing Census, the population of Mafi-Kumase was 2,461.

The town is known for the Mafi-Kumase Senior High Technical School and the commercial production of Garri|Gari. One of the largest and most attended markets in the Volta region is the Mafi-Kumase market. It normally operates every Monday. The people are basically farmers and very hardworking. The school is a second cycle institution.
