= Pong-Tamale Senior High School =

School in Ghana

Coordinates: 9°40′59″N 0°49′39″W

Pong-Tamale Senior High School, also known as PONGTASS or PONTASS, is a co-educational second cycle boarding school in Pong-Tamale, a suburb of Savelugu Municipality in the Northern Region of Ghana. It was established in 1991 with a total student population of 18 with the aim to produce students to feed the Pong Tamale Veterinary College.The school is also mix-gender school.It is also a category C school under the Ghana Education Service placement. Pong-Tamale Senior High School is a rural-based school. It is located at Pong-Tamale along the Tamale-Bolgatanga main road. It is at the right hand side of the road when entering into the town (Pong-Tamale). The main colour of the school is White and Green.

=== Courses offered ===
- General Science,
- General Arts,
- Agricultural Science,
- Home Economics,
- Business and
- Visual Arts.
