= Ashaiman Senior High School =

Location
- P. O. Box 304 Ashaiman; Middle East - Ashaiman, Greater Accra. Greater Accra Region; Ashaiman, P. O. BOX 304 ASHAIMAN; Ghana; 5°41′47.5″N 0°01′06.6″W

Information
- School type: Public high school Senior High Scool
- Motto: "Till the Prize is Won"
- Denomination: Non-Denominational
- Established: September 1990
- Status: Active
- School district: Ashaiman Municipality
- Oversight: Ministry of Education
- School code: 0010203
- Head of school: Mrs. Jemima Quarshie
- Chaplain: Rev. Nickson-Nubour
- Years offered: 1-3
- Classes offered: Agricultural science, Home Economics, General Science, General arts, Business, Visual arts,
- Hours in school day: 10 hours
- Campus size: 200 meters square
- Slogan: Till The Prize is Won!!!!
- Nickname: GREAT ASHAISEC
- Affiliation: Ghana
- Alumni: ASSOSA

Ashaiman Senior High School, also known as Great Ashaisec, is a category C public coeducational second-cycle institution at Ashaiman in the Greater Accra Region of Ghana.The purpose of the establishment of this school was to cater for a large number of JHS graduates from Ashaiman and its environs who needed to benefit from Senior High Education in Ghana.

== History ==
Ashaiman Senior High School was established in September 1990 with thirty (30) students, two teachers and no non-teaching staff. Ashaiman Senior High School (formerly, Ashaiman Secondary School) is located at Ashaiman, Middle East, Greater Accra, in between the Ashaiman roundabout and the Mandela park. This school was established by the PNDC Government when saw the need to cater for a large number of Junior Secondary School graduates from Ashaiman and its environs who wanted to benefit from Senior Secondary Education in Ghana.

The first headmaster of the school is Mr. C. M. Amekugee, B.A. (Hons) who was a Geography teacher at Nungua Secondary School at the time. The first batch of students admitted by the school summed up to thirty (30) students where the school operated two (2) programmes; Agricultural Science and Vocational Skills (Home Economics and Visual Arts) with five teachers which were Mr. Alfred Sakplavi-Biko, Mr. Peter Droefenu, Mr. Emmanuel Ofoe Fiemawhle, Mr. Jerome Courage Kwadzodei, Mrs. Cynthia Obuo Nti, Mr. Kojo Kafui Ayibor with no non-teaching staff. During late November and early December 1993, the number of admitted students had increased from 30 to 179 and these were the first who sat the Senior Secondary School Certificate Examination (SSCE).

As at 2025, the student population of Ashaiman SHS amounts to 1,246 with 71.1% constituting females and 28.9% constituting males. As for the staff, its number stands at 120, comprising 99 teaching and 21 non-teaching personnel.

== School code ==
The Ghana Education Service has assigned the code 0010203 for administrative purposes, including student registrations, placements, and national examinations such as the West African Senior School Certificate Examination (WASSCE) to Anlo Senior High School.

== School motto and core values ==
The official motto of Ashaiman Senior High School is "Till The Prize Is Won" which was adopted after its former motto "Modernization calls for change" became indisposed.

Also, the core values of the school include Discipline, Teamwork, Hard work, Integrity, Excellence and Respect.

== Academic programs and extra-curricular activities ==
The academic programs of Ashaiman Senior High School which functions within the standard three-year Senior High School (SHS) curriculum framework established by Ghana's National Council for Curriculum and Assessment (NaCCA) are six in number and are as follows;

- Agriculture
- Business
- Home Economics
- Visual Arts
- General Arts
- General Science

Also, extra-curricular activities at Ashaiman Senior High School include Maths & Science Quiz Club, Mathematics Club, Health Club, Cadet, Quiz and Debating Club, School Choir, Drama Club, Football Club, Adolescent Club, Peer Counselors Club etc.

== Houses ==
The school has four houses, and these are;

- Mensah House
- Ayibonte House
- Ashai House
- Astladi House

== Achievements ==
Notable achievements of Ashaisec include;

- 2025 Farmers' Day Best Secondary School in Agriculture.
- Winners of the maiden edition of public speaking and Debate competition organized by Speech Forces in collaboration with G.E.S and T.TEL. at the University of Ghana.

== See also ==
- Education in Ghana
- List of schools in Ghana
