= Abeaseman Community Day Senior High School =

School in Abease, Ghana

Coordinates: 7.9537°N 1.1666°W

Abeaseman Community Day Senior High School is a second cycle institution located in Abease in the Pru East District in the Bono East Region of Ghana. it is a mixed school with a population of 731.

The school was established in 2016. It is among the E-blocks community Senior High Schools built by the President of Ghana, His Excellency John Dramani Mahama. The School first started as a private senior high which was managed by the Abeaseman Community until it was later absorbed by the government.

Abeaseman Community Day Senior High School ranks 563 at the National level, 19 at the Regional level and 3 at the District level.

The motto of the school is First Among Equals.

== Mission ==
The school stands to provide brilliant and excellent education for young individuals in terms of cognitive abilities, thinking abilities and psychomotor skills competencies with sound moral training to help student become better version of themselves for the benefit of the society as a whole.

== Vision ==
To be a Senior High School of choice providing access to qualified students through the creation of an enabling and serene environment for learning and instrilling a sense of self-reliance.

== Courses ==
1. Business
2. General Agriculture
3. General Arts
4. General Science
5. Home Economics
6. Visual Arts

== School Code ==
0060406

== Accommodation ==
Day

== Gender ==
Mixed

== School Category ==
Category C
