= Dawurampon =

- Town
- Country: Ghana
- Region: Central Region

Dawuroampong is a town in the Central region of Ghana. The town is known for the Gomoa Secondary and Technical School. The school is a second cycle institution.
