= Patasi, Kumasi =

Patasi
- Suburb
- Location in Ghana
- Coordinates: 6°7′N 1°7′W
- Country: Ghana
- Region: Ashanti Region
- District: Kumasi Metropolitan District

Patasi is suburb of Kumasi. Kumasi is the regional capital of the Ashanti Region of Ghana. It is a residential area in the Kumasi Metropolitan Assembly. It is about 7 kilometres eastwards from centre of the regional capital.

== Notable place ==
The town has various hotels and guest houses. Some of them are:

- Hotel Rexmar
- Marigold Hotel
- Star Guest House
