= Tema Manhean =

Town in Ghana

Tema Manhean is one of the indigenous towns in the industrialized parts of Greater Accra Region, Ghana. Since it is the Greater Accra Region, they speak Ga. The name "Manhean" is the anglicized form of the local phrase "man hee" which means new town or community.

The Tema Harbour is found there; the main occupation of the people in the town is fishing. The festival celebrated in this town in Homowo. There is also a festival called "Kpelejoo" which is annually celebrated around Easter time. There are two main senior high schools in the town: Tema Manhean Senior High School and Tema Manhean Anglican Senior High School. A lighthouse and naval base can also be found there. There are several communities within the town. They include: Awudum, Ashamang, Abornkor {is the anglicized form of the local phrase" abrewa nkor" meaning, an old lady can not go. It used to be a rocky place} Zeginshour, Manhean, Banku man and Ayigbe town. The people in Awudum and Ayigbe town are closer to the sea and are mostly involved in fishing.

The people of Tema manhean are the custodians of the Lands in the who of Tema.
