= Fodoa =

New Fodowa Fodoa
- Urban area
- Location within Ghana
- Coordinates: 6°36′00″N 0°53′00″W
- Country: Ghana
- Region: Eastern Region
- District: West Akim District
- Time zone: GMT
  - Summer (DST): GMT

Fodoa or Fodowa is a town in the Kwahu West Municipal District of the Eastern Region of Ghana.

== Location ==
It is located along the Accra - Kumasi Highway near Nkawkaw.

Kwahu-Fodoa Community Day Senior High School is located in Fodoa, the school was in inaugurated by President John Dramani Mahama as part 200 community SHS project.
