= Assin Asempaneye =

- Town
- Country: Ghana
- Region: Central Region

Assin Asempaneye is a town in the assin north district in the Central Region of Ghana. The town is known for the Assin North Secondary Technical School which was established in the year 1985. The school is a second cycle institution.
