= Kwahu West Municipal District =

- Municipal District
- Seal

- Districts of Eastern Region

- Location of Kwahu West Municipal District within Eastern
- Coordinates: 6°33′N 0°46′W
- Country: Ghana
- Region: Eastern
- Capital: Nkawkaw

Government
  - Municipal Chief Executive: Yaw Owusu Addo

Population (2021)
  - Total: 145,429
- Time zone: UTC+0 (GMT)

Kwahu West Municipal District is one of the thirty-three districts in Eastern Region, Ghana. Originally it was formerly part of the then-larger Kwahu South District in 1988, which was created from the former Kwahu District Council, until the southwest part of the district was split off to create Kwahu West District in August 2004; which it later was elevated to municipal district assembly status on 1 July 2007 (effectively 29 February 2008) to become Kwahu West Municipal District. The municipality is located in the western part of Eastern Region and has Nkawkaw as its capital town.

== List of settlements ==
Settlements of Kwahu West Municipal District
No.	Settlement	Population	Population year
1	Asona		
2	Apesika		
3	Asuboni No.3		
4	Asuboni Rail		
5	Atibie Amanfrom		
6	Ekowso		
7	Fodoa		
8	Jejeti		
9	Kwahudaa		
10	Kwahu Nsaba		
11	Mpraeso Amanfrom	2,000	2001
12	Nkawkaw	61,785	2013
13	Nkwanda No. 1		
14	Nkwanda No.2		
15	Obomeng Odumase		
16	Oframase		
17	Wisiwisi		

== Sources ==
- "Kwahu West Municipal District". Statoids.
- Districts: Kwahu West Municipal District, Kwahu Kwamang
