= Ekowso =

Ekowso is a town located in the Kwahu West Municipal District of the Eastern Region of Ghana.

== Location ==
It is located along the Nkawkaw - New Abirim road.
