= Asona (disambiguation) =

Asona may refer to:

- Asona, one of the eight Akan Clans
- Asona Town, A town in the Eastern Region of Ghana
