= Nkawkaw =

Town in Eastern Region of Ghana

- Town
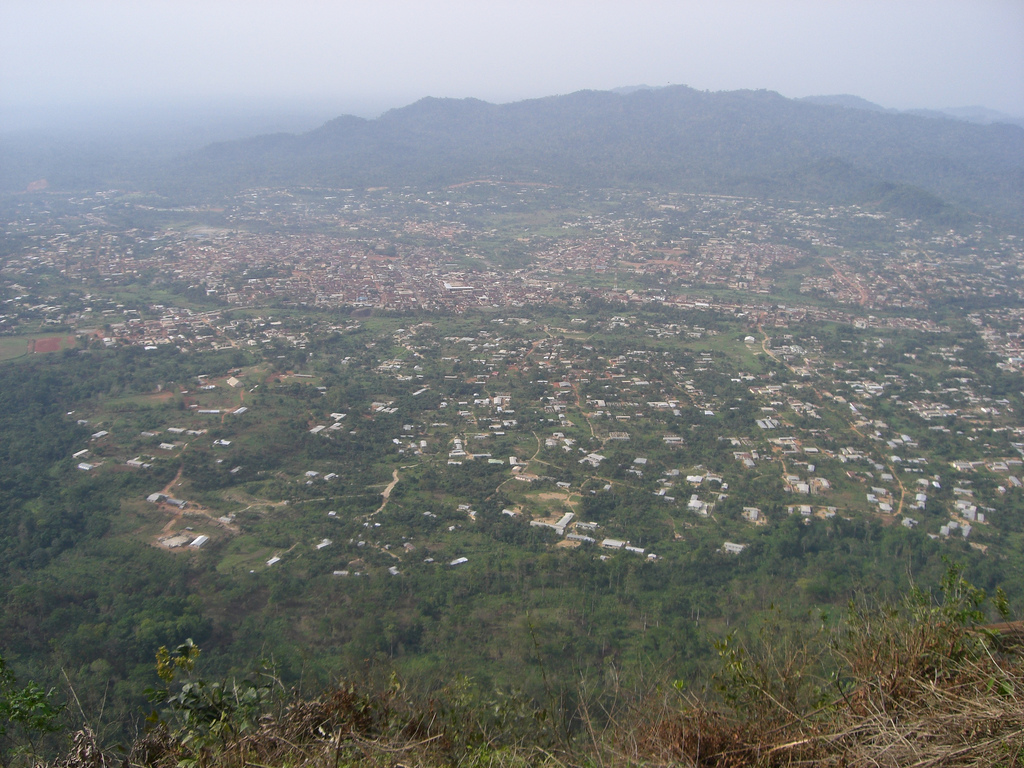
- Nkawkaw as seen from hills

- Kwahu West Municipal District logo

- Location of Nkawkaw in Eastern Region, Ghana
- Coordinates: 6°33′N 0°46′W
- Country: Ghana
- Region: Eastern Region
- District: Kwahu West Municipal

Population (2013)
  - Total: 61,785
- Time zone: GMT
  - Summer (DST): GMT

Nkawkaw is a town in southern Ghana and is the capital of Kwahu West Municipal, an area in the Eastern Region of south Ghana. Nkawkaw has a 2013 settlement population of 61,785 people. Nkawkaw is also described as a city in a valley as it the gateway to ascend the Kwahu mountains. Hon. Joseph Frempong is the current member of parliament for the Kwahu West who was elected in the 2020 elections.

== Geography ==
Nkawkaw is situated on the road and former railway between Accra and Kumasi, and lies about halfway between these cities. It is also connected by road to Koforidua and Konongo. Nkawkaw is one of the major towns of the Kwahu Mountains. Historically it is not considered as a Kwahu town because it is not on top of the mountain range. According to the 2013 census Nkawkaw has a settlement population of 61,785.

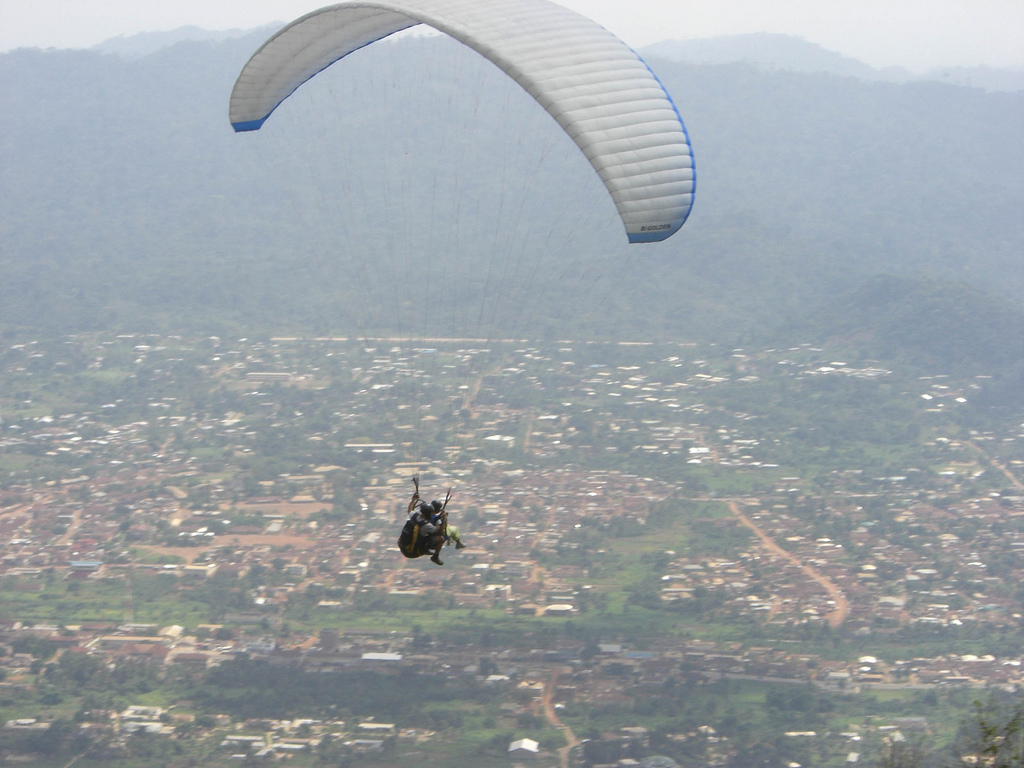
Paragliding in Nkawkaw

== Sports ==
Nkawkaw is the location of football team Okwawu United and is also the location of the Nkawkaw Park (stadium).

== Health ==
- Holy Family Hospital

== Climate ==
Climate data for Nkawkaw
Month	Jan	Feb	Mar	Apr	May	Jun	Jul	Aug	Sep	Oct	Nov	Dec	Year
Mean daily maximum °C (°F)	39.0 (102.2)	36.6 (97.9)	39.0 (102.2)	36.0 (96.8)	33.0 (91.4)	32.0 (89.6)	31.0 (87.8)	33.0 (91.4)	32.0 (89.6)	33.0 (91.4)	39.0 (102.2)	33.6 (92.5)	39.0 (102.2)
Mean daily minimum °C (°F)	17.4 (63.3)	12.7 (54.9)	13.3 (55.9)	9.8 (49.6)	10.8 (51.4)	12.5 (54.5)	14.3 (57.7)	13.3 (55.9)	8.8 (47.8)	14.6 (58.3)	12.8 (55.0)	13.8 (56.8)	12.7 (54.9)
Average precipitation mm (inches)	5.1 (0.2)	28 (1.1)	23 (0.9)	61 (2.4)	51 (2.0)	61 (2.4)	71 (2.8)	15 (0.6)	25 (1.0)	110 (4.2)	7.6 (0.3)	30 (1.2)	490 (19.1)
Source: Meoweather.com

== Notable people ==
- George Boateng, football player
- Raphael Dwamena, football player
