= Kwahu Nsaba =

Kwahu Nsaba is a town in the Kwahu west District in the Eastern region of Ghana.

The town is known for the production of earthenware bowl (called "Ayiwa" in the Akan language).

== Location ==
Kwahu Nsaba is located along the Accra - Kumasi Highway.
