= Afram =

Afram River
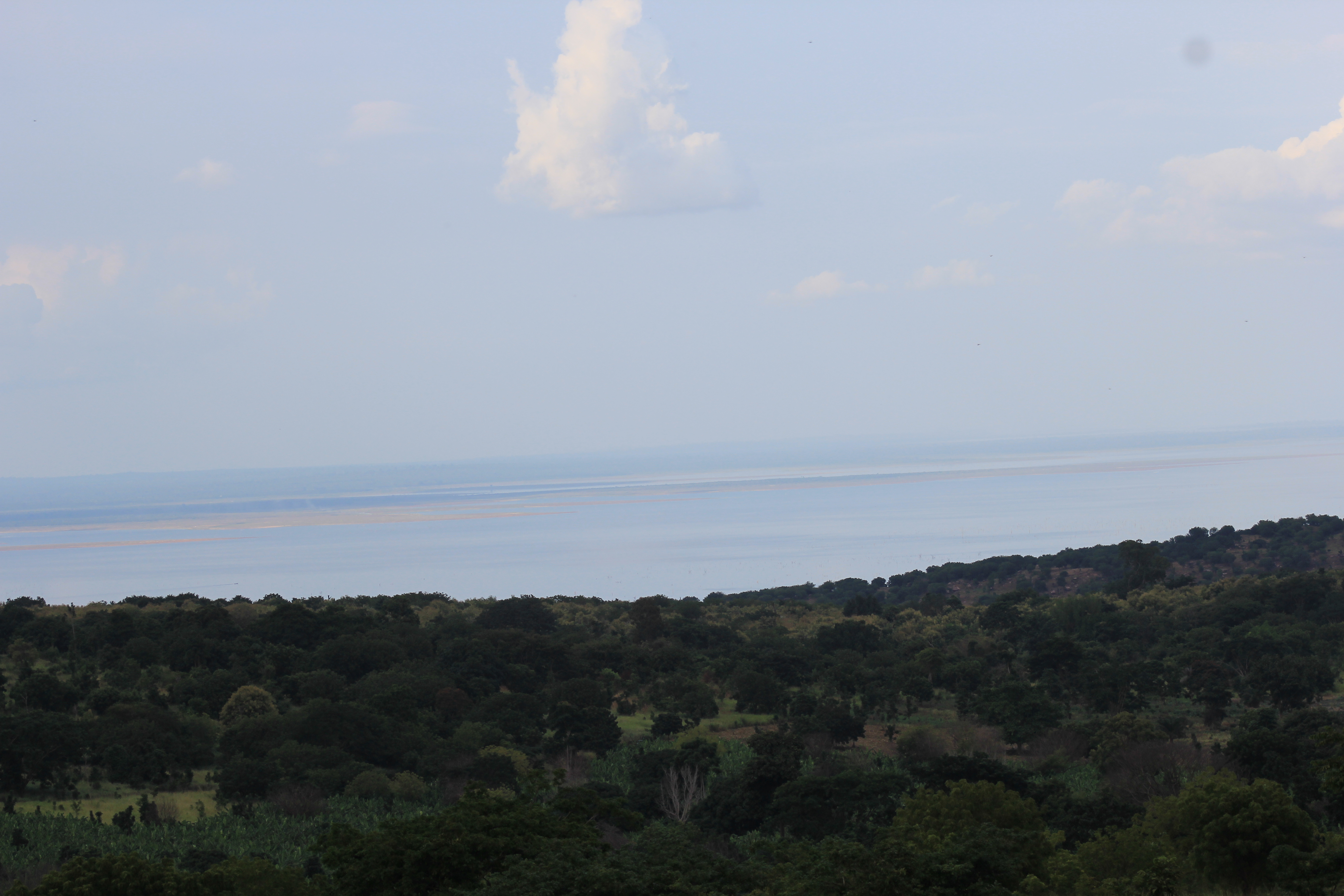
- Afram River which binds with the Volta Lake.

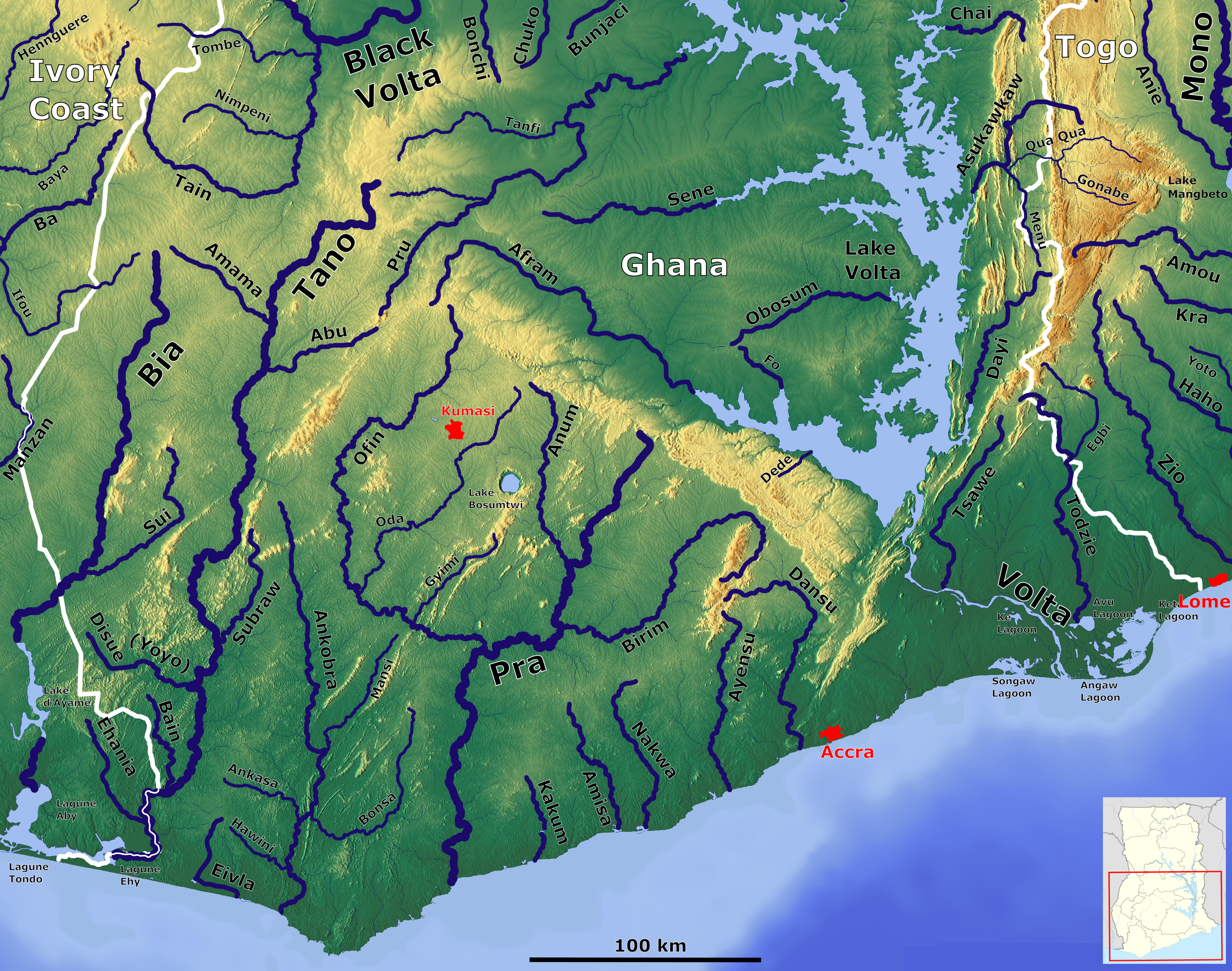
- South Ghana with the Afram (center)

Location
- Country: Ghana

Physical characteristics
- Mouth: Volta River
  - location: Lake Volta
  - coordinates: 6°50′53″N 0°43′25″W
- Basin size: 1,000 km^{2} (390 sq mi)
- Discharge
  - location: Mouth

The Afram River is a 100-kilometre (62 mi) river in Ghana. Prior to the construction of the Akosombo Dam in the 1960s, the Afram is a principal tributary of the Volta River and today is an equally important tributary of Lake Volta. The river runs roughly in a southwesterly direction. It collects all the drainage of the Kwahu Plateau.
