= Mpraeso Amanfrom =

Mpraeso Amanfrom is a town in the Kwahu West Municipal District of the Eastern Region of Ghana. The population is about 2,000 people, mostly Kwahus. Main occupations include farming and making pottery.
