= Asuboni No.3 =

Town in the Eastern Region of Ghana

Asuboni No.3 is a town located in the Kwahu West Municipal District of the Eastern Region of Ghana known for the Asuboni Waterfall, a natural tourist attraction.
