= Asuboni Rails =

Town in the Eastern Region of Ghana

Coordinates: 6.471°N 0.731°W

Asuboni Rails is a town located in the Kwahu West Municipal District of the Eastern Region of Ghana.

The town is named after the Asuboni River and the presence of a rail line in the town.

== Location ==
It is located along the defunct Accra–Kumasi railway line.
