= Nkawkaw Park =

Sports venue in Nkawkaw, Ghana

- Interactive map of Nkawkaw Park
- Location: Nkawkaw, Eastern Region, Ghana
- Coordinates: 6.5568595°N 0.7574025°W
- Capacity: 5,000

Tenant
- Okwawu United

Nkawkaw Park is a multi-use stadium in Nkawkaw, Eastern Region, Ghana. The stadium holds 5,000 people.

== Stadium usage ==
The stadium is used mostly for football matches and many other sporting events.

== Residence ==
The stadium is the home stadium of Okwawu United of the Poly Tank Division One League.
