= Jejeti =

Jejeti New Gyegyeti
- Urban area
- Location within Ghana
- Coordinates: 6°28′28″N 0°39′0″W
- Country: Ghana
- Region: Eastern Region
- District: West Akim District
- Time zone: GMT
  - Summer (DST): GMT

Jejeti is a town in the Atiwa East of the Eastern Region of Ghana.
