= Asona Town =

Asona
- Urban area
- Country: Ghana
- Region: Eastern Region
- District: East Akim District
- Time zone: GMT
  - Summer (DST): GMT

Asona is a town in the Eastern Region of Ghana.
