= Kwahu Plateau =

Plateau in southern Ghana

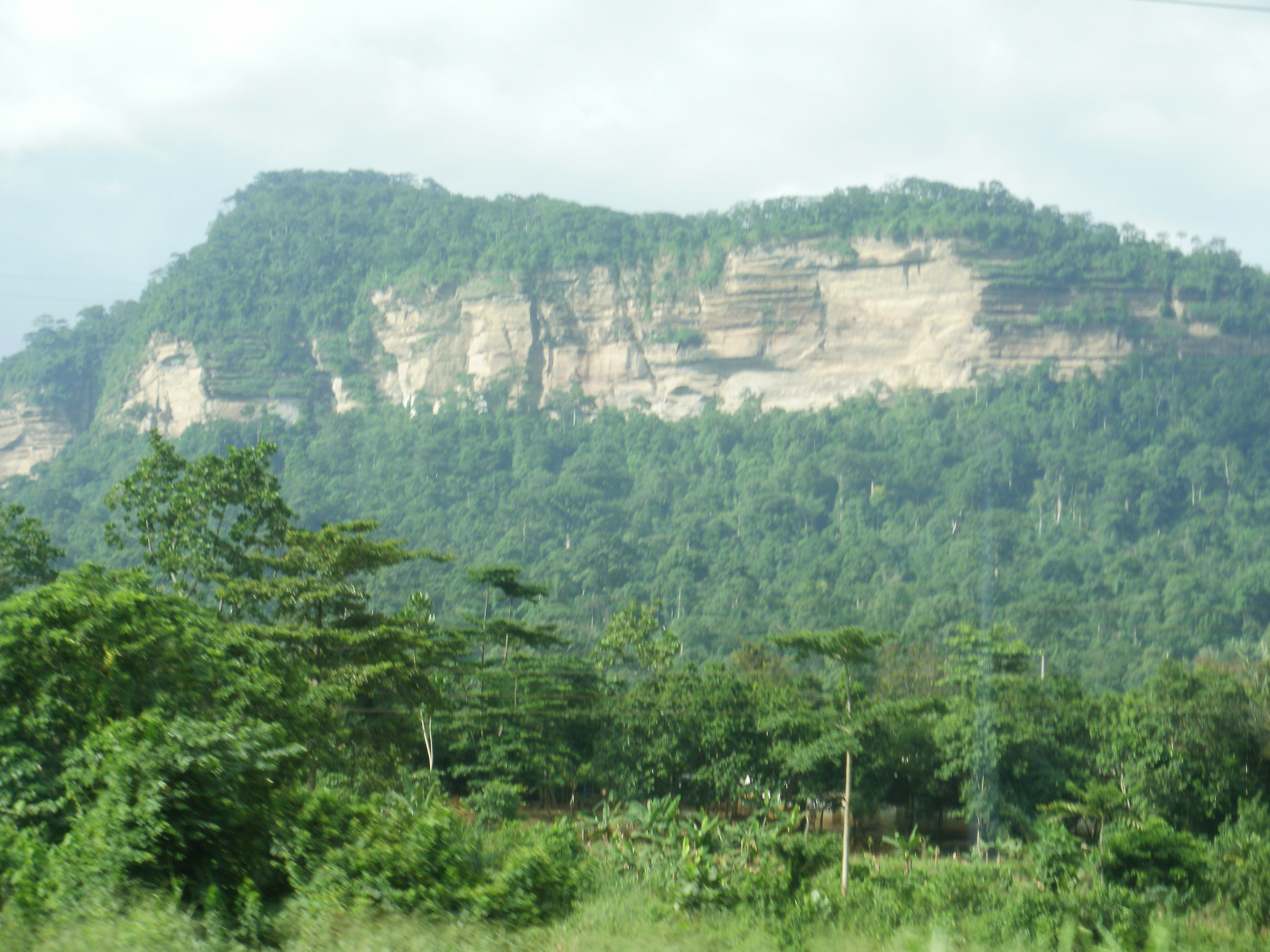

Highest point
- Peak: Mount Akmawa
- Coordinates: 6.58°N 0.729722°W

Geography
- Location: Ghana

The Kwahu Plateau is a 260 km (160 mi) long plateau in southern Ghana. It consists of the uplifted southern edge of the Volta River Basin. It forms the main watershed of Ghana, separating rivers in the Volta River system from rivers in the western half of Ghana which flows into the Atlantic Ocean (Birim, Pra, Ankobra). The plateau has an average elevation of 1,500 feet and its highest point is Mount Akmawa at 2,586 feet. The plateau is dissected by several valleys and is marked by towering peaks. To the south it borders dense forest country, which it shields from the harmattan winds of the interior. Cacao cultivation has been introduced in the west, through which traditional trade routes lead to the Atlantic; vegetable cultivation is stressed in the eastern sector. The largest and most important towns on the Kwahu Plateau are Wenchi, Mampong, Mpraeso, and Abetifi.
