= Agona (disambiguation) =

Agona may refer to:

== Towns ==
- Agona, Sekyere South District, Ghana
- Agona Swedru, Agona West Municipal District, Ghana
- Agona Nkwanta, Ahanta West District, Afigya kwabere
- Agona East District, in the Central Region of Ghana
- Agona West Municipal District, in the Central Region of Ghana
