= Asikuma-Odoben-Brakwa (Ghana parliament constituency) =

Constituency in the Central Region of Ghana

- constituency for the Parliament of Ghana
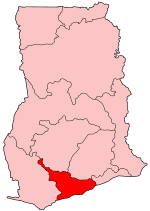
- District: Asikuma-Odoben-Brakwa
- Region: Central Region of Ghana

Current constituency
- Party: National Democratic Congress
- MP: Alhassan Kobina Ghansah

Asikuma-Odoben-Brakwa is one of the constituencies represented in the Parliament of Ghana. It elects one member of parliament (MP) by the first past the post system of election. The Asikuma-Odoben-Brakwa constituency is located in the Asikuma-Odoben-Brakwa district of the Central Region of Ghana.

== Boundaries ==
The seat is located entirely within the district of the same name in the Central Region of Ghana.

== Members of Parliament ==
First elected	Member	Party
1954	Anthony Seibu Alec Abban (Ajumako-Asikuma)	Convention People's Party
1965	Kodwo Sam Annan (Asikuma)	Convention People's Party
1992	Ebenezer Kobina Fosu	National Democratic Congress
2000	Paul Collins Appiah Ofori	New Patriotic Party
2012	Georgina Nkrumah Aboah	National Democratic Congress
2016	Anthony Effah	New Patriotic Party
2020	Alhaji Alhassan Ghansah	National Democratic Congress

== See also ==
- List of Ghana Parliament constituencies
- Agona District
