= Breman-Ajumako-Enyan District =

Breman-Ajumako-Enyan District Council
- Former District Council
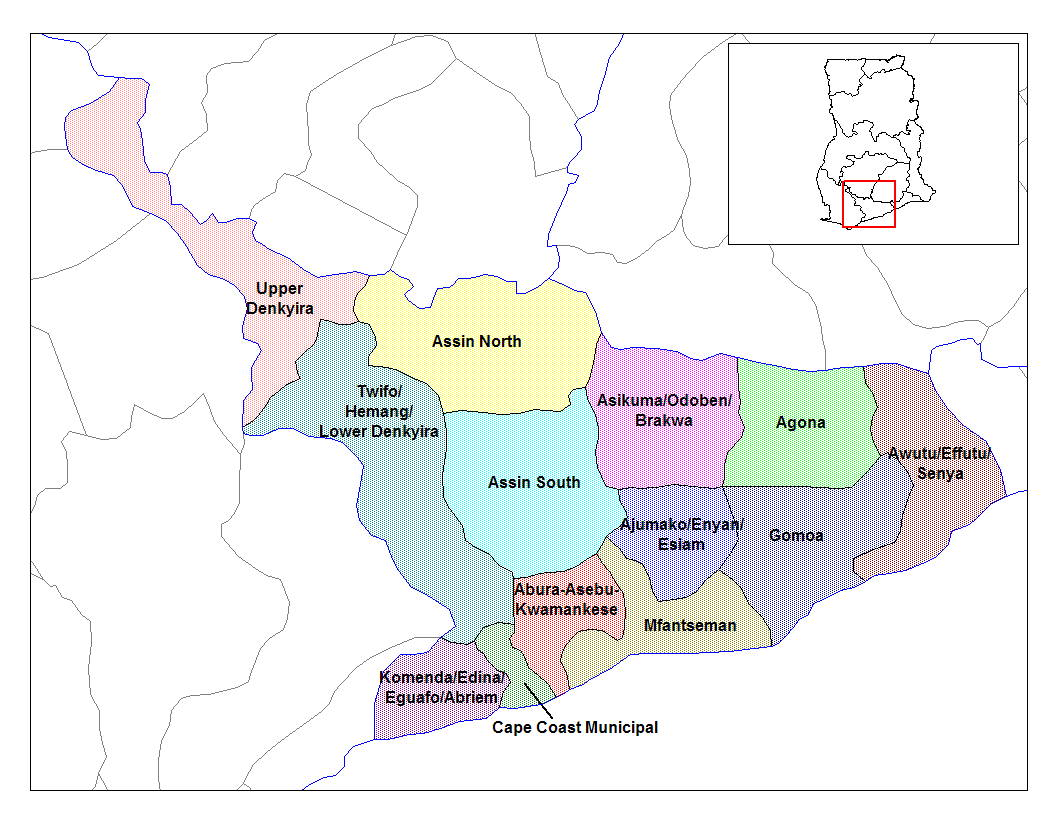
- Districts of Central Region

- Location of Breman-Ajumako-Enyan District Council within Central
- Coordinates: 5°34′51.96″N 0°59′39.84″W
- Country: Ghana
- Region: Central
- Capital: Breman Asikuma
- Time zone: UTC+0 (GMT)
- ISO 3166 code: GH-CP-__

Breman-Ajumako-Enyan District is a former district council that was located in Central Region, Ghana. Originally created as a district council in 1975. However, on 1978, it was split off into two new district councils: Asikuma/Odoben/Brakwa District Council (capital Breman Asikuma) and Ajumako/Enyan/Essiam District Council (capital Ajumako). The district council was located in the northeast part of Central Region and had Breman Asikuma as its capital town.
