= Andrews Quansah =

Ghana footballer (born 1960)

Personal information
- Full name: Andrews Quansah
- Date of birth: 23 March 1960 (age 66)
- Place of birth: Agona Nsaba, Central Region, Ghana
- Height: 6 ft 2 in (1.88 m)
- Position: Goalkeeper

Senior career*
Years	Team	Apps	(Gls)
1982–1984	Great Olympics		
1984–1986	Hearts of Oak		
1986–1987	Okwawu United		

International career
??-??	Ghana Black Meteors		
??-??	Ghana Black Stars		
- * Club domestic league appearances and goals

Andrews Quansah (born 23 March 1960), is a retired Ghanaian footballer who played as a goalkeeper.

== Career ==
=== Playing career ===
Andrews Quansah started his football career in 1970 with Back Arrows team in Tema. During his time he played for Accra Hearts of Oak, Great Olympics, Okwawu United, etc. He was part of the Black Meteors during the time of Mohammed Adu And Kwesi Appiah and won a medal around that time.

He has played with teammates such as Joe Amoateng, George Lamptey, Abedi Pele, James Kwesi Appiah among others.

=== Coaching career ===
Andrews coached Prisco F.C, a Tema-based football club in Ghana.
