= Paul Collins Appiah Ofori =

Ghanaian politician

Hon. Paul Collins Appiah Ofori

Member of the Ghana Parliament for Asikuma-Odoben-Brakwa
- In office January 1996 – Jan 2013
- Preceded by: Jacob Emmanuel Oppong

Member of Parliament
- In office 7 January 2005 – 6 January 2009
- President: John Kufour

Member of Parliament
- In office 7 January 2009 – 6 January 2013
- President: John Atta Mills
- Succeeded by: Georgina Nkrumah Aboah

Personal details
- Born: 14 August 1943 (age 83) Ghana
- Party: New Patriotic Party
- Education: ICSA, London
- Occupation: Managers/Administrators

Paul Collins Appiah Ofori is a Ghanaian politician and was the Member of Parliament for the Asikuma-Odoben-Brakwa electorate in the Central Region of Ghana.

== Early life and education ==
Appiah-Ofori was born on 19 August 1943. He hails from Breman Asikuma in the Central Region of Ghana. He graduated from the Institute of Chartered Secretaries and Administrators, London.

== Employment ==
Appiah-Ofori worked as the chief executive officer for SIO Industries in Asaba, Delta State, Nigeria from 1987 to 1996.

== Politics ==
He was first chosen to speak and be a representative to the body electorate in 1996 and held his seat in the 2000, 2004 and 2008 Ghanaian parliamentary political decision elections. He is an individual from the New Patriotic Party. He was elected as the member of parliament for the Asikuma-Odoben-Brakwa constituency in the 5th parliament of the 4th republic of Ghana. He was elected with 18,908 out of the 37,015 valid votes cast, equivalent to 48.9% of the total valid votes cast. He was elected against Georgina Nkrumah Aboah of the National Democratic Congress, Anthony Robert Frempong of the Democratic Freedom Party and Comfort Willson Aggrey of the Convention People's Party. These obtained 47.88%, 1.29% and 1.95% respectively of total valid votes cast.

== Personal life ==
Appiah-Ofori is married with three children. He is a Christian(Methodist).
