= Anthony Effah =

Ghanaian politician

Hon. Anthony Effah MP

Member of the Ghana Parliament for Asikuma Odoben Brakwa Constituency
- Incumbent
- Assumed office 7 January 2017
- President: Nana Akuffo-Addo

Personal details
- Born: Anthony Effah; 24 January 1960 (age 66) Breman-Brakwa, Ghana
- Party: New Patriotic Party
- Education: University of Ghana
- Occupation: Politician
- Profession: Banker
- Committees: Finance Committee

Anthony Effah is a Ghanaian politician and member of the Seventh Parliament of the Fourth Republic of Ghana representing the Asikuma-Odoben-Brakwa Constituency in the Central Region on the ticket of the New Patriotic Party.

== Early life and education ==
Effah was born on 24 January 1960 and hails from Breman-Brakwa in the Central Region of Ghana. He had his bachelor's degree in economics in 1985 and also his Executive Masters' in Business Administration (Finance) from the University of Ghana in 2003.

== Career ==
Effah was the Director of Risk Management and Compliance at Fidelity Bank in Accra. He was also the chairman of the Board of Governors of the Brakwa-Breman Rural Bank.

== Politics ==
Effah is a member of New Patriotic Party. He was the member of Parliament for Asikuma Odoben Brakwa Constituency in the Central Region from 2017 to 2021. He won the parliamentary seat in the 2016 Ghanaian general elections with 23,760 votes making 50.1% of the total votes cast whilst the NDC parliamentary candidate Alhassan Kobina Ghansah had 23,330 votes making 49.2% of the total votes cast, the PPP parliamentary candidate Richard Ato Quinoo had 237 votes making 0.5% of the total votes cast and the CPP parliamentary candidate Hayford Amoakoh had 90 votes making 0.2% of the total votes cast.

In 2019, he was a member of the Finance Committee.

== Personal life ==
Effah is a Christian.
