= Ajumako/Enyan/Essiam District =

- Former District
- Seal

- Districts of Central Region

- Location of Ajumako/Enyan/Essiam District within Central
- Coordinates: 5°27′48.96″N 0°56′12.48″W
- Country: Ghana
- Region: Central
- Capital: Ajumako

Government
  - District Executive: Andrew Kojo Dodoo

Area
  - Total: 483 km^{2} (186 sq mi)

Population (2021)
  - Total: 120,586
  - Density: 250/km^{2} (647/sq mi)
- Time zone: UTC+0 (GMT)
- ISO 3166 code: GH-CP-AJ

Ajumako/Enyan/Essiam District is one of the twenty-two districts in Central Region, Ghana. Originally created as an ordinary district assembly in 1988, which was created from the Breman-Ajumako-Enyan District Council from 1974 to 1978. The district assembly was located in the northeast part of Central Region and had Ajumako as its capital town.

== Facts of interests ==
The University of Education, Winneba has a campus at Ajumako. The natives are Fante except the people of Breman Essiam who trace their lineage to Breman, near Kumasi. The main occupation of the people is farming with emerging markets at Breman Essiam and Ajumako. The current Member of parliament of the district is Cassiel Ato Forson.

== Infrastructure and Services ==
The district boasts of four trunk roads that meet at Ajumako but feeder roads are narrow and inaccessible during rainfall seasons which constrains market access and farm productivity. They include gross post-harvest losses arising from shoddy storage and outdated processing facilities. All these communities are served by only one rural bank, the Enyan Denkyira Rural Bank having branches in, Ajumako, Bisease, Ochiso and Abaasa. In agriculture and livestock farming, extension service is facing resource financing challenge where the number of agents available is only 11 compared to the needed 32 and thereby giving a ratio of 1farmer to 1071 agent.

Ajumako is served by a central hospital and five sub-district clinics (Abaasa, Bisease, Kwanyanko, Sonkwa, Nkwantanum, and Ajumako) and CHPS compounds. The prevalent health problems are malaria, typhoid, anemia among the pregnant women, poor family planning (uptake), and ineffective TB detection. Notable secondary and technical schools in education are; Bisease SHS, Enyan Denkyira SHS, Enyan Maim Community SHS, Ajumako SHS, Enyan Abaasa Technical Institute, Mando SHS and University of Education, Winneba (Ajumako campus). Later in December 2020, it launched a 30‑member Girls Education Network to increase enrolment, retention, performance, and transitions to higher education.

== List of settlements ==
Settlements of Ajumako/Enyan/Essiam District
No.	Settlement	Population	Population year
1	Enyan Abaasa		
2	Ajumako		
3	Ajumako Kwanyako		
4	Ajumako-Mando		
5	Ajumako-Amia		
6	Ajumako-Assasan		
7	Ajumako-Besease		
8	Ajumako-Baa		
9	Enyan Denkyira		
10	Enyan-Maim		
11	Ajumako-Entumbil		
12	Essiam		
13	Etsi-Sonkwa		
14	Ajumako-Kokoben		
15	Kromamu		
16	Okyeso		
17	Ajumako-Ohwan		
18	Breman Essiam		
19	Ajumako-Techiman		
20	Enyan Ankukrom		
21	Ajumako Esikado		

== See also ==
- Abowinum

== Sources ==
- "Ajumako/Enyan/Essiam District". Statoids.
- District: Ajumako/Enyan/Essiam District
