= Breman Asikuma Senior High School =

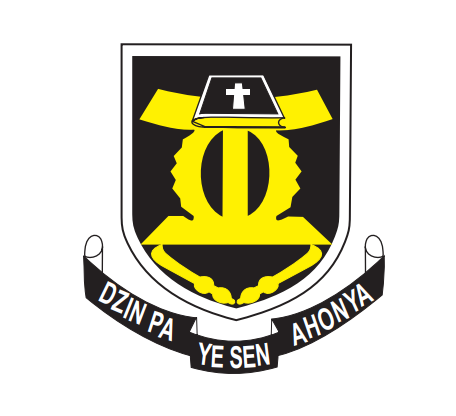
- Breman Asikuma SHS Crest

Location
- P.O Box 63; Breman Asikuma; Central Region; Ghana
- 5°35′34″N 0°59′53″W

Information
- School type: High school
- Motto: Dzin Pa Ye Sen Ahonya
- Religious affiliation: Christian
- Denomination: Methodist
- Established: October 1964
- School district: Asikuma Odoben Brakwa
- Headmistress: Sarah Baah-Odoom
- Teaching staff: 84
- Gender: Mixed
- Enrollment: 2500
- Language: English
- Area: 88 acres (36 ha)
- Houses: Amoakwa Buadu; AKYEA; ESSUMAN; OKWAN
- Colors: Yellow black
- Athletics: Track and field
- Nickname: Beautiful BASS
- Alumni: Breman Asikuma Senior High School Old Students Association
- Website: https://bassgh.webs.com/aboutus.htm
- School's anthem

Breman Asikuma Senior High School is a secondary school in Ghana and operates as a non-denominational day and boarding school, located at Breman Asikuma in the Central Region. It was the first high school in Asikuma/Odoben/Brakwa District.

The school runs courses in general science, business, general art, agricultural science, and home economics driving to the grant of a West African Senior School Certificate.

== History ==
Breman Asikuma Secondary School opened in October 1964 on the grounds of the previous Methodist Primary School, which is now Col. Baidoo Primary. J.H.S. Mr. Robert Essuman, the chief farmer at the time, was the one who came up with the idea. Messers Isaac K. Botchwey and T. B. Okwan were also involved. The Methodist Church Ghana, the Breman Asikuma Society, and the Breman Traditional Council collaborated on the project, which was directed by Very Rev. Felix Mensah Akyea, the then Superintendent Minister, and Nana Amoakwa Buadu VI, the then Omanhene.

Mr. Ernest K. A. Odoom was the first Headmaster, and the school began with six teachers: Messers E. B. Addai, Mr. Henry Aikins, Mr. Baffour, Mr. Allotey, and Mr. T. B. Okwan, as well as two non-teaching staff. At the end of the first term, there were 60 students enrolled. The school now has approximately 2500 pupils, 84permanent instructors, and 40 non-teaching personnel.

The school relocated to its current location on May 5, 1973, after Opanyin Kofi Tawiah, the then Ebusuapanyin of the Turom Nsona royal line of Asikuma, gave the state land for a permanent school site. The school has produced a number of outstanding graduates who excel in a variety of fields.

== Academics ==
=== Admission ===
Breman Asikuma Senior High School is a mixed school that admits both girls and boys. Admissions process is competitive and is only open to pupils who have finished junior high school. Final year junior high school students register for senior high school through a computerized school selection and placement system (CSSPS), which was established by the Ghana Education Service in 2005, prior to completing their Basic Education Certificate Examination (BECE).

Unlike the previous grading system, which determined a candidate's overall academic performance in the Basic Education Certificate Examination by averaging the candidate's best six subject scores, under the computerized school selection and placement system, the raw scores obtained by a candidate in the Basic Education Certificate Examination determine the candidate's overall academic performance in the exam. Because the computerized school selection and placement system uses a deferred-acceptance algorithm, which ensures that junior high school applicants are admitted solely on the basis of academic merit, the academy's administrators use raw scores from the Basic Education Certificate Examination to admit junior high school applicants.

=== Curriculum ===
The programs the school runs include general science, agricultural, business, general art, and visual arts. Final year junior high school applicants choose four elective courses as part of their computerized school selection and placement system registration. Core courses, unlike elective courses, are available to all students, regardless of their program of study. English language, core mathematics, social studies, integrated science, ICT (core), and physical education are the core courses; nevertheless, students are only assessed internally and externally in the first five aforementioned courses.

=== Academic performance ===
Breman Asikuma Senior High School maintains a high academic performance and has been recognized among Ghana's top senior high schools. It one of four schools in the Asikuma Odoben Brakwa district which had produce 60% or more of their students qualify for tertiary education. In 2015, the school made it first appearance to Ghana National Science and Maths Quiz and qualified to the one-eight stage among 135 schools.

== Student life ==
=== Facilities ===
There are about four Senior High schools in Asikuma Odoben-Brakwa. Breman Asikuma Senior High School is one of the four schools recognized by the Ghana Education Service as a category B school, depending on the number and type of amenities maintained by the school. Dining hall, a basketball court, boarding house (both male and female), a library, community clinic, science laboratory, administration block, staff bangalow, computer lab, class room blocks and a guidance and counselling facility are just a few of the facilities available.

=== Houses (halls of residence) ===
Breman Asikuma Senior High School has four houses of residence. These include;

- Amoakwa Boadu (house 1): This residence is named after Nana Amoakwa Buadu VI, the Omanhen of Breman Traditional Area and a co-founder of the institution. They have a yellow color scheme.
- Akyea (house 2): The late Rev. Felix Mensah Akyea, a co-founder of the institution and one of its founding fathers, was honored with the name of this house. Their primary color is green.
- Essuman House (house 3): This is the school's third house. They are proud of their utilization of the color red. Mr. Robert Essuman, a chief farmer in Breman Asikuma, was the one who proposed the secondary school's establishment. "Bo moi deydey!" they have as their slogan.
- Okwan House (house 4): This is the school's fourth house. Mr. T. B. Okwan, one of the school's first instructors, was honored with the name of this house. They have blue as their primary color.

=== Annual event ===
The administrators host annual events for the students and alumni, such as a speech and prize-giving day ceremony, a Founders' Day celebration, Sports competition, and a Homecoming Reunion. The school's top performers are recognized at the annual speech and prize-giving day ceremony. Retired and active instructors and employees who completed BASS are occasionally recognized for their contributions to the school.

== Old Students Association ==
The organization acts as an old students network, open to everyone who has graduated.

A president, secretary, treasurer, and public relations officer are elected for a fixed term of office at the annual general meeting. They make up the association's executive committee and are in charge of planning and carrying out all of the organization's programs and events. The association is run out of a national secretariat in Accra, which also serves as the organization's headquarters. The association donate and participate in annual events which help develop the school.

The association is made up of chapters which actually forms the main association. Some of these chapters include BASSOSA-KNUST, BASSOSA-UCC, BASSOSA-UEW and BASSOSA-UDS

== Notable alumni ==
- Bernard Tekpetey
- Samuel Marful-Sau
- Hon.Alhassan Kobina Ghansah
