= Gertrude Eyifa-Dzidzienyo =

Ghanaian archaeologist

- Born: Gertrude Aba Mansah Eyifa
- Known for: Being the first Ghanaian woman to earn a doctorate in Archaeology
- Children: 2

Academic background
- Education: University of Ghana (Doctor of Philosophy in Archaeology)
- Thesis: Archaeology and heritage management practices in Ghana: assessment of Tengzug heritage preservation and development (2017)

Academic work
- Discipline: Archaeology
- Sub-discipline: Gender archaeology
- Institutions: University of Ghana

Gertrude Eyifa-Dzidzienyo is the first Ghanaian woman to hold a PhD in archaeology. She currently lectures at department of archaeology and heritage studies at University of Ghana. Her research interest are centered on the interrelationship between archaeological findings and gender subjects, particularly women in Ghana. In 2017, she completed her PhD thesis on Archaeology and Heritage Management Practices in Ghana: Assessment of Tengzug Heritage Preservation and Development.

== Early life and education ==
Gertrude descends from the Fante people in Agona Nyarkrom, Central region. She is married with children She had her secondary education at Seventh Day Adventist Demonstration School and Juabeng Secondary Commercial School. In an interview with Mirror Ghana, she explained that her dissatisfaction with the absence of Ghanaian women in the field of archaeology was what prompted her to obtain a doctorate in the field as it will offer her an opportunity to train and motivate more females towards the discipline.

== Selected publications ==
- — (2012). "Social Construction and the Invisible Gender Roles in Talensi House Construction". Ethnographisch-Archaeologische Zeitschrift. 53 (1/2): 86–101. ISSN 0012-7477. Wikidata Q109881133.
- — (2012). "Gender Representations in Death and Burial Rituals: Perspectives from some cultural groups in Ghana". West African journal of archaeology. 40 (1/2): 35–48. ISSN 0331-3158. Wikidata Q108275409.
- —; Samuel N. Nkumbaan (2020). "Looted and illegally acquired African objects in European museums: issues of restitution and repatriation in Ghana". Contemporary Journal of African Studies. 7: 84–96. ISSN 2343-6530. Wikidata Q109853420.
