= Agona District =

- Former District
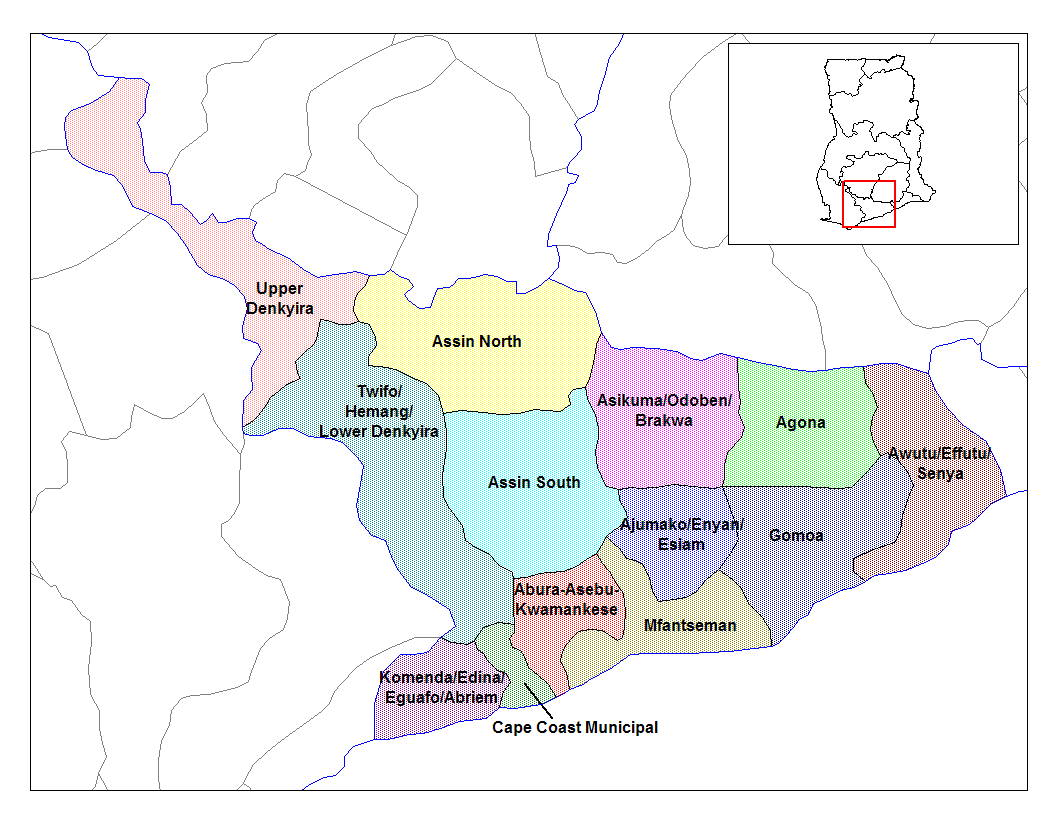
- Districts of Central Region

- Location of Agona District within Central
- Coordinates: 5°31′57.5508″N 0°42′11.898″W
- Country: Ghana
- Region: Central
- Capital: Agona Swedru

Area
  - Total: 632 km^{2} (244 sq mi)

Population
  - Ethnicity: Akan people
- Time zone: UTC+0 (GMT)
- ISO 3166 code: GH-CP-AG

Agona District is a former district that was located in Central Region, Ghana. Originally created as an ordinary district assembly in 1988. However on 29 February 2008, it was split off into two new districts: Agona West District (which was elevated to municipal district assembly status on that same year; capital: Agona Swedru) and Agona East District (capital: Nsaba). The district assembly was located in the northeast part of Central Region and had Agona Swedru as its capital town.

== Sources ==
- "Agona District". Statoids.
- District: Agona District
