= Nyakrom =

- Town
- Location of Nyakrom in Central Region
- Coordinates: 5°37′N 0°47′W
- Country: Ghana
- Region: Central Region
- District: Agona West Municipal

Population (2013)
  - Total: 22,911
- Ranked 62nd in Ghana
- Time zone: GMT
  - Summer (DST): GMT

Nyakrom is a town in the Agona West Municipal District of the Central Region of Ghana. The town is known for the Nyakrom Senior Secondary School. The school is a second cycle institution. Nyakrom is the sixty-second most populous settlement in Ghana, in terms of population, with a population of 22,911 people. HISTORY OF AGONA NYARKROM:

Nana Nyarko Eku I, king of Agona State, originated from Nsuta Kwaman in Asante State. In 1660, he lost the Paramouncy of Asante to Nana Obiri Yeboah, after the death of Nana Oti Akenteng of Asante’s fame. Nana Nyarko Eku and his supporters then moved and settled briefly at Kontanse, near Lake Bosomtwe in Asante Region.

He was suddenly attacked by Nana Yeboah and his men, who were very suspicious of Nyarko Eku's counter attack, then Nyarko Eku's men got scattered. One section of his men moved northward to present Worawora in Volta Region. The second group also moved eastwards to Kwahu Etibie in the Eastern Region. The last batch moved Southward with Nyarko Eku to present Nyakrom in Central Region. All the three sections are presently Paramount States.

Nyarko Eku and his men briefly stopped at Okumaning near Kade in Eastern Region. He also stopped at present Agona Nkum, where he was no more pursued by the Asante people.

Nana Nyarko Eku I, finally moved and settled at Agona Nyarkrom and established his kingdom. Agona State, after his hunters/warriors discovered a hidden river in the thick forest (literally "nsu na akora no ho") close to present Otsinkorang lorry station, hence the name River Akora. King Nyarko Eku I'S area of authority covered up to Kasoa and Nyanyano on the Eastern front and had common boundary with Gas (Accra) close to mile eleven (11); on the south, he conquered Senya Breku, Winneba and Apam. He had common boundary with Ajumako at Okyeso (Okye River) on the West and with Breman Asikuma and Akim State on the North. King Nyarko Eku I lost most of these towns after the Sasabor War in 1669, when he was murdered at Akwamu, then on Nsawam Hills.

== Establishment of Nyakrom ==
King Nyarko Eku I, established Nyakrom and divided it into three ethnological groups.

The first community consisted of people from Oyoko clan, who were welcomed by King Nyarko Eku I, as brothers, despite the area one come from. King Nyarko Eku I embraced individual Oyoko clan (family) to settle at Abora community (street). Subsequently, all established families at Abora were Oyoko families. The latter included; Omanhene Royal family, Odumkojoase, Bafoo Asamoa and Odofo Abiam Oyoko families.

Secondly, all families (clans) who originated from Asante, but were not from Oyoko family were congretated at Asatwia community. The latter include Odumasi, Guaben, Aboso, Nteduase and Apaa. Lastly, all other families who were originated neither from Asante, nor from Oyoko clan, were settled at Nana (namely Anana-ben) because King Nyarko Eku I, considered them, literally as strangers.

Notably, Gyata was Omanhene's Banmuhene. He was an Asante from Oyoko family.

Similarly, Nana Kwakye Dopoa was also an Oyoko and Uncle of King Nyarko Eku I, settled at Oguaa Street in Asatwia, when he arrived very late from Asante (Asankare).

== Akwanbo festival ==
Akwanbo is literally the clearing of path (i.e Akwan-bo). These routes or paths were used as severance routes to escape and to trace enemies during wartime. These severance routes in the forest were cleared each year for emergencies (i.e Akwanbo).

Akwanbo festival is celebrated in all the Agona towns between the months of August and December each year. Two types of the festival are celebrated at Nyakrom, namely Annual Akwanbo and Akwambokese.

Akwanbokese is celebrated at Nyakrom, where all the nine divisional chiefs in Agona State are carried in their palanquin to parade through pprincipal streets of Nyarkrom, amdist drumming, dancing, singing war songs and firing of musketry to durbar ground at Victory Park. The nine Agona divisions are; Swedru, Asafo, Kwanyoko, Duakwa, Nkum, Kaman, Bobikuma (Upper) and Abodom. The Annual Akwanbo Festival is also celebrated at Nyakrom, where only chiefs and Asafohemfo from Nyarkrom are carried through principal streets of Nyakrom.

== =Significance of Awkambo festival ==
==== Rememrance ====
Akwanbo is celebrated to remember the Old (elders) who fought wars to establish and maintain Nyakrom and Agona State. It is also an occasion for stocktaking, cultural and commitment to future development of Nyakrom and Agona State.

==== Census ====
In the olden days, it was used for annual stocktaking (census) to count able men who could take part in wars and returned home safely. One week after the war has seized, each man who took part in wars and returned from war cut a branch of oil palm and placed it near "Oman Posuban" (sharine). The oil palm branches were then counted to enable Nananom to ascertain number of able men who could go to war or returned from war.

==== Developments ====
It is an occasion where eminent and distinguished citizens and non-citizens of Agona, who have contributed to the development of the town or state, are rewarded in various ways.

It is on occasion where both citizens and non-citizens donate cash and materials to develop the clinic, schools, roads etc.

==== Home coming ====
It is the time most families gather and plan their way forward. Most dead men and women are remembered in various homes, while males and females spot or choose their partners.

=== Extension of invitation ===
For the first launching of Nyakrom Akwambo Festival, Okofo Katakyi Nayarko Eku X, Omanhene of Agona Nyakrom Traditional Area, chiefs, Asafo Companies and people of Agona Nyakrom issue a formal invitation to Nyakrom citizens and other people residing at home and abroad to attend this year's Akwambo festival and provide contributions in cash or in kind.

=== How they relate the festival to tourist attraction ===
Chiefs and Asafohemfo dressed in battle equipments or uniforms are carried in their palanquins and "Segu" parade through principal streets of Nyakrom to the durba ground at Victorial park, amidst drumming and singing of war songs with firing of musketry. Also Queenmothers's led by Omanhene's Queenmother, Nana Tutua VI and stool carriers parade through selected streets of Nyarkrom to durbar grounds. These parades are very attractive. Nyakrom has a Wesleyan Methodist Church. Catechist Henry Amoa Saah played an important role in its planting and growth at the foundational stages.

Nyakrom is known for having the first rural bank in Ghana,West Africa.

== Gallery ==
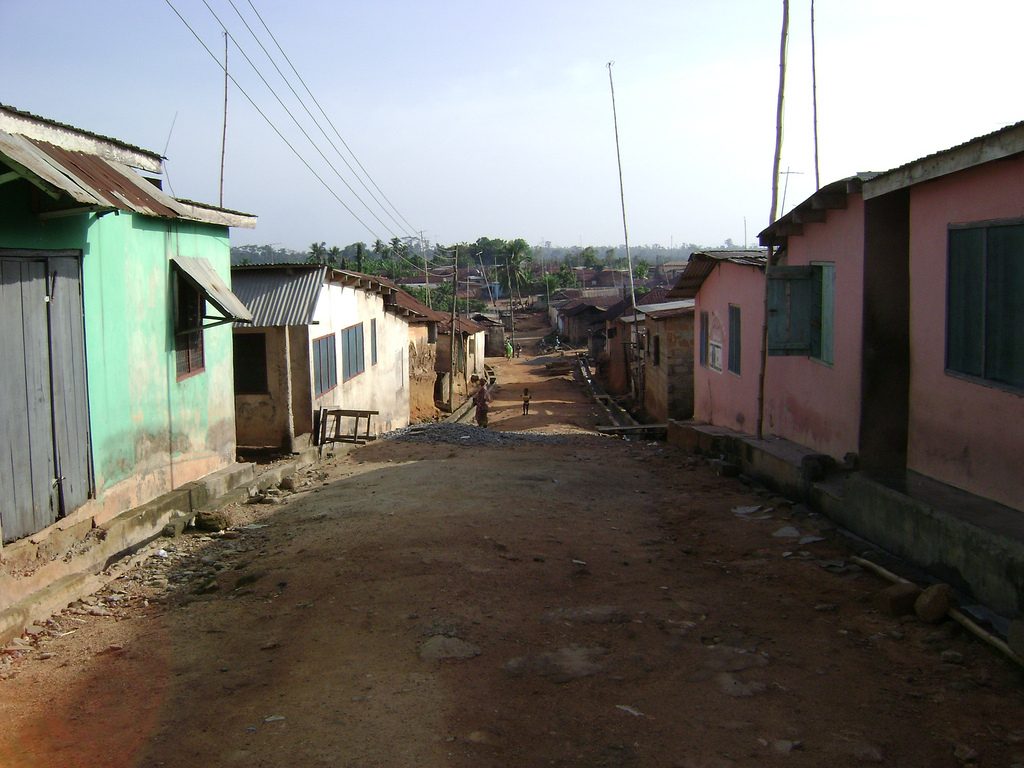
Nyakrom Street

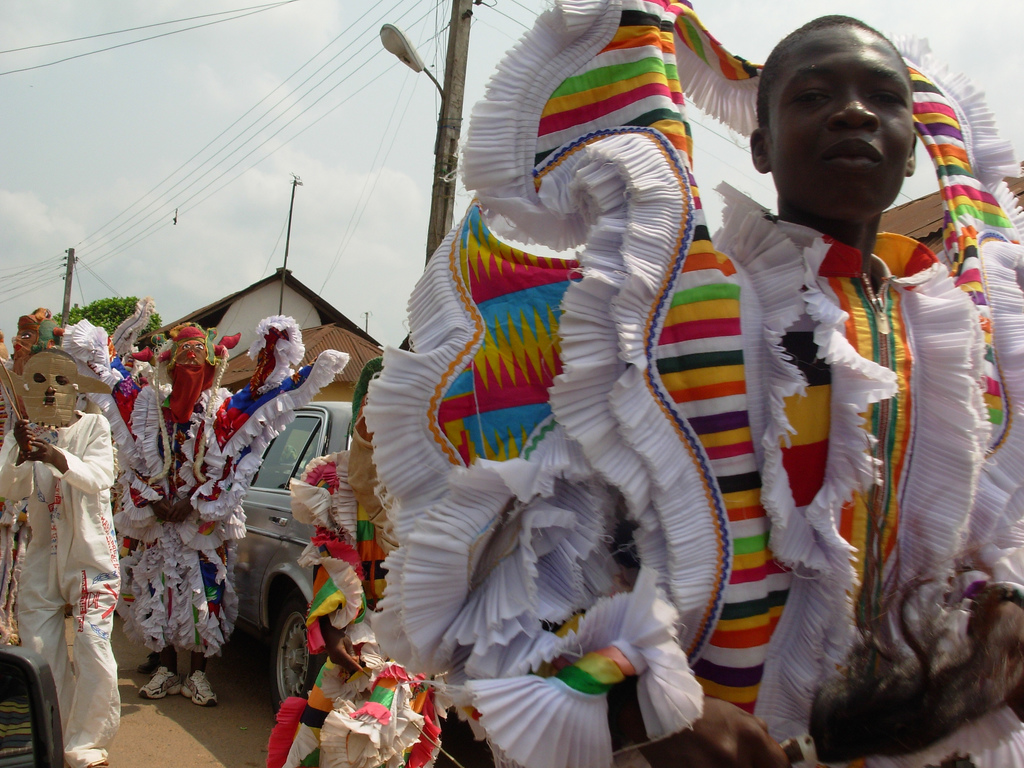
Nyakrom Fancy Dress (KAKAMOTOBI)

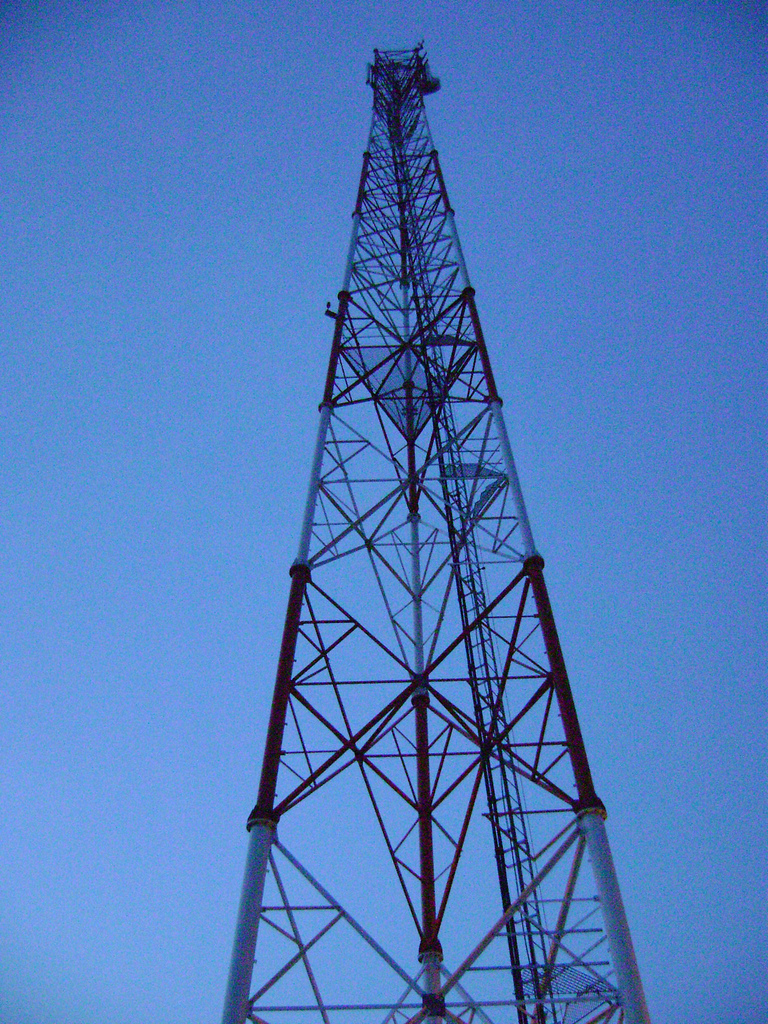
Nyakrom transformer
