= Alhassan Kobina Ghansah =

Ghanaian politician

Hon. Alhaji Alhassan Kobina Ghansah MP
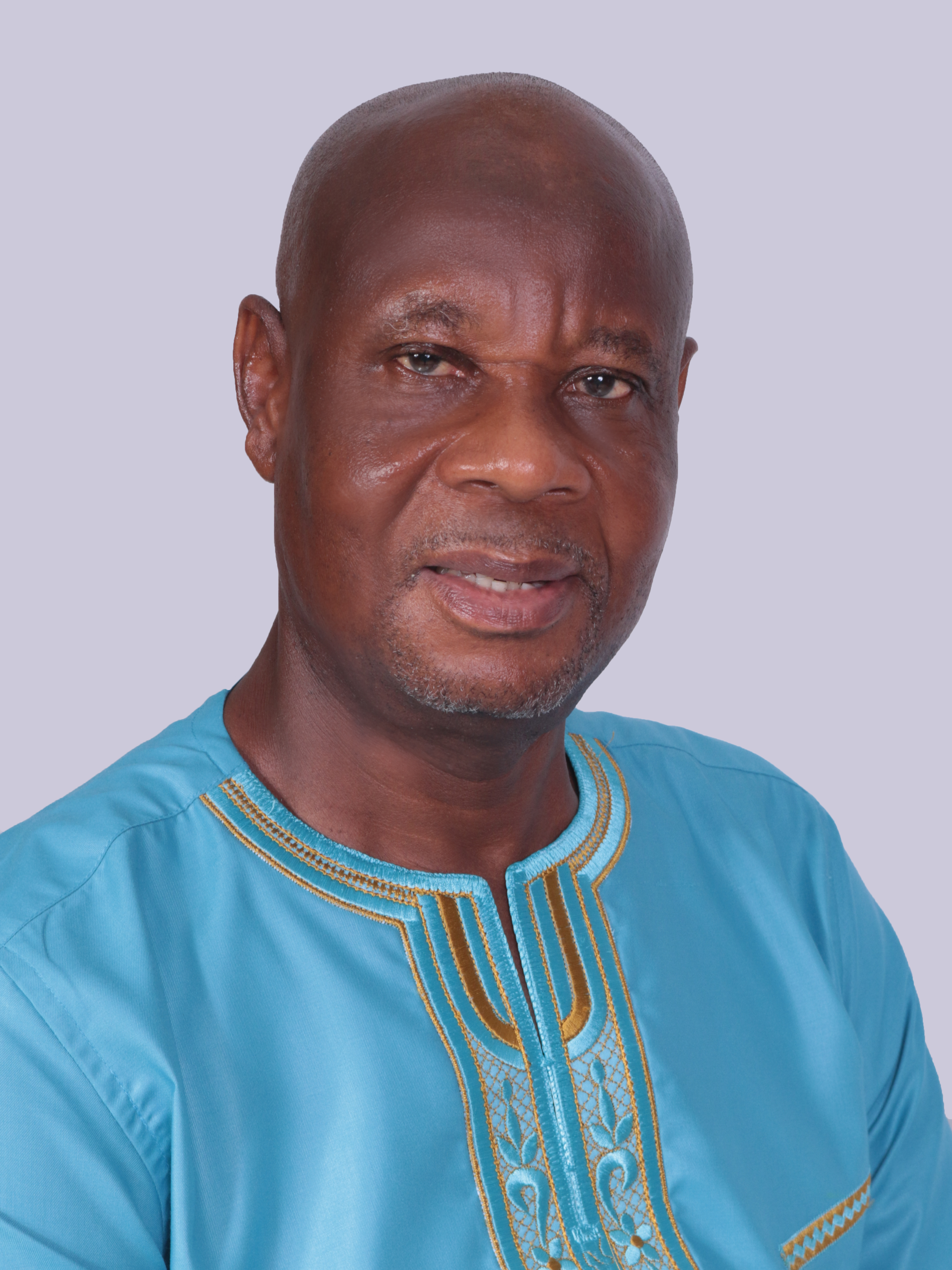

Member of Ghana Parliament for Asikuma-Odoben-Brakwa Constituency
- Incumbent
- Assumed office 7 January 2021
- Preceded by: Anthony Effah

Personal details
- Born: 29 November 1960 (age 65) Breman Bedum, Ghana
- Party: National Democratic Congress
- Occupation: Politician
- Profession: Manager
- Committees: Special Budget Committee; Environment, Science and Technology Committee

Alhaji Alhassan Kobina Ghansah is a Ghanaian politician and an old student of Breman Asikuma Senior High School who is a member of the National Democratic Congress. He is the member of Parliament for the Asikuma-Odoben-Brakwa (AOB) Constituency in the Central Region.

== Early life and education ==
Ghansah was born on 29 November 1960 and hails from Breman Bedum in the Central Region of Ghana. He had his master's degree in business administration in 2015.

== Career ==
Ghansah was the managing proprietor of Classic Rahman Enterprise.

== Politics ==
Ghansah is a member of the National Democratic Congress.

=== 2016 elections ===
In the 2016 elections Ghansah represented the National Democratic Congress in the Asikuma-Odoben-Brakwa Constituency but lost to the New Patriotic Party's candidate Anthony Effah with a difference of 430 votes. In that election he had 23,330 votes representing 49.20% and against Effah's 23,760 votes representing 50.11%.

Ghansah entered the race for the parliamentary candidate again in the NDC primaries in the Asikuma-Odoben-Brakwa Constituency ahead of the 2020 elections. Ghansah won the parliamentary bid to represent the National Democratic Congress for the Asikuma-Odoben-Brakwa Constituency ahead of the 2020 elections in August 2019 after securing 886 votes to beat his two other opponents Michael Harry Yamson and Eric Kwesi Taylor who had 153 votes and 42 votes respectively.

=== 2020 elections ===
In December 2020, Ghansah won the seat for Asikuma-Odoben-Brakwat Constituency in the parliamentary elections after polling 28,175 votes representing 52.54% against his only opponent, Emmanuel Domson Adjei of the New Patriotic Party who had 25,454 votes representing 47.46%.

=== Committees ===
Ghansah is a member of the Special Budget Committee and also a member of the Environment, Science and Technology Committee.

== Personal life ==
Ghansah is a Muslim.
