= Abowinum =

Community in Central Regiom, Ghana

- Country: Ghana
- Region: Central Region
- District: Ajumako Enyan Essiam District

Abowinum is a community in the Ajumako Enyan Essiam District in the Central Region of Ghana.
