= Agona East District =

- District
- Districts of Central Region

- Location of Agona East District within Central
- Coordinates: 5°38′35.88″N 0°45′2.88″W
- Country: Ghana
- Region: Central
- Capital: Nsaba

Government
  - District Executive: Martin Luther Obeng

Area
  - Total: 318 km^{2} (123 sq mi)

Population (2021)
  - Total: 98,324
  - Density: 309/km^{2} (801/sq mi)
- Time zone: UTC+0 (GMT)
- ISO 3166 code: GH-CP-

Agona East District is one of the twenty-two districts in Central Region, Ghana. Originally it was formerly part of the then-larger Agona District in 1988, until the eastern part of the district was split off to create Agona East District on 29 February 2008; thus the remaining part has been renamed as Agona West District, which was also elevated to municipal district assembly status on that same year to become Agona West Municipal District. The Agona East district assembly is located in the northeast part of Central Region and has Agona Nsaba as its capital town. However Agona West has Agona Swedru as its capital town.

== List of settlements ==
Settlements of Upper Denkyira East Municipal Assembly
No.	Settlement	Population	Population year
1	Nsaba		

== Sources ==
- "Agona East District". Statoids.
- District: Agona East District
