= Agona Swedru =

Agona Swedru Swedru
- Town
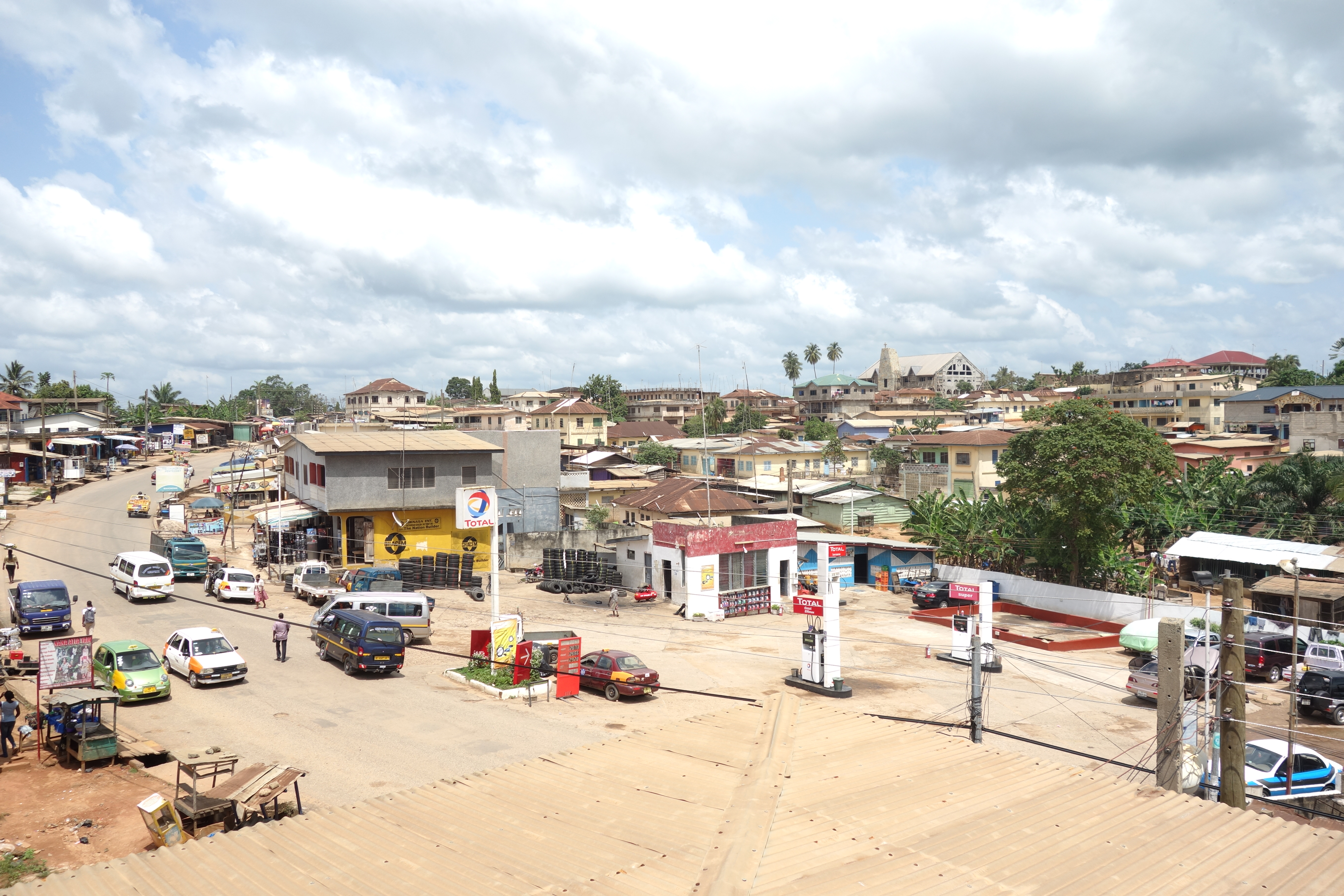

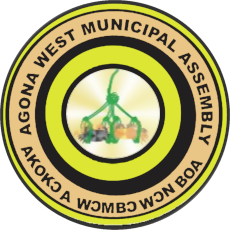
- Seal

- Location of Agona Swedru in Central region, South Ghana
- Coordinates: 5°31′50″N 0°42′10″W
- Country: Ghana
- Region: Central Region
- District: Agona West Municipal District
- Elevation: 74 m (243 ft)

Population (2013)
  - Total: 68,216
- Time zone: GMT
  - Summer (DST): GMT

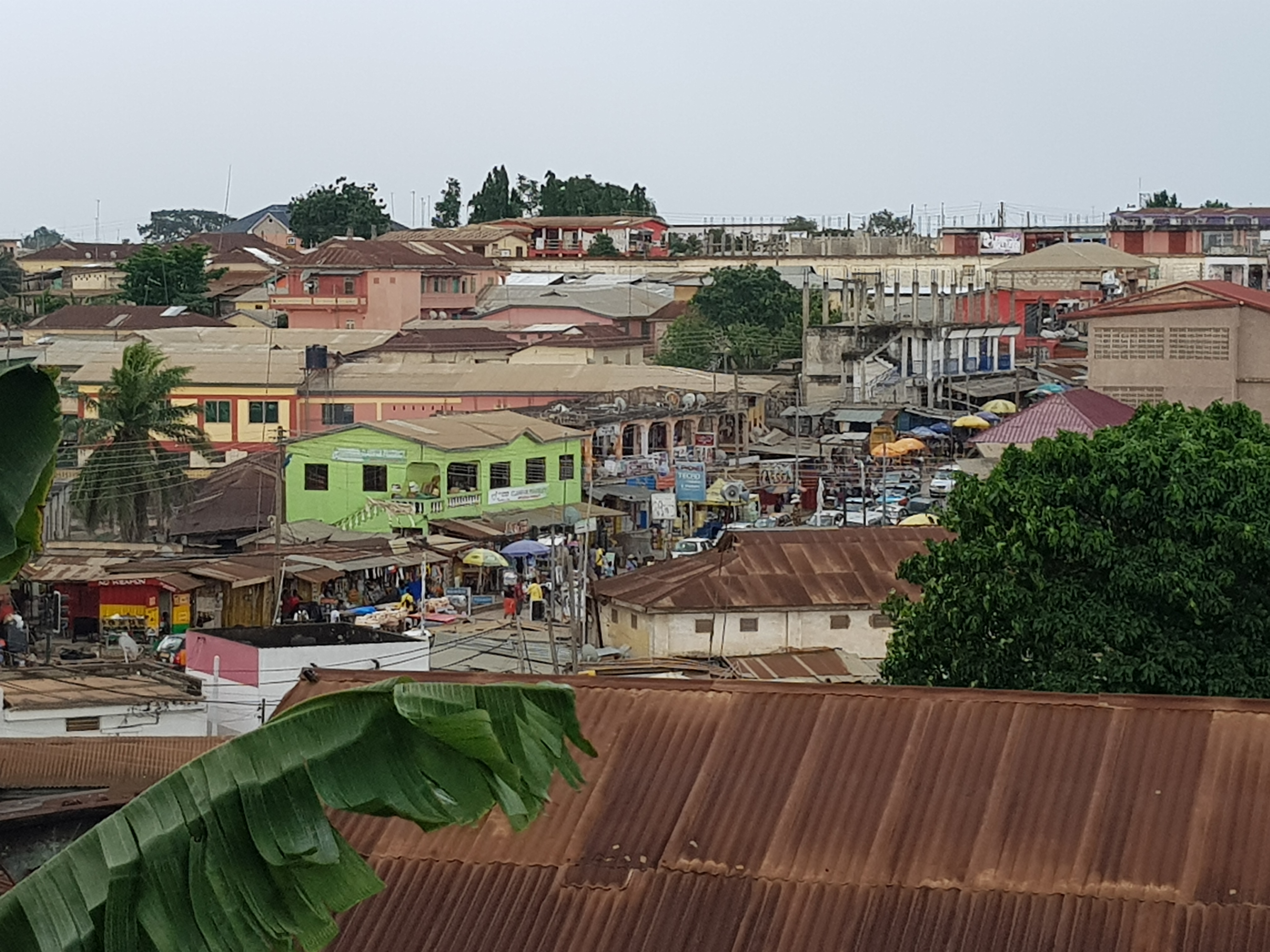
Agona Swedru

Agona Swedru is a town and the capital of Agona West Municipal District, a district in the Central Region of south Ghana. Agona Swedru has a 2010 settlement population of about 55,239 people. Akwambo is the main festival celebrated by the people of Agona Swedru and it is celebrated in the month of August. Fante is the primary language spoken by the people of Agona Swedru.

Agona Swedru is popularly known for the planting and trading of plantain. The name "Swedru" was originated from the planting of plantain within the town.

== Education ==
There are two public senior high schools located in the Agona Swedru, namely; Swedru Senior High and Swedru School of Business.

== Economy ==
1. Farming
2. Trading

== See also ==
- Agona West Municipal District
- Central Region

== Gallery ==
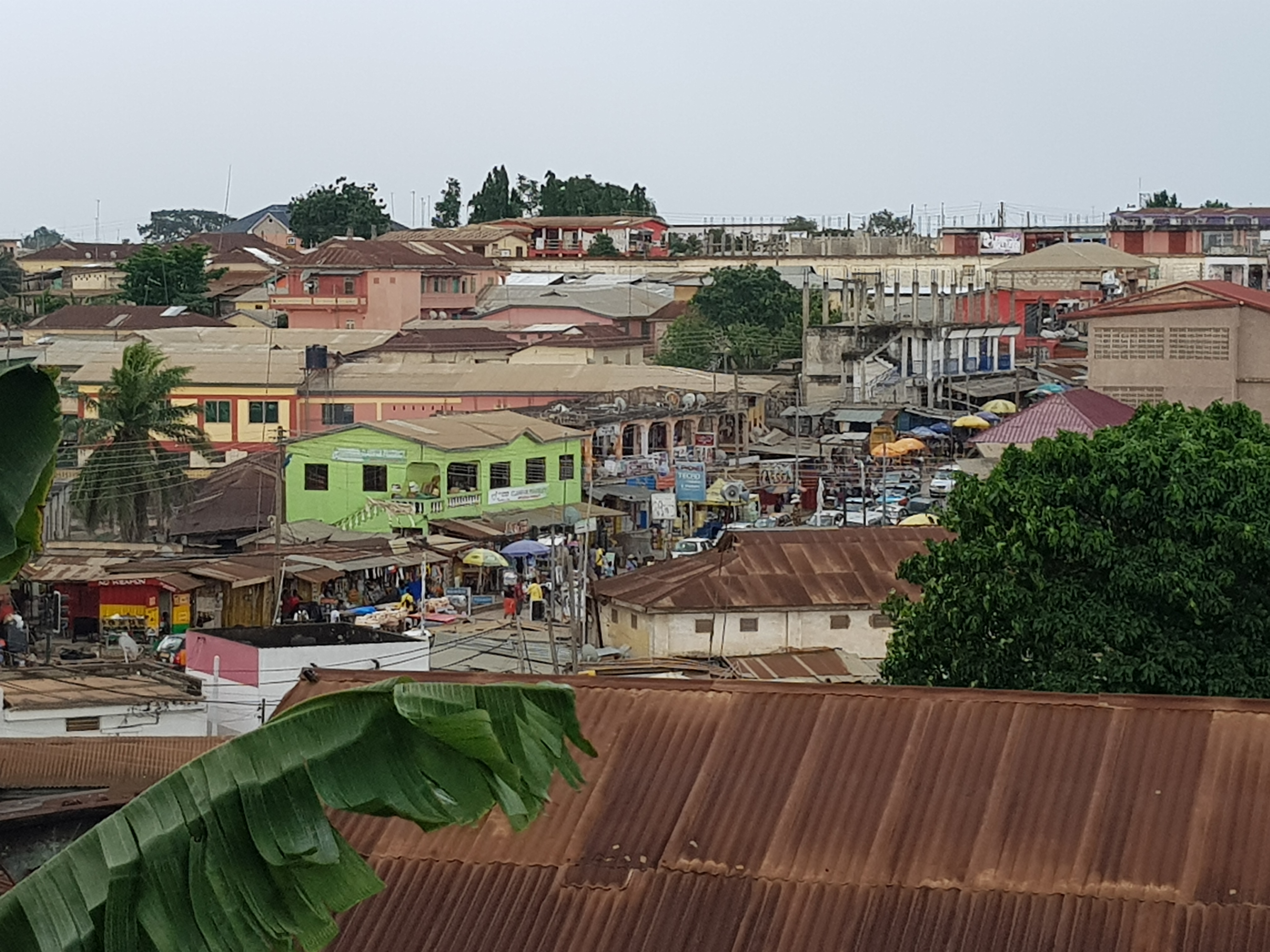
Sky view of some part of Swedru

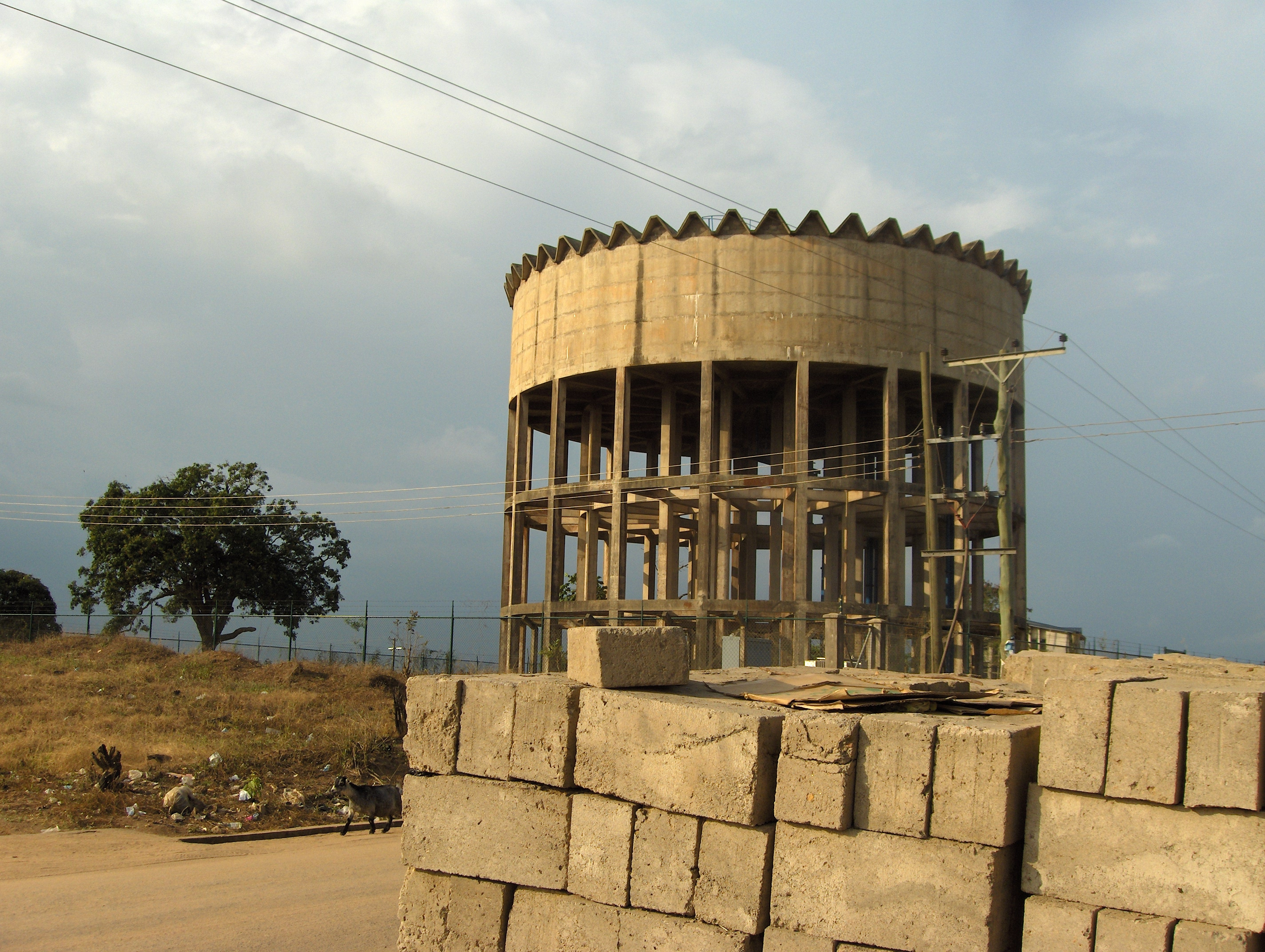
Swedru Pipe tank

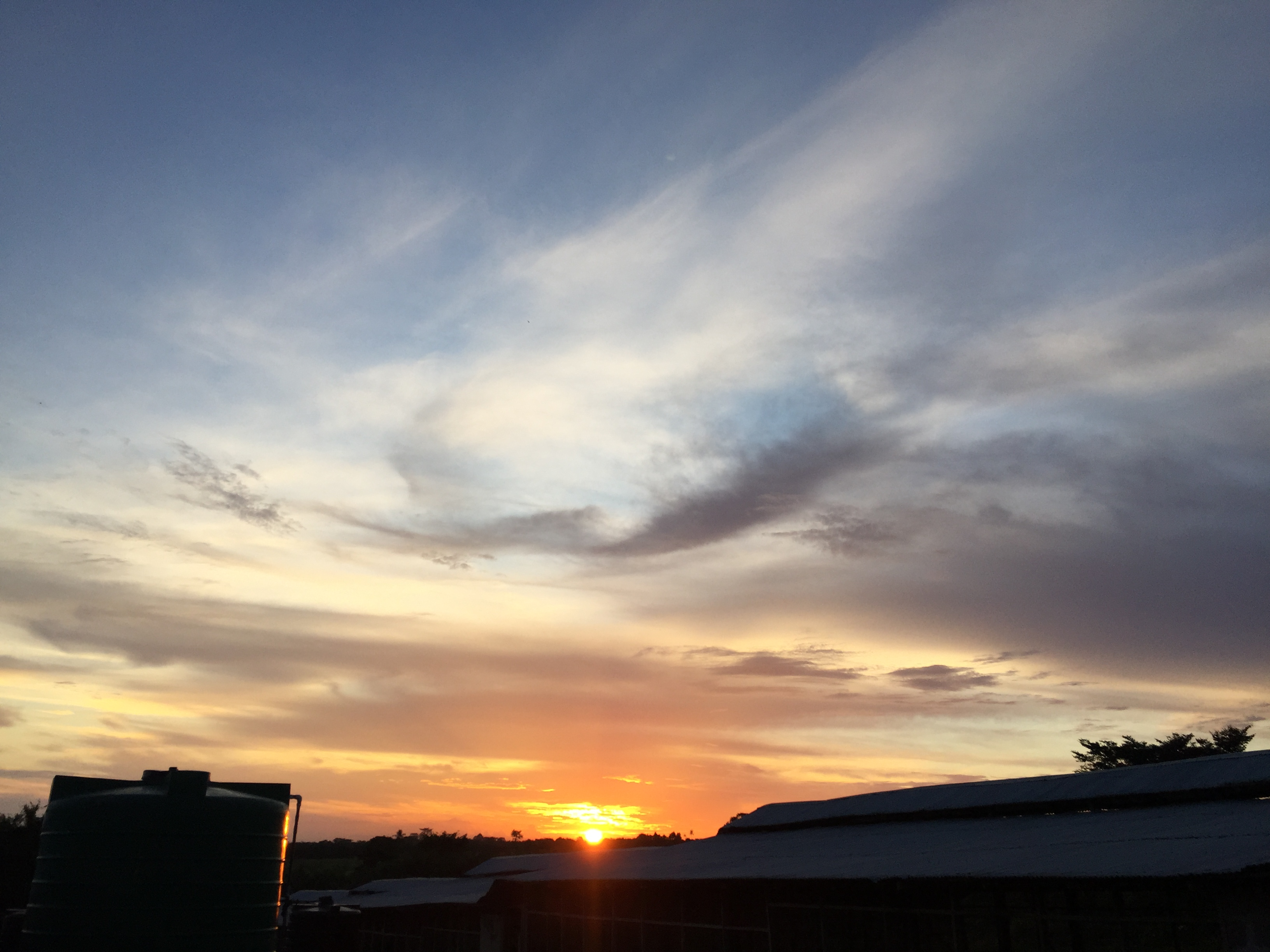
