= Ajumako =

- Location in Ghana
- Coordinates: 5°21′N 0°46′W
- Country: Ghana
- Region: Central Region
- District: Ajumako-Enyan-Esiam

Ajumako is a town in Ghana. It is the capital of Ajumako-Enyan-Esiam district. It is famous for being the birthplace of Ottobah Cugoano, an abolitionist of the 18th century.

== Facts of Interest ==
The University of Education, Winneba (Ajumako Campus) is situated there.

The natives are Fante except the people of Breman Essiam who trace their lineage to Breman, near Kumasi. The main occupation of the people is farming with emerging markets at Breman Essiam and Ajumako. The current Member of parliament of the district is Dr. Cassiel Ato Forson who hails from Ajumako Bisease.

Amongst the most popular towns with the Ajumako Enyan Essiam area are Ajumako Bisease, Ajumako Kokoben, Ajumako Owane, Ajumako Kumasi, Enyan Denkyira (The Enyan People). There are also a group of people known as the Etsifui (bushy hair) with their towns such as Etsii Sunkwaa etc. They are the Guan groups.

== Institutions ==
University of Education, Winneba (Ajumako Campus)
