= Asikuma/Odoben/Brakwa District =

Asikuma-Odoben-Brakwa District
- District
- Seal
- Nickname: AOB
- Districts of Central Region

- Location of Asikuma-Odoben-Brakwa District within Central
- Coordinates: 5°34′51.96″N 0°59′39.84″W
- Country: Ghana
- Region: Central
- Capital: Breman Asikuma

Government
  - Member of Parliament: Hon. Alhassan Kobina Ghansah

Area
  - Total: 765 km^{2} (295 sq mi)

Population (2021)
  - Total: 126,993
- Time zone: UTC+0 (GMT)
- ISO 3166 code: GH-CP-AO
- Website: Official Website

Asikuma-Odoben-Brakwa District is one of the twenty-two districts in Central Region, Ghana. Originally created as an ordinary district assembly in 1988, which was created from the Breman-Ajumako-Enyan District Council from 1974 to 1978. The district assembly was located in the northeast part of Central Region and had Breman Asikuma as its capital town.

== List of settlements ==
Settlements of Asikuma-Odoben-Brakwa District
No.	Settlement
1	Amanfopong
2	Breman Amoanda
3	Breman Anhwaim
4	Breman Asikuma
5	Breman Ayipey
6	Breman Benin
7	Breman Baako
8	Breman Brakwa
9	Breman Bedum
10	Breman Fosuansa
11	Breman Jamra
12	Breman Kokoso
13	Breman Kuntenase
14	Breman Nwomaso
15	Breman Nyamebekyere
16	Breman Odoben
17	Breman Okyesoa
18	Nankese
19	Sowotuom
20	Supunso
21	Towoboase

== Sources ==
- "Asikuma/Odoben/Brakwa District". Statoids.
- District: Asikuma/Odoben/Brakwa District
