= University of Education, Winneba =

Public university in Winneba, Ghana

- Arms of the University of Education, Winneba
- Motto: Education for Service
- Type: Public
- Established: 1992; 34 years ago
- Chairman: Prof. Obeng Mireku
- Vice-Chancellor: Prof. Stephen Jobson Mitchual
- Students: Over 60,000
- Location: Winneba, Central Region, Ghana
- Campus: Urban area / Suburban area (Winneba, Ajumako)
Colours
Scarlet, White and Ultramarine
- Website: www.uew.edu.gh

The University of Education, Winneba (UEW) is a university in Winneba, Central Region of Ghana. The University of Winneba was established in 1992 under a government ordinance (PNDC Law 322). and with a relationship with the University of Cape Coast. Its main aim is to train teachers for the education system of Ghana. The University of Education, Winneba is charged with the responsibility of teacher education and producing professional educators to spearhead a new national vision of education aimed at redirecting Ghana's efforts along the path of rapid economic and social development. The University of Education, Winneba is expected to play a leading role in Ghana's drive to produce scholars whose knowledge would be fully responsive to the realities and exigencies of contemporary Ghana.

== Organisation ==
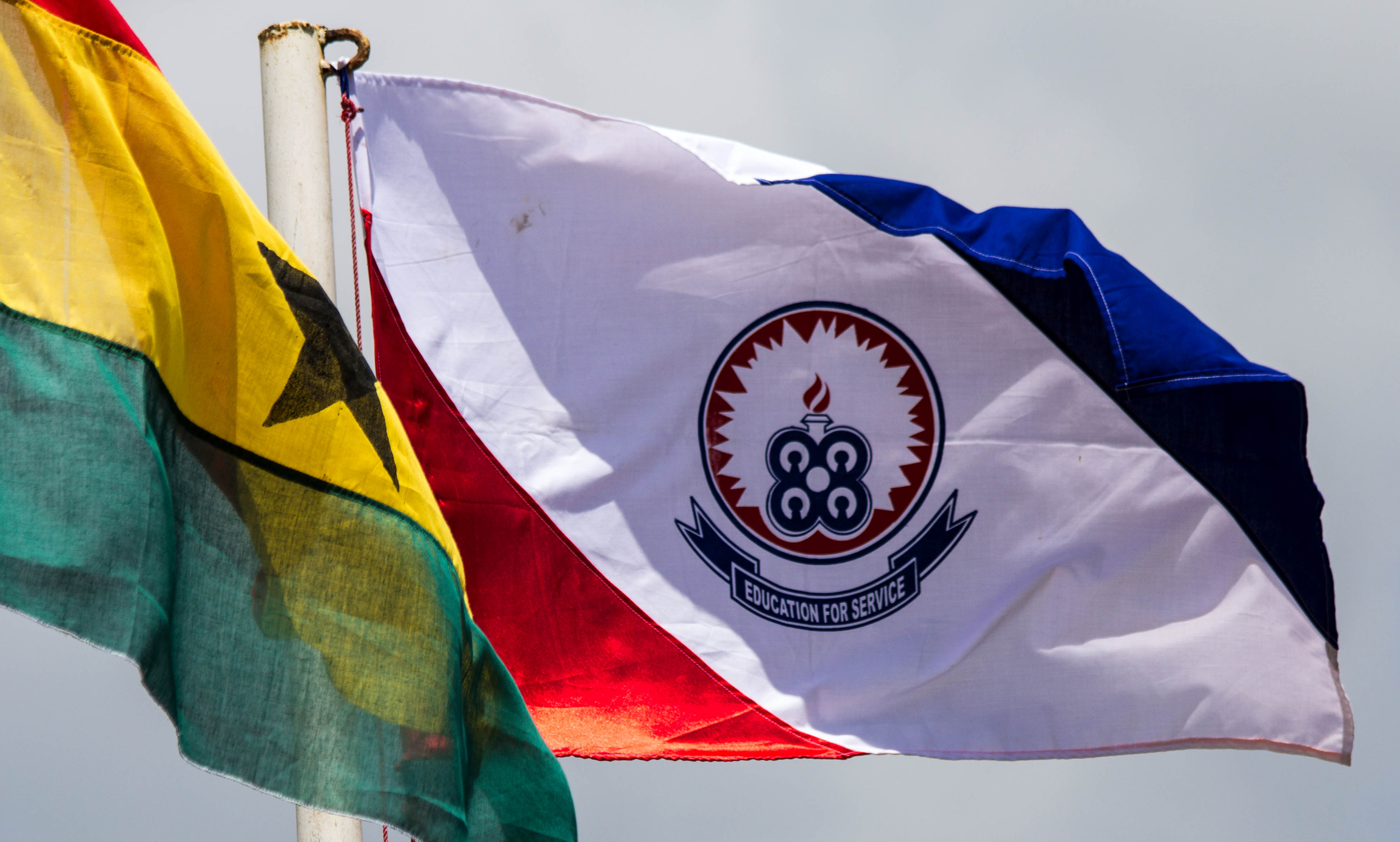
Flying Flag of the University of Education, Winneba (UEW) and the Flag of Ghana

The university has twenty-nine academic departments and centers, seven faculties. It also has 18 distance education regional study centers throughout Ghana.

In addition to three campuses in Winneba where its administrative office is located, the university has one extra campus in addition to over 20 study centers:

- The College of Languages Education – Ajumako Campus

== College of Languages Education ==
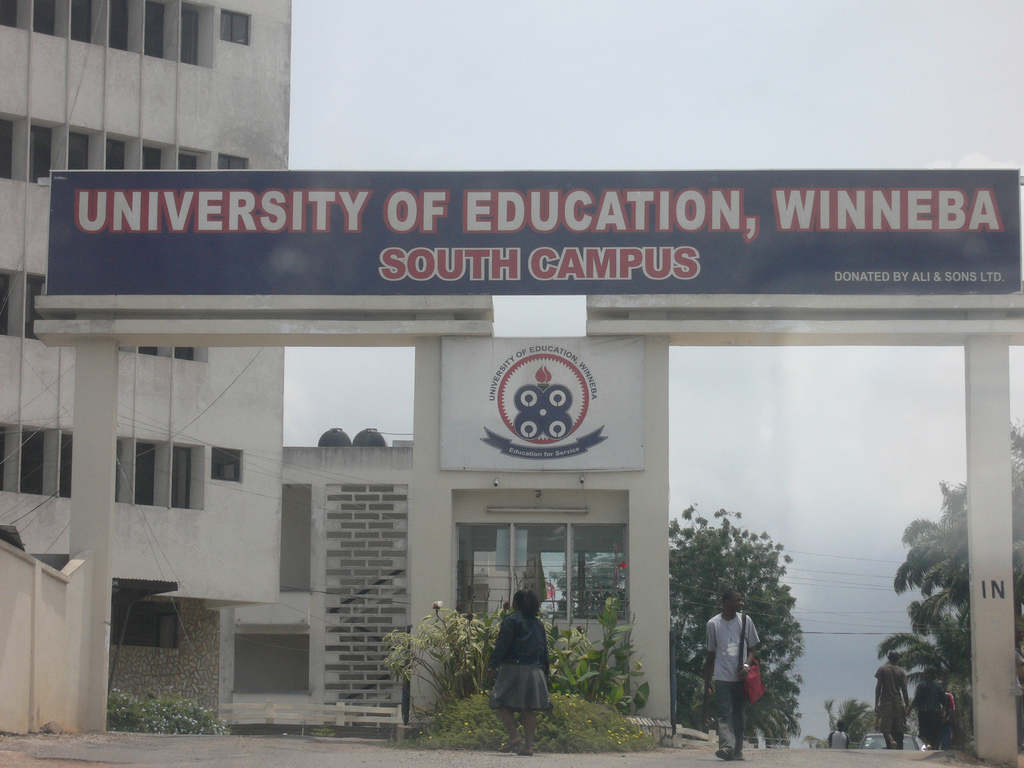
University of Education, Winneba (UEW) Entrance

The Ajumako Campus currently hosts the students of the Department of Akan-Nzema Education, Ewe Education, Ga–Dangme Education of The Faculty of Ghanaian Languages Education.

Gradually the Faculty of Languages Education will move from the Winneba Campus to the Ajumako Campus and will eventually become the College of Languages Education.

=== Faculty of Languages Education ===
- Department of Akan-Nzema Education
- Department of Applied Linguistics
- Department of English Education
- Department of French Education
- Department of Gur - Gonja Education
- Department of Ewe Education

== The Winneba Campus – Main Campus ==
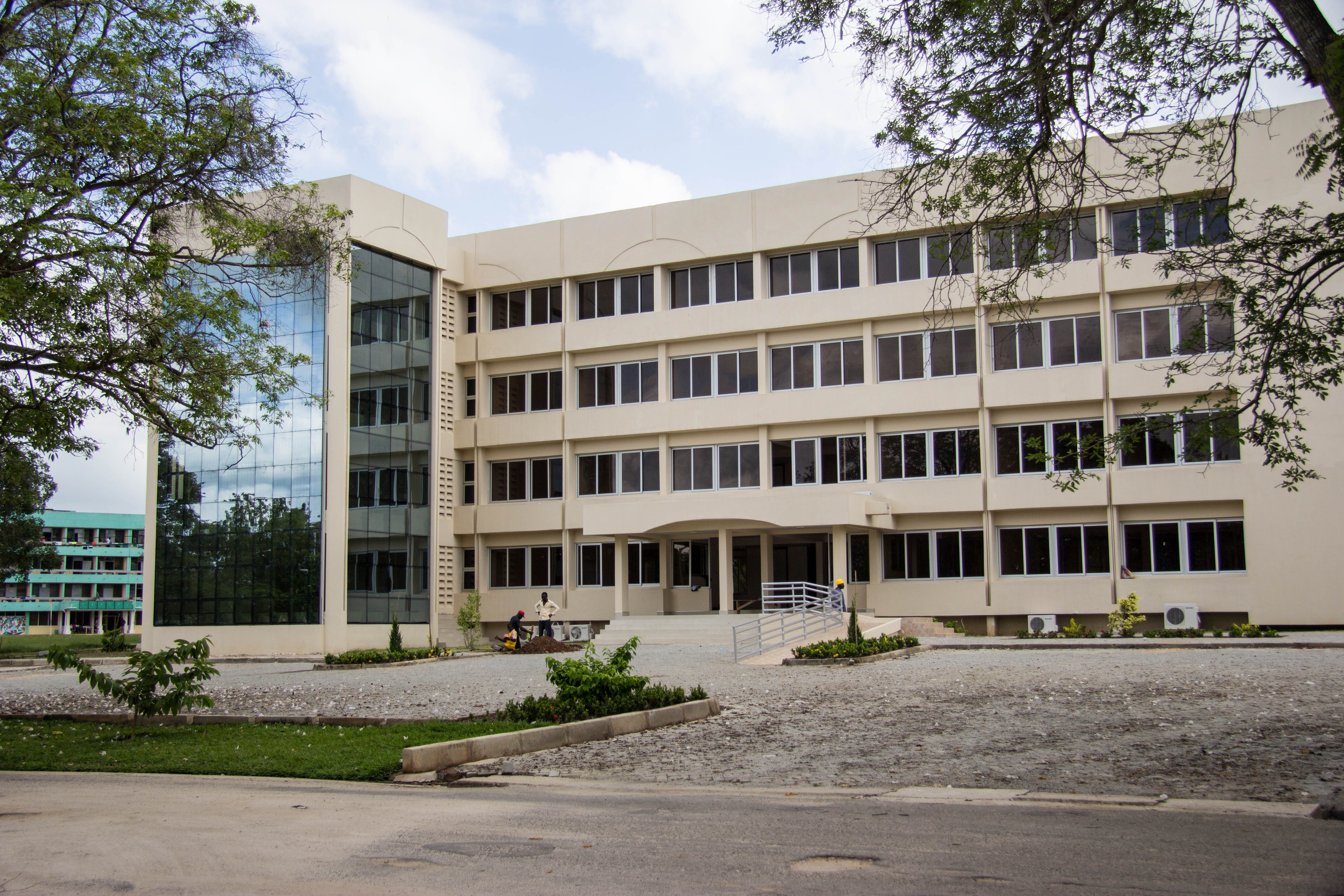
University of Education, Winneba (UEW) North Campus

The Winneba Campus is the main campus of the university and is spread over three sites (North, Central and South) within the Effutu Municipality. The central administration of the university is located at the North Campus. The Winneba Campus hosts the following faculties, schools, institute, centers and offices:

=== Faculty of Social Sciences Education ===
- Department of Health, Physical Education, Recreation and Sports Education
- Department of Home Economics
- Departments of Mathematics Education
- Department of Biology Education
- Department of Social Science Education
- Department of Social Studies Education
- Department of Business Administration
- Department of Health Administration and Education

== Institutes and schools ==
=== School of Creative Arts ===
- Department of Art Education
- Department of Graphic Design
- Department of Music School
- Department of Theatre Arts

=== Institute for Educational Development and Extension ===
- Center for Continuing Education
- Center for Distance Education
- Center for Teacher Development and Action Research

=== Institutes for Educational Research and Innovation Studies (IERIS) ===
- National Center for Research into Basic Education (NCRIBE)
- Center for Educational Policy Studies (CEPS)
- Center for School and Community Science and Technology Studies (SACOST)

== Campuses ==
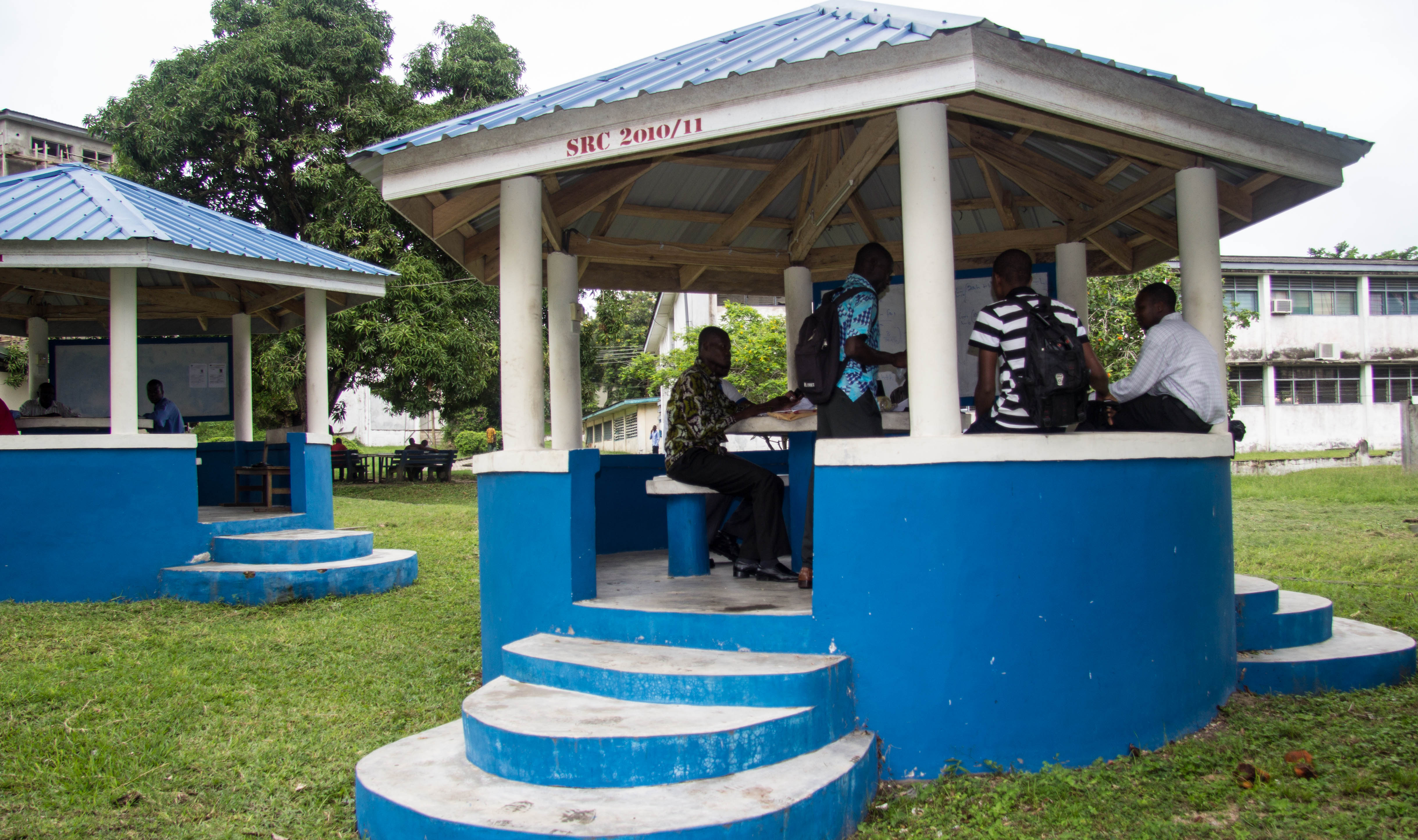
Students at the Kiosks of the University of Education, Winneba (UEW)

It is a multi-campus, multi-site university. It has four campuses now, three at Winneba and one at Ajumako in the Central Region of Ghana.

As a multi-campus, multi-site university with campuses and learning centres in other parts of the country, UEW has six Faculties, one institute and two centres of the university provide programmes in the areas of Science and Mathematics Education, Technology and Business Education, Agriculture Education, Home Economics Education, Cultural Studies, Creative Arts Education, Guidance and Counselling and Educational Administration and Leadership.

Gallery

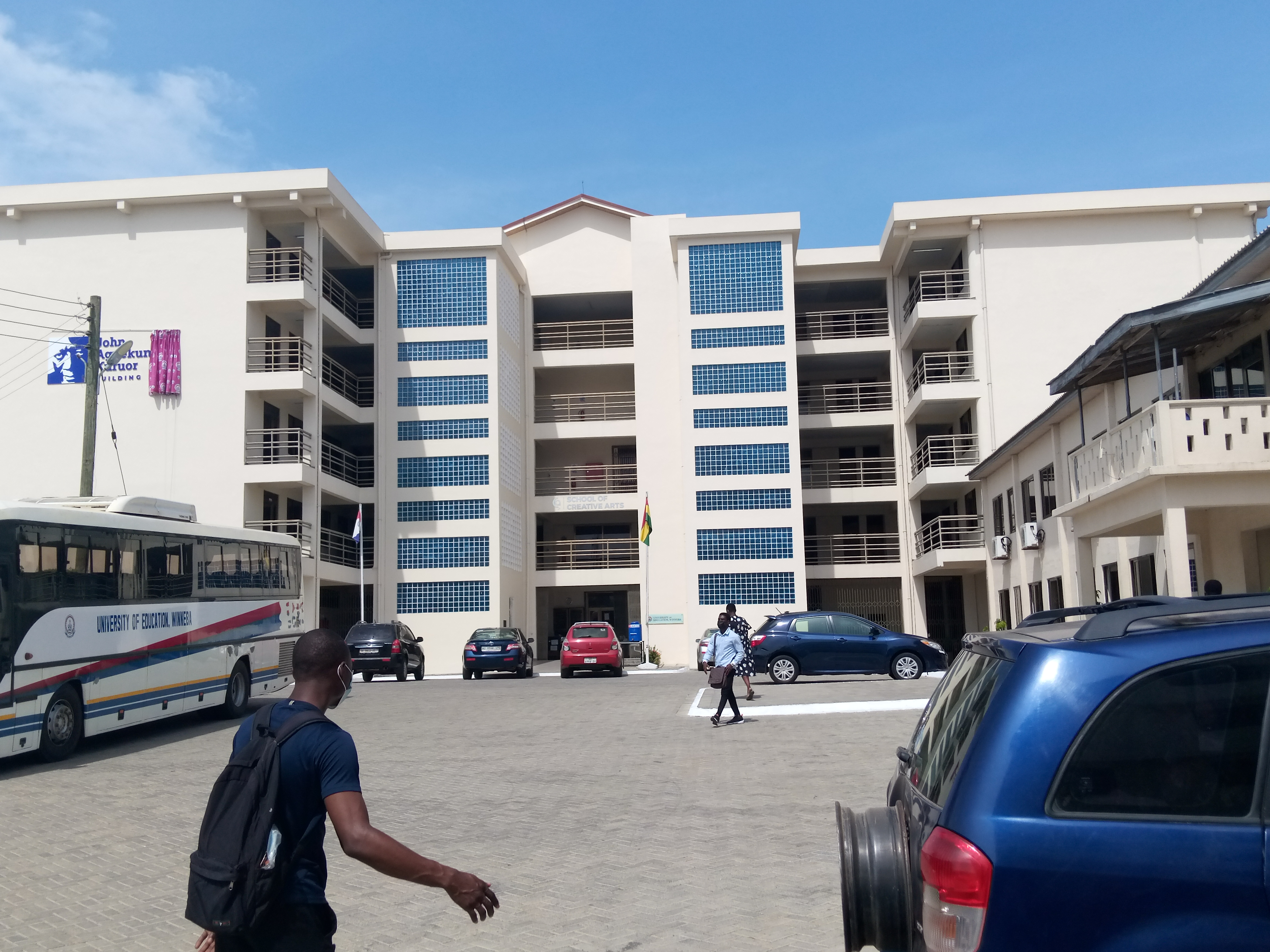
Central Campus

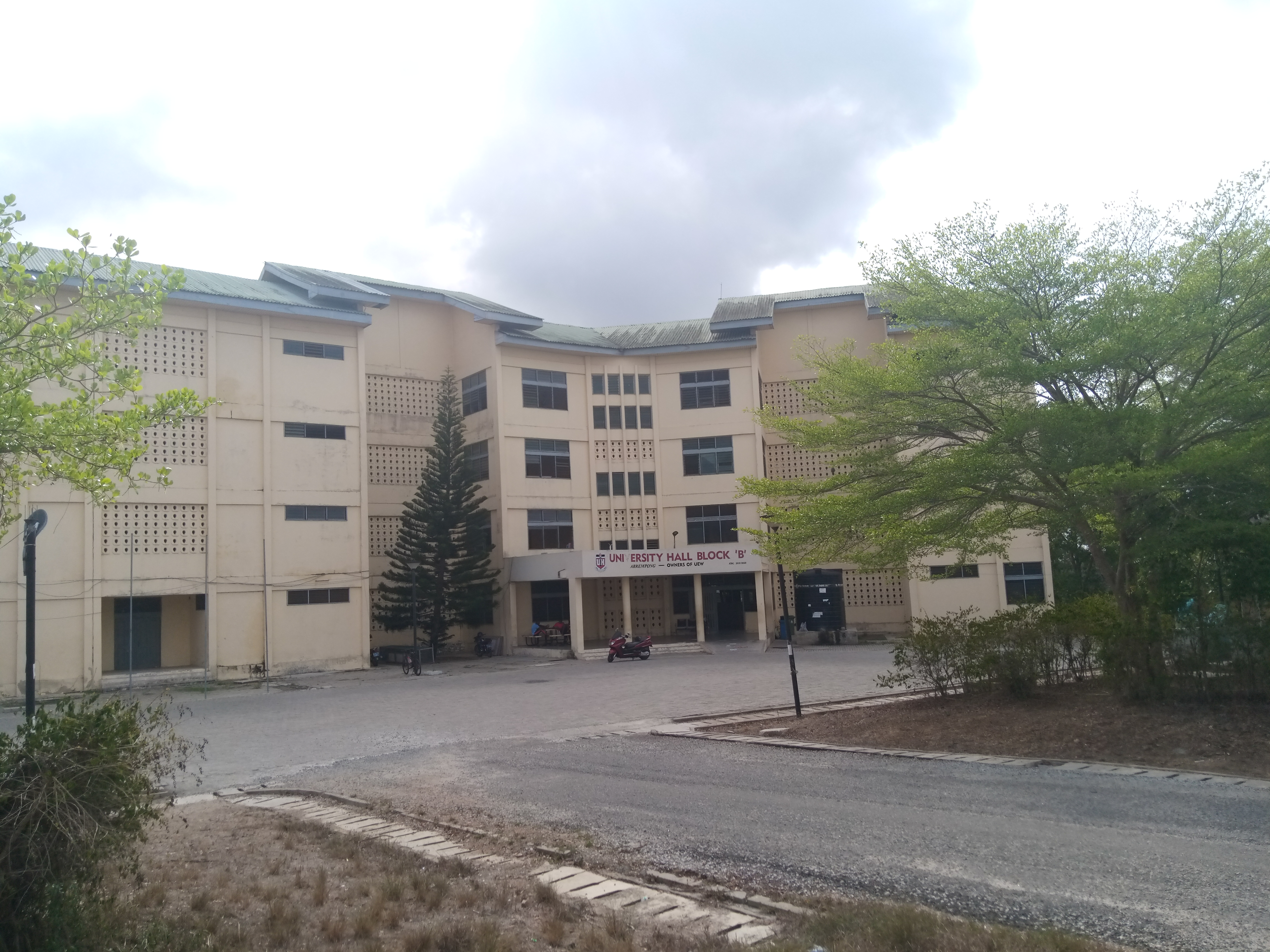
University Hall

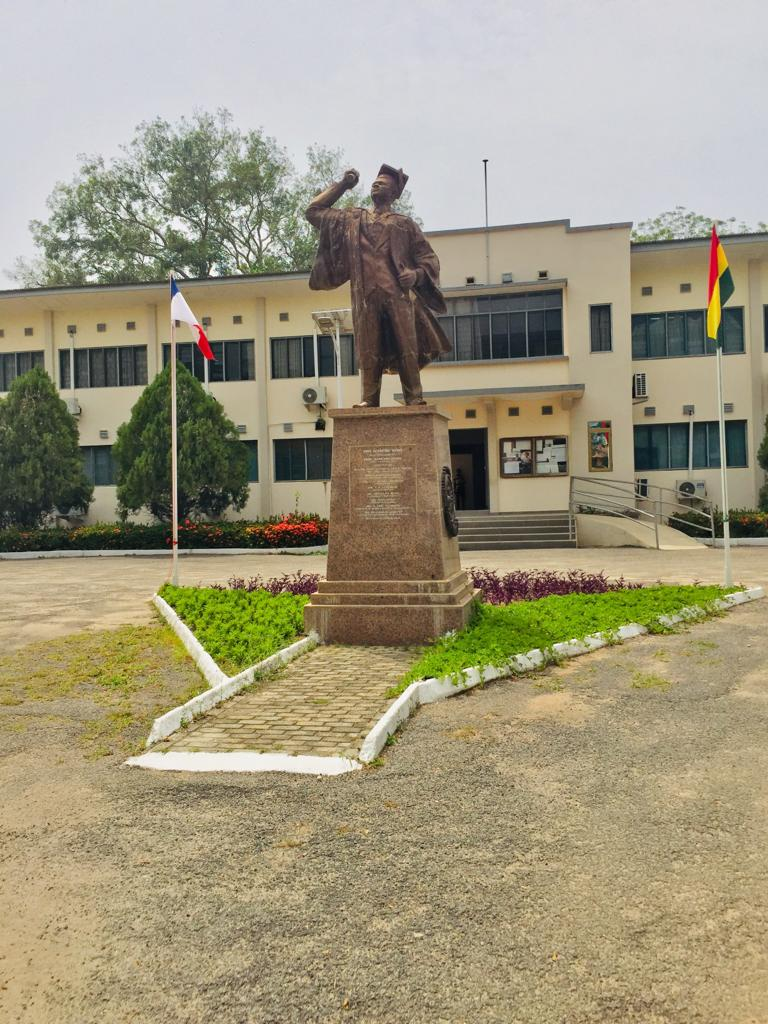
An image of the monument in front of University Of Education, Winneba Ajumako Campus.

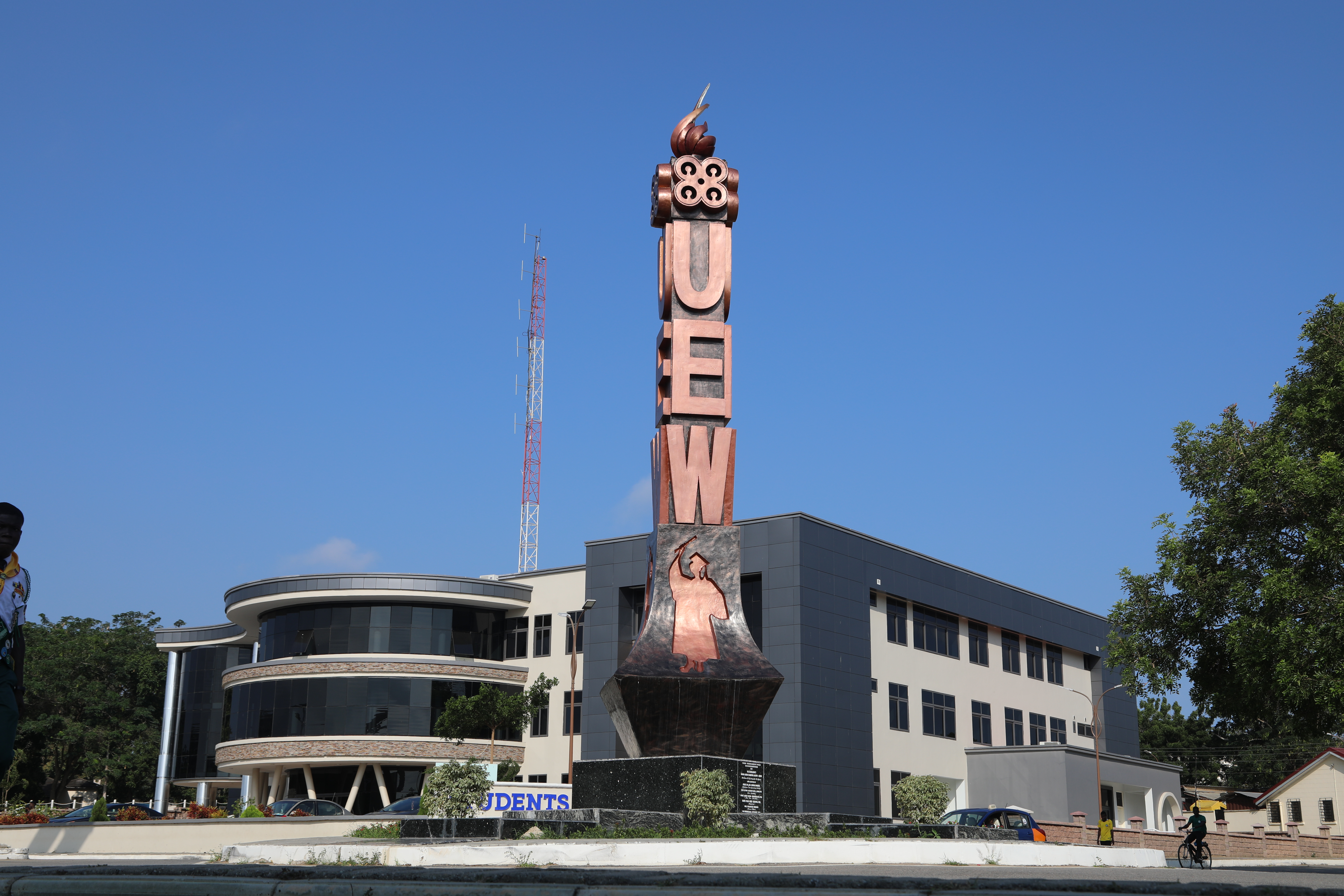
The student centre of the University of Education Winneba, North Campus

== Memorandum of Understanding ==
In May 2021, the institution signed an MoU with an NGO called Transforming Teaching, Education and Learning to improve education. The MoU was signed at the Council Chamber of the North Campus of the institution. The project was funded by the MasterCard Foundation.

== See also ==
- List of universities in Ghana
