= Kwanyako =

- Town
- Location within Ghana
- Coordinates: 5°35′54″N 0°38′1″W
- Country: Ghana
- Region: Central Region
- District: Agona East Municipal District
- Time zone: GMT
  - Summer (DST): GMT

Kwanyako is a town in the Central Region. The town is known for the Kwanyako Secondary School. The school is a second cycle institution.
