= Akwambo festival =

Festival in the Central Region of Ghana

The Akwambo festival is celebrated by the chiefs and peoples of Gomoa and Agona in the Central region of Ghana. The festival is celebrated in the month of August every year.People in Agona, in the Central Region, celebrate the Akwambo, which literally means "path-clearing."

== History ==
In order to remember the trip and arrival of the original inhabitants of the four towns of Gyinankoma, Ekrawfo, Atakwaa, and Otabenadze, the Akwambo festival is often a week-long event. A day was set aside for this purpose, and everyone who used these paths was to gather and begin the exercise. Akwambo was first observed by the migrant ancestors of these people, whose primary role when they arrived in a new place was clearing paths to the rivers, farms, and other communal places. Today, the special festivals include events like Durbar, music and dance performances, football matches, family or community reunions, and parades.

Parades through the streets add to the festive atmosphere, as participants revel in the shared bonds of kinship and heritage. As the echoes of drumbeats and jubilant laughter fill the air, the Akwambo festival serves as a vibrant celebration of unity.
