= Georgina Nkrumah Aboah =

Ghanaian politician

Georgina Nkrumah Aboah (born 2 June 1959) is a member of the Parliament of Ghana, representing for Asikuma-Odoben-Brakwa in the Central region.

== Personal life ==
Georgina is married with two children. She is a Christian (Methodist).

== Early life and education ==
She was born on 2 June 1959 in Breman-Brakwa in the Central region. She earned her diploma at the University of Ghana in 1990–92. She attended University of Education, Winneba in 2000-2008 where she had B' Education in Educational Administration. She further obtained M' Edu in Guidance and Counselling in 2008–2010.

== Politics ==
She is a member of the National Democratic Congress.

She was a member of parliament for Asikuma-Odoben Brakwa Constituency in the Central Region.

== Employment ==
She is an educationist. She was Coordinator in charge of SHS at the Tema Metropolitan Office of the GES. She was the DCE for Asikuma-Odoben-Brakwa District from 30 April 2009-January, 2013.
