= Agona West Municipal District =

- Municipal District
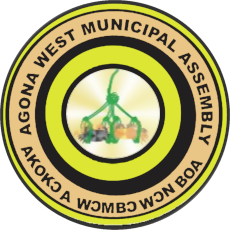
- Seal

- Districts of Central Region

- Location of Agona West Municipal District within Central
- Coordinates: 5°31′57.5508″N 0°42′11.898″W
- Country: Ghana
- Region: Central
- Capital: Agona Swedru

Government
  - Municipal Chief Executive: Hon. Mrs Justina Marigold Assan

Area
  - Total: 632 km^{2} (244 sq mi)

Population (2021)
  - Total: 136,882
  - Density: 217/km^{2} (561/sq mi)
- Time zone: UTC+0 (GMT)
- ISO 3166 code: GH-CP-
- Website: Official Website

Agona West Municipal District is one of the twenty-two districts in Central Region, Ghana. Originally, it was part of the then-larger Agona District in 1988, until the eastern part of the district was split off to create Agona East District on 29 February 2008; thus the remaining part has been renamed as Agona West District, which was also elevated to municipal district assembly status on that same year to become Agona West Municipal District. The municipality is located in the northeast part of Central Region and has Agona Swedru as its capital town. The current MP for Agona west municipal constituency is Ernestina Ofori Dangbey,

== List of settlements ==
Settlements of Agona West Municipal Assembly
No.	Settlement	Population	Population year
1	Abodom		
2	Agona Nsaba		
3	Agona Swedru	66,471	2012
4	Amanful		
5	Asafo		
6	Bobikuma		
7	Bodwase Fantse		
8	Duakwa		
9	Mankrong		
10	Mankrong Nkwanta		
11	Kotokori		
12	Kwaman		
13	Kwansakrom		
14	Kwanyako		
15	Nkum		
16	Nkwanta Nado		
17	Nyakrom		
18	Okitsew		
19	Otenkorang		
20	Wawase		

== Sources ==
- "Agona West Municipal District". Statoids.
- Agona West Municipal – Districts
