= Nsaba =

Coordinates: 5.6433°N 0.7508°W

- Town
- Interactive map of Nsaba
- Country: Ghana
- Region: Central Region
- District: Agona East

Nsaba is a town in the Central Region of Ghana. The Nsaba Presbyterian Secondary School, a second cycle institution, is located in the town.
