= Breman Asikuma =

Coordinates: 5.5811°N 0.9944°W

- Town
- Interactive map of Breman Asikuma
- Country: Ghana
- Region: Central Region

Breman Asikuma is a town in Asikuma/Odoben/Brakwa District, Central Region, Ghana. The town is known for the Breman Asikuma Senior High School. The school is a second cycle institution.
