= Paul Asare Ansah =

Ghanaian public servant

Director-General of GPHA
- In office January 2017 – June 2018
- President: Nana Akufo-Addo
- Succeeded by: Michael Achagwe Luguje

Personal details
- Born: Ghana
- Party: New Patriotic Party
- Education: University of Ghana; Galilee College; JICA Institute; UNCTAD; KNUST
- Occupation: Communications specialist, public servant, politician
- Known for: Former Director-General of Ghana Ports and Harbours Authority (GPHA)

Paul Asare Ansah is a Ghanaian public servant and a member of the New Patriotic Party. He served as Director‑General of the Ghana Ports and Harbours Authority (GPHA) from early 2017 until his removal in June 2018 and later reassigned as advisor to the Minister of Transport

== Early life and education ==
Ansah was born in Ghana. He pursued higher education at the University of Ghana, Legon, where he earned a Bachelor of Arts, (Hons) in Humanities and a Post‑Graduate Degree in Communication Studies in 1993. He obtained a Post‑Graduate Diploma in Port Administration from Galilee College, Israel, 1997, another in Port Management (JICA Institute, Yokohama, Japan, 2003), a UNCTAD Post‑Graduate Diploma in Senior Port Management (Dublin, 2016), and a Commonwealth Executive Master’s in Business Administration (KNUST, 2015)

== Career ==
=== GPHA and maritime leadership ===
Ansah spent over two decades at the Ghana Ports and Harbours Authority in public relations and marketing roles, including Senior Public Relations Officer from 1994 to 1998, Public Affairs Manager from 1998 to 2001, Marketing & Customer Services Manager for Takoradi Port from 2001 to 2005, and Corporate Affairs and Marketing Manager in Tema from 2013 to 2015. He also served as a management consultant on PPP initiatives with Nigeria Port Authority from 2013 to 2015 and held membership in national and regional trade facilitation committees.

=== Director‑General of GPHA (2017–2018) ===
He was appointed acting Director‑General on 23 January 2017 by President Nana Akufo‑Addo, and later confirmed by GPHA board advice. During his short tenure of approximately 18 months, he pursued anti‑corruption reforms and championed indigenous participation in port development. He notably cancelled a World Bank‑backed PPP tender and awarded the concession for a Takoradi container terminal to a Ghanaian firm, IBISTEK, earning mixed reactions from donors and public institutions

==== Removal from office ====
On 6 June 2018, Ansah was officially relieved of his post and directed to hand over to the Tema Port Director, Edward Osei, until the substantive DG, Michael Achagwe Luguje, was appointed. No formal reasons were given, though media reports connected the dismissal to internal conflicts involving port unions and the GPHA board chair and political affiliations, particularly around allegations against Peter Mac Manu, former NPP chair, at a union press conference at which Ansah was present.

=== Technical advisor to the transport minister ===
Following his tenure as Director‑General of the Ghana Ports and Harbours Authority, Ansah was appointed Technical Advisor to the Minister of Transport.

=== Politics ===
Ansah is a member of the New Patriotic Party and has repeatedly contested for the parliamentary seat in the Asuogyaman constituency including running as the NPP parliamentary candidate in the 2020 general election, where he was narrowly defeated by the NDC incumbent, Thomas Nyarko Ampem., who won with 24,470 votes against 23,232 votes. Prior to that, he contested the NPP parliamentary primaries in 2007, 2011, and 2015, and later declared his intention to contest again ahead of the 2024 elections.

== Awards and recognition ==
In October 2017, Ansah was honored with a Lifetime Achievement Award from Humanity Magazine International. In December 2017, the Institute of Public Relations (IPR) Ghana named him PR Personality of the Year during its 6th PR and Communications Excellence Awards. He was also recognized by the Eastern Awards initiative in September 2018 when he received the JB Danquah Corporate Leadership Personality Award.

In April 2019, Ansah received the Community Impact Personality Award and the United Clergy International Association Award and at the 6th Ever Global Achievers Leadership Awards, he received two accolades; Community Impact Personality and Leadership Excellence
