= Takoradi Harbour =

Coordinates: 04°54′00″N 01°44′00″W

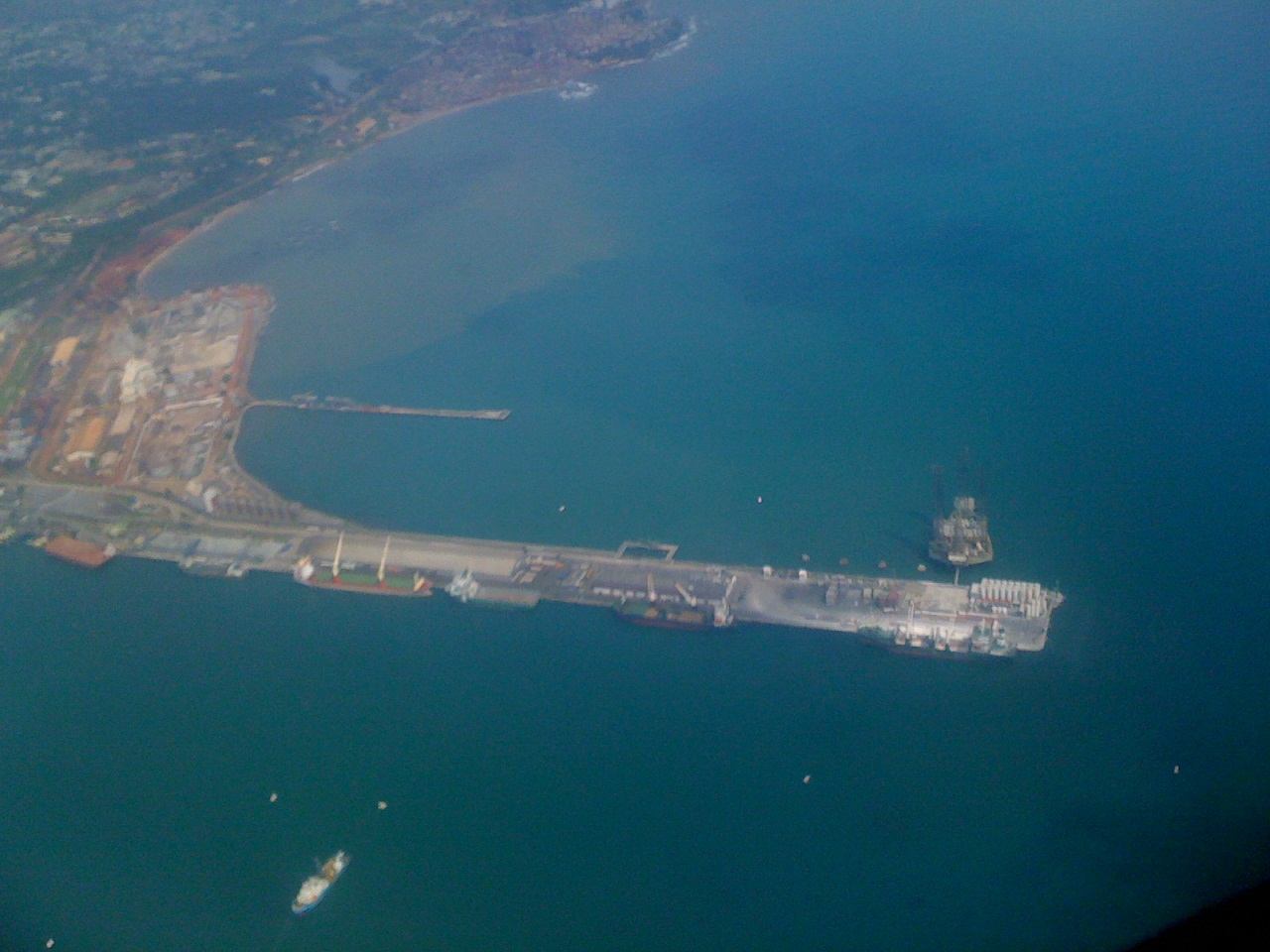
- An aerial view of Takoradi Harbour
- Interactive map of Takoradi Harbour

Location
- Country: Republic of Ghana
- Location: Takoradi, Ghana
- UN/LOCODE: GHTKD

Details
- Opened: 1928

Statistics
- Website www.ghanaports.gov.gh

The Takoradi Harbour is a harbour located in the Western region of Ghana. It is located in the industrial district of Sekondi-Takoradi and is the oldest harbour in Ghana. The Takoradi harbour, along with the Tema Harbour, are the only harbours in the country. Takoradi is a member port of the International Association of Ports and Harbours (IAPH).

== History ==
The idea for the construction of the port was first advocated in 1895 by consulting engineers of the British government. The engineers proposed that the harbour when constructed could serve both as a terminal port for the Tarkwa railway project and a naval port to serve the British empire in war times. The site for the harbour was proposed at the Amanful village which sat in the bay of the harbour today. Following surveys and planning, the construction of the port begun in 1921 by then governor of the Gold Coast, Sir Gordon Guggisberg and was completed in 1928.

== Trade ==
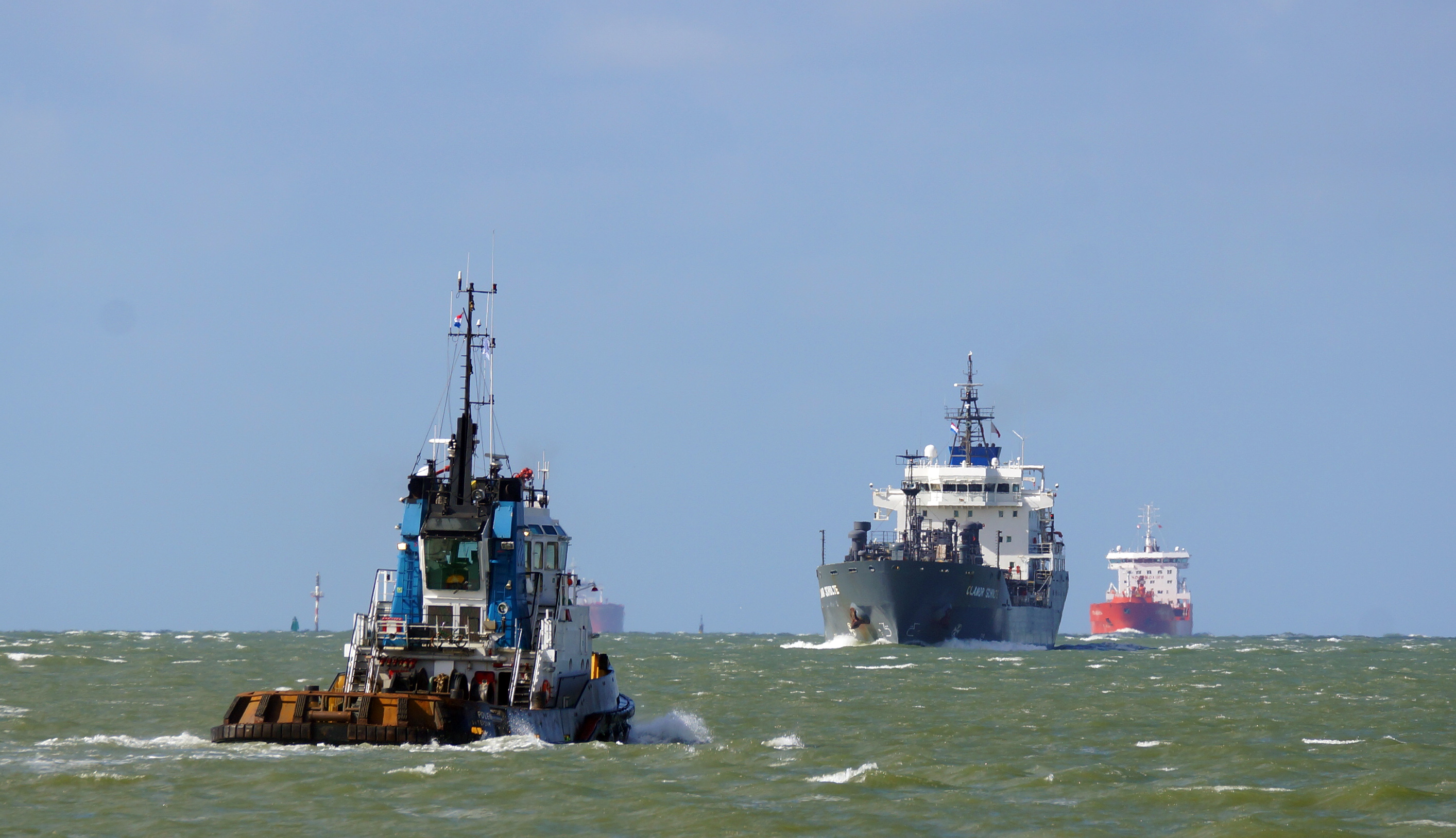
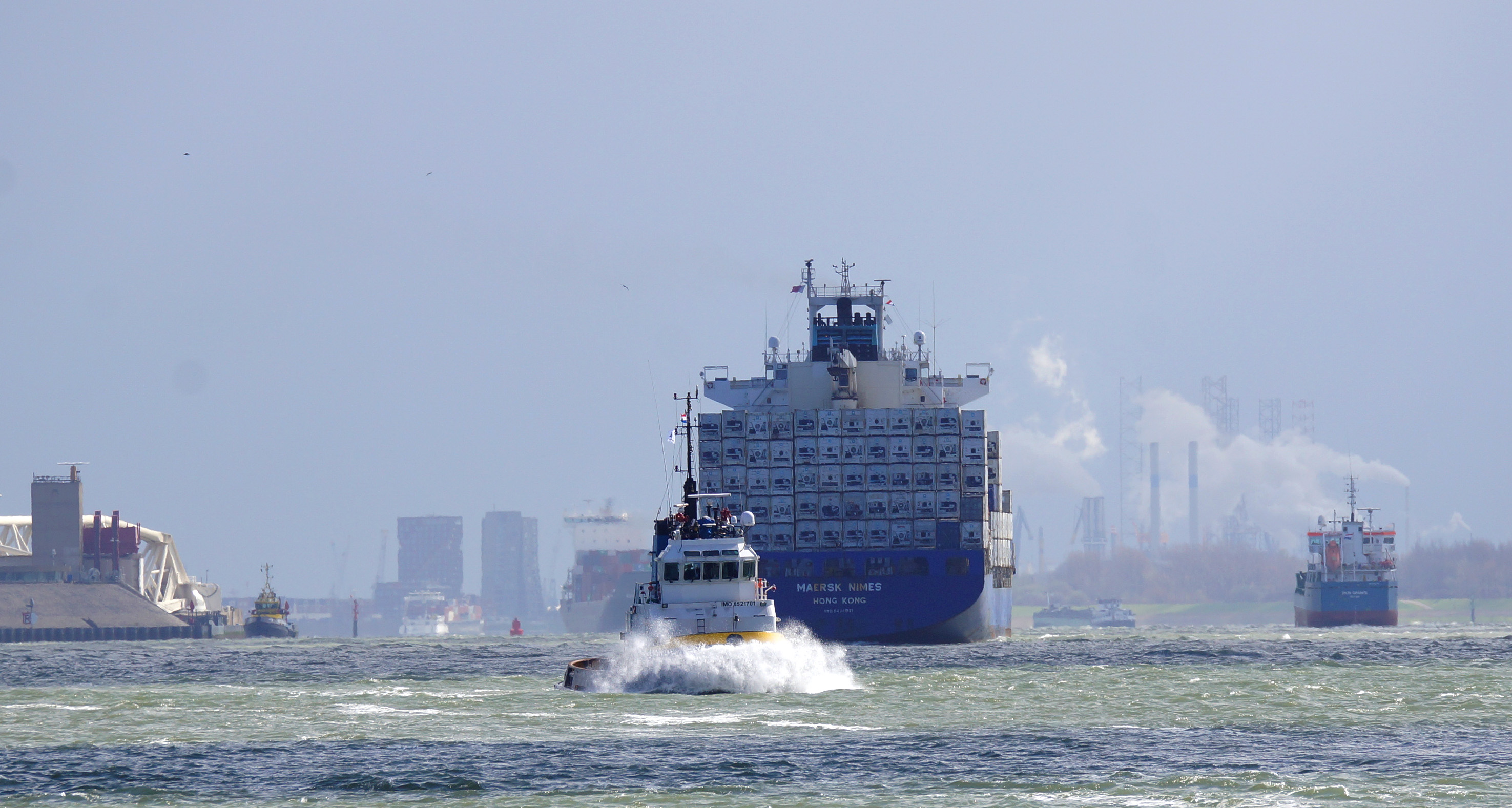
Left to Right: Cargo ships at Takoradi Harbour, Cargo ships with intermodal containers at Takoradi Harbour

The Takoradi harbour is 230 kilometres (140 mi) from Accra, the capital of Ghana. The port receives and exports high volumes of cargo. The management of the harbour is the responsibility of the Ghana Ports and Harbours Authority. The harbour serves as the main export port for Ghana. It handles 65% of total export with about 600 vessels visiting it. The main exports from the harbour are:

- Cocoa
- Timber
- Bauxite
- Manganese

The harbour also serves the international trade purposes of land locked countries in the Sahel region of Africa. Some of the countries are Mali, Burkina Faso and Niger. The harbour transits large volumes of cargo for these countries.

The harbour handles 37% Ghana's seabourn traffic and 62% of national exports. It receives 20% all the imports that the country receives.

== Major works ==
In July 2004, it was announced that a $250 million modernization project which was to upgrade the harbour was to begin. The project included the dredging of wharf and construction of container berths to increase the volume of cargo the harbour could handle. The Authority also constructed a 14-metre (46 ft) high wall around the port. The wall was to improve security and prevent the incidence of stowaways. A few years later in July of 2009, the Authority announced a $700 million project to rehabilitate and upgrade the harbour. This was to make the harbour ready for the country's new oil and gas industry. The project was to include the reclamation and redevelopment of the old log pond into an oil services facility. The oil service facility was to support the country's offshore oil production. Other works that were to be included in the project were:

- dredging
- paving works in the harbour
- the construction of quay walls of 500 metres
- construction of cocoa shed outside the harbour premises
- construction of an oil berth of depth 650 metres

In September 2013 a harbour expansion project commenced. The project was undertaken by Jan De Nul of Belgium.

== See also ==
- Tema Harbour
- Tema Fishing Harbour
- Albert Bosomtwi-Sam Fishing Harbour
