= Kofi Osei-Ameyaw =

Ghanaian politician

Hon. Kofi Osei-Ameyaw

Member of Parliament for Asuogyaman Constituency
- In office 7 January 2013 – 6 January 2017
- President: John Dramani Mahama
- Preceded by: Joses Asare-Akoto
- Succeeded by: Thomas Nyarko Ampem

Member of Parliament for Asuogyaman Constituency
- In office 7 January 2005 – 6 January 2009
- President: John Kufuor
- Succeeded by: Joses Asare-Akoto

Personal details
- Born: 20 February 1960 (age 66)
- Party: New Patriotic Party
- Children: 2
- Education: Macquarie University, Sydney
- Profession: Lawyer

Kofi Osei-Ameyaw is a Ghanaian lawyer and former member of parliament representing the Asuogyaman constituency in the Eastern Region of Ghana. He was a member of parliament of the 4th and 6th Parliaments of the 4th Republic of Ghana. He is a member of the New Patriotic Party.

== Early life and education ==
Osei-Ameyaw was born on February 20, 1960. He hails from Gyakiti-Akwamu in the Eastern Region of Ghana. He is a product of the Macquarie University in Sydney. He obtained a bachelor's degree in law from the university. This was in 1985. He is currently pursuing a master's degree in law at the same university.

== Career ==
Osei-Ameyaw is the founder of Lloyds International College in Sydney, Australia. He was the chairman for Mirage Royal Apartments in East Legon and Careshare Foundation. As of January 2020, he was the director general of the Association of Lotto Marketing Companies.

== Political career ==
Osei-Ameyaw is a member of the New Patriotic Party. He became a member of parliament from January 2005 after emerging winner in the General Election in December 2004. He was the MP for Asuogyaman constituency. He was elected as the member of parliament for this constituency in the fourth and sixth parliament of the fourth Republic of Ghana.

== Elections ==
Osei-Ameyaw was elected as the member of parliament for the Asuogyaman constituency of the Eastern Region of Ghana in the 2004 Ghanaian general elections. He won on the ticket of the New Patriotic Party. His constituency was a part of the 22 parliamentary seats out of 28 seats won by the New Patriotic Party in that election for the Eastern Region. The New Patriotic Party won a majority total of 128 parliamentary seats out of 230 seats. He was elected with 17,806 votes out of 34,479 total valid votes cast. This was equivalent to 51.6% of total valid votes cast. He was elected over Emmanuel Dwamena Bekoe of the National Democratic Congress, Foli Emmanuel Wonder Kwadzo of the Convention People's Party and Joses Asare Akoto and Mustapha Kofi Fiadzigbe both independent candidates. These obtained 15,873, 142, 426 and 146 votes respectively of total valid votes cast. These were equivalent to 46%, 0.4%, 1.2% and 0.4% respectively of total valid votes cast.

In 2008, he lost the general elections to Joses Asare Akoto from the opposition party National Democratic Congress by 1,135 votes. In 2012, he contested again for the same constituency. He won the 2012 general elections on the ticket of the New Patriotic Party. His constituency was part of the 19 parliamentary seats out of 27 seats won by the New Patriotic Party in that election in the Eastern Region. The New Patriotic Party won a minority total of 108 parliamentary seats out of 230 seats. He was elected with 20,750 votes out of 40,415 total valid votes cast. This was equivalent to 51.34% of total valid votes cast. He was selected over Joses Asare Akoto of the National Democratic Congress, Solomon Adu Obuobi of the Progressive People's Party, Slanzy Atsu Wornah of the People's National Convention, Mensah Albert Corbla of the Convention People's Party and Dwamena Bekoe of the National Democratic Party. These obtained 18,650, 624, 39, 95 and 257 votes respectively of the total valid votes cast. These were equivalent to 46.15%, 1.54%, 0.10%, 0.24% and 0.64% respectively of total valid votes cast.

== Personal life ==
Osei-Ameyaw is Christian. He is married with two children.
