= Albert Bosomtwi-Sam =

Ghanaian politician and lawyer (1954–1998)

Hon. Albert Bosomtwi-Sam

Deputy Minister of Interior
- In office 1992–1994
- President: Jerry John Rawlings
- Preceded by: Joseph E. Arbuah
- Succeeded by: Papa Owusu-Ankomah

Member of Parliament for the Sekondi Constituency
- In office 7 January 1993 – 7 January 1997

Personal details
- Born: Albert Bosomtwi-Sam; May 25, 1954 Ghana
- Died: 4 August 1998 (aged 44) Accra
- Party: National Democratic Congress
- Spouse: Cynthia Bosomtwi -Sam
- Children: Victoria, Genevieve and Brigid
- Education: University of Ghana, Ghana School of Law
- Occupation: Politician
- Profession: Lawyer

Albert Bosomtwi-Sam (25 May 1954 – 4 August 1998) was a Ghanaian lawyer and politician. He belonged to the National Democratic Congress (NDC). Bosomtwi-Sam started the Bosumtwi - Sam & Associates Law Firm in Takoradi in the Western Region. He served as Member of Parliament for the Sekondi Constituency from 1992 to 1996. He served as Chief whip of the NDC in the first parliament of the fourth republic of Ghana. Also he served as the deputy Minister of Interior.

== Early life and education ==
Albert Bosomtwi-Sam was born on 25 May 25, 1954, in the Western Region of Ghana. He attended Mfantsipim School in Cape Coast. He went to the University of Ghana and the Ghana School of Law, where he obtained respectively his Bachelor of Laws and the Barrister-at-Law.

== Politics ==
Albert Bosomtwi-Sam was elected during the 1992 Ghanaian parliamentary election as member of the first parliament of the fourth republic of Ghana on the ticket of the National Democratic Congress. Joseph E. Arbuah was a former member of the Secondi constituency in 1979. Bosomtwi-Sam contested the seat again in 1996 Ghanaian general election, but lost against Papa Owusu-Ankomah of the New Patriotic Party (NPP). Owusu-Ankomah polled 28,802 votes, representing 53.80% of the share over his opponents Albert Bosomtwi-Sam, who polled 14,990 votes representing 28.00% of the share, and Anthony Ackah of the People's National Convention (PNC), who polled 715 votes representing 1.30% of the share.

== Fishing harbour ==
A fishing harbour in Sekondi was named after him. The Albert Bosomtwi-Sam Fishing Harbour is operated by the Ghana Ports and Harbours Authority.

== Personal life ==
He was a Christian.

== Death ==
Bosomtwi-Sam died on 4 August 1998.
