= Nyamekye =

Nyamekye is a Ghanaian surname. Notable people with the surname include:

- Anna Nyamekye (born 1954), Ghanaian politician
- Blay Nyamekye Armah (born 1974), Ghanaian lawyer and politician
- Eric Nyamekye (born 1965), Ghanaian Pentecostal televangelist
- Nyamekye Awortwie-Grant (born 2000), German footballer
- Stella Nyamekye (born 2005), Ghanaian footballer
