= Albert Bosomtwi-Sam Fishing Harbour =

Harbor in Sekondi, Ghana

Coordinates: 4°56′29″N 1°42′29″W

The Albert Bosomtwi-Sam Fishing Harbour is a harbour where fishing boats are tied up in Sekondi in the Western Region of Ghana. It along with the Tema Fishing Harbour are the only two fishing harbours in Ghana. It is operated by the Ghana Ports and Harbours Authority. The fishing harbour is named after the late Hon. Albert Bosomtwi-Sam, in whose constituency the fishing harbour was built. Prior to the name change it was known as the Sekondi Fishing Port. The construction of the fishing harbour was started in 1988 by the Japanese Grant Aid Cooperation (JICA).

== Expansion works ==
In 2016 expansion works begun on the harbour to increase to number of canoes and boats that could birth at the harbour. A Japanese grant of $20 million was secured by the port authority to complete the project. The expansion works included the construction of ice making plant to produce 15 tonnes of ice per day and the construction of an additional administration office complex.
