= Tema Fishing Harbour =

Ghanaian fishing harbour

The Team Fishing Harbour is a harbour where fishing boats are tied up in Tema in the Greater Accra Region of Ghana. It along with the Albert Bosomtwi-Sam Fishing Harbour are the only two fishing harbours in Ghana. It is operated by the Ghana Ports and Harbours Authority.
