= Paul Seidu Tanye‑Kulono =

Ghanaian military officer and administrator

Acting Director‑General of GPHA
- Incumbent
- Assumed office February 2025
- President: John Dramani Mahama
- Preceded by: Michael Achagwe Luguje

Personal details
- Born: Ghana
- Education: University of Ghana; Osmania University; George Washington University; Ghana School of Law; Royal Military Academy Sandhurst; US Army Command and General Staff College
- Occupation: Military officer, lawyer, public servant

Paul Seidu Tanye‑Kulono is a Ghanaian military officer, legal professional, and administrator who currently serves as Director‑General of the Ghana Ports and Harbours Authority (GPHA). He was appointed to this role by President John Dramani Mahama in February 2025.

== Early life and education ==
Seidu Tanye‑Kulono was born in Ghana. He holds a Master of Laws (LL.M.) in Litigation and Alternative Dispute Resolution from George Washington University in the United States, a Master of Management Studies from Osmania University in India and a Master of Arts in International Affairs from the University of Ghana.

He also completed military training at institutions, including the Royal Military Academy Sandhurst in the United Kingdom and the United States Army Command and General Staff College. He is a graduate of the Ghana Armed Forces Command and Staff College and the Kofi Annan International Peacekeeping Training Centre. He was called to the Ghana Bar in 2015

== Career ==
Tanye‑Kulono has served in several roles within the Ghana Armed Forces, including Deputy Commandant of the National College of Defence Studies, Assistant Commandant at Training and Doctrine Command, and Deputy Director‑General of Training at the General Headquarters. . He also served in United Nations peacekeeping missions as Deputy Force Provost Marshal and Officer in Charge of Special Investigations at UNIFIL headquarters in Lebanon.

=== Acting Director‑General of GPHA (from February 2025) ===
On 7 February 2025, President John Dramani Mahama announced the appointment of Brig. Gen. Paul Seidu Tanye‑Kulono as Acting Director‑General of GPHA.

He has publicly advocated for the removal of VAT and COVID‑19 levies on transit cargo.
