= Joses Asare-Akoto =

Ghanaian politician

Hon. Joses Asare-Akoto
- Constituency: Asuogyaman

Member of Parliament
- In office 7 January 2009 – 6 January 2013
- President: John Atta Mills
- Preceded by: Kofi Osei-Ameyaw
- Succeeded by: Kofi Osei-Ameyaw
- Majority: NDC

Personal details
- Born: 25 December 1950 (age 75)
- Party: National Democratic Congress
- Children: 5
- Education: City and Guilds
- Occupation: Reverend Minister

Joses Asare-Akoto (born 25 December 1950) is a Ghanaian politician and a member of parliament of the Fifth Parliament of the Fourth Republic of Ghana. He represented the Asuogyaman Constituency in the Eastern Region on the ticket of the National Democratic Congress.

== Early life and education ==
Asare-Akoto hails from Akwamufie, a town in the Eastern Region of Ghana. He attended the City and Guilds College in 1973.

== Career ==
Asare-Akoto is a minister and was a Pastor at Church of Philadelphia International.

== Politics ==
Asare-Akoto is a member of the National Democratic Congress (NDC). He contested for the Asuogyaman constituency seat on the ticket of the NDC in the 2008 Ghanaian general elections and won. He was elected with 16,608 votes out of the 32,372 total valid votes cast, equivalent to 51.3% of total valid votes cast. He was elected over Kofi Osei-Ameyaw of the New Patriotic Party, Slanzy Atsu Wornah of the People's National Convention and Agnes Deprah Ayensu of the Convention People's Party. These obtained 47.80%, 0.33% and 0.57% respectively of total valid votes cast.

== Personal life ==
He identifies as a Christian (Church of Philadelphia International) and is married with five children.
