= Chemu Senior High School =

Chemu Secondary School

Location
- P. O. Box; Tema Community 4 Greater Accra Region; Tema; Ghana
- Coordinates: 5°39′31.4″N 0°00′30.9″W

Information
- School type: Public High School coeducational
- Motto: Discipline and Hardwork
- Status: active
- Oversight: Ministry of Education
- Gender: Unisex
- Age: 14 to 18
- Classes offered: Home Economics, General Science, General Arts, Visual Arts, Technical
- Slogan: Pride of Tema
- Affiliation: Ghana
- Website: www.chemushs.org

Chemu Secondary School is a coeducational second-cycle institution at Tema, in the Greater Accra Region of Ghana. It is a day-boarding school (no provision of hostel) that is located at Community four in Tema.

== History ==
The school became established when the Ghanaian Secretary of the Ministry of Education at the time, Ama Atta Aidoo, sought to alleviate the problem of high boarding fees and wanted to increase the enrollment of students in day schools. Chemu also met with the increasing demand of vacancies in secondary schools in the Tema Township, situated in the Greater Accra Region of Ghana; hence the conversion of the Community 4 No. 2 Middle School into a model day secondary school known as Tema Day Secondary school. The school has a legacy of eight (8) classrooms, along with the motto 'Discipline and Hard work'. The school was formally opened on 12 October 1982 with a double stream of 86 students and a teaching staff of nine (9). The then-assistant headmaster of Tema Secondary School, late Mr. P.K. Dzitri was seconded to the school as Acting Headmaster, in 1982. In the same year the Assistant Bursar of Tema Secondary School, Mr. Gilbert Kpelende was also seconded to the school. The first batches of students were, therefore, remnants of the Common Entrance candidates of Tema Secondary School, since the name of the school was not on the Common Entrance List. A few students entered into the addition through a late entrance examination conducted by the school. Following an appeal from Tema traditional council, the name of the school changed from Tema day school to Chemu secondary school. Attempts were made to have the name of the school changed in the early nineties to Adjetey Ansah Secondary school, but this did not materialize due to stiff opposition from some quarters, including the Students’ Representative Council.

== Academics ==
Chemu Secondary School offers the following programmes: Science; General Arts; Visual Arts; Home Economics and Technical. The number of classrooms currently available is about forty (40). The school boasts a big canteen, sickbay, a changing room, and a KVIP constructed with the assistance from PAMSCAD, an ultra-modern washroom built with the aid of the Tema Metropolitan Assembly and other stakeholders, a basketball court, an assembly hall, two school buses, among several other facilities worth mentioning. The school from its humble beginnings rose up to fame within a short amount of time and chalked very impressive successes in the academic field, sports, and other related fields rubbing shoulders with the very old and provided for school. Some examples of the few achievements and progress made in these fields include the high percentage passes recorded and recent history made by placing 3rd in the National Science and Mathematics Quiz at the first entry in 2001. The school also won the Best Teacher Award, Tema District secondary school level for years 1996 and 1999. The school won the 3rd position at the Regional level in 1995 and 1st in 2002. In other areas like Sports, the school has produced great athletes like Monica Twum, who was at the Olympic game squad and also football players that include Dan Addo and Attakora Amaniampong who were among the Cup-winning Black Starlets squad of 1991 and 1995 respectively. These are a few of the numerous accomplishments made by the school.

== Courses ==
The school offers courses in General Science, General Art, Business, Visual Art, Technical and Home Economics.
