= Tema Community 4 =

- Country: Ghana
- Region: Greater Accra Region

Tema Community 4 is a residential area in Tema in the Greater Accra Region of Ghana. This part of Tema is known for the Chemu Secondary Secondary School. The school is a second cycle institution.
