= Tema =

- City
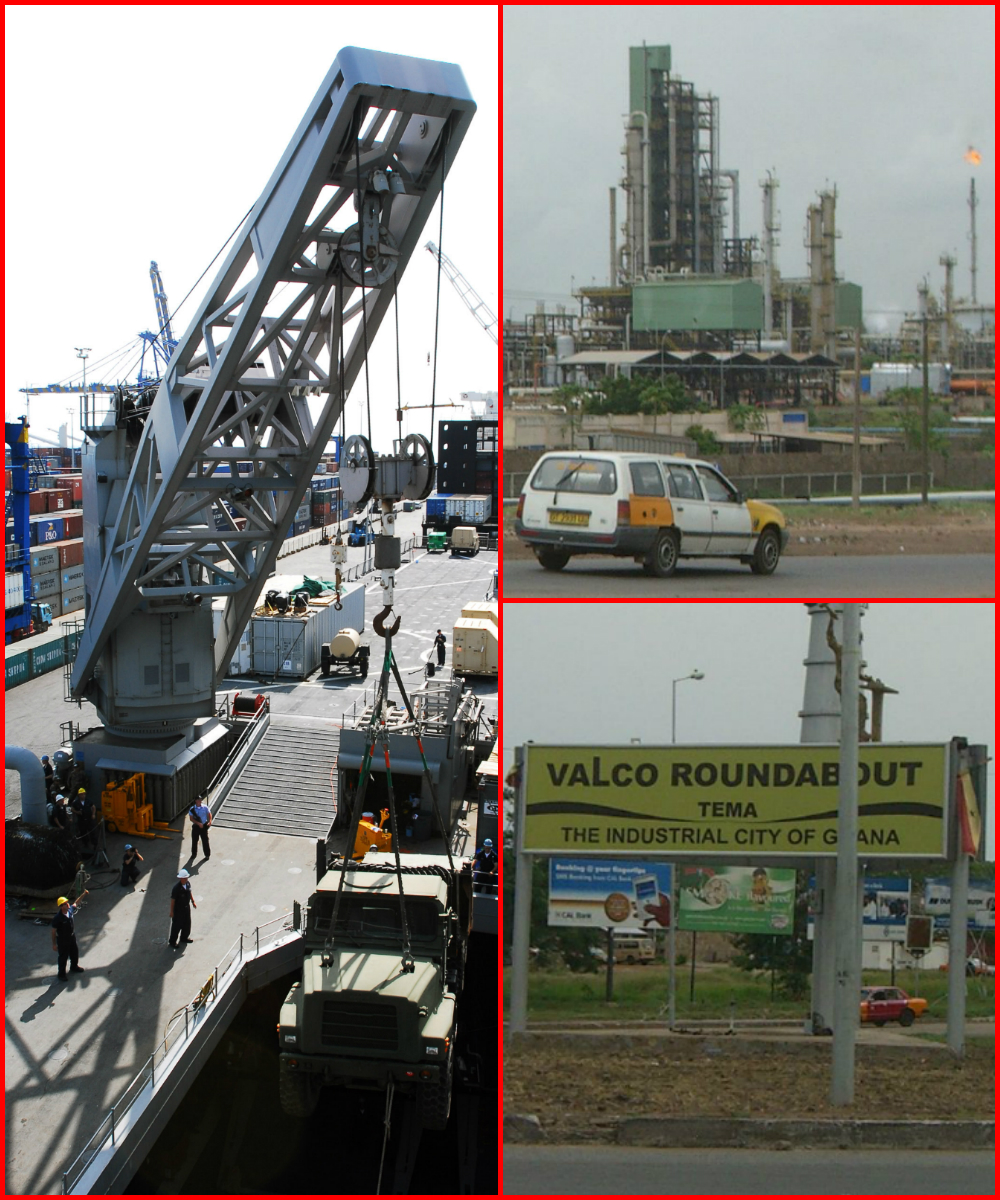
- First-left picture: Cargo ships with Intermodal containers being loaded in the Industrial Tema Harbour • First-top right picture: Petroleum Processing and Refining Plant and Natural-Gas Processing Plant in Tema • Second-bottom right picture: Valco Roundabout of State-owned Aluminium Corporation Valco (Volta Aluminum Company) in Tema

- Location in Ghana Location in Africa
- Coordinates: 05°40′N 00°00′W
- Country: Ghana
- Admin. Region: Greater Accra Region
- District: Tema Metropolitan District

Government
  - Mayor: Felix Mensah Nii Anang-La
- Elevation: 1 m (3.3 ft)

Population (2013)
  - Total: 161,612
- Time zone: UTC+00:00 (GMT)
- Postal codes: GT000 – GT345
- Area code: 030
- Website: http://tma.gov.gh

Tema is a city on the Bight of Benin and Atlantic coast of Ghana. It is located 25 kilometres (16 mi) east of the capital city; Accra, in the region of Greater Accra, and is the capital of the Tema Metropolitan District. As of 2013, Tema is the eleventh most populous settlement in Ghana, with a population of approximately 161,612 people – a marked decrease from its 2005 figure of 209,000. The Greenwich Meridian (00 Longitude) passes directly through the city. It also had the Meridian Rock. Tema is locally nicknamed the "Harbour City" because of its status as Ghana's largest seaport. It consists of 25 different communities which are numbered accordingly with each of them having easy access to the basic amenities.

Tema is a city built on the site of a small fishing village. Tema was commissioned by Ghana's first president, Kwame Nkrumah, and grew rapidly after the construction of a large harbor in 1961. The Tema metropolis was designed, planned and developed by the award-winning urban planner and Ghana's first architect, Theodore S. Clerk. The design team included a number of architects trained in London at the Architectural Association. It is now a major trading center, home to an oil refinery and numerous factories, and is linked to Accra by a highway and railway. Tema is one of Ghana's two deep seaports, the other being Sekondi-Takoradi. Tema became an Autonomous Council in 1974 and was elevated to the status of a Metropolitan Assembly in December 1990. Tema metropolitan forms part of the sixteen Metropolis, Municipalities and Districts in the Greater Accra Region. The Metropolitan shares boundaries with Ashaiman Municipal, Adenta Municipal District, and Ledzokuku-Krowor Municipal District to the west respectively, to the east with Kpone Katamanso District, to the North with Dangme West District and to the South with the Gulf of Guinea.

== History ==
Tema was built on the site of a small fishing village called Torman, named for the local name of the calabash plant, Tor, which was cultivated there. "Tema" is derived from a corruption of "Torman". The government identified the site before independence, and in 1952 acquired 166 square kilometres (64 mi^{2}) of land north of the harbor, which was entrusted to the Tema Development Corporation for the new industrial and residential development. The villagers of Torman migrated to a new fishing ground around 3 kilometres (1.9 mi) away, which they called Newtown.

The main Tema Township was constructed, and the Tema Harbour officially opened, in 1962. Over the following decades, Tema grew into the industrial hub of Ghana, with a carefully constructed road layout featuring landscaping and street lights. It boasted modern recreational centres and other social amenities rare among African cities at the time. President Nkrumah appointed Theophilus Asiaw Mills as the first District Commissioner. The importance of Tema as a port and industrial hub is reflected by the fact that the Ghana Police Service maintains a special policing region devoted entirely to the city.

A large population influx began in the 1960s owing to the town's employment opportunities, but the Tema Development Corporation was unable to construct housing and provide other services to meet the needs of the migrants. The Tema Newtown district was overwhelmed by the sudden population growth, and became the poor cousin of Tema Township, receiving none of the latter's improved housing, geometrically laid roads, or social amenities. Moreover, royalties paid by Tema Newtown's companies to evicted villagers have not been used due to a chieftaincy dispute. The area's fishing potential was thus not fully exploited.

== Climate ==
Tema is characterised by a hot semi-arid climate (BSh under the Köppen climate classification). It lies in the driest part of southern Ghana, experiencing average annual rainfall of about 750 millimetres (30 in). Average temperatures are very warm to hot year-round, typically exceeding 28 °C or 82.4 °F every day of the year, whilst minima never typically fall under 23 °C or 73.4 °F.

Climate data for Tema (1991–2020)
| Month | Jan | Feb | Mar | Apr | May | Jun | Jul | Aug | Sep | Oct | Nov | Dec | Year |
|---|---|---|---|---|---|---|---|---|---|---|---|---|---|
| Record high °C (°F) | 35.6 (96.1) | 35.5 (95.9) | 36.0 (96.8) | 34.6 (94.3) | 34.6 (94.3) | 32.5 (90.5) | 31.0 (87.8) | 31.2 (88.2) | 31.9 (89.4) | 33.0 (91.4) | 33.5 (92.3) | 34.5 (94.1) | 36.0 (96.8) |
| Mean daily maximum °C (°F) | 31.2 (88.2) | 31.8 (89.2) | 31.8 (89.2) | 31.6 (88.9) | 31.0 (87.8) | 29.3 (84.7) | 27.9 (82.2) | 27.5 (81.5) | 28.6 (83.5) | 30.1 (86.2) | 31.3 (88.3) | 31.5 (88.7) | 30.3 (86.5) |
| Daily mean °C (°F) | 28.1 (82.6) | 28.9 (84.0) | 29.0 (84.2) | 28.8 (83.8) | 28.2 (82.8) | 26.9 (80.4) | 25.8 (78.4) | 25.3 (77.5) | 26.2 (79.2) | 27.3 (81.1) | 28.3 (82.9) | 28.5 (83.3) | 27.6 (81.7) |
| Mean daily minimum °C (°F) | 25.0 (77.0) | 26.0 (78.8) | 26.2 (79.2) | 26.0 (78.8) | 25.5 (77.9) | 24.5 (76.1) | 23.6 (74.5) | 23.0 (73.4) | 23.8 (74.8) | 24.5 (76.1) | 25.4 (77.7) | 25.5 (77.9) | 24.9 (76.8) |
| Record low °C (°F) | 20.2 (68.4) | 21.1 (70.0) | 20.8 (69.4) | 19.8 (67.6) | 21.0 (69.8) | 19.3 (66.7) | 19.7 (67.5) | 18.3 (64.9) | 20.7 (69.3) | 20.6 (69.1) | 21.2 (70.2) | 20.1 (68.2) | 18.3 (64.9) |
| Average precipitation mm (inches) | 8.4 (0.33) | 22.0 (0.87) | 51.3 (2.02) | 89.0 (3.50) | 141.3 (5.56) | 183.9 (7.24) | 59.6 (2.35) | 15.0 (0.59) | 35.5 (1.40) | 62.1 (2.44) | 25.2 (0.99) | 14.7 (0.58) | 708.0 (27.87) |
| Average precipitation days (≥ 1.0 mm) | 0.5 | 1.3 | 3.4 | 4.8 | 8.6 | 9.6 | 3.8 | 2.3 | 3.9 | 4.7 | 2.3 | 1.1 | 46.3 |
Source: NOAA

== Economy ==
=== Industry ===
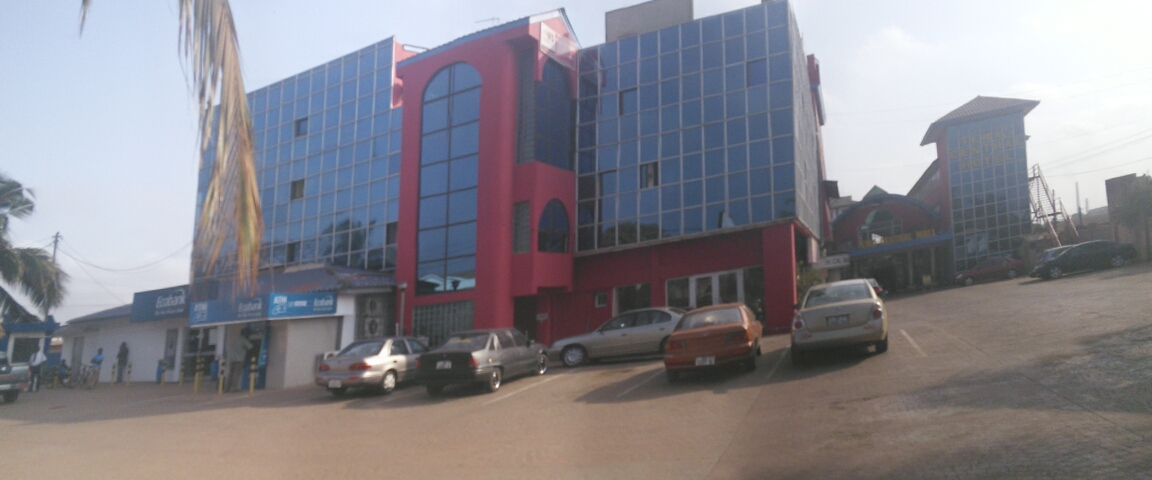
Tema Central Shopping Mall

The town's chief industrial products include aluminium, steel, processed fish, refined petroleum, textile, chemicals, food products, and cement. Major companies operating in Tema include Volta Aluminium (VALCO), Tema Oil Refinery (TOR), Nestlé Ghana Ltd., Wahome Steel Ltd, Tema Shipyard. There is also a free zone enclave in Tema.

=== Seaport ===
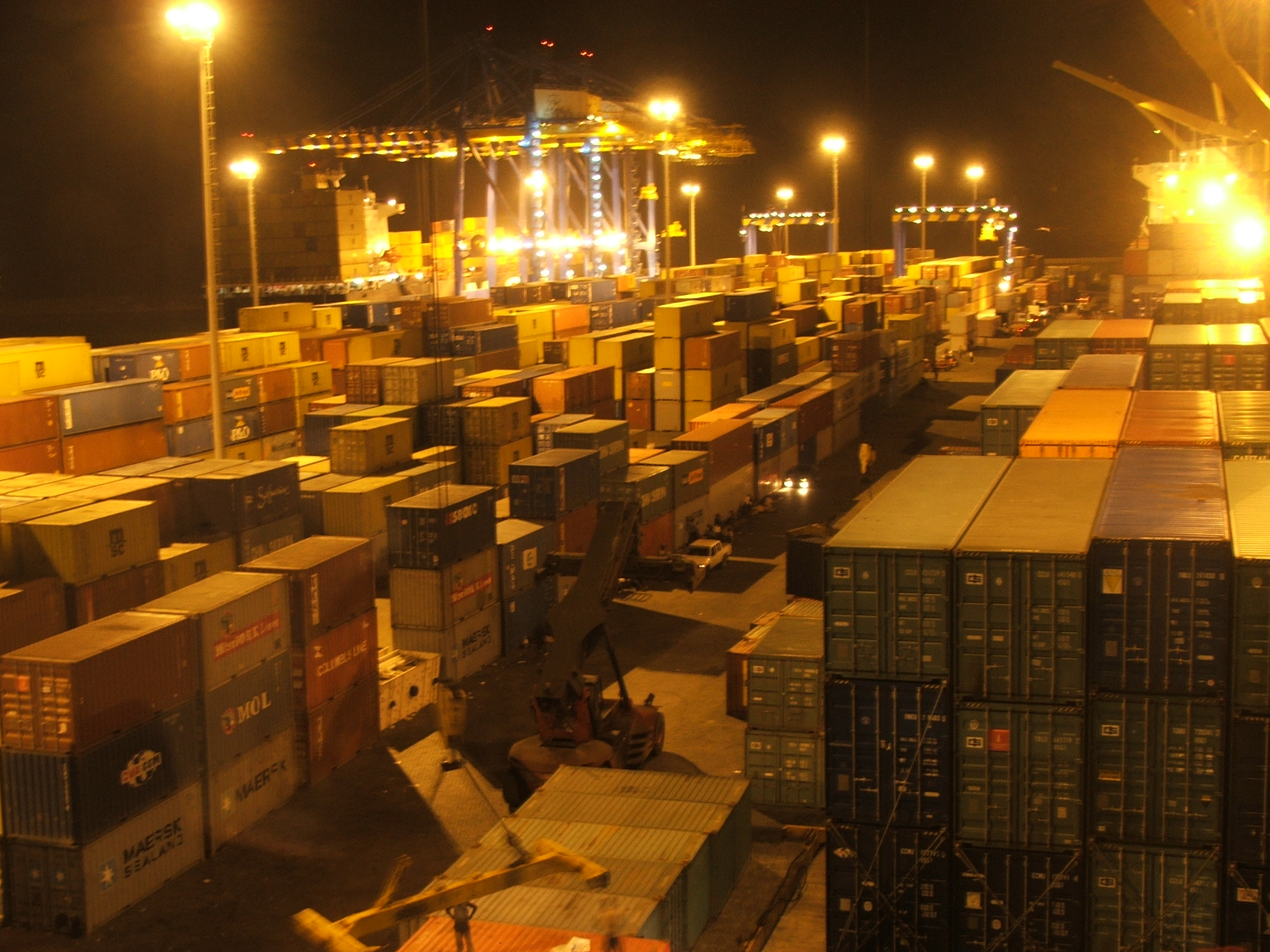
A container terminal at Tema Port in 2008

Tema Port, which was opened in 1962, is the bigger of the two seaports in Ghana. In 2020 a $1.5 billion expansion project to increase container output to 3 million TEU was completed. The port is currently one of the largest container ports in Africa. It has a water-enclosed area of 1.7 square kilometres (0.66 mi^{2}) and a total land area of 3.9 square kilometres (1.5 mi^{2}). Apart from handling Ghanaian imports and exports, it is also a traffic junction, dealing with transit cargo destined for the landlocked countries of Burkina Faso, Mali and Niger. The port of Tema handles 80% of Ghana's import and export cargo, including the country's chief export, cacao.

The port has 5 kilometres (3.1 mi) of breakwaters, 12 deepwater berths, an outsize oil tanker berth, a dockyard, warehouses, and transit sheds. The port has open and covered areas for the storage of cargo, including a 77,200 m^{2} (7.7 hectares) paved area for the storage of containers, steel products and other conventional cargo. The port's container yard is capable of holding over 8,000 TEUs at any given time. The closed storage area, which is about 25,049 m^{2} (2.5 hectares) in area, consists of six sheds with a total storage capacity of 50,000 tonnes of cargo. The port also includes a 100,000 dwt dry dock and slipway facility. The harbour is operated by the Ghana Ports and Harbours Authority.

=== Fishing harbor ===
Ghana has a long history of fishing. The Tema fishing harbour is at the eastern end of the town's commercial harbour. It comprises the Inner Fishing Harbour, the Canoe Basin, the Outer Fishing Harbour, and a commercial area with marketing and cold storage facilities.

The Inner Fishing Harbour was constructed along the Tema Main Port in 1962 to provide a handling facility for semi-industrial and industrial fishing vessels, and to encourage the development of the local fishing industry. In 1965, the Outer Fishing Harbour was constructed for bigger industrial vessels such as trawlers, tuna vessels, and deep-sea carriers. The trawlers operating in the area are 30–45 m (98–148 ft) long and are able to land 55–65 tonnes of fish (usually redfish and club and scad mackerel) per fishing trip. The tuna vessels range from smaller boats around 45–50 m (148–164 ft) in length, able to land 200–250 tonnes of catch, to larger versions with a length of 50–65 m (164–213 ft) and the ability to land up to 650 tonnes per fishing trip. The largest fishing vessels, the deep-sea carriers (with lengths of 90–105 m, 295–344 ft), are mostly chartered vessels. Since 1984, the national catch has averaged about 200,000 to 300,000 metric tonnes per annum. Ghana's tuna catch has maintained a stable level of 30,000 tonnes per annum since 1981.

The Canoe Basin caters for the artisanal fishermen. The basin is normally occupied by about 400 canoes. These are mainly two types: wooden vessels, locally called "Legelege", and metallic vessels. The wooden canoes have lengths over all (LOA) ranging between 30 and 70 m (98 and 230 ft), mainly owned and operated by indigenous Ghanaians. Their operations peak during the months of June–September. Artisanal canoe fishing is responsible for about 70% of the catch.

=== Development ===
The Tema Development Corporation (TDC) is a public entity tasked with the planning and development of the entire city of Tema. Affordable public housing was developed by the government in conjunction with TDC and the State Housing Corporation. The corporation has been instrumental in developing the harbour area of Tema in particular, with modern housing. The corporation was set up in 1952 with the sole aim to develop and manage the township of Tema. In 1963, the Tema Development Corporation Act was passed. In recent years the corporation has had much investment from Korea, including plans, as of 2013, to build a new stadium, an idea which proved unpopular with squatters. The first chief executive officer of the corporation was Theodore S. Clerk, the first Ghanaian architect and award-winning urban planner who served in the CEO position from 1963 after the enactment of the statute, until 1965. Despite the busy nature of the city and a major economic hub of Ghana, the city continue to begrudge with heavy traffic usually caused by heavy poryholes around various roundabouts.

== Transportation ==
There are Public Transports from Tema to major cities such as Kumasi; Accra; Mim, Ahafo; Cape Coast, Sunyani; Takoradi; Tamale; Ho; Wa; Bolgatanga; Elubo; Aflao, Techiman.

== Education ==
SOS-Hermann Gmeiner International College (SOS-HGIC), a private mixed boarding school catering to the 10th through 13th grades, is located in Tema. It previously used the International General Certificate of Secondary Education (IGCSE) for the 10th and 11th grades and the International Baccalaureate (IB) for the 12th and 13th grades, but currently runs the full IB Diploma program for all four grades. The school was headed by Margaret Nkrumah for over 15 years, and is now headed by Mr Israel Titi Ofei and Nii Amaa Akita.

Tema also has an international school, Tema International School (TIS), which is second to HGIC, and a senior high school, Tema Secondary School (TSS or Temasco), which was built on 22 September 1961. Tema has a number of public secondary schools such as Chemu Senior High School in Community 4, Tema Methodist Day School, Mahean Senior High School, Our Lady of Mercy Senior High School and Tema Technical Institute.

Private preparatory schools include Roberts Memorial School, Creator Schools, St Paul Methodist Primary and JHS, Marbs Preparatory School, Datus Complex, Deks Educational Institute, Naylor SDA School, Tema Christian Centre, Tema Parents Association, First Baptist School, Tema Regular Baptist School, Queen Esther School, Dorsons School, Adwenie Memorial, Creator School, New Covenant School, St Alban's School, Lorenz Wolf School, Bexhill School Complex, Life International School, Mazon Grace Academy, Santabarbera School, Angels Specialist School, First Star Academy, Pentecost School, Star School Complex, Tema Ridge, St John Bosco School and Rosharon Montessori School.

Public primary and junior high schools in Tema include Twedaase Primary School, Star School, Aggrey Road School, Republic Road School, Padmore School, Mante Din Drive, Amen Basic, Manhean SDA School, and Bethel Methodist School.

== Twin cities ==
| | Country | | City | County / district / region / state | Date |
|---|---|---|---|---|---|
| (United Kingdom) | United Kingdom | | Greenwich | Greater London | 1990 |
| (United States) | United States | San Diego, California | San Diego | California | 1976 |
| (United States) | United States | Norfolk, Virginia | Norfolk | Virginia | 2010 |
| (United States) | United States | Howard County, MD | Columbia | Maryland | 2013 |
| (United States) | United States | Cleveland, Ohio | Cleveland | Ohio | 2023 |

== Notable people ==
- Jewel Ackah - musician
- Freddy Adu - footballer
- Kwesi Arthur - rapper, musician
- Mary Ghansah - gospel musician
- Felix Nartey - social entrepreneur and 2017 Wikimedian of the Year
- Eric Ocansey, footballer
- Nii Okai - gospel musician
- Sarkodie - rapper
