= Tema Harbour =

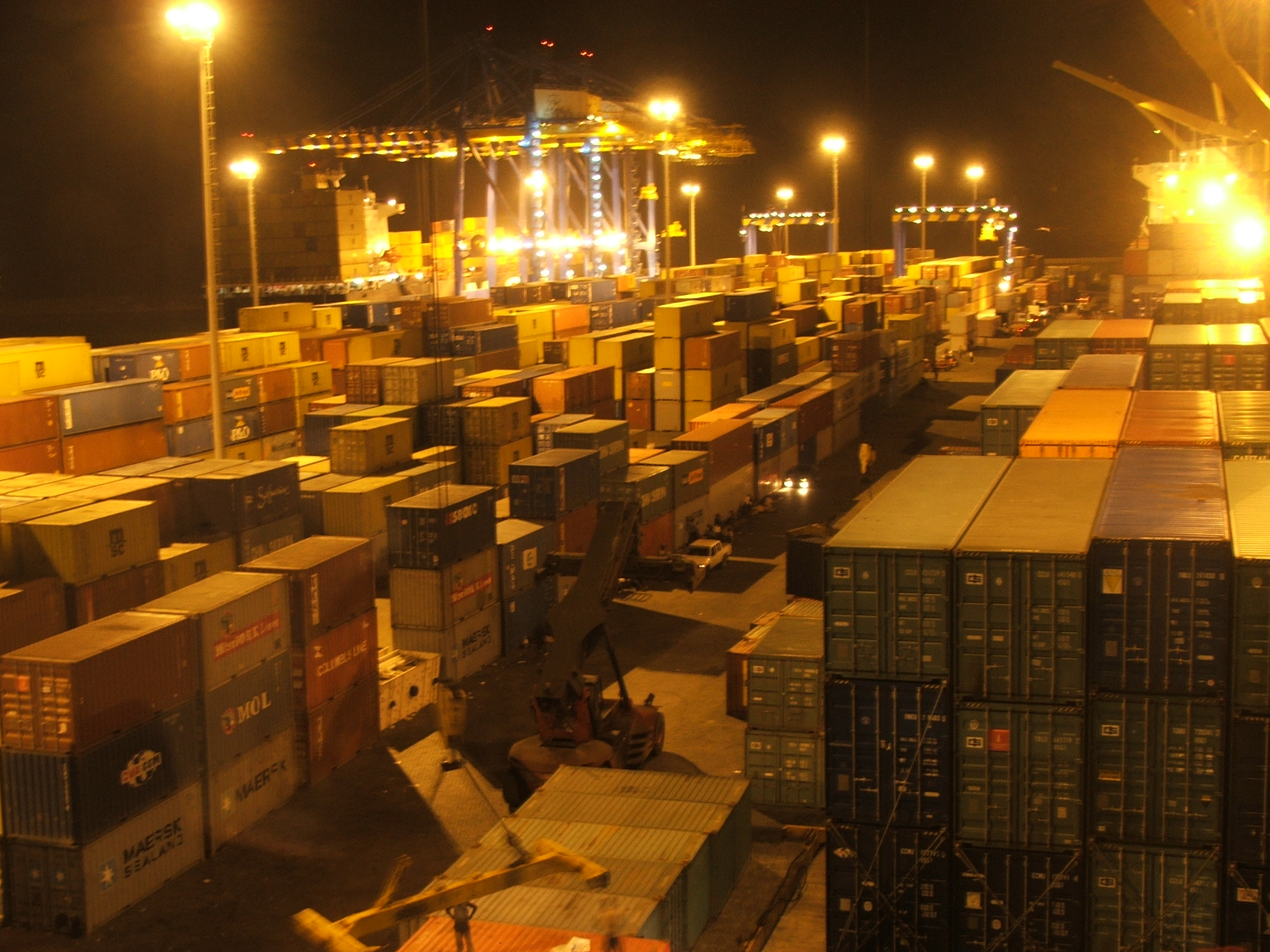
- A container terminal at Tema Port
- Interactive map of Tema Harbour
- Location within Ghana

Location
- Country: Republic of Ghana
- Location: Tema, Ghana
- Coordinates: 05°38′00″N 00°00′01″E
- UN/LOCODE: GHTEM

Details
- No. of berths: 22
- Draft depth: 16.0 m.

Statistics
- Website www.ghanaports.gov.gh

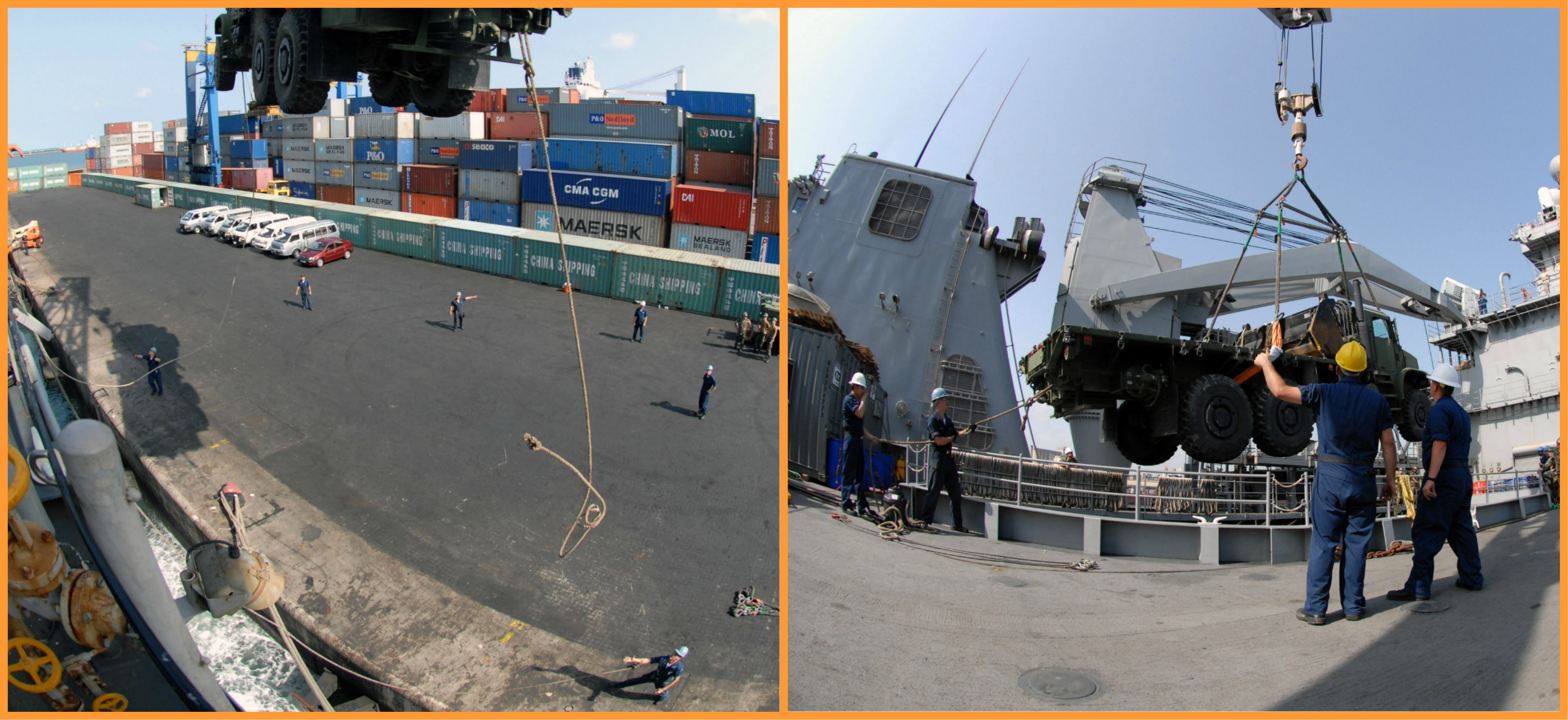
Container ships and Merchant ships being loaded and unloaded at the Intermodal freight transport of Tema Harbour.

Tema Harbour is a harbour located in Tema in the southeastern part of Ghana, along the Gulf of Guinea. Tema Harbour is a member of the International Association of Ports and Harbours (IAPH).

== History of the harbour ==
The construction of the harbour was proposed by British Colonial Officers in the Gold Coast before its independence. An old fishing village called Torman was the proposed site for the harbour's construction. The rapid industrialization that followed Ghana's independence led to the town adopting the name Tema from that of the fishing village. After independence, under the leadership of Ghana's first president Kwame Nkrumah, the construction of the harbour began in the 1950s with planning led by the award-winning city planner and the first Ghanaian architect, Theodore S. Clerk. and was commissioned in 1962.

In 2014 the Meridian Rock, a monument to mark the crossing between the Prime Meridian and the Equator, was unveiled in the harbour.

As part of a visit of the Prime Minister of Barbados to Ghana in November 2019, a sister-port agreement was signed between Port Tema and the Bridgetown Port located in the Caribbean.

== Area of the harbour ==
Tema Harbour is made up of almost four million square metres of land, with almost half of it made by closed seas.

== Harbour activities ==
At Tema, the harbor primarily sends cacao beans. Shipments for Northern African countries are also processed at Tema. The harbour handles 80% of Ghana's national exports and imports.

== Tema Harbour expansion ==
The Tema Harbour and Port of Tema is undergoing an expansion and investment of $115 million in infrastructural upgrading at the Tema harbour and port of Tema as part of efforts aimed at expanding facilities of Tema port to meet decreasing cargo traffic by the Ghana Ports and Harbours Authority (GPHA); and in which the expansion and investment will go into the purchase and instalment of cranes, reach-stackers, ship to shore cranes, among others. The harbour upgrades will improve the cargo-handling capacity of the Tema harbour and port; and the amount of freight will continue to rise as Ghana's economy maintains its high rate of growth, with expansion tipped to come in at just under 8% in 2013.

== Sister Seasports ==
- – Port of Bridgetown, Barbados (2019)
- – Port of Casablanca, Morocco (2017)

== See also ==
- Takoradi Harbour
- Ghana Ports and Harbours Authority
