= Sekondi (Ghana parliament constituency) =

Twin town and capital of Western Region Ghana

- constituency for the Parliament of Ghana
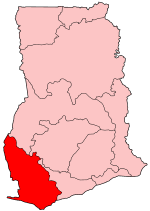
- District: Shama Ahanta East Metropolitan District
- Region: Western Region of Ghana

Current constituency
- Party: National Democratic Congress
- MP: Blay Nyameke Armah

Sekondi is one of the constituencies represented in the Parliament of Ghana. It elects one Member of Parliament (MP) by the first past the post system of election. Sekondi is located in the Sekondi Takoradi Metropolitan Assembly of the Western Region of Ghana. The current Member of Parliament is Hon. Blay Nyameke Armah.

== Boundaries ==
The seat is located within STMA of the Western Region of Ghana. It was formed prior to the 1992 December presidential and parliamentary elections.

== Members of Parliament ==
Election	Member	Party
1992	Albert Bosomtwi-Sam	National Democratic Congress
1996	Papa Owusu-Ankomah	New Patriotic Party
2000	Papa Owusu-Ankomah	New Patriotic Party
2004	Papa Owusu-Ankomah	New Patriotic Party
2008	Papa Owusu-Ankomah	New Patriotic Party
2012	Papa Owusu-Ankomah	New Patriotic Party
2016	Andrew Egyapa Mercer	New Patriotic Party
2020	Andrew Egyapa Mercer	New Patriotic Party
2024	Blay Nyameke Armah	National Democratic Congress

== See also ==
- List of Ghana Parliament constituencies
