= Blay Nyameke Armah =

Ghanaian politician and lawyer

Hon. Blay Nyameke Armah

Member of Parliament for Sekondi Constituency
- Incumbent
- Assumed office 7 January 2025
- Preceded by: Andrew Egyapa Mercer

Personal details
- Born: November 25, 1974 (age 51) Sekondi, Western Region, Ghana
- Party: National Democratic Congress
- Education: University of Ghana, Birmingham City University, University of Westminster
- Profession: Lawyer, Politician

Blay Nyameke Armah is a Ghanaian lawyer and politician who serves as the member of parliament for the Sekondi constituency in the Ninth Parliament of the Fourth Republic of Ghana. He was elected on the ticket of the National Democratic Congress (NDC).

== Early life and education ==
Armah was born on 25 November 1974 in Sekondi, located in the Sekondi-Takoradi Metropolis of Ghana's Western Region. His early childhood education started from St. Andrews Anglican Day Nursery in Sekondi and then Young Christian Preparatory School in Takoradi where he wrote the Common Entrance Examination for Secondary School Education. He enrolled with Kwame Nkrumah Senior High School (formerly Nsien Secondary School) located in Axim in Ghana's Western Region for his Ordinary Level Certificate. He was admitted to the University Practice Secondary School (UNIPRA) in Cape Coast located in the Central Region of Ghana for his Sixth form education and obtained the Advanced Level Certificate. He served as the Entertainment Prefect in UNIPRA and was an athlete who competed in the 400 meters sprint event and a goal keeper in the men's soccer team. His tertiary education started from the University of Ghana where he read Public Administration. He later relocated to the United Kingdom where he obtained a postgraduate diploma in Human Rights and Immigration Law and Practice from the Birmingham City University. He later earned a Master of Laws from the University of Westminster and also obtained his Legal Practice Certificate (LPC).

== Career ==
Armah had his practice training with CW Law Solicitors. He worked as director of Cool Running Cleaning Limited in the United Kingdom. He also served as an immigration adviser and caseworker at The Hurricane, CW Law Solicitors, and Armah Bola Law Practice.

== Political career ==
Armah was elected to Parliament on the ticket of the NDC, defeating Andrew Egyapa Mercer to represent the Sekondi constituency in the Ninth Parliament.

== Personal life ==
Armah is of Nzema ethnicity, a subgroup of the Akan people primarily located in Ghana's Western Region and parts of Côte d'Ivoire. He is a Christian.
