= Michael Achagwe Luguje =

Ghanaian public servant

- Born: 28 November 1973 (age 52)
- Citizenship: Ghanaian
- Education: World Maritime University, Paris Graduate School of Management, University of Ghana.

Michael Achagwe Luguje is a Ghanaian public servant and the former Director General of Ghana Ports and Harbours Authority. He has worked with Ghana Ports and Harbours Authority for a decade right from being a National Service Personnel to one of the highest ranks in the Ports Authority of Ghana.

== Early life and education ==
Michael Luguje was born on 28 November 1973 at Pong in Tamale but hails from Navrongo, in the Upper East Region of Ghana. He grew up in Kogni, a community in Tamale Metropolitan District in the Northern Region of Ghana. He studied the General Arts program at Tamale Senior High School. Life was very tough for him in his early days. He became a home tutor teaching French to kids. After much work, he finally had enough money to start his studies at university. He holds a Bachelor of Arts degree in French and Linguistics from the University of Ghana, and a Master of Science degree in Maritime Affairs from the World Maritime University in Malmo, Sweden. He also holds an Executive Master of Business Administration in Project and Strategic Management from the Paris Graduate School of Management, France.

== Career ==
Luguje joined the Ghana Ports and Harbours Authority in 1998 as a National Service Personnel. He gained employment at the organisation in 1999, and five years later, he became the special assistant to the then-Director General of the Ghana Ports and Harbours Authority. He joined the International Maritime Organisation (IMO) in 2007, working as the Regional Coordinator for Western and Central Africa, and in 2012, he was made the Secretary General for Port Management Association of West and Central Africa (PMAWCA). While working with PMAWCA, he doubled as the Executive Secretary of the Pan African Association of Port Cooperation (PAPC). He served in that capacity from 2012 until 2017. In June 2018 he was appointed Acting Director General of the Ghana Ports and Harbours Authority, and a month later, he was made substantive Director General of the organisation. He succeeded Paul Ansah.

== Personal life ==
Luguje is fluent in the English and French languages.

== See also ==
- List of Akufo-Addo government ministers and political appointees
- Ghana Ports and Harbours Authority
