= Andrew Egyapa Mercer =

Ghanaian politician and lawyer

Hon. Andrew Kofi Egyapa Mercer
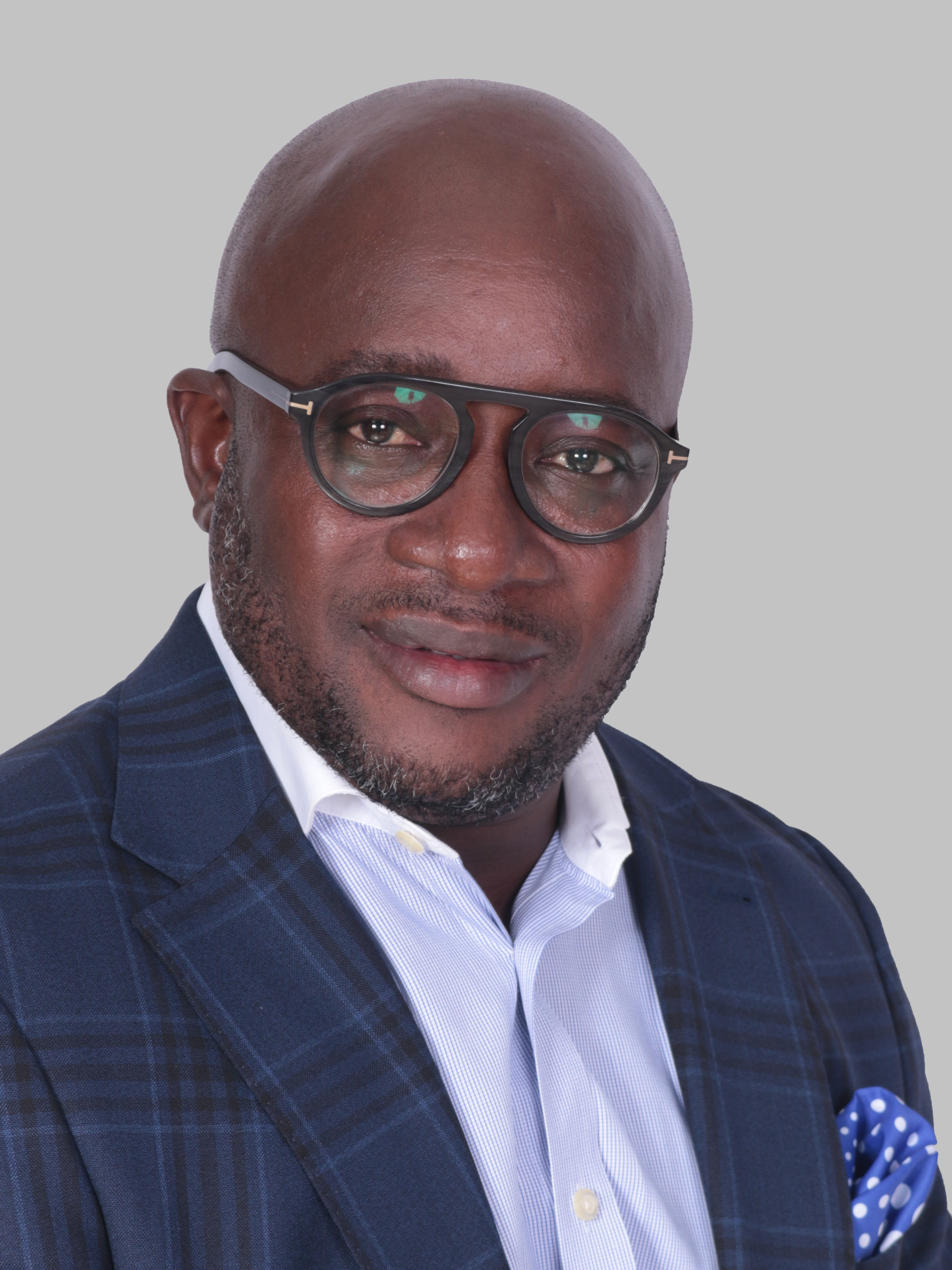

Member of Ghana Parliament for Sekondi constituency
- Incumbent
- Assumed office 7 January 2017
- President: Nana Akuffo-Addo
- Preceded by: Papa Owusu-Ankomah

Personal details
- Born: Andrew Kofi Egyapa Mercer; 25 May 1973 (age 53) Ghana
- Party: New Patriotic Party
- Education: Adisadel College, University of Ghana, Ghana School of Law
- Occupation: Politician
- Profession: Lawyer

Andrew Kofi Egyapa Mercer (born 25 May 1973) is a Ghanaian lawyer and politician. He is member of the New Patriotic Party. He is the immediate past Member of Parliament for the Sekondi Constituency in the Western Region of Ghana. He succeeded Papa Owusu-Ankomah, who had been MP for 20 years.

== Early life and education ==
Andrew Kofi Egyapa Mercer was born in Sekondi in the Western Region of Ghana to James Mercer, a Ghanaian lawyer and diplomat. He attended Chapel Hill Preparatory School in Takoradi for his primary education. He proceeded to the Adisadel College in Cape Coast, where he obtained both his GCE Ordinary level and GCE Advanced level certificates. He gained entrance into the University of Ghana, graduating with Honours in Bachelor of Arts in Humanities and Bachelor of Laws. He studied at the Ghana School of Law and qualified as a lawyer in Ghana after passing his bar examination.

== Professional career ==
Egyapa Mercer commenced his working life as a pupil with Messrs. Acquah-Sampon and Associates, a firm of solicitors based in Accra in 2004. He joined First Atlantic Bank in Accra in 2007 as an assistant manager and advanced to become the head of the legal department. Whilst at First Atlantic, he contested and lost the 2011 Parliamentary primaries of the New Patriotic Party in Sekondi to the incumbent Papa Owusu-Ankomah. He resigned in 2013 to set up Messrs. Mercer and Company, a corporate and investment law firm based in Accra.

== Political life ==
Egyapa Mercer first entered into party politics in 2011 when he contested the Sekondi Constituency NPP parliamentary primary. He contested against two other aspirants: the then incumbent MP, Owusu Ankomah, and Kweku Sam Amoah. He lost the primary to Owusu-Ankomah. He decided to contest the 2016 parliamentary election again on the ticket of the New Patriotic Party. This was after then-incumbent Member of Parliament Owusu-Ankomah had decided against contesting the seat he had won on five successive occasions. Egyapa Mercer filed his forms for the primary elections in May 2015 and contested unopposed in the 2015 primaries. He is a christian.

=== Parliamentary election ===
Egyapa Mercer launched his campaign on 14 August 2016 in Sekondi. During the launch, various speakers, including Alan John Kyerematen, advised the constituents to vote for Egyapa Mercer and Nana Akuffo-Addo as their parliamentarian and president respectively. Prior to the December 2016 elections, several activities were organized to showcase the various candidates to the constituents. One of these was the constituency debate for the various candidates of the political parties at the Sekondi Methodist Park. Egyapa Mercer won the parliamentary election by defeating Emmanuel Assifuah of the National Democratic Congress, Daniel Essuman of the Progressive People's Party, and Peter Arthur of the Convention People's Party. Egyapa Mercer polled 16,839 votes, representing 59.47% of the total valid votes.

=== Parliamentarian ===
As a Member of Parliament, Egyapa Mercer engaged actively with his constituents and fulfilled promises he had made on the campaign trail. Some of his engagements included the donation of five desktop computers and accessories costing US$4,000 to the Sekondi Library. This was to improve teaching and learning in the constituency. He also helped repay the debt owed the Ghana Football Association by Sekondi Eleven Wise, a Division 1 league club based in the constituency, with a contribution of GH₵5,000; other supporters paid the remaining GH₵1,300 toward officiating fees.
