= Papa Owusu-Ankomah =

Ghanaian lawyer and diplomat (born 1958)

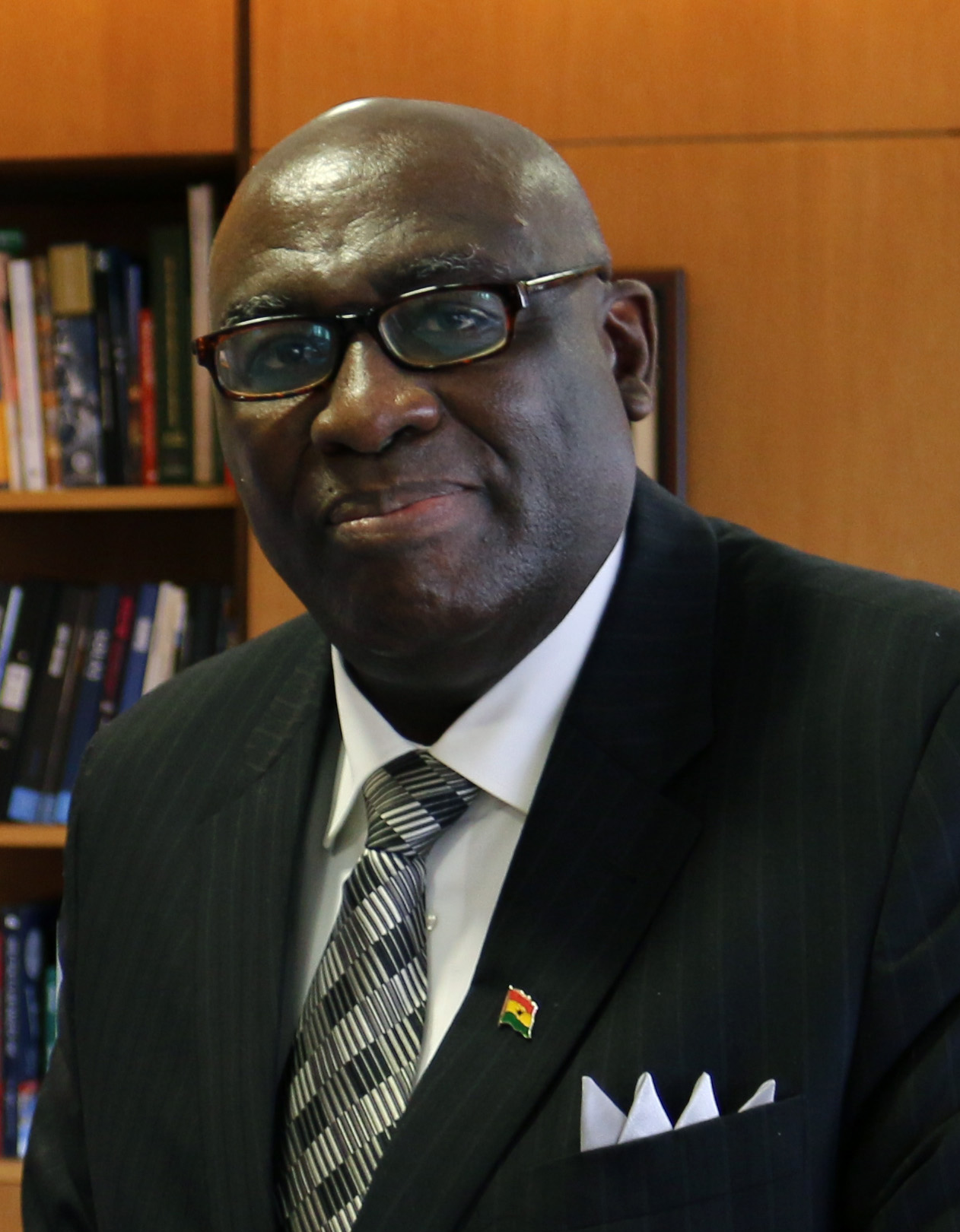
- Owusu-Ankomah in 2017

(Ghana) Member of Parliament
- In office January 1997 – January 2017
- Preceded by: Albert Bosomtwi-Sam
- Succeeded by: Egyapa Mercer
- Constituency: Sekondi

Deputy Majority Leader and Deputy Minister for Government Business
- In office 10 January 2001 – 30 July 2001

Minister for Youth and Sports
- In office August 2001 – September 2001

Majority Leader and Minister for Parliamentary Affairs
- In office October 2001 – March 2003

17th Attorney-General and Minister for Justice
- In office April 2003 – 3 February 2005
- President: John Kufour
- Preceded by: Nana Akufo-Addo
- Succeeded by: Ayikoi Otoo

Minister for Interior
- In office 11 January 2005 – 27 April 2006

Minister for Education, Science and Sports
- In office 5 February 2006 – 2008

Minister of Trade and Industry
- In office June 2008 – 6 January 2009

Personal details
- Born: 27 April 1958 (age 68) (Ghana) Sekondi, Western Region
- Party: New Patriotic Party
- Spouse: Augustina Owusu-Ankomah
- Children: 3
- Education: Mfantsipim School; University of Ghana; Ghana School of Law
- Occupation: Barrister
- Website: www.papaowusuankomah.com

Papa Owusu-Ankomah (born 27 April 1958) is a Ghanaian lawyer and politician. He is a member of the New Patriotic Party. He served as Member of Parliament for the Sekondi constituency from 1996 to 2016. In June 2017 Papa Owusu-Ankomah was appointed Ghana's High Commissioner to the UK and Ireland. His tour of duty ended on 30 November 2020 but was re-appointed to the same position in 2021 and is High Commissioner to date. He met the Queen Elizabeth II when he was presenting his Letters of Credence at the Buckingham Palace in London.

== Early life ==
Owusu-Ankomah was born in Sekondi-Takoradi, Ghana, on 27 April 1958, into a family of entrepreneurs in the retail and real estate industries in the Western Region. His father, Yaw Owusu-Ankomah, hailed from Atibie in the Kwahu District of the Eastern Region, while his mother, Araba Owomoye Owusu-Ankomah, hails from Dixcove in the Western Region.

== Education ==
Owusu-Ankomah begun his education in primary schools in Takoradi, going on for his secondary education to Mfantsipim School, where he obtained the West African Examination Council's Advanced-Level Examination certificate for entrance into university.

At the University of Ghana, Legon, he studied law for his bachelor's degree. He graduated with an LL.B (Hons) 2nd Class Upper Division in 1979 proceeded to the Ghana School of Law, where he completed his professional studies in the Law in 1981. He was called to the Ghana Bar that same year.

== Professional career ==
Owusu-Ankomah served as the Attorney General of Ghana from 2003 to 2005. Prior to entering politics, he was the managing partner in the practice of Owusu-Ankomah, Amanquah & Co.

== Party activism ==
Owusu-Ankomah was a founding member, and once served as the chairman, of the Western Regional branch of the New Patriotic Party (NPP), he was also a founding member of the Danquah-Busia Club and a member of the Western Regional Campaign team in 1992 and 1996. He was a member of the Publicity Committee of the Camp Board of the NPP for the 2000 elections, and from October 2001 to March 2003 he was the Chairman of the Communications Committee and a member of the National Steering Committee – which came up with the "Positive Change" slogan. He has been a member of the National Executive Committee of the NPP and a member of the National Council of the NPP since 1997. In 2006, he was a member of the National Campaign Board of the party.

Owusu-Ankomah polled 28,802 votes out of the 44,507 valid votes cast, which represented 53.80% more than his opponents Albert Bosomtwi-Sam, an NDC member who polled 14,990 votes, and Anthony Ackah, a PNC member who polled 715 votes during the 1996 Ghanaian General Elections.

In the 2000 Elections, he polled 28,434, representing 67.60% more than his opponents Anthony Richard Cudjoe, an NDC member who polled 11,661 votes representing 27.70%, Charles Van Dyck, a CPP member who polled 1,223 votes representing 2.90%, and Abu Seidu, a PNC member who polled 759 votes representing 1.80%.

He won the 2004 General election with 17,433 votes out of the 26,307 valid votes cast, representing 66.30% over his opponents Betty Busumtwi-Dam, an NDC member who polled 8,086 votes, Omar Ahmed Bekure a PNC member who polled 444 votes, and Joe Victor Eghan a CPP member who polled 344 votes.

He won again in 2008 with 13,005 votes out of the valid votes cast representing 55.41% over his opponents Betty Busumtwi-Sam who polled 9,578, Mrs Hildergard Krakue who polled 727 votes, Frederick Akor Larbi who polled 88 votes, and Oliver Peter Vanderpuye-Orgle who polled 72 votes.

Owusu-Ankomah has been a member of the Western Region NPP since its inception; he worked with founding members of the party, including the late Mr. Stephen Krakue, to form a political party to contest the National Democratic Congress. In 1996, Owusu-Ankomah won the Sekondi constituency seat on the ticket of the NPP and while he was in the opposition, he served as the shadow minister for Information.

== Parliamentary career ==
When the New Patriotic Party won the 2000 Ghanaian General Election, Owusu-Ankomah was appointed Deputy Majority leader and later elected Majority leader in parliament.

While in parliament, he served on a number of committees, among them the Standing Committee on Subsidiary Legislation, the Select Committee on Foreign Affairs, Finance Committee and the Committee on Constitutional, Legal and Parliamentary Affairs.

== Government experience ==
Within the executive branch of Government, Owusu-Ankomah has led a combination of staff at the Ministry of Justice, Youth and Sports, Parliamentary Affairs, Interior; Education, Science and Sports, and the Ministry of Trade, Industry, Private Sector Development and Presidential Special Initiatives. During his tenure of office as the Minister of Education, Science and Sports, the Ghana Black Stars made their historic run to the round of sixteen at the World Cup in 2006. He was also responsible for the reformation of basic education in Ghana. He resigned in 2007 to contest the flagbarership of his party the New Patriotic Party. His bid was unsuccessful having placed sixth ahead of other party contenders. He was appointed Minister for Trade industry, Private Sector Development and Presidential Special Initiatives by the then president, John Agyekum Kufour. Owusu-Ankomah served as the MP for Sekondi for more than twenty years.

== Personal life ==
Owusu-Ankomah is married to Augustina Owusu-Ankomah and the couple have three adult children who are all lawyers.

Owusu-Ankomah tested positive for COVID-19 on 10 April 2020 and was taken to the Intensive Care Unit of the Royal Free Hospital in London. He later recovered.
