= The Meridian Rock =

Monument in Ghana

The Meridian Rock was a monument marking the point where the Greenwich Meridian crosses the Equator. The rock was set at Tema Harbour, Ghana, on the platform of Meridian Port Services Limited (MPS).

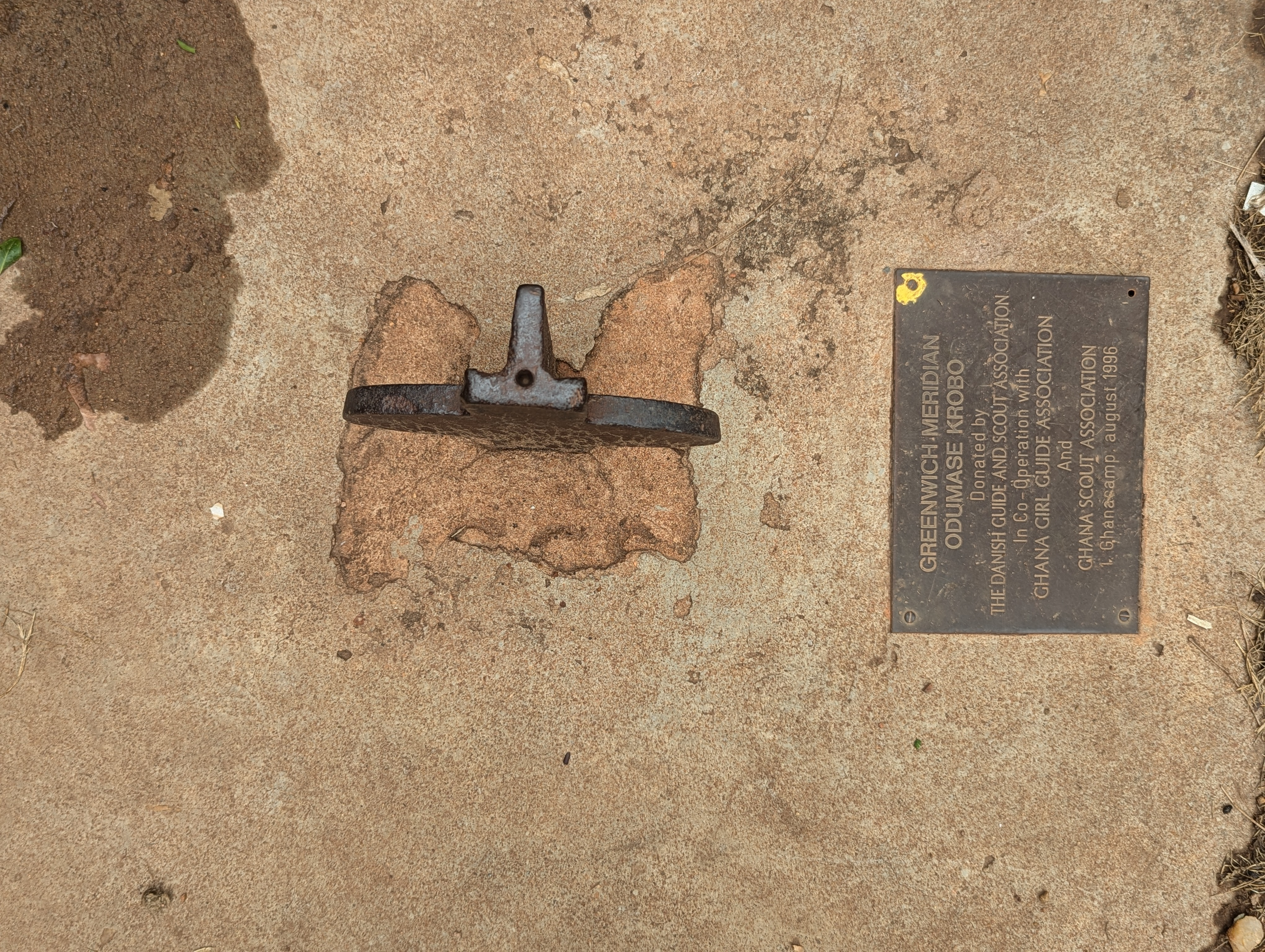
Greenwich Meridian Point at Krobo Odumase, Ghana

== History ==
The prime Meridian Line (0°00’00.00”E/W) passes through the center of Meridian Port Services Container Terminal, the line first enters MPS from the northern boundary (5°37’35.15”N) to the beach side (5°37’29.75”N) which is the closest land-based place to the point where the Greenwich Meridian Line (zero degrees longitude) crosses with the Equator (zero degrees latitude).

A rock in the sea nearby, off Halcrow Beach, also called the Meridian Rock, was believed to mark the crossing of the Meridian Line and the Equator.

On 21 March 2014 the monument, a giant rock, erected by The Board of Directors, Management and Workers of Meridian Port Services Limited, was unveiled by President John Dramani Mahama.

The monument was not very successful as a tourist attraction and was removed as the harbour expanded. In 2021 it was proposed to build a church instead, to mark the Prime Meridian.
