= Thomas Nyarko Ampem =

Ghanaian politician

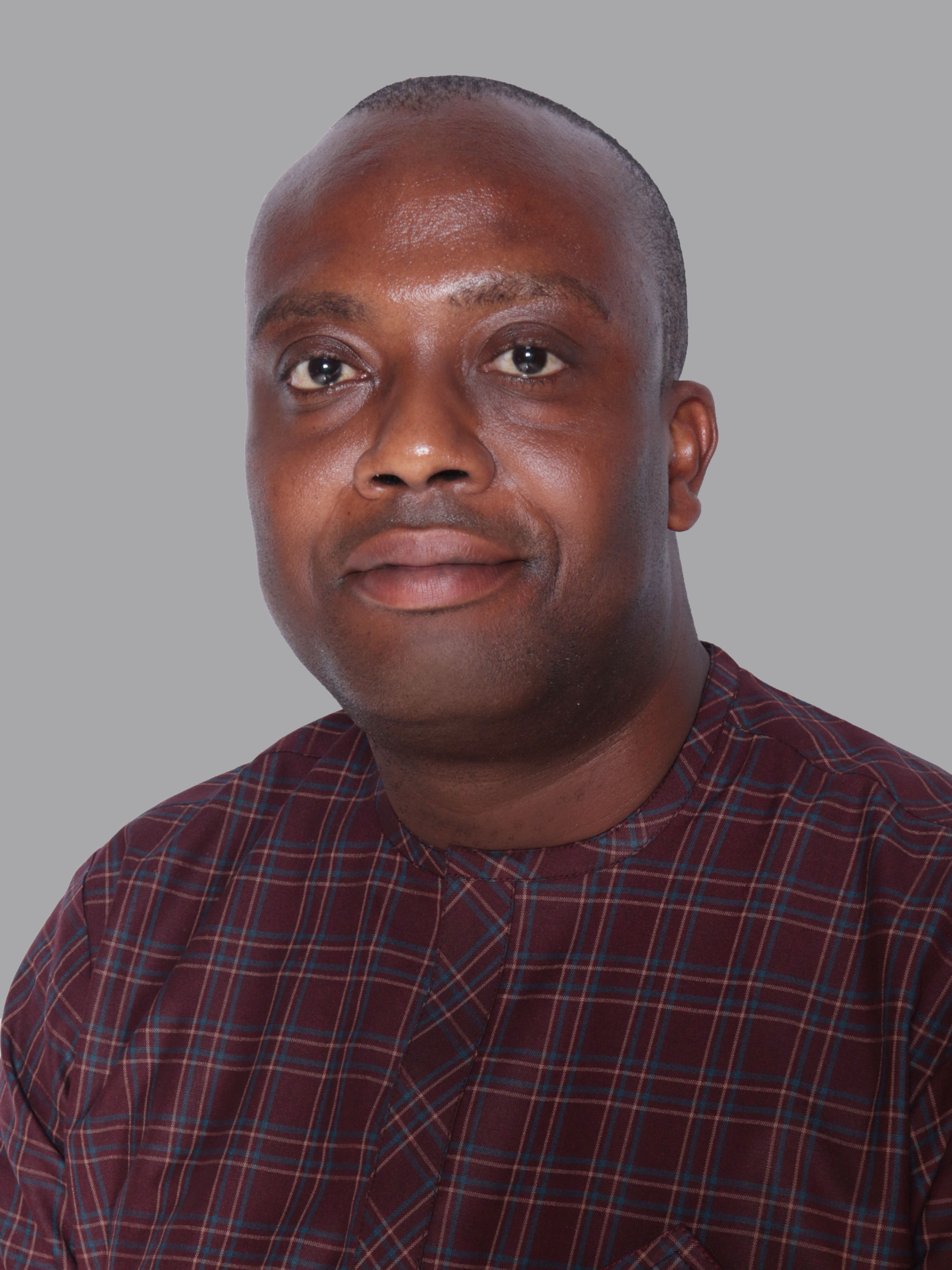

Member of Parliament for Asuogyaman Constituency
- Incumbent
- Assumed office 7 January 2017

Deputy Minister of Ministry of Finance and Economic Planning (Ghana)
- Incumbent
- Assumed office March 2025

Personal details
- Born: 14 February 1978 (age 48) Anum-Ghana
- Party: National Democratic Congress
- Education: Kwame Nkrumah University of Science and Technology; Virginia Commonwealth University; Peki College of Education
- Occupation: Teacher

Thomas Nyarko Ampem is a Ghanaian teacher, politician and member of parliament of the Seventh Parliament of the Fourth Republic of Ghana, Eighth Parliament of the Fourth Republic of Ghana and the Ninth Parliament of the Fourth Republic of Ghana representing the Asuogyaman (Ghana parliament constituency) in the Eastern Region on the ticket of the National Democratic Congress (NDC).

== Early life and education ==
Ampem was born on 14 February 1978 and hails from Anum in the Eastern Region of Ghana. He obtained an MSc in Finance in 2010 from Virginia Commonwealth University in the United States. Prior to getting the Masters, he had a Bachelor of Arts degree in Economics and Geography from the Kwame Nkrumah University of Science and Technology (KNUST).

In 1998, Ampem attained a 3-Year Teacher’s Certificate at Peki Training College and became a subject teacher at the Akosombo VRA Junior Secondary School No.1 from 1998 to 2001 and subsequently a substitute teacher at the Fairfax County Public Schools, Virginia, United States from 2006 to 2008. He attained his Secondary School education at Anum Presbyterian Secondary school from 1992 to 1994.

== Career ==
Ampem is a Ghanaian Legislator and currently a Member of Parliament for Asuogyaman Constituency. He represents the interest and concerns of his constituents in Parliament and supports in proposing, debating and voting on new laws. He served as a Chairman of the Budget Committee in Parliament in the Eighth Parliament of the Fourth Republic that oversaw and scrutinized government spending. He also was a member of the Finance Committee from 2020 to 2024. In February 2025, Ghanaian president John Mahama nominated Ampem as Deputy Minister of Finance.

Between September 2013 to January 2017, he served as the District Chief Executive of Asuogyaman with his duties being the representative of the President of the District and Chairman of the District Security Council and Executive Committee. He was responsible for overseeing the day-to-day performance of the executive and administrative functions of the Assembly.

From April 2012 to September 2013, Ampem worked as a Director of Finance for the Inter-Ministerial Coordinating Committee (IMCC) on Decentralisation Secretariat of the Office of the President. He administered and monitored the financial system of the Committee to ensure that the Secretariat’s finances were maintained in an accurate and timely manner. He also oversaw the management and coordination of all fiscal reporting activities within the Secretariat, including revenues and expenses and monitored the banking activities. He administered employees’ files and records to ensure the payment of payroll, allowances, and benefits in an accurate and timely manner. He was instrumental in developing and maintaining systems of internal controls to safeguard the financial assets of the Secretariat.

Between January 2012 to September 2013, Ampem worked as a part time Lecturer at the Accra Institute of Technology and Concord Business College where he lectured students in courses in Finance and Business management and additionally, offering support and counselling to his students.

== Politics ==
Ampem is a member of the National Democratic Congress (NDC). He has been the NDC Member of Parliament for Asuogyaman Constituency since January 2017.

In March 2025, he was sworn in by John Mahama as the Deputy Minister of Finance and economic planning.
