= Asuogyaman (Ghana parliament constituency) =

Constituency in the Eastern Region of Ghana

- constituency for the Parliament of Ghana
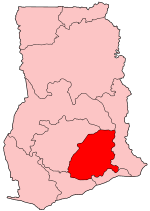
- District: Asuogyaman District
- Region: Eastern Region of Ghana

Current constituency
- Party: National Democratic Congress (NDC)
- MP: Thomas Nyarko Ampem

Thomas Nyarko Ampem is the member of parliament for the constituency. He was elected on the ticket of the National Democratic Congress (NDC) and won a majority of 1,135 votes to become the MP. He succeeded Kofi Osei Ameyaw who had represented the constituency in the 6th Republic parliament on the ticket of the New Patriotic Party (NPP).

== Members of Parliament ==
| Name | Party | Parliament |
|---|---|---|
| Kwamena Dwamena-aboagye | NDC | 2nd |
| Dwamena Bekoe | NDC | 3rd |
| Kofi Osei-ameyaw | NPP | 4th |
| Joses Asare-akoto | NDC | 5th |
| Kofi Osei-ameyaw | NPP | 6th |
| Thomas Ampem Nyarko | NDC | 7th |
| Thomas Ampem Nyarko | NDC | 8th |

== See also ==
- List of Ghana Parliament constituencies
