= Ghana Ports and Harbours Authority =

Government agency of Ghana

Location
- Country: Republic of Ghana

Details
- Ag. Director General: Brigadier-General Paul Seidu Tanye-Kulono
- Ag. Director of Port, Tema: Tebon Zumah
- Ag. Director of Port, Takoradi: Capt. James R. Quayson

Statistics
- Annual cargo tonnage: 13,000,000 metric revenue tons (FY2010)
- Annual container volume: 1,000,000 twenty-foot equivalent units (TEU) (FY2011)
- Passenger traffic: 900,000 passengers (FY 2011)
- Website www.ghanaports.gov.gh

The Ghana Ports and Harbours Authority (GPHA) is the national port authority of Ghana. Between the 16th and 18th centuries foreign trade in the then Gold Coast was undertaken from about 40 landing points scattered around the Gold Coast. By the 1900s these had converged to six main ports of trade. From 1920 to the 1940s the transport witnessed its first revolution in the road and rail network which culminated in the construction of the Takoradi Port. Further road expansion and shifts in the direction of trade in the post independence era led to the construction of the Ghana's second port Tema Port, and Port of Tema, and the Fishing Harbour at Tema. GPHA main offices are in Tema, and Sekondi-Takoradi. GPHA is a member of the International Association of Ports and Harbours (IAPH).

== Ports and Harbours ==
The Takoradi Harbour and Tema Harbour and ports serves Sekondi-Takoradi and Tema's role as manufacturing centers, and handles cargo in transshipment to and from bordering countries north of Ghana. The Golden Jubilee Terminal is a recently opened facility of the Tema port.

== Fishing Harbour at Tema ==
The Fishing Harbour at Tema is a separate port facility at Tema. It is a commercial and industrial fishing port composed of four main areas, Inner Harbour, Outer Harbour, Canoe Basin and Commercial Area. The harbour handles the catch from commercial deep-sea fishing and canoe fishing.

== Training and Workshop ==
=== 2024 ===
In September 2024, Ghana's maritime sector worked to improve port security using the International Ship and Port Facility Security (ISPS) Code. The Ghana Maritime Authority (GMA) and the UK Department for Transport organized a workshop for maritime inspectors to improve security practices.

Participants, including officials from the GMA, Regional Maritime University, and Ghana Ports and Harbours Authority (GPHA), visited Tema Port to see how security measures were being applied. Jim Hamilton from the UK Department for Transport praised the progress in security since his last visit.

Colonel Benjamin Boamah, the Port Security Manager, emphasized the importance of strict monitoring to keep the port safe. Harbour Master Capt. Bramwell Tawiah talked about ongoing training and working with international partners to improve port security.

== Lawsuit and Legal Issues ==
=== GCNet ===
In November 2024, an arbitration tribunal in London ruled in favor of the Government of Ghana in a case involving Ghana Community Network Services Limited (GCNet). The dispute stemmed from the government’s termination of a contract with GCNet in 2020 for managing customs systems at Ghanaian ports. The tribunal dismissed GCNet’s claims and awarded Ghana $2.19 million to cover legal fees. It also upheld that the termination of the contract was lawful and limited GCNet’s compensation to $5.4 million, as stated in the agreement.

== See also ==
- Takoradi Harbour
- Tema Harbour
- Transport in Ghana
- Harbor
- Port authority
- Port operator
