= List of senior high schools in the Ashanti Region =

List of schools

There are more than 80 Senior Secondary schools in Ashanti. Some are; osei Tutu senior high school, prempeh college, opoku Ware school, Kuhis

School	Type	Location(s)
Bosome Freho District		
Bosome Senior High Technical School	Public School	Asiwa
Adansi North District and Adansi South District
Secondary	Technical school	Akrofuom
Asare Bediako Secondary	Public school	Akrokerri
Bogwesango Secondary	Public school	Bodwesango
Dompoase	Public school	Dompoase
New Edubiase Secondary	Public school	New Edubiase
T.I. Ahmadiyya Senior High School	Public school	Fomena
Senior High schools in Obuasi Municipal District
Adansi Technical Institute	Private school & Technical school	Obuasi
Artic Senior High School	Private School	Obuasi
Christ the King Catholic Senior High School	Catholic school	Obuasi
Father Augustine Murphy Commercial School	Commercial school	Obuasi
Just Love Senior High School	Private school	Obuasi
Obuasi Secondary	Technical school	Obuasi
St. Margaret Senior High School	Private school	Obuasi
Senior High schools in Afigya-Sekyere District
Adu Gyamfi Secondary	Public school	Jamasi
Agona Secondary	Technical school	Agona
Konadu Yiadom Secondary	Public school	Asaman
Kumasi secondary technical school	Public school	Agona
Okomfo Anokye Secondary	Public school	Wiamoase
Osei Tutu II College (Great Osec- PE NOKORE NO)	Public school	Tetrem, Afigya-Sekyere District
Senior High schools in Ahafo Ano North District and Ahafo Ano South District
Ahafo Ano North District		
Maabang Secondary	Technical school	Maabang
Tepa Secondary	Public school	Tepa
Ahafo Ano South District		
Mankranso Secondary	Public school	Mankranso
Senior High schools in Amansie East District and Amansie West District		
Amansie East District		
Jacobu Secondary	Technical school	Jacobu
Oppong Memorial Secondary	Public school	Kokofu
Saint Joseph Secondary	Technical school	Ahwiren
SDA Secondary	Public school	Bekwai
Wesley High School	Public school	Bekwai
Amansie Senior High Technical School	Private school	Bekwai
College of Accountancy	Private school	Bekwai
Amansie West District		
Danyaseman Catholic Senior High School	Catholic school	Poano, Amansie West District
Esase Bontefufuo Secondary	Public school	Esase Bontefufuo
Manso-Adubia Secondary	Public school	Adubia
Mansoman Secondary	Public school	Manso Atwere
Senior High schools in Asante Akim North District and Asante Akim South District		
Asante Akim North District		
Agogo Collins Senior High School	Public school	Agogo
Agogo State College	Public school	Agogo
Konongo Odumase Senior High School	Public school	Odumase
Owerriman Secondary	Public school	Domeabra
Asante Akim South District		
Bompata Presby Secondary	Public school	Bompata
Juaso Senior High Technical School	Technical school	Juaso
Jubile senior High school	Public school	Dampong, Asante Akim South District
Ofoase Senior High Technical School	Public school, Technical school	Ofoase, Asante Akim South District
Senior High schools in Atwima Mponua District and Atwima Nwabiagya District		
Mpasatia Secondary	Technical school	Mpasatia
Nkawie Senior High Technical School	Technical school	Nkawie
Nyinahin Catholic Secondary	Catholic school	Nyinahin
Osei Tutu Secondary	Public school	Akropong
Toase Secondary	Public school	Toase
Senior High schools in Botsomtwe/Atwima/Kwanhuma District		
Afia Kobi Ampem Girls Secondary	Public school & Girls school	Trabuom
Beposo Secondary	Public school	Beposo
Ejuraman Secondary	Public school	Ejura
Jachie Pramso Senior High School	Public school	Jachie Pramso, Botsomtwe/Atwima/Kwanhuma District
St. Margaret High School	Public school	Feyiase, Botsomtwe/Atwima/Kwanhuma District
Sekyedumase Secondary	Public school	Seko, Botsomtwe/Atwima/Kwanhuma District
Senior High schools in Kumasi Metropolitan District		
Adventist Senior High School (Atitire)	Public school	Bantama-Kumasi, Kumasi
Angel Educational Complex - Kronom	Commercial school	Kronom, Kumasi
Anglican Senior High School	Public school	Asem-Kumasi
Asanteman Secondary School (The Royals, NANANOM)	Public school	Bantama
Ashanti Kingdom Senior High School	Public school	Ahodwo Daban-Kumasi, Kumasi
Ghana Armed Forces Senior High School	Commercial School	Bantama-Kumasi, Kumasi
Ideal college	Public school	Boadi
KNUST Senior High School	Public school	Kumasi
Kumasi Academy	Public school	Asokore Mampong
Kumasi Girls Secondary School	Public school & Girls school	Abrepo-Kumasi, Kumasi
Kumasi High School	Public school	Atonsu Gyenase, Kumasi
Kumasi Senior High Technical school (Animuonyamfo)	Technical school	Patasi-Kumasi
Mmofraturo Girls Secondary School	Public school & Girls school	Kumasi
Opoku Ware School	Public school	Kumasi
Osei Kyeretwie Secondary School	Public school	Old Tafo
Pentecost Secondary School	Public school	Breman-kumasi, Kumasi
Prempeh College	Public school	Kumasi
Roman Girls Nursing Training School	Nursing school & Girls school	Suame-Kumasi, Kumasi
Serwaa Nyarko Senior High School	Public school	New Tafo, Kumasi
St. Louis Secondary School	Public school	Oduom
T.I. Ahmadiyya Senior High School	Public school	Kumasi
Senior High Schools in Kwabre District		
Adanwomase Secondary	Public school	Adanwomase
Aduman Secondary	Public school	Aduman
Antoa Secondary	Public school	Antoa
Gyaama Pensan Senior High Technical School	Technical school	Aboaso
Kofi Adjei Secondary	Technical school	Bampanase
Simms Secondary	Technical school	Fawoade
Senior High Schools in Offinso District		
Akumadan Secondary	Public school	Akumadan
Dwamena Akenten Secondary	Public school	Newtown, Offinso District
Namong Secondary	Public school	Namong
St. Jerome Secondary	Public school	Abofour
Senior High Schools in Sekyere Kumawu District		
Bankoman Senior High School	Public school	Banko
Dadease Agriculture Secondary	Commercial school	Dadease
Senior High Schools in Sekyere East District and Sekyere West District		
Sekyere East District		
Effiduase Secondary	Commercial school	Effiduase
Krobea Asante Vocational/Technical Institute	Commercial school & Technical school	Asokore
T.I. Ahmadiyya Girls Senior High School	Public school & Girls school	Asokore
Tweneboa Kodua Secondary School	Commercial school & Technical school	Kumawu
Sekyere West District		
Amaniampong Secondary	Public school	Mampong
Nsutaman Catholic Secondary	Catholic school	Nsuta
Saint Joseph Secondary	Commercial School	Mampong
St. Monica's Secondary	Public school	Mampong
Senior High Schools in Ejisu-Juaben Municipal District		
Achinakrom Secondary School	Public school	Achinakrom, Ejisu
Bonwire Secondary Technical School	Technical school	Bonwire
Church of Christ Senior High School	Public school	Adadeentem
Ejisuman Secondary School	Public school	Ejisu
Ejisu Senior High Technical School	Technical school	Ejisu
Juaben Secondary School	Public school	Juaben

== See also ==
- Education in Ghana
- List of Senior High Schools in Ghana
