= Grace Coleman =

Ghanaian politician

Member of the Ghana Parliament for Effiduase Asokore
- In office 7 January 1997 – 6 January 2009
- Preceded by: Samuel Adjei Asirifi
- Succeeded by: Frank Boakye Agyen

Personal details
- Born: 29 April 1943 Effiduase, Ashanti Region Gold Coast (now Ghana)
- Died: 27 August 2009 (aged 66)
- Party: New Patriotic Party
- Education: University of Ghana
- Occupation: Politician
- Profession: Banker

Grace Coleman (29 April 1943 – 27 August 2009) was a Ghanaian politician and a member of Parliament for the Effiduase Asokore Constituency representing the Fourth Parliament of the Fourth Republic of Ghana.

== Early life and education ==
Coleman was born at Effiduase in the Ashanti Region of Ghana. She attended Wesley Girls High School from 1962, she obtained her Ordinary and Advanced Level certificates and continued her education at the University of Ghana, Legon, where she studied Economics and obtained a Bachelor's degree. Coleman earned her master's degree at Vanderbilt University in the United States of America in 1979, and also achieved a certificate in Leadership and Development at Harvard University in 1998.

== Career ==
From 1968 to 1974, Coleman worked with the Ghana Commercial Bank (GCB), Ejisu branch in Kumasi, where she rose to become the branch manager, and between 1975 and 1980, she was a Senior Economic Officer at the Ministry of Finance and Economic Planning.

She was Ghana's Ambassador to the Netherlands from 1980 to 1982 during the Limann administration. She became a teacher, from 1983 to 1991, and became a senior lecturer at the Institute for Training in Intercultural Management in Holland.

Coleman was a Deputy Minister of Finance and Economic Planning in the first term of the Kufuor administration.

== Politics ==
Coleman was first elected to parliament during the December 1996 Ghanaian General Elections on the Ticket of the New Patriotic Party for the Effiduase Asokore Constituency in the Ashanti Region of Ghana She polled 13,154 votes out of the 19,077 valid votes cast representing 54.90%. She maintained her seat in the 2000 Elections In the year 2000, Coleman won the general election as the member of parliament for the Effiduase Asokore constituency of the Ashanti Region. She won on the ticket of the New Patriotic Party. Her constituency was a part of the 31 parliamentary seats out of 33 seats won by the New Patriotic Party in that election for the Ashanti Region. The New Patriotic Party won a majority total of 99 parliamentary seats out of 200 seats. She was elected with 13,954 votes out of 19,799 total valid votes cast. This was equivalent to 71.2% of the total valid votes cast. She was elected over Kwasi Amakye-Boateng of the National Democratic Congress, Osei Kwabena of the Convention People's Party, Osei Addiya of the National Reformed Party, Lovia Yeboah of the People's National Convention and Alfred O. Baah of the United Ghana Movement. These won 4,408, 729, 246, 235 and 35 votes out of the total valid votes cast respectively. These were equivalent to 22.5%, 3.7%, 1.3%, 1.2% and 0.2% respectively of total valid votes cast.

She maintained her seat in 2004 after she polled 13,051 votes out of the 23,524 valid votes cast, representing 55.50%.

== Personal life ==
Coleman was married to David Coleman and had four children. She died on 27 August 2009 of stress-related illness including diabetes.
