= Datano =

- Town
- Location within Ghana
- Coordinates: 6°17′0″N 1°58′0″W
- Country: Ghana
- Region: Ashanti Region
- District: Amansie South District
- Time zone: GMT
  - Summer (DST): GMT

Datano is a town located in the Amansie South District in the Ashanti Region of Ghana. It shares a boundary with Tontokrom and is known for the Manso-Datano United Friends Association. In 2017, a GHȼ350,000.00 air-conditioned washroom facility was awarded to improve sanitation in the town. Datano is an industrial town and the most populous in the Amansie South District.
