= T.I. Ahmadiyya Girls Senior High School, Asokore =

Girls' second-cycle institution in Ghana

T.I. Ahmadiyya Girls Senior High School

Location
- P.O. Box 20; Asokore; Ashanti Region; Ghana; 6°51′08″N 1°23′05″W

Information
- Type: Public high school
- Religious affiliation: Islam
- Denomination: Ahmadiyya Muslim Mission, Ghana
- Established: 1968 (58 years ago)
- Status: Active
- School district: Sekyere East District
- Authority: Ghana Education Service
- Oversight: Ministry of Education
- Headmistress: Hajia Ayesha N. Boakye
- Gender: Female
- Age: 14 to 18
- Classes offered: General Arts, Home Economics, General Science, Visual Arts, Business
- Nickname: AMGISS
- Affiliation: Ahmadiyya, Ghana
- Website: www.tiamassgirls.edu.gh

T.I. Ahmadiyya Girls' Senior High School (Amass Girls) is a girls' second-cycle institution in Asokore in the Sekyere East District of Ashanti Region, Ghana.

== History ==
The school was established by the Ahmadiyya Muslim Mission, Ghana, in 1968 as a middle school. The following year, the school was converted into a secondary school.

=== List of headmasters ===
Name	Designation	Tenure	Remark
Mr. Antwi Boasiako	Acting Headmaster	1968 - 1972	Ghanaian
Mr. Mubarak Ahmed	Headmaster	1972 - 1990	Expatriate
Mr. M. A. Morgan	Headmaster	1990 -	Ghanaian
Mr. Collins Yeboah-Druye	Headmaster	2009	Ghanaian
Madam Ayesha Nyantakyiwaa Boakye	Headmistress	2009 -	Ghanaian

In 1973, the school was registered by the Ghana Education Service.

== See also ==
- Education in Ghana
- List of senior high schools in the Ashanti Region
