= Oyoko =

Town in Ashanti Region, Ghana

- Town
- Location in Ghana
- Coordinates: 6°52′22″N 1°23′14″W
- Country: Ghana
- Region: Ashanti
- District: Sekyere East
- Time zone: GMT
  - Summer (DST): GMT

Oyoko is a small town in the Sekyere Kumawu District of the Ashanti Region of Ghana. The town is in the Kumawu parliamentary constituency. Oyoko is near Effiduase, about 40 kilometres (25 mi) northeast of Kumasi, the regional capital.

== Notable places ==
There are two notable places in the town. One is the Optical Technician Training Institute (OTTI), which is the only school in Ghana for the training of opticians. The other notable place is the Westphalian Children's Village orphanage. Its clinic specializes in treating various eye conditions.

== See also ==
- Eye care in Ghana
