= Barekese Senior High School =

Location
- Ashanti Region; Barekese; Ghana; 6.8510°N 1.7267°W

Information
- Type: Coeducational public high school
- Motto: Blazing the Trail
- Established: 11 October 2004 (22 years ago)
- Status: Active
- Headmaster: Emmanuel K. Asiedu
- Gender: Boys and girls
- Age: 14 to 18
- Nickname: Basec
- Alumni: ,

Barekese Senior High School (Basec) is a coeducational category C public high school in Barekese of the Atwima Nwabiagya North Municipal in the Ashanti Region of Ghana. Barekese is about 25 kilometres (16 miles) from the central part of Kumasi and can be found off the Offinso Road through Abrepo Junction.with a student population of over 3,000 students.

== History ==
Barekese Senior High School was established on the 11th October 2004 as a Community School and in 2006, it was subsequently absorbed by the Government as a co-educational institution with facilities for Boarding and Day students.

== School motto ==
The official motto of Barekese Senior High School is "Blazing the trail". and a slogan "Abammofo"

== Academic programs ==
The academic programs of Barekese Senior High School which functions within the standard three-year Senior High School (SHS) curriculum framework established by Ghana's National Council for Curriculum and Assessment (NaCCA) are six in number and are as follows;

- General Science
- General Arts
- Visual Arts
- Business
- Home Economics
- Agricultural Science

== Facilities ==
Barekese SHS has the following facilities;

- Science Labs
- ICT Lab
- Home Economics Practical rooms.

== Achievements ==
Notable achievements of Barekese SHS include;

- Participants, 2026 Street Art Festival by the Visual & Performing Arts Department of Barekese Senior High School at Asokwa Interchange.
- Round of 16, 2025 LUV FM High School Debate Competition.
- Three-time Ashanti Regional SRC Week literary group champions.
- 2nd runners-up, Independence Day inter-school choral music competition - 2010, 2011 and 2015 respectively.

== See also ==
- Education in Ghana
- List of senior high schools in Ashanti Region
