= Wuraso =

Community in Ashanti Region, Ghana

- Country: Ghana
- Region: Ashanti Region
- District: Sekyere Afram Plains District

Wuraso is a community near Kumawu in the Ashanti Region of Ghana.

== Institution ==
- Wuraso Police Station
