= Samuel Adjei Asirifi =

Ghanaian politician

Member of Parliament for Effiduasi-Asokore
- In office 7 January 1993 – 6 January 1997
- President: Jerry John Rawlings
- Preceded by: New
- Succeeded by: Grace Coleman

Personal details
- Born: 22 May 1948 (age 78) Ashanti Region, Gold Coast (now Ghana)
- Party: National Democratic Congress
- Occupation: Politician
- Profession: Self-employed

Samuel Adjei Asirifi (born 22 May 1948) is a Ghanaian politician and a member of the first Parliament of the fourth Republic representing the Effiduasi-Asokore Constituency in the Ashanti Region of Ghana.

== Early life and education ==
Asirifi was born on 22 May 1948 in the Ashanti Region of Ghana. He attended the S.D.A. Secondary School and obtained his GCE Ordinary Level certificate.

== Politics ==
Asirifi was elected into parliament on the ticket of the National Democratic Congress to represent the Effiduase-Asokore Constituency in the Ashanti Region of Ghana during the December 1992 Ghanaian parliamentary Election. He was succeeded by Grace Coleman of the New Patriotic Party who polled 13,154 votes out of the total valid votes cast representing 54.90% over her opponents Opoku-Mensah Kofi of the National Democratic Congress who polled 5,923 votes representing 24.70% and Bashiru M. Abdallah of the People's National Congress who also polled 0 vote representing 0%.

== Career ==
Asirifi is poultry farmers and a former member of Parliament for the Effiduase-Asokore Constituency in the Ashanti Region of Ghana.

== Personal life ==
Samuel is a Christian.
