= Krobea Asante Vocational/Technical Institute =

Public school in Ashanti Region, Ghana

Coordinates: 6°51′01″N 1°22′22″W

- Effiduase Asokore, Ashanti Region; Ghana

Information
- Type: TVET
- Established: 1999 (27 years ago)
- Grades: Forms [1-3]

Krobea Asante Technical and Vocational School is a second-cycle institution in Effiduase Asokore in the Sekyere East District in the Ashanti Region of Ghana. The school is located on the outskirt of Asokore off Ahensan Road. The school is run by the Technical and Vocational Education and Training (TVET) Service in Ghana. In 2015, the school won the Member of Parliament's Independence Cup and was also the second Best Technical Institute in the Ashanti Region.

== History ==
The school was established in 1999 by Nana Susubribi Krobea Asante, the Omanhene (Chief) of Asokore Traditional Area. It was commissioned by Janet Graham, the then Canadian High Commissioner to Ghana. In 2023, the headteacher of the school was Mr. K Baah. In 2023, the senior housemaster of the school was Agyen Emmanuel.

== Disturbances ==
On 22 January 2023, some students of the school vandalized the lighting system, dining hall, and food in the storeroom of the institution. They also destroyed school properties such as cars, bungalows, and notice boards of the school. The students accused the school authorities of being the reason their predecessors performed poorly in their examination results. The students also complained they were severely punished by teachers. The school was shut down indefinitely.

=== Aftermath ===
About 39 students of which 27 were juveniles were remanded by the Asokore Mampong District Court in the Ashanti Region and were charged with conspiracy to commit a crime to wit, unlawful entry, causing unlawful damage, and stealing. Simon Osei-Mensah who is the Chairman of the Ashanti Regional Security Council (REGSEC) said a 5-member committee was set up to probe the events leading to the protest.
