= Kwafokrom =

Kwafokrom may refer to the Ghanaian villages:

- Kwafokrom (Ashanti Region)
- Kwafokrom (Eastern Region)
