= Sabronum =

Town in Ahafo Ano South East District, Ghana

Coordinates: 7°05′14″N 1°53′09″W

Sabronum is a town located in the Ahafo Ano South East District of the Ashanti Region of Ghana. It is the largest settlement in the district, with an estimated population of over 10,000 inhabitants. The town is situated about 72 km north-west of Kumasi. Sabronum is noted for the 40-bed capacity Sabronum Government Hospital, and Sabronum Methodist Senior High Technical School. Sabronum is also distinguished by its proximity to Mountain Kwamisa, which rises to approximately 788 meters above sea level. The mountain is recognised as the highest peak in the Ashanti Region and the 4th highest in Ghana.

== Economy ==
Agricultural farming is the predominant occupation in Sabronum. The major cash crops grown in this area are cocoa and tomato. Foodstuffs such as plantain, cocoyam, maize and cassava are also grown on subsistence basis in Sabronum and its catchment areas.
