= Agyamasu =

Community in Ashanti Region, Ghana

- Country: Ghana
- Region: Ashanti Region
- District: Bekwai District

Agyamasu is a community in the Bekwai District in the Ashanti Region of Ghana.

== Institution ==
- Agyamasu Municipal JHS
