= Asaman =

Town in Afigya Sekyere District, Ashanti Region, Ghana

Asamang
- Town
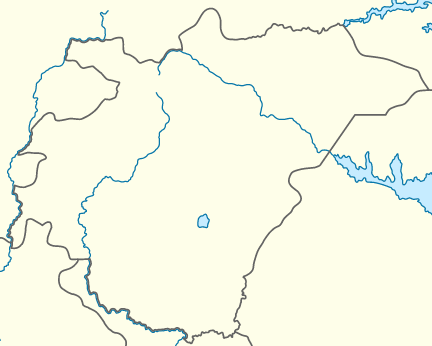
- Location of Asaman in Ashanti
- Coordinates: 6°26′N 1°52′W
- City-State: Ashanti
- District: Afigya Sekyere District

Population
  - Ethnicities: Asante
  - Religions: Christianity Islam and African Traditional Religion Other
- Time zone: UTC+0 (Greenwich Mean Time)
  - Summer (DST): GMT

Asaman is a village in the Afigya Sekyere District of Ashanti. The village is known for the Konadu Yiadom Secondary School. The school is a second cycle institution.
