= Alex Adomako-Mensah =

Ghanaian politician (born 1962)

Hon. Alex Adomako-Mensah
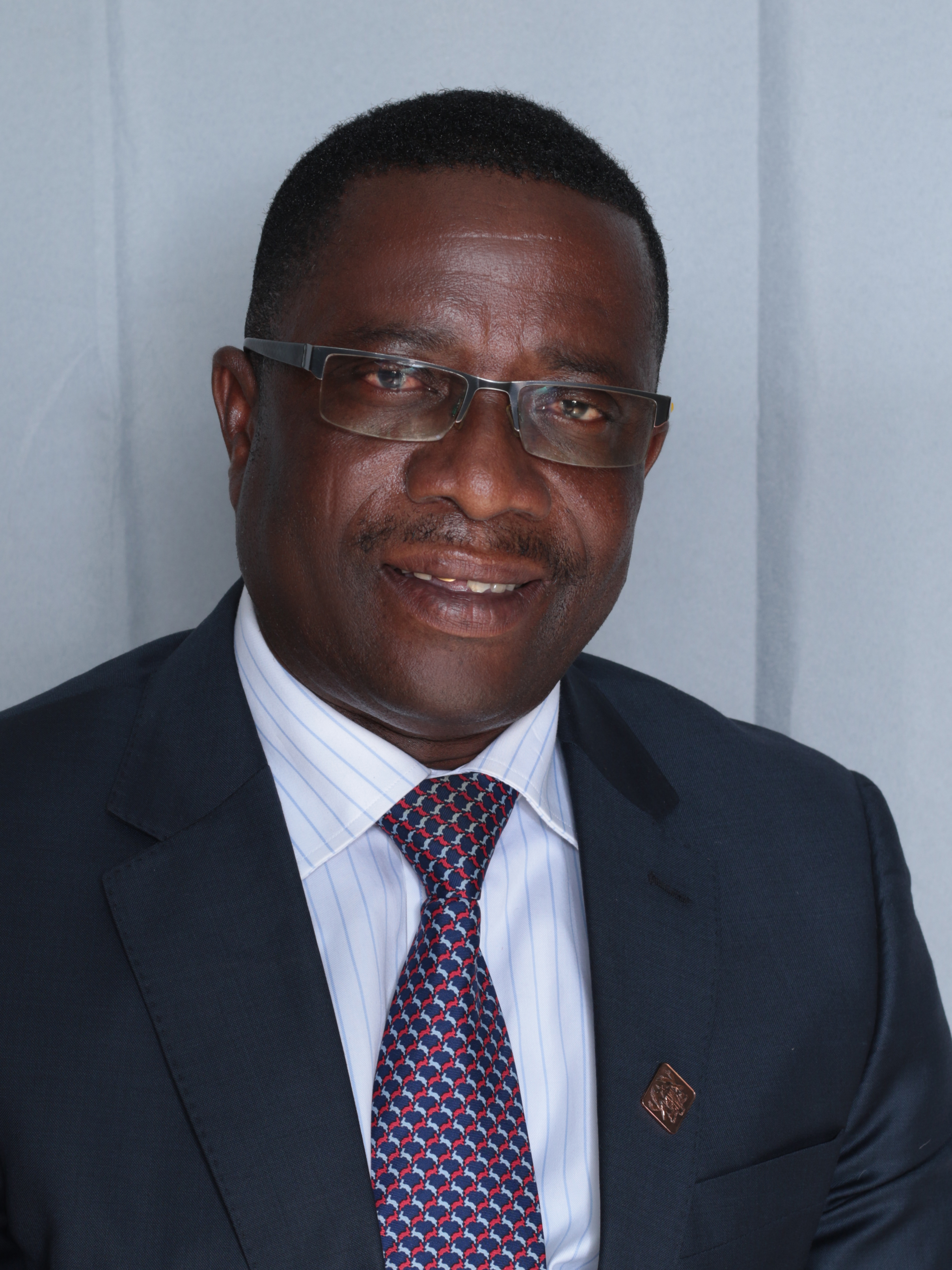

Member of the Ghana Parliament for Sekyere Afram Plains Constituency
- In office 7 January 2005 – 6 January 2025
- President: Nana Akufo-Addo
- Succeeded by: Nasira Afrah Gyekye
- President: John Atta Mills; John Mahama

Personal details
- Born: 5 November 1962 (age 64) Kumawu, Ashanti Region, Ghana
- Party: National Democratic Congress
- Occupation: Politician
- Profession: Banker/ Administrator
- Committees: Finance Committee, Food and Cocoa Affairs Committee

Alex Adomako-Mensah (born 5 November 1962) is a Ghanaian politician and Member of Parliament for Sekyere Afram Plains Constituency in the Ashanti Region, Ghana.

== Early life ==
He was born on 5 November 1962 and hails from Kumawu in the Ashanti Region.

== Education ==
Alex Adomako-Mensah earned his MBA in (UK) from the University of Leicester, in 2001. He became an Associate Member (ACIM) of the Chartered Institute of Marketing, UK in 2003 and was honored as a Member of the Chartered Management Institute (MCMI) by the Chartered Institute of Marketing, UK in 2006.

== Political life ==
He is a member of the National Democratic Congress who was voted as part of the MPs elected in the Ghanaian parliamentary election in 2016 to represent Sekyere Afram plains. He won the seat with 5,664 votes out of the 9,275 valid votes cast generating 60.85% of the total votes cast.

=== 2020 election ===
Alex Adomako-Mensah contested the Sekyere Afram Plains constituency parliamentary seat on the ticket of the National Democratic Congress during the 2020 Ghanaian general election and won with 8,079 votes representing 50.49% over the Parliamentary candidate for the New Patriotic Party Joseph Gyamfi Owusu who had 7,923 votes which is equivalent to 49.51% of the total votes.

=== Committees ===
He is a member of the Employment, Social Welfare, and State Enterprises Committee and also a member of the Finance Committee.

== Robbery attack ==
On 14 August 2017, the MP was attacked by some unidentified armed robbers on his way from Kumasi heading towards Kumawu in the evening.

== Personal life ==
He is a Christian and married with five children.
