= Patrick Boakye-Yiadom =

Ghanaian politician

Hon. Dr. Patrick Boakye-Yiadom
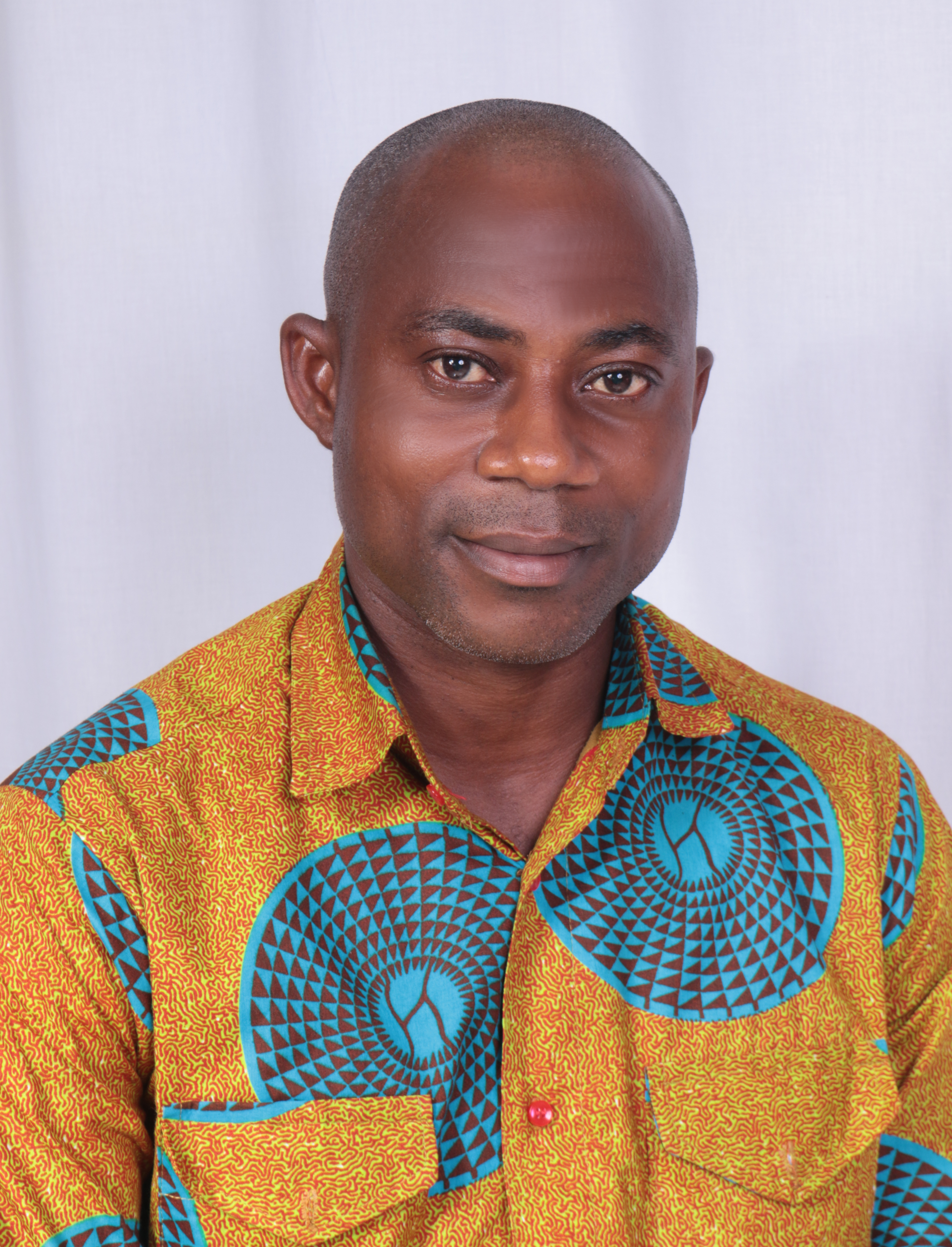

Member of Parliament for Obuasi East Constituency
- Incumbent
- Assumed office 7 January 2021

Personal details
- Born: Patrick Boakye-Yiadom; 2 November 1976 (age 49) Obuasi, Ghana
- Party: New Patriotic Party
- Occupation: Politician
- Profession: Medical Doctor
- Committees: Health Committee (Vice chairperson); Government Assurance Committee; Works and Housing Committee

Patrick Boakye-Yiadom is a Ghanaian politician and member of the Seventh Parliament of the Fourth Republic of Ghana and Eighth Parliament of the Fourth Republic of Ghana representing the Obuasi East Constituency in the Ashanti Region on the ticket of the New Patriotic Party. He is the Parliamentary Candidate for the New Patriotic Party in Obuasi East.

== Early life and education ==
Patrick was born on 2 November 1976 and hails from Obuasi in the Ashanti region. He completed his basic in 1988, his BECE in 1991, and his SSSCE in 1994. He obtained a Bachelor of Science degree in human biology in 2000 and a MBChB in General Medical Practitioner in 2003. He is a student of KNUST in the 2003 Class of the School of Medical Science.

== Career ==
Patrick was the Deputy Medical Director for the Bryant Mission Hospital in Obuasi. He is a medical doctor.

== Political career ==
Patrick is a member of NPP and currently the MP for the Obuasi East Constituency in the Ashanti region.

=== 2016 General elections ===
In the 2016 Ghana general elections, he won the parliamentary seat with 27,715 votes whilst the NDC parliamentary aspirant Richard Ofori-Agyeman Boadi had 10,604 votes and the PPP parliamentary aspirant Patrick Aboagye Danyansah also had 1,318 votes whiles the CPP parliamentary aspirant Emmanual Oduro Fosu had 98 votes and the PNC parliamentary Shaibu Fuseini had 66 votes.

=== 2020 General elections ===
In the 2020 Ghana general elections, he again won the parliamentary seat with 27,583 votes whilst the NDC parliamentary aspirant Samuel Aboagye had 14,786 votes.

==== Committees ====
Patrick is the Vice chairperson of the Health Committee, a member of the Government Assurance Committee and also a member of the Works and Housing Committee.

== Personal life ==
Patrick is a Christian.

== Philanthropy ==
In 2020, Patrick provided about 20 beds to four hospitals in the Obuasi East Constituency.

In August 2022, he presented popcorn machines, deep freezers, fufu pounding machines and some bags of charcoal to PWDs in the Obuasi East District.
