= Sekyere Afram Plains (Ghana parliament constituency) =

Constituency in the Ashanti Region of Ghana

- constituency for the Parliament of Ghana
- District: Sekyere Afram Plains District
- Region: Ashanti Region of Ghana

Current constituency
- Party: National Democratic Congress
- MP: Nasira Afrah Gyekye

Sekyere Afram Plains is one of the constituencies represented in the Parliament of Ghana. It elects one Member of Parliament (MP) by the first past the post system of election. Nasira Afra Gyekye is the member of parliament for the constituency. Sekyere Afram Plains is located in the Sekyere Afram Plains District in the Ashanti Region of Ghana.

== Boundaries ==
The seat is located within the Sekyere Afram Plains District of the Ashanti Region of Ghana. This constituency was part of the newly created constituency for 2012 general elections in Ghana.

== Elections ==
2016 Ghanaian parliamentary election: Sekyere Afram Plains Source:
Party	Candidate	Votes	%	±%
National Democratic Congress	Alex Adomako Mensah	5,644	60.85	
New Patriotic Party	Joseph Owusu	3,549	38.26	
Great Consolidated Popular Party	Peter Marfo	82	0.88	
Majority		2,095	9.88	22.59

2012 Ghanaian parliamentary election: Sekyere Afram Plains Source[]
Party	Candidate	Votes	%	±%
National Democratic Congress	Jacob Kofi Dankwah	5,701	63.26	
New Patriotic Party	Bright Owusu-Kwarteng	1,882	20.88	
Independent Candidate	Samuel Kwame Amponsah	1,131	12.55	
National Democratic Party	Jambeidu Eliasu Bansumah	209	2.32	
Independent Candidate	Mohammed Mumin Musah	89	0.99	
Majority		3,819	9.88	42.38

== See also ==
- List of Ghana Parliament constituencies
