= Nasira Afrah Gyekye =

Ghanaian politician

Hon. Nasira Afrah Gyekye MP

Member of the Ghana Parliament for Sekyere Afram Plains
- Incumbent
- Assumed office 7 January 2025
- Preceded by: Alex Adomako-Mensah
- President: John Dramani Mahama
- Vice President: Jane Naana Opoku-Agyemang

Personal details
- Born: 10 June 1992 (age 34) Drobonso, Ashanti Region, Ghana
- Party: National Democratic Congress
- Education: Ghana Institute of Management and Public Administration (MPA, International Relations and Diplomacy – Dec 2024) (BPA, Public Administration & Governance – Sept 2021)
- Occupation: Politician
- Profession: International relations expert

Nasira Afrah Gyekye (10 June 1992) is a Ghanaian politician and international relations expert serving as the Member of Parliament for the Sekyere Afram Plains Constituency in the Ashanti Region. She represents the National Democratic Congress (NDC) in the Ninth Parliament of the Fourth Republic of Ghana.

== Early life and education ==
Gyegye was born on 10 June 1992 and hails from Drobonso in the Ashanti Region of Ghana. She had her bachelor's degree in Public Administration and Governance from GIMPA. She further had her masters in International Relations and Diplomacy from the same institution.

== Politics ==
In May 2023, she stood for the National Democratic Congress primaries for Sekyere Afram Plains constituency, winning the primaries polling 211 votes against the incumbent Alex Adomako-Mensah who garnered 86 votes and her cloest contender Kwabena Duffuor who second with 208 votes and Edward Brenyah who got 65 votes.

In the 2024 General Elections, Gyekye contested the Sekyere Afram Plains constituency against George Akom, the candidate for the New Patriotic Party (NPP). She secured 11,524 votes (70.92%), narrowly defeating George Akom, who garnered 4,725 votes (29.08%).

== Personal life ==
Gyegye is a Muslim.
