= Jacobu =

- District Capital
- Location in Ghana
- Coordinates: 6°21′N 1°40′W
- Country: Ghana
- Region: Ashanti Region
- District: Amansie Central District
- Elevation: 643 ft (196 m)
- Website: www.amansiecentral.gov.gh

Jacobu is the capital town of Amansie Central, a district in the Ashanti Region of Ghana. It is near Bekwai, the capital of the Bekwai Municipal. Jacobu and its neighbouring towns form the Odotobri paramountcy.

The current chief of Jacobu is Nana Fosu Kwadjobri. Jacobu is rich in resources including gold and timber, and also exports most Ghanaian foodstuffs, as the people are farmers. The town is known for the Jacobu Secondary Technical School, which is a second cycle institution.
