= Clement Opoku Gyamfi =

Ghanaian politician

Hon. Clement Opoku Gyamfi
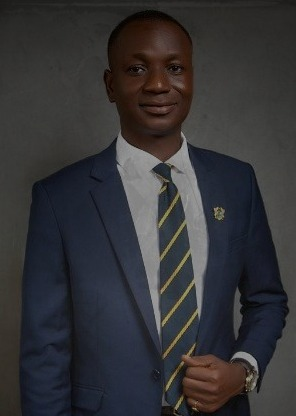
- Incumbent
- Assumed office 6 August 2020

Personal details
- Party: New Patriotic Party
- Education: Ghana Institute of Management and Public Administration, Kumasi Technical University

Clement Opoku Gyamfi also known as CID, is a Ghanaian politician who represents the people of Amansie South as the District Chief Executive (DCE).

== Early life and education ==
His father, John Awuni, was a police officer, and his mother, Sophia Yaa Konadu Duku, was a businesswoman.

In his education journey, he attended Newman International School and Bantama Station Basic School for his basic education, then he attended Asanteman Senior High School for his secondary education. Gyamfi began his tertiary studies at Kumasi Technical University, graduating with a Higher National Diploma (HND), then proceeded to Ghana Institute of Management and Public Administration for his Bachelor of Science degree.

== Career ==
Gyamfi worked at the Ghana Cocoa Board.

== Political career ==
On 6 August 2020, Gyamfi was appointed as the District Chief Executive (DCE) by President Nana Akuffo-Addo to manage activities and engagement around the Amansie South District.

== Honours ==
He was adjudged the most outstanding DCE of the year at the National Students Awards.
