= Akrofuom Senior High Technical School =

Mixed second cycle institution in Akrofuom, Ghana

Coordinates: 6°07′35″N 1°39′11″W

- Akrofuom, Ashanti Region; Ghana

Information
- Type: secondary/high school, Technical
- Motto: Knowledge and Skill
- Established: 1991 (35 years ago)
- Grades: Forms [1-3]

Akrofuom Senior High Technical School is a second cycle institution located in Akrofuom in the Adansi South District in the Ashanti Region of Ghana.

== History ==
The school was established in 1991. The first headmaster of the school was Mr. E. K. Osei. In 2011, the headmaster of the school was Mr. Peter Amponsah. In 2018, the assistant headmaster of the school was Mr. Jacob Anakpor. In 2018, Anglogold Ashanti Mining Company donated books to the Akrofuom SHTS and other schools in Obuasi Municipality.

The school began with 21 Students and 8 Teachers.

== See also ==
- Opoku Ware School
