= Frimpong Yaw Addo =

Ghanaian politician (born 1962)

Hon. Dr. Frimpong Yaw Addo
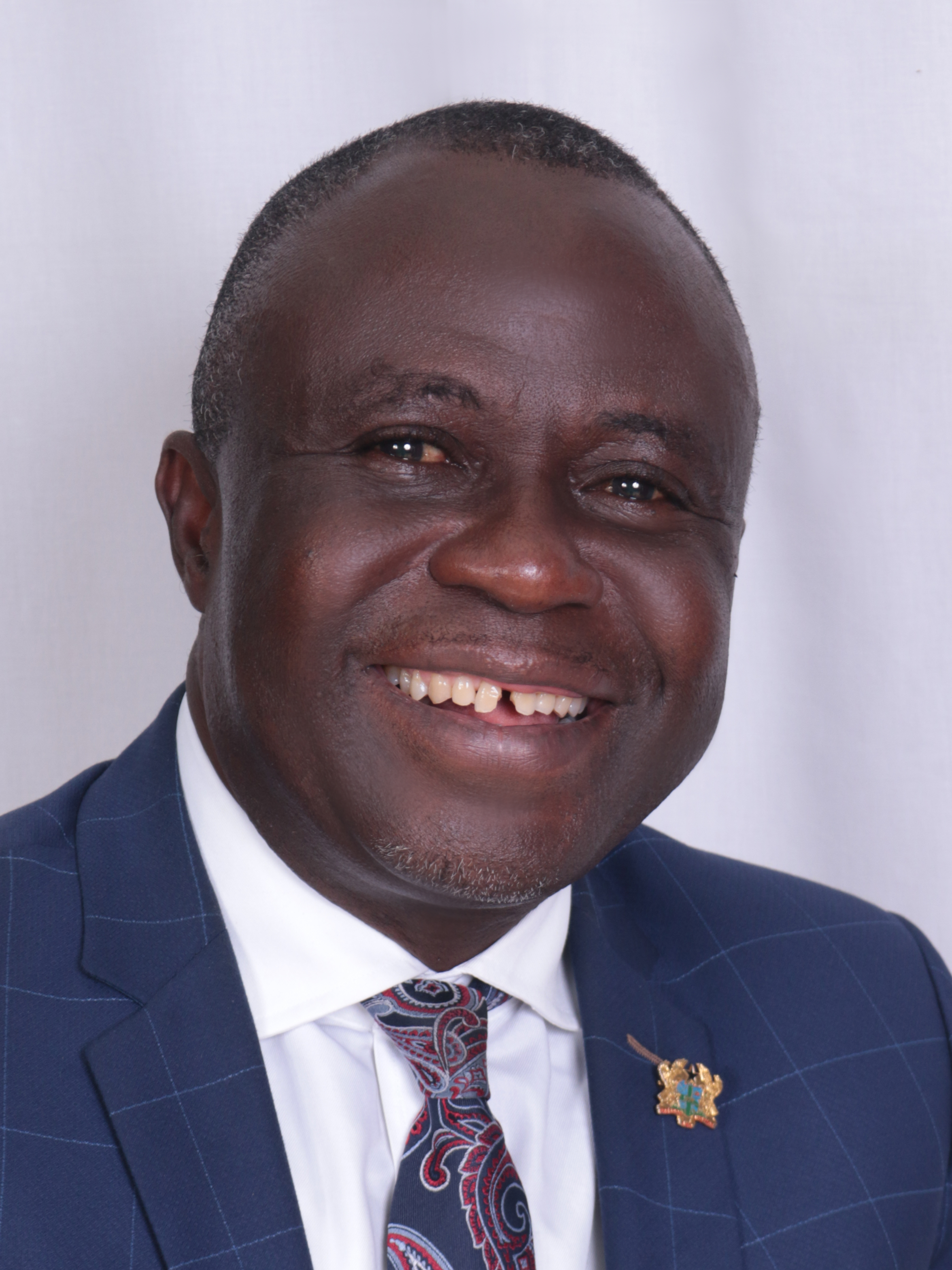

Member of Parliament for Manso Adubia Constituency, Deputy Minister for Food and Agriculture
- Incumbent
- Assumed office 7 January 2021

Personal details
- Born: Frimpong Yaw Addo; 2 September 1962 (age 63) Manso Gyeduako, Ghana
- Party: New Patriotic Party (NPP)
- Occupation: Politician
- Profession: Consultant, Farmer
- Committees: Poverty Reduction Strategy Committee; Environment, Science and Technology Committee

Frimpong Yaw Addo (born 2 September 1962) is a Ghanaian politician and member of the Seventh Parliament of the Fourth Republic of Ghana and Eight parliament of the Fourth Republic of Ghana representing the Manso Adubia constituency in the Ashanti Region on the ticket of the New Patriotic Party (NPP). He is currently the Deputy Minister for Food and Agriculture.

== Early life and education ==
Addo was born on Sunday, 2 September 1962 in the town of Manso Gyeduako in the Amansie South District in the Ashanti Region. He earned his Bachelor of Arts degree in Sociology and Diploma in English from University of Cape Coast in 1990. He also obtained an Executive Master's certificate in Conflict, Peace and Security in 2016 at the Kofi Annan International Peacekeeping Training Centre in Accra.

== Career ==
Addo was the Manager of Corporate Social Responsibility Department, Private Enterprise Foundation. He was also the Social and Environment impact expert at Comptran Engineering. He was also the Social and Environment impact expert at Transtel Consult. He was also the programme's liaison officer at National Democratic Institute for International Affairs.

== Political career ==
Addo is a member of the New Patriotic Party and currently the member of parliament for Manso Adubia Constituency in the Ashanti Region. He became the first MP for his constituency after emerging top in the 2012 Ghanaian General Elections. He was then re-elected for the second and third term in the 2016 and 2020 Ghanaian general election.

=== 2012 election ===
Hon. Addo first contested the Manso Adubia constituency parliamentary seat on the ticket of the New Patriotic Party during the 2012 Ghanaian general election and won with 26,368 votes representing 74.97% of the total votes. He was elected over Benjamin Marfo of the National Democratic Congress who polled 8,326 votes which is equivalent to 23.67% and the parliamentary candidate for the NDP Obeng Appiah Collins had 478 votes representing 1.36% of the total votes.

==== 2016 election ====
Addo was re-elected as a member of parliament for the Manso Adubia constituency on the ticket of the New Patriotic Party during the 2016 Ghanaian general election with 24,074 votes, representing 69.86% of the total votes. He won the election over Benjamin Marfo of the National Democratic Congress, Isaac Bronya of the Progressive People's Party and Adom Selina of the PNC. They obtained 7, 112 votes, 3, 092 votes and 183 votes respectively, equivalent to 20.64%, 8.97% and 0.53% of the total votes respectively.

===== 2020 election =====
In the 2020 General elections, Addo won the parliamentary seat with 17,652 votes making 38.8% of the total votes cast whiles the NDC parliamentary candidate Simon Kwaku Agyei had 10,753 votes making 23.6% of the total votes. The Independent candidate Kofi Osei-Afoakwa also had 17,149 votes making 37.7% of the total votes cast.

He faced the appointments committee on 3 June 2021 and came out successfully as Deputy Minister for Agriculture.

Addo is a member of Poverty Reduction Strategy Committee and also a member of Environment, Science and Technology Committee.

== Personal life ==
He is a Christian and married with five children. He likes farming and soccer.
