= Akyempem Festival =

Festival in Ghana by the people of Agona

Akyempem Festival is an annual festival celebrated by the chiefs and peoples of Agona Traditional Area in the Ashanti Region of Ghana. It is usually celebrated in the month of September. Sometimes it is celebrated in October.

== Celebrations ==
During the festival, visitors are welcomed to share food and drinks. The people put on traditional clothes and there is durbar of chiefs. There is also dancing and drumming. During the festival, the stools of the land are purified and traditional rites are performed. There is also pouring of libation to the gods for general well-being of the people and their prosperity.
