= Drobonso =

Community in Ashanti Region, Ghana

- Location in Ghana
- Country: Ghana
- Region: Ashanti Region
- District: Sekyere Afram Plains District

Drobonso is a community and the district capital of the Sekyere Afram Plains District, a district in the Ashanti Region of Ghana.

== Institutions ==
- Miro Forestry Limited, a factory which deals in the manufacturing of veneer and plywood.
- Kumawuman Rural Bank
- Drobonso Health Service
- Drobonso Police Station
- Community Day School

== Notable natives ==
- Nasira Afrah Gyekye, Ghanaian politician
