= Francis Manu-Adabor =

Ghanaian politician

Hon. Francis Manu-Adabor MP
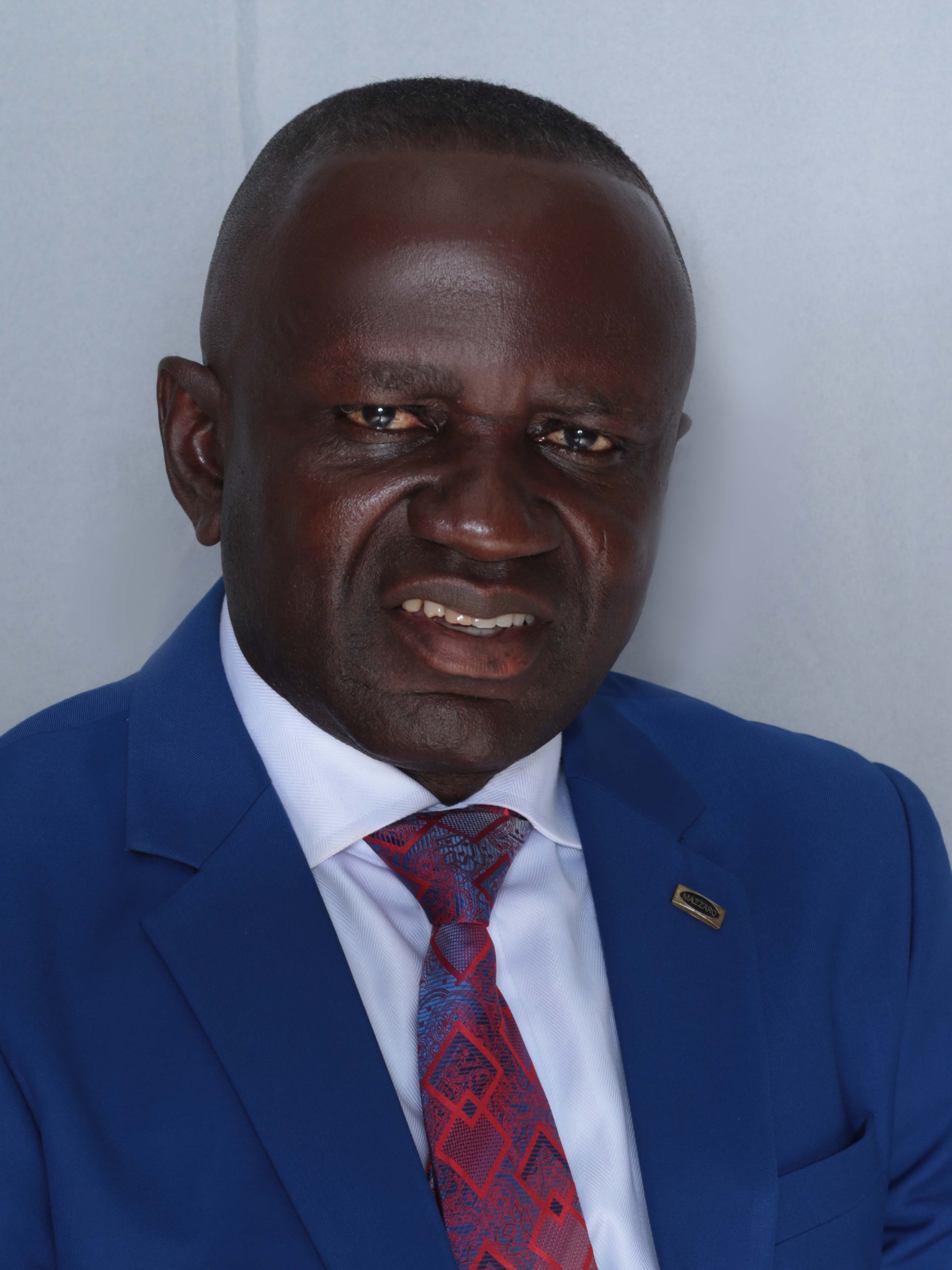

Member of Parliament for Ahafo Ano South East Constituency
- In office 7 January 2021 – 6 January 2025
- Succeeded by: Yakubu Mohammed

Personal details
- Born: Francis Manu-Adabor; 24 September 1960 (age 65) Biemso No 1, Ghana
- Party: New Patriotic Party
- Occupation: Politician
- Profession: Surveyor
- Committees: Lands and Forestry Committee; Judiciary Committee and Mines and Energy Committee

Hon. Francis Manu-Adabor (born 24 September 1960) is a Ghanaian politician and member of the Seventh Parliament of the Fourth Republic of Ghana and the 8th Parliament of the Fourth Republic of Ghana. He was representing the Ahafo Ano South East in the Ashanti Region on the ticket of the New Patriotic Party.

== Early life and education ==
Manu-Adabor was born on 24 September 1960 at Biemso No.1 in the Ashanti Region of Ghana. He had his Ordinary Level in 1979 and his Advanced Level in 1981. He earned his bachelors of science degree at Kwame Nkrumah University of Science and Technology and his postgraduate diploma at Obafemi University. He also had his master's degree at the University College, London (UCL). He was a licensed surveyor in land surveying.

== Career ==
He was the Ashanti regional head, principal, of survey school from 1988 to 2007. He was a technical manager at Ghana Cocoa Board from 2007 to 2012. He was also a board member for Cocoa Processing Company Limited.

=== Political life ===
Manu-Adabor is a member of NPP. He was a majority member of the 6th parliament of the 4th republic of Ghana. He was re-elected in the 2020 general election to represent in the 8th Parliament of the Fourth Republic of Ghana. He won the parliamentary seat with 15,136 votes making 53.80% of the total votes whiles the NDC parliamentary candidate Yakubu Mohammed had 12,999 votes making 46.20% of the total votes.

=== Committees ===
He was appointed as chairperson of Lands and Forestry Committee, government assurance committee, and constitutional, legal and parliamentary affairs committee. Currently, he is chairperson for the Lands and Forestry Committee, a member of the Judiciary Committee and a member of the Mines and Energy Committee.

== Personal life ==
Manu-Adabor identifies as a Christian and he fellowships at the Catholic church. He is married with five children.

== Philanthropy ==
In 2014, he donated five packets of roofing sheets to help in the construction of the Pokukrom Ibrahimia Islamic Basic School. He also donated three packets of roofing sheets to the Amoakokrom District Assembly Junior High School, five packets of roofing sheets to the Asudei Islamic Basic School and 30 bags of cement to the Nsuta Roman Catholic Basic School.
