= Tontokrom =

Town in Ashanti Region, Ghana

- Small Town
- Location within Ghana
- Coordinates: 6°15′0″N 2°0′0″W
- Country: Ghana
- Region: Ashanti Region
- District: Amansie South District
- Time zone: GMT
  - Summer (DST): GMT

Tontokrom is a small town located in the Amansie South District in the Ashanti Region of Ghana. It is mostly known for its gold and has recently been noted for the menace of illegal mining popularly called galamsey.
