= Frank Boakye Agyen =

Ghanaian politician

Hon. Frank Boakye Agyen
- Constituency: Effiduase Asokore

Member of Parliament
- In office 7 January 2009 – 6 January 2013
- President: John Atta Mills

Personal details
- Born: 6 January 1946 (age 80)
- Party: New Patriotic Party
- Education: University of Ghana
- Occupation: Lawyer

Frank Boakye Agyen is a Ghanaian politician and was a member of the 5th and 6th Parliaments of the 4th Republic of Ghana representing the people of Effiduase Asokore constituency in the Ashanti Region of Ghana.

== Early life and education ==
He was born on 6 January 1946. He hails from in a town known as Effiduase in the Ashanti region. He had his Bachelor of Arts in law and political science from the University of Ghana in 1984. He then proceeded to the Ghana School of Law to obtain his Bachelor of Laws in 1989.

== Career ==
Agyen is a lawyer. He worked with Boakye Agyen Chambers in Accra as a senior partner before going into politics. He was the former board chairman of the Ghana Cylinder Manufacturing Company.

== Politics ==
Agyen was a member of the Fifth Parliament of the 4th Republic of Ghana. He began his career in politics after being elected in the 2008 Ghanaian general elections on the ticket of the New Patriotic Party as the member of parliament for the Effiduase Asokore constituency with 18,859 votes out of the 23,799 total valid votes cast, equivalent to 79.24%. He won against Kwadwo Adae of the National Democratic Congress, George Asiamah of the Convention People's Party and Lovia Berko of the People's National Convention. These obtained respectively 18.72%, 0.71% and 1.33% of total valid votes cast.

== Personal life ==
He is a Christian and married with four children.
