= Kwafokrom (Ashanti Region) =

Community in Ashanti Region, Ghana

- Village
- Country: Ghana
- Region: Ashanti Region
- District: Ahafo Ano North Municipal District
- Time zone: GMT
  - Summer (DST): GMT

Kwafokrom is a town in the Ahafo Ano North District in the Ashanti Region of Ghana. The Chief of the town as at 2016 was Nana Offei Kwafo I.
