= Asokore =

- Country: Ghana
- Region: Ashanti Region

Asokore is a town in the Ashanti Region of Ghana. The town is known for T.I. Ahmadiyya Girls Senior High School, Krobea-Asante Senior High, Tijjania Senior High school and Nasir Children Training Centre one of the oldest Basic International School in the District established in 1984. These schools are second cycle institutions. Asokore is located in the Sekyere East district of Ashanti Region. It is second biggest town in the district and its capital town is Effiduase in the Ashanti region. Asokore is located 40 kilometers from Kumasi, the capital of Ashanti Region. Asokore is the headquarters of Asokore Rural Bank which has many branches in Kumasi and surrounding towns.
