= Obuasi East (Ghana parliament constituency) =

Constituency in the Ashanti Region of Ghana

- constituency for the Parliament of Ghana
- District: Obuasi East District
- Region: Ashanti Region of Ghana

Current constituency
- Party: New Patriotic Party
- MP: Patrick Boakye-Yiadom

Obuasi East is one of the constituencies represented in the Parliament of Ghana. It elects one Member of Parliament (MP) by the first past the post system of election.

Patrick Boakye-Yiadom is the member of parliament for the constituency. He was elected on the ticket of the New Patriotic Party (NPP) won a majority of 27,715 votes to become the MP

== See also ==
- List of Ghana Parliament constituencies
