= Afigya Sekyere District =

- District
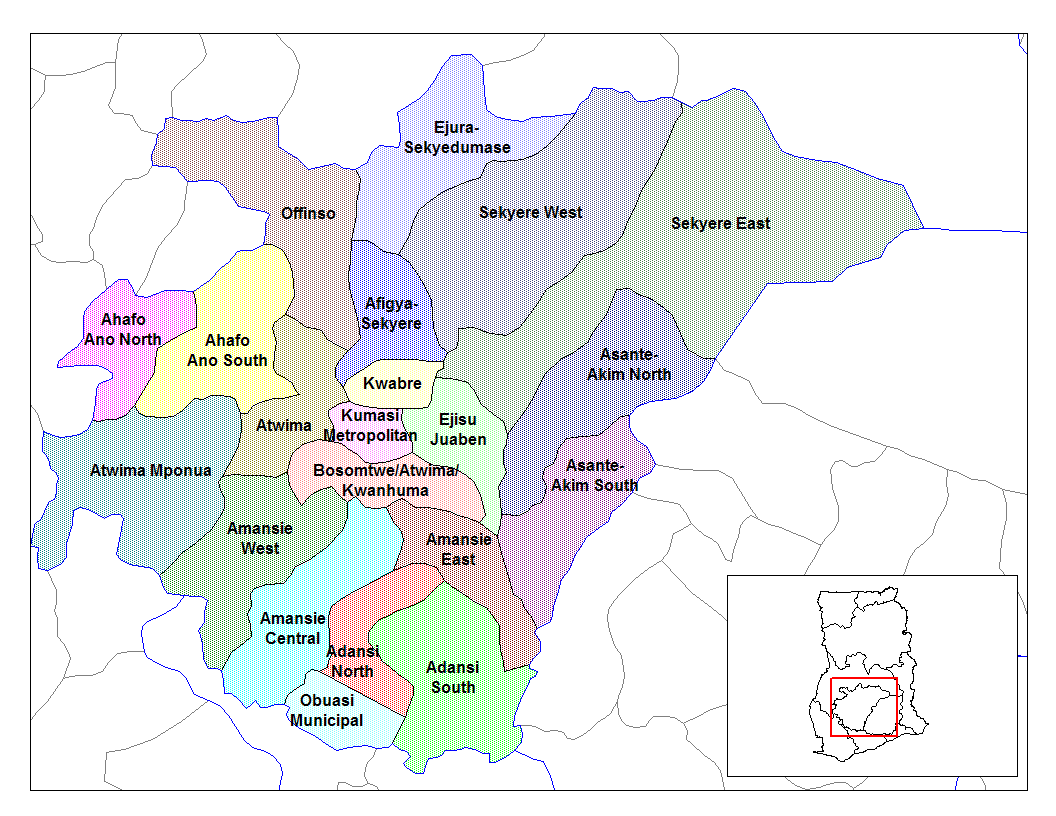
- Districts of Ashanti Region

- Location of Sekyere South District within Ashanti
- Coordinates: 6°47′N 1°36′W
- Country: Ghana
- Region: Ashanti
- Capital: Agona

Government
  - District Executive: Ben Abankwa

Area
  - Total: 770 km^{2} (300 sq mi)

Population (2012)
  - Total: —
- Time zone: UTC+0 (GMT)

Afigya Sekyere District is a former district that was located in Ashanti Region, Ghana. Originally created as an ordinary district assembly in 1988, which it was created from part of the former Kwabre-Sekyere District Council; untl the western part of the district (the Afigya portion) was split off to become the northern portion of Afigya-Kwabre District on 1 November 2007 (effectively 29 February 2008); while the remaining portion has since then been officially renamed as Sekyere South District. The district assembly was located in the eastern part of Ashanti Region and had Agona as its capital town.

== Sources ==
- Sekyere South Districts
