= Ahafo Ano South East (Ghana parliament constituency) =

Constituency in the Ashanti Region of Ghana

- constituency for the Parliament of Ghana
- District: Ahafo Ano South District
- Region: Ashanti Region of Ghana

Current constituency
- Created: 2016
- Party: National Democratic Congress
- MP: Yakubu Mohammed

Ahafo Ano South East is one of the constituencies represented in the Parliament of Ghana. It elects one Member of Parliament (MP) by the first past the post system of election. Yakubu Mohammed is the member of parliament for the constituency. Ahafo Ano South East is located in the Ahafo Ano South district of the Ashanti Region of Ghana.

== Boundaries ==
The seat is located within the Ahafo Ano South District of the Ashanti Region of Ghana. This constituency was part of the newly created constituency for the 2016 general elections in Ghana.

== Members of Parliament ==
| Election | Member | Party |
|---|---|---|
| 2016 | Francis Manu-Adabor | New Patriotic Party |

== Elections ==
2016 Ghanaian parliamentary election: Ahafo-Ano South East Source: Ghanaweb
| Party | Candidate | Votes | % | ±% |
|---|---|---|---|---|
| New Patriotic Party | Francis Manu-Adabor | 14,198 | 54.84 | |
| National Democratic Congress | Chris Boadi-Mensah | 11,640 | 44.96 | |
| Convention People's Party | Awini Zechariah | 54 | 0.21 | |
| Majority | | 2,558 | 9.88 | |

== See also ==
- List of Ghana Parliament constituencies
