= Akrofuom District =

District in Ghana

- District
- Districts of Ashanti Region

- Location of Akrokfom District within Ashanti
- Coordinates: 6°17′15″N 1°39′13″W
- Country: Ghana
- Region: Ashanti
- Capital: Akrofuom

Area
  - Total: 568.3 km^{2} (219.4 sq mi)

Population (2021 Census)
  - Total: 49,291
  - Density: 86.73/km^{2} (224.6/sq mi)
- Time zone: UTC+0 (GMT)
  - Summer (DST): GMT

Afrokuom District is one of the forty-three districts in Ashanti Region, Ghana. Originally it was formerly part of the then-larger Adansi South District on 17 February 2004, until the western part of the district was split off to create Afrokuom District on 15 March 2018; thus the remaining part has been retained as Adansi South District. The district assembly is located in the southern part of Ashanti Region and has Akrofuom as its capital town.

== See also ==
- 2025 Ghanaian Air Force Z-9 helicopter crash

== Sources ==
- "Adansi North District". Statoids.
