= Manso Adubia (Ghana parliament Constituency) =

Constituency in the Ashanti Region of Ghana

- constituency for the Parliament of Ghana
- District: Amansie West District
- Region: Ashanti Region of Ghana

Current constituency
- Created: 2016
- Party: New Patriotic Party
- MP: Frimpong Yaw Addo

Manso Adubia is one of the constituencies represented in the Parliament of Ghana. It elects one Member of Parliament (MP) by the first past the post system of election. Manso Adubia is located in the Amansie West District of the Ashanti Region of Ghana.

== Boundaries ==
The seat is located within the Amansie West District of the Ashanti Region of Ghana.

== Members of Parliament ==
Election	Member	Party
2016	Addo Frimpong Yaw	New Patriotic Party

== Elections ==
2016 Ghanaian parliamentary election: Manso Adubia Source: http://ghanaelections.peacefmonline.com/pages/2016/parliament/ashanti/
Party	Candidate	Votes	%	±%
New Patriotic Party	Addo Frimpong Yaw	24,074	69.86	—
National Democratic Congress	Benjamin Marfo	7,112	20.64	—
Progressive People's Party	Isaac Bronya	3,092	8.97	—
People's National Convention	Adom Selina	183	0.53	—
Majority		24,074	69.86	—
Turnout				

== See also ==
- List of Ghana Parliament constituencies
