= Barekese =

Coordinates: 6.854210°N 1.719017°W

- Urban area
- Location within Ghana
- Country: Ghana
- Region: Ashanti Region
- District: Atwima Nwabiagya North District
- Time zone: GMT
  - Summer (DST): GMT

Barekese is a town and capital of the Atwima Nwabiagya District within Ashanti Region, Ghana. It is home to the Barekese Dam and Barekese Senior High School.
