= Adugyama =

- District Capital
- Location in Ghana
- Coordinates: 6°49′N 1°52′W
- Country: Ghana
- Region: Ashanti Region
- District: Ahafo Ano South East District
- Elevation: 682 ft (208 m)

Adugyama is a town and is the capital of Ahafo Ano South East District in the Ashanti Region of Ghana. It is about 42 km north-west of Kumasi

Adugyama is noted for the Adugyama Community Senior High (ADHISS).

== Economy ==
Agricultural farming is the predominant occupation in Adugyama. The major cash crops grown in this area are cocoa and rice Foodstuffs such as plantain and cassava are also grown on subsistence basis in Adugyama and its catchment areas.
