= Yakubu Mohammed (politician) =

Ghanaian politician

Hon. Yakubu Mohammed MP

Member of Parliament for Ahafo Ano South East
- Incumbent
- Assumed office 7 January 2025
- Preceded by: Francis Manu-Adabor
- President: John Mahama
- Vice President: Jane Naana Opoku-Agyemang

Personal details
- Born: 7 November 1989 (age 36) Abesewa
- Party: National Democratic Congress
- Occupation: Politician
- Committees: Sanitation and Water Resources; Budget

Yakubu Mohammed (born, November 7, 1989) is a Ghanaian politician and businessman who serves as the Member of Parliament for Ahafo Ano South East in the Ashanti Region. He represents the National Democratic Congress (NDC) in the Ninth Parliament of the Fourth Republic of Ghana.

== Early life and education ==
Mohammed was born in Abesewa, Ashanti Region, on 7 November 1989. He completed his secondary education at Tamale Senior High School and went on to earn a BSc in Earth Science from the University for Development Studies in July 2013. He later completed an MBA at Cardiff Metropolitan University in February 2016.

== Politics ==
Mohammed contested and won the Ahafo Ano South East seat in the December 7, 2024 general election, for the National Democratic Congress (Ghana). He prevailed with 15,609 votes (52.45%), defeating NPP candidate Frederick Acheampong, who received 14,152 votes (47.55%). He serves on the Sanitation and Water Resources Committee and the Budget Committee in Parliament.
