= Ahafo Ano South East District =

Ahafo Ano South West District
- District
- Districts of Ashanti Region

- Location of Ahafo Ano South West District within Ashanti
- Coordinates: 6°49′N 1°52′W
- Country: Ghana
- Region: Ashanti
- Capital: Mankranso

Area
  - Total: 1,126 km^{2} (435 sq mi)

Population (2021 Census)
  - Total: 63,468
  - Density: 56.37/km^{2} (146.0/sq mi)
- Time zone: UTC+0 (GMT)

Ahafo Ano South East District is one of the forty-three districts in Ashanti Region, Ghana. Originally it was formerly part of the then-larger Ahafo Ano South District in 1988, which was created from the former Ahafo Ano District Council, until part of the district was split off to create Ahafo Ano South East District on 15 March 2018; thus the remaining part has been renamed as Ahafo Ano South West District. The district assembly is located in the western part of Ashanti Region and has Adugyama as its capital town.

== Sources ==
- "Districts of Ghana". Statoids.
- GhanaDistricts.com
