= Atwima Nwabiagya North District =

- District
- Districts of Ashanti Region

- Location of Atwima Nwabiagya North District within Ashanti
- Coordinates: 6°51′N 1°43′W
- Country: Ghana
- Region: Ashanti
- Capital: Barekese

Area
  - Total: 276.6 km^{2} (106.8 sq mi)

Population (2021 Census)
  - Total: 155,025
  - Density: 560.5/km^{2} (1,452/sq mi)
- Time zone: UTC+0 (GMT)

Atwima Nwabiagya North District is one of the forty-three districts in Ashanti Region, Ghana. Originally it was part of the then-larger Atwima Nwabiagya District, until the northern part of the district was split off to create Atwima Nwabiagya North District on 15 March 2018. The remaining part was renamed Atwima Nwabiagya Municipal District when it was elevated to municipal district assembly status on that same year. The district assembly is located in the western part of Ashanti Region and has Barekese as its capital town.

== Sources ==
- "Districts of Ghana". Statoids.
- GhanaDistricts.com
