= Bosome Senior High Technical School =

Second cycle institution in Asiwa, Asante, Ghana

Coordinates: 6.418°N 1.333°W

- BOSOME
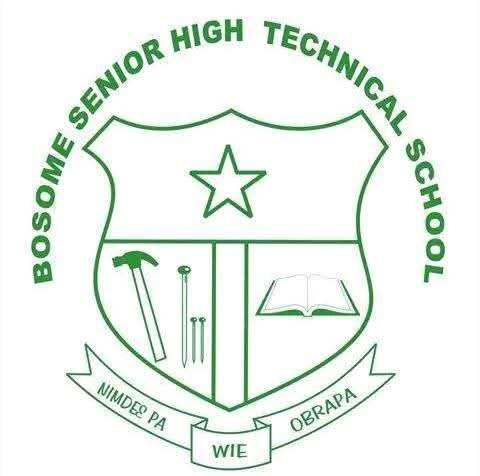

Location
- P O Box 220; Asiwa; Asante Region; Ghana

Information
- Type: Public school, Day and boarding
- Motto: nimdeɛ pa wie ɔbrapa
- Religious affiliation: none
- Established: 2006 (20 years ago)
- Category: C
- Gender: Mixed
- Age: 14 to 17
- Enrolment: 3 years
- Houses
- Colour
- Song: arise and shine
- Nickname: Nsoromma🌟
- Alumni: Nsoromma

Bosome Senior High Technical School (also known as BOSTECH) is a second-cycle, government-assisted mixed institution located in Asiwa, the capital of the Bosome Freho District in Ghana's Asante Region. Established to serve the local communities, it is the only second-cycle school in the district capital Asiwa in the Bosome Freho District.

- Links https://www.facebook.com/BosomeSeniorHighTechnicalSchool https://www.tiktok.com/@bosomeseniorhightechsch http://instagram.com/bosomeseniorhightechschool https://youtube.com/@bosomeseniorhightechschool

== Facilities ==
An overview of the current status of the school's facilities highlights key infrastructure details:

- Academic Infrastructure

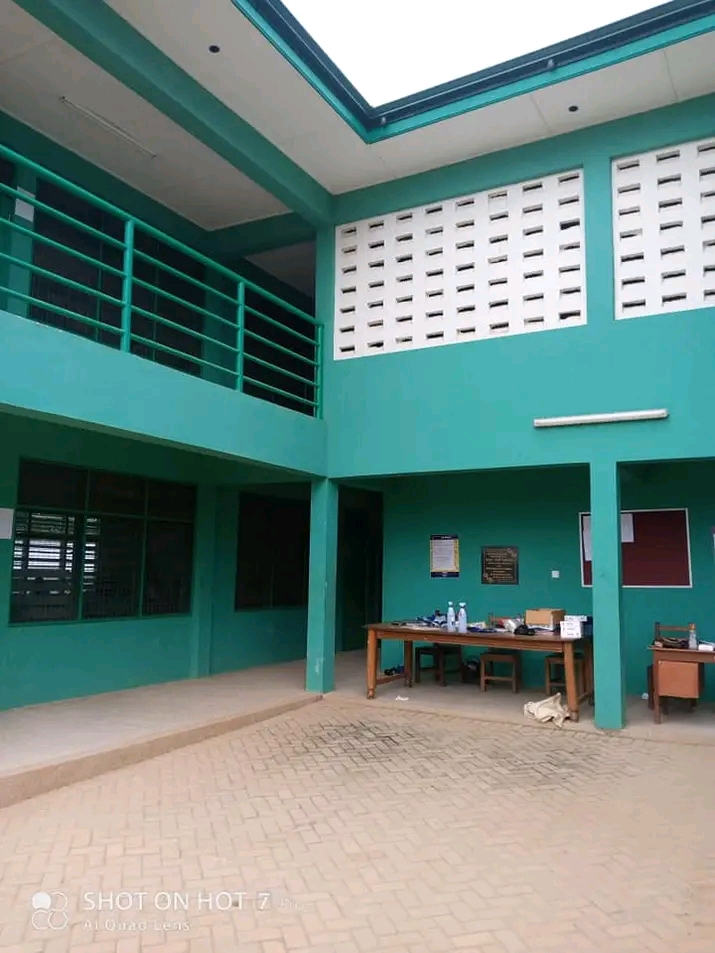
Bosome Senior High Technical School Classroom Block

1. Classroom Blocks: Includes a primary 12-unit classroom block funded by the Ghana Education Trust Fund (GETFund).Science and Technical Workshop: The school operates a make-shift, multi-purpose laboratory that serves Physics, Chemistry, and Applied Electricity practicals simultaneously. School management has routinely petitioned the government for a dedicated, fully-furnished technical workshop to eliminate the need to transport students to neighboring schools for advanced practical sessions.
- Residential and Sanitation Facilities
1. Dormitories: The campus features two government-funded dormitory blocks built to accommodate its growing boarding population.Girls' Bathhouse & Laundry Complex: An ultramodern bathroom and laundry facility was constructed for the female students by Nickseth Construction. This complex includes showers, modern toilets, dry-lines, and a mechanized borehole system to supply water.General Sanitation: Features a 12-seater toilet facility to support campus hygiene.
- Dining Hall
1. The school's permanent dining hall has faced construction delays. Because of this, students frequently attend dining in three separate batches or groups to manage space.

== Academics ==
Bosome Senior High Technical School (BOSTECH) offers six main academic programmes designed to prepare students for both higher tertiary education and technical career fields.

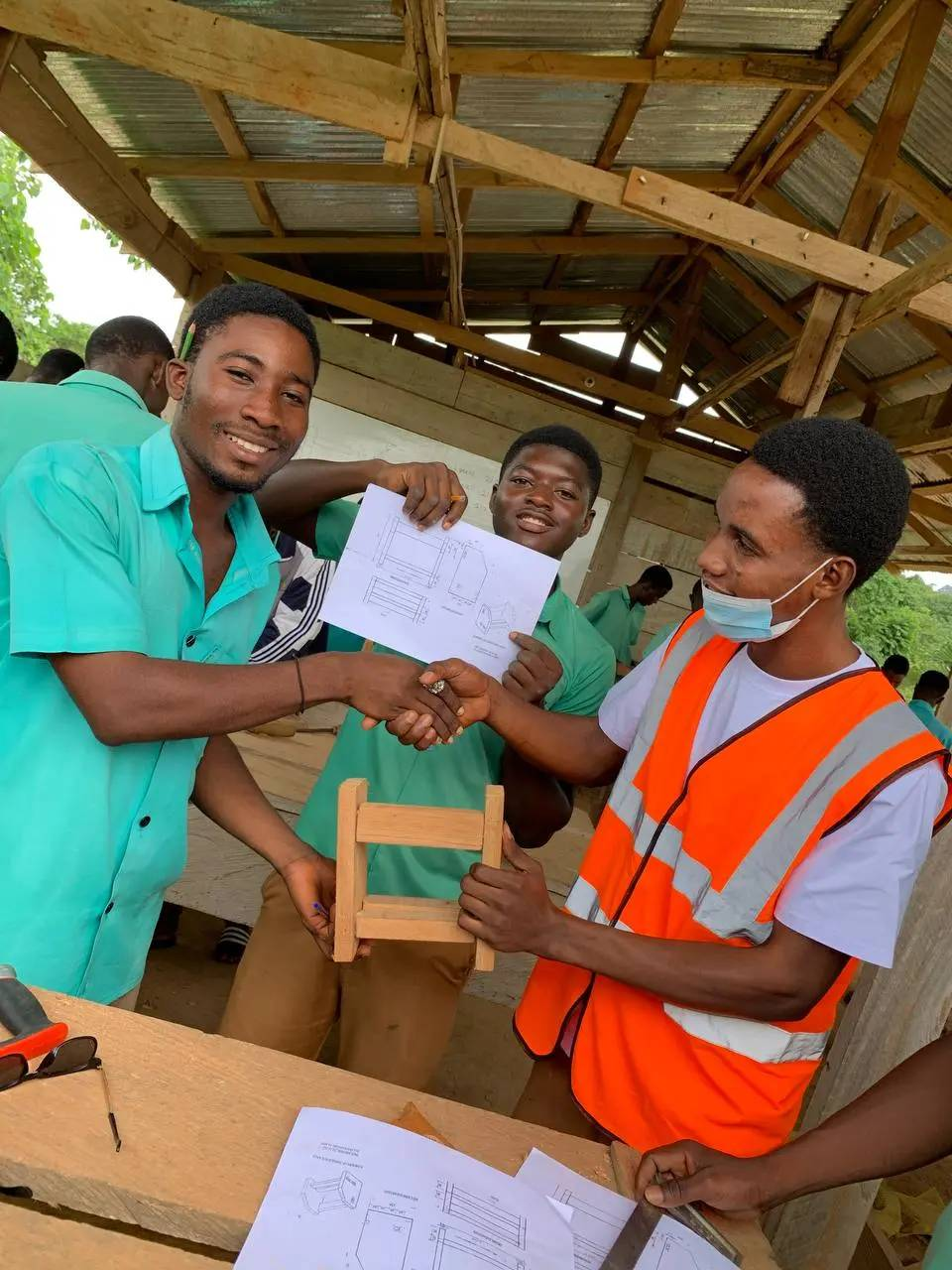
Bosome Senior High Technical School Technical class

- Core Subjects

Regardless of their specialized programme, all students are required to take the following core subjects:

1. Core Mathematics
2. English Language
3. Integrated Science
4. Social Studies
- Elective Academic Programmes

Students choose one specific stream to specialize in from the following paths:

1. Technical: Focused on applied engineering, woodwork, and building technology.

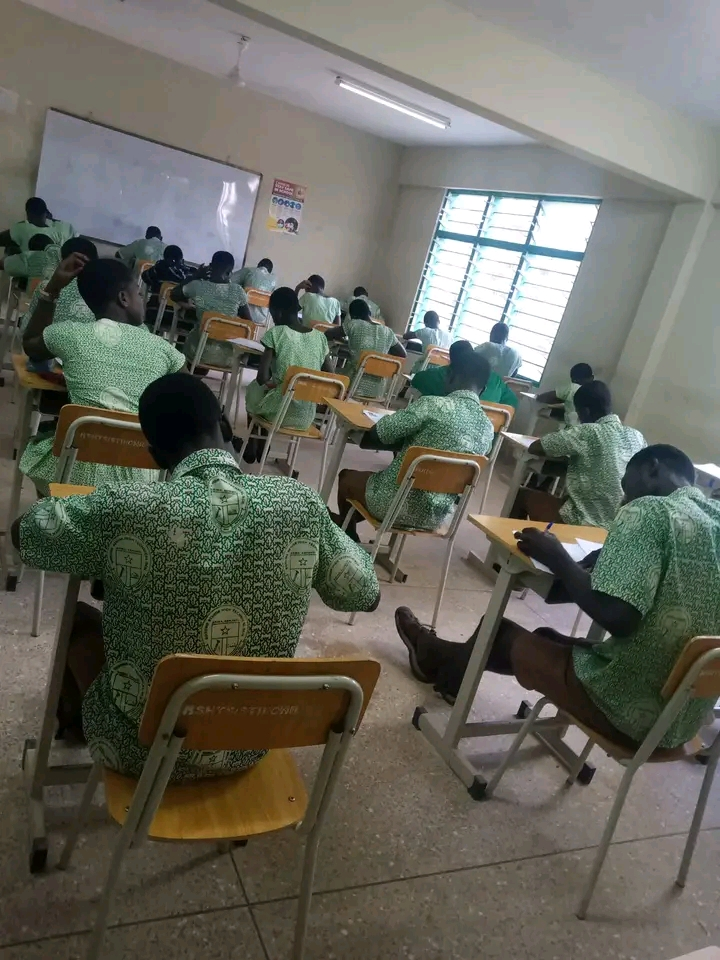
Bosome Senior High Technical School Class

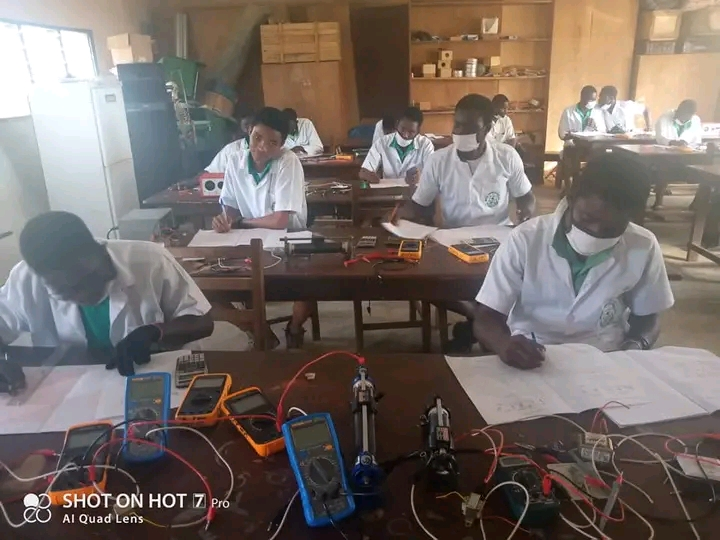
Bosome Senior High Technical School Electric Class

1. General Science: Preparing students for medicine, engineering, and scientific research.

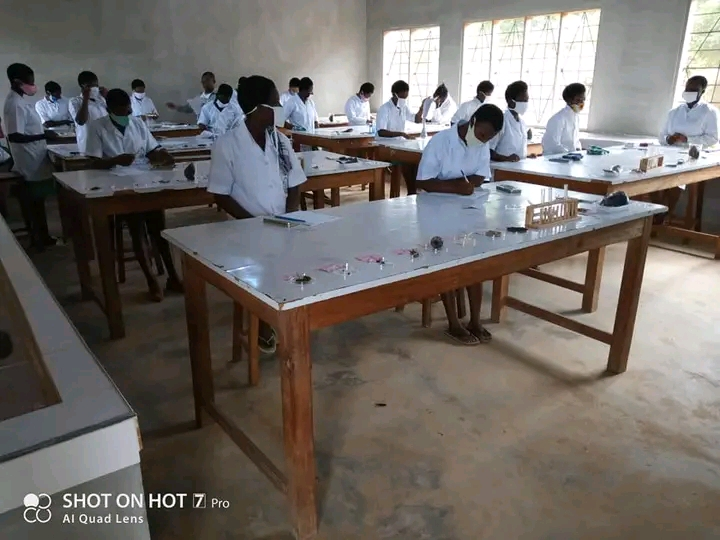
Bosome Senior High Technical School Science Class

1. Agricultural Science: Covering crop production, animal husbandry, and agricultural economics.
2. Business: Tailored for accounting, business management, and economics.
3. General Arts: Focusing on geography, economics, history, government, and local/foreign languages.
4. Home Economics: Emphasizing food and nutrition, clothing and textiles, and management in living.

The academic structure is fully managed under the Ghana Education Service (GES) guidelines, preparing students directly for the West African Senior School Certificate Examination (WASSCE).

. .
