= Bekwai =

Town in Ashanti Region, Ghana

Bɛkwae (Bekwai) = Bɛkwae
- Town
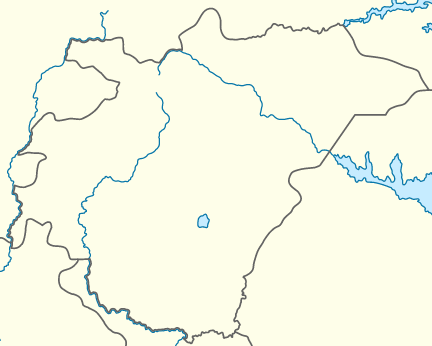
- Location of Bekwai in Ashanti, Central Ghana Bɛkwae (Bekwai) (Ghana)
- Coordinates: 6°27′13″N 1°35′02″W
- Country: Ghana
- Region: Ashanti
- District: Bekwai Municipal

Government
  - Type: Mayor–council
  - Municipal mayor: Hon. Kwaku Kyei Baffour
- Elevation: 240–300 m (790–980 ft)

Population (2013)
  - Total: 7,267
  - Ethnicities: Akan; Ewe; Guan (Guang); Mandé; Gurma; Gurunsi; Mole-Dagbon
  - Religions: Christianity; Islam; Traditional African religions
- Ranked 79th in Ghana
- Time zone: GMT
  - Summer (DST): GMT
- Postcode district: AB
- Area code: 032 24
- Climate: Aw
- Website: bma.gov.gh

Bɛkwae (Bekwai) (/bækˈwaɪ/) is a town and the capital of the Bekwai Municipal, a municipality in the Ashanti Region of Ghana. Bekwai is the seventy-ninth most populous settlement in Ghana, with a population of 7,267 people as of 2013. Bekwai and Bekwai Municipal are south of Kumasi and north of Obuasi. As of 2021, the mayor of the municipal is Hon. Kwaku Kyei Baffour.

== Geography ==
=== Municipal area ===
Bekwai is located in the Bekwai Municipal, which covers a land area of 535.2 km^{2} (206.6 sq mi). The district bordered the Bosomtwe District to the north, the Adansi North District towards the south, the Bosome Freho District to the east and the Amansie Central District and Amansie West District towards the west.

=== Topography ===
The town lies within a forestry region along with being relatively flat, with the average elevation between 150 and 300 m (490 and 980 ft) while the town's elevation ranges from 240 to 300 m (790 to 980 ft).

=== Climate ===
Bekwai has a tropical savanna climate (Köppen climate classification Aw), experiencing an all-year long rainy season peaking in June, September, and October. Due to this rainfall pattern, farming in the town is characterized by major and minor cropping seasons. The climate is the driest in December and January along with low relative humidity while the rainy season experiences around 85% relative humidity. The average mean temperature is around 32 °C (90 °F).

== Demographics ==
Most of Bekwai's population subscribes to Christianity, followed by Islam and Traditional African religions. There are many ethnic groups who lived in the town with the majority belonging to the Akan, followed by the Ewe, Guan (Guang), Mandé, Gurma, Gurunsi, Mole-Dagbon.

== Administration ==
The municipality has a mayor–council form of government. The mayor (executive chief) is appointed president of Ghana and approved by the municipality council, the Bekwai Municipal Assembly. As of 2021, the current mayor of the municipal is Hon. Kwaku Kyei Baffour.

== Economy ==
Most of the population is engaged in agriculture, accounted for about 65.5% of all households. The good climate conditions along with the good soil may contribute to the popularity of farming in the area.

== Telecommunication ==
There are a total of 27,000 telephone lines that are installed throughout the Bekwai along with the municipality.

== Healthcare ==
The town is home to the Bekwai Municipal Hospital, a 120-bed facility which was commissioned in November 2020 after a bunch of delays. Construction started in the early 1970s, coming in at a total of US$25,000,000. The facility contains an outpatient department, emergency unit, and a physiotherapy department.

== Education ==
The following is a list of secondary schools in Bekwai:

- Seventh Day Adventist Secondary School
- Wesley High Senior Secondary School
- College Of Accountancy
- St. John Senior High School
- Otumfuo Osei Tutu II International School, Bekwai
- Victory International School, Bekwai
- Central International School, Bekwai
- Jehova Nissi Preparatory and JHS
- Milli-Isaac Preparatory Academy Bekwai
- Adventist Preparatory School Bekwai Tunsuom
- Nana Kodom Educational Complex Senfi Bekwai
- Methodist Primary and JHS Bekwai

== Train station ==
There is a train station in Bekwai.

== See also ==
- Railway stations in Ghana
