= Nana Ayew Afriye =

Ghanaian politician

Hon. Dr. Nana Ayew Afriye
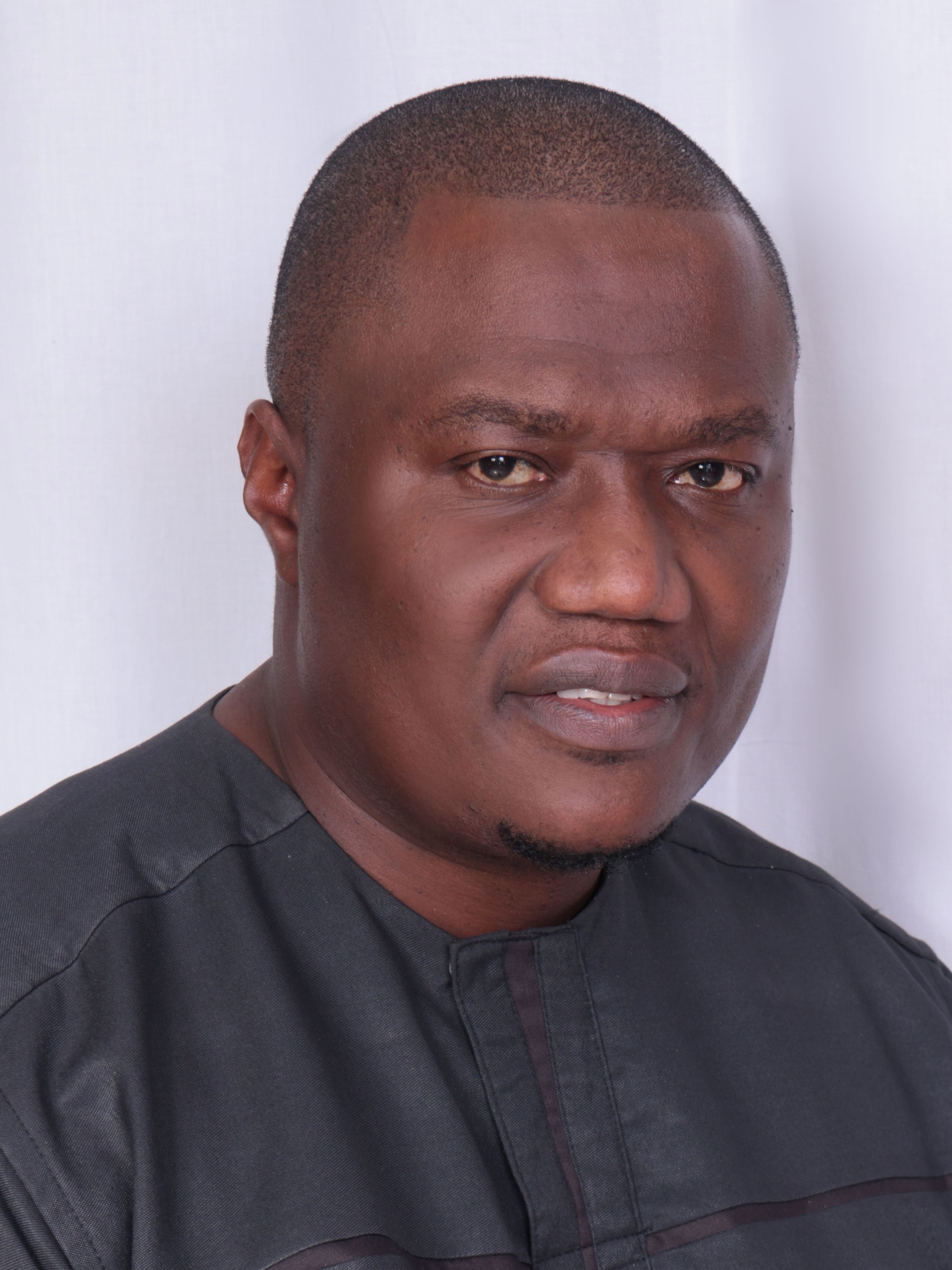

Member of Ghana Parliament for Effiduase-Asokore Constituency
- Incumbent
- Assumed office 7 January 2021
- President: Nana Addo Dankwa Akufo-Addo

Personal details
- Born: 22 January 1978 (age 48) Effiduase, Ghana
- Party: New Patriotic Party
- Education: University of Ghana; University of Leeds
- Occupation: Politician
- Profession: Doctor
- Committees: Health Committee; Finance Committee

Dr. Nana Ayew Afriye is a Ghanaian politician and member of the Seventh Parliament of the Fourth Republic of Ghana representing the Effiduase-Asokore Constituency in the Ashanti Region on the ticket of the New Patriotic Party.

== Early life and education ==
Afriye was born on 22 January 1978 and hails from Effiduase in the Ashanti Region of Ghana. In 2004, he had his Bachelor of Medicine and Bachelor of Surgery from the University of Ghana and also a Post Graduate Certificate in Health Economics from the Oxford University. In 2009, he further had his MA in Economics Policy Management from the University of Ghana. In 2011, he had his MPH in Health Economics from the University of Leeds in UK.

== Career ==
Afriye was the CEO of St. Johns Hospital and Fertility located at Tantra Hills in Accra. He was also the Head Institutional Public Health at the Ridge Hospital.

== Politics ==
Afriye is a member of the New Patriotic Party and the member of parliament for Effiduase-Asokore Constituency in the Ashanti Region.

=== Committees ===
Afriye is the Chairperson for the Health Committee and also a member of the Finance Committee.

== Personal life ==
Afriye is a Christian. He has four children.
