= Tutuka =

Community in Ashanti Region, Ghana

- Town
- Location of Tutuka in Ashanti Region, Ghana Tutuka (Africa)
- Coordinates: 6.12°N 1.38°W
- Country: Ghana
- Region: Ashanti Region
- Metropolitan: Obuasi East District
- Time zone: GMT
  - Summer (DST): GMT

Tutuka is a community near Obuasi in the Obuasi East District in the Ashanti Region of Ghana.

== Institutions ==
- Tutuka Methodist Church-Ghana
- Foot-Light Bible Church, Tutuka branch
