= Sekyere Kumawu (district) =

Sekyere Kumawu District
- District
- Districts of Ashanti Region

- Location of Sekyere Kumawu District within Ashanti
- Coordinates: 6°55′N 1°17′W
- Country: Ghana
- Region: Ashanti
- Capital: Kumawu

Government
  - District Chief Executive: Hon.Jacob Kofi Dankwah

Population (2021)
  - Total: 64,396
- Time zone: UTC+0 (GMT)

Sekyere Kumawu District is one of the forty-three districts in Ashanti Region, Ghana. Originally it was part of the then-larger Sekyere East District, which was created from the former Sekyere District Council. Later, a large portion of the district was split off to create the 1st Sekyere Afram Plains District on 1 November 2007 (inaugurated on 29 February 2008), with Kumawu as its capital town. However on 28 June 2012, the Afram Plains area of the district was split off to create the new Sekyere Afram Plains District, with Dobrosno as its capital town; while the remaining part has since then been officially renamed as Sekyere Kumawu District, with Kumawu as its capital town. The district assembly is located in the eastern part of Ashanti Region and has Kumawu as its capital town.

== Educational facilities ==
As of 2014, the district had 55 kindergartens, 55 primary schools, 45 junior high schools and four senior high schools. It also had a vocational technical school. There are two tertiary institutions and three libraries.

== Towns ==
- Kumawu
- Bodomase
- Oyoko
- Banko
- Dadease
- Sekyere
- Besoro
- Asekyerewa
- Abotanso
- Bodwease
- Wonoo
- Pepease
- Woraso
- Akrokyere
- Akronfoso
- Akotosu
- Temate
- Aninya
- Ntarentare
- Bahankra
