= Manso Adubia =

Coordinates: 6°24′N 1°56′W

- Interactive map of Manso Adubia
- Country: Ghana
- Region: Ashanti Region

Manso Adubia is a town in the Ashanti Region of Ghana. It is the capital of the Amansie South District. The town is known for the Manso Adubia Senior High School.
