= Asokwa Interchange =

Location
- Kumasi, Ghana

Construction

The Asokwa Interchange is an interchange under construction in Kumasi, Ghana.
