= Dadease =

Coordinates: 6°53′N 1°22′W

- Interactive map of Dadease
- Country: Ghana
- Region: Ashanti Region

Dadease is a town in the Ashanti Region of Ghana. The town is known for the Dadease Agriculture Secondary School. The school is a second cycle institution.
