= Tepa, Ghana =

Tepa Tepaman
- Town and District Capital
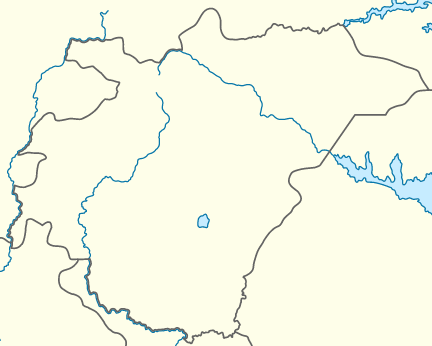
- Location of Tepa within Ashanti
- Coordinates: 7°0′N 2°10′W
- Sovereign state: Ghana
- Region: Ashanti
- District: Ahafo Ano North Municipal District

Government
  - Omanhene: Dr. Nana Adusei Atwenewa Ampem
- Elevation: 797 ft (243 m)

Tepa is the capital of Ahafo Ano North, a municipality in the Ashanti Region of Ghana. The old town of Tepa is known as Kelebim. Kelebim can be found in Tepa Ward 1 (Banieh Krom) and the new town is also known as Restco. The major occupation of the people there is farming and trading

The Ahafo Ano North Municipal is among the 43 Metropolitan, Municipal, and District Assemblies (MMDAs) in the Ashanti region of Ghana, and it is also part of the 260 Metropolitan, Municipal, and District Assemblies (MMDAs) in Ghana as a whole. In the year 1988, a legislative instrument (LI1402) was introduced by an Act of Parliament to create the Ahafo Ano North district and now it has been upgraded to a municipal, with Tepa as the capital.

Tepa is the district's capital and is located 70 kilometers from Kumasi. Manfo, Akwasiase, Mabang, Anyinasuso, Asuhyiae, and Betiako are prominent towns in the area.

== Agriculture ==
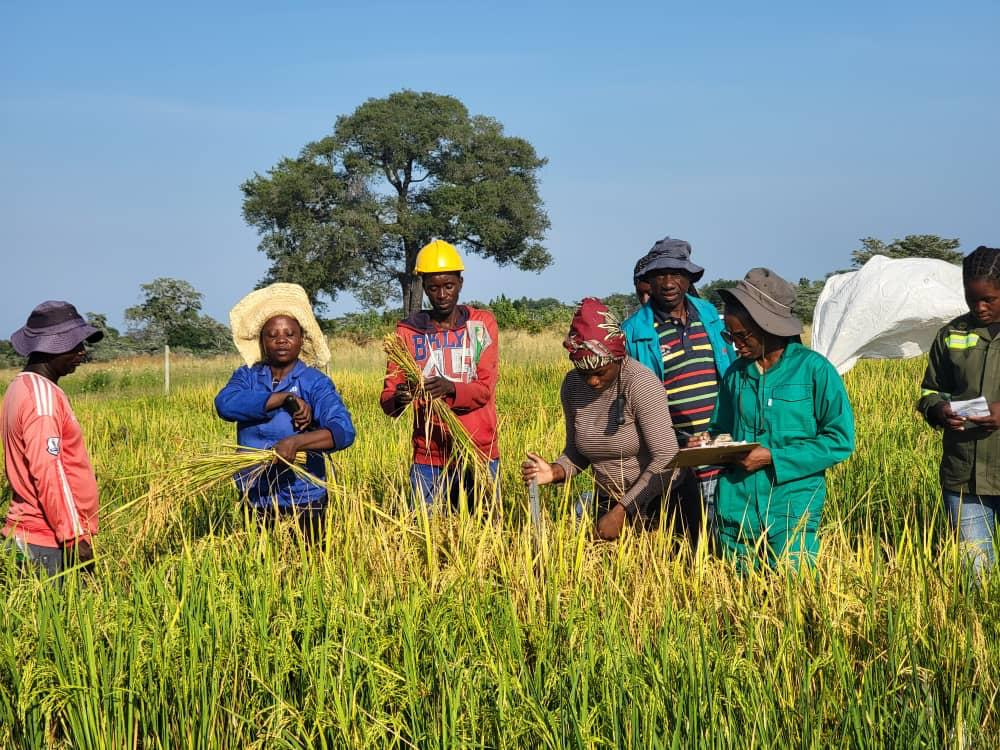
Rice farming

Rice farming in Tepa, Ghana, is vital for local food security. Farmers use traditional and modern methods, facing challenges like weather fluctuations and limited access to resources. Government and NGO support helps improve cultivation and access to markets, contributing to the local economy and livelihoods. Tepa is widely known for rice production.
