= Akrofuom =

- Location within Ghana
- Coordinates: 6°7′15″N 1°39′13″W
- Country: Ghana
- Region: Ashanti Region

Akrofuom is a town on Gyimi River in the Ashanti Region of Ghana. It is the capital of the Akrofuom District. Nana Abena Durowaa I enstooled in December 1999 is the current queenmother of the area. The town is known for the Akrofuom Senior High Technical School. The school is a second cycle institution.

== Ashanti Goldfield Corporation ==
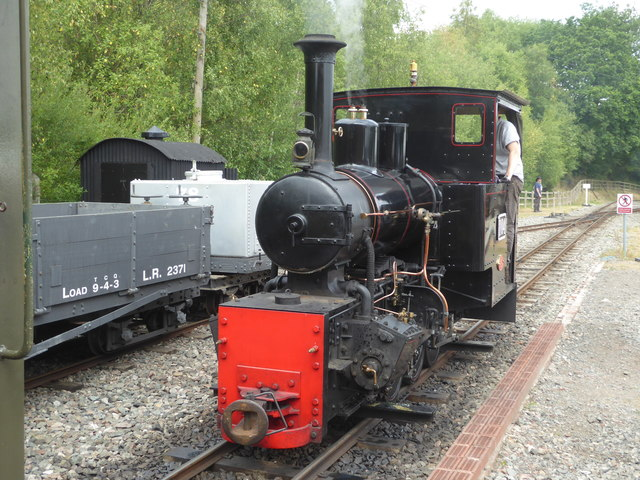
Hudswell Clarke as No. 1238 of 1916, now on the Apedale Valley Light Railway in England

The Ashanti Goldfield Corporation operated a 2 ft (610 mm) gauge railway near Akrofuom. They used a 0-6-0WT well tank locomotive built by Hudswell Clarke as No. 1238 of 1916. It was, however, plated as Robert Hudson, who had placed the order. Its working life ended in 1952 when it fell into a river near Akrofuom, killing its driver and was abandoned.
