= Amansie Central District =

- District
- Districts of Ashanti Region

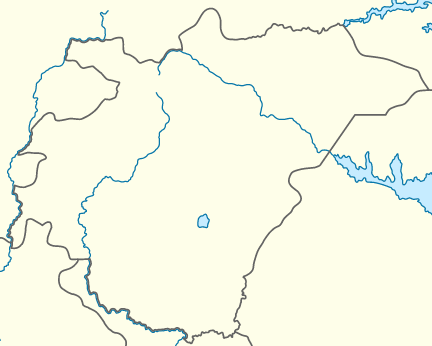
- Location of Amansie Central District in Ashanti
- Coordinates: 6°34′N 1°57′W
- Country: Ghana
- Region: Ashanti
- Capital: Jacobu

Government
  - District Executive: Michael Donkor

Area
  - Total: 710 km^{2} (270 sq mi)

Population (2021 Census)
  - Total: 93,052
  - Density: 130/km^{2} (340/sq mi)
- Time zone: UTC+0 (Greenwich Mean Time)
  - Summer (DST): GMT

Amansie Central District is one of the forty-three districts in Ashanti Region, Ghana. It was formerly part of the larger Amansie East District, until the western part of the district was split off by a decree of president John Agyekum Kufuor on 12 November 2003 (effectively 18 February 2004) to create Amansie Central District. The remaining part has been retained as Amansie East District (now currently known as Bekwai Municipal District). The district assembly is located in the southern part of Ashanti Region and has Jacobu as its capital town.

== Sources ==
- "Amansie Central District". Statoids.
- 19 New Districts Created , GhanaWeb, November 20, 2003.
