= Ahafo Ano South District =

- Former District
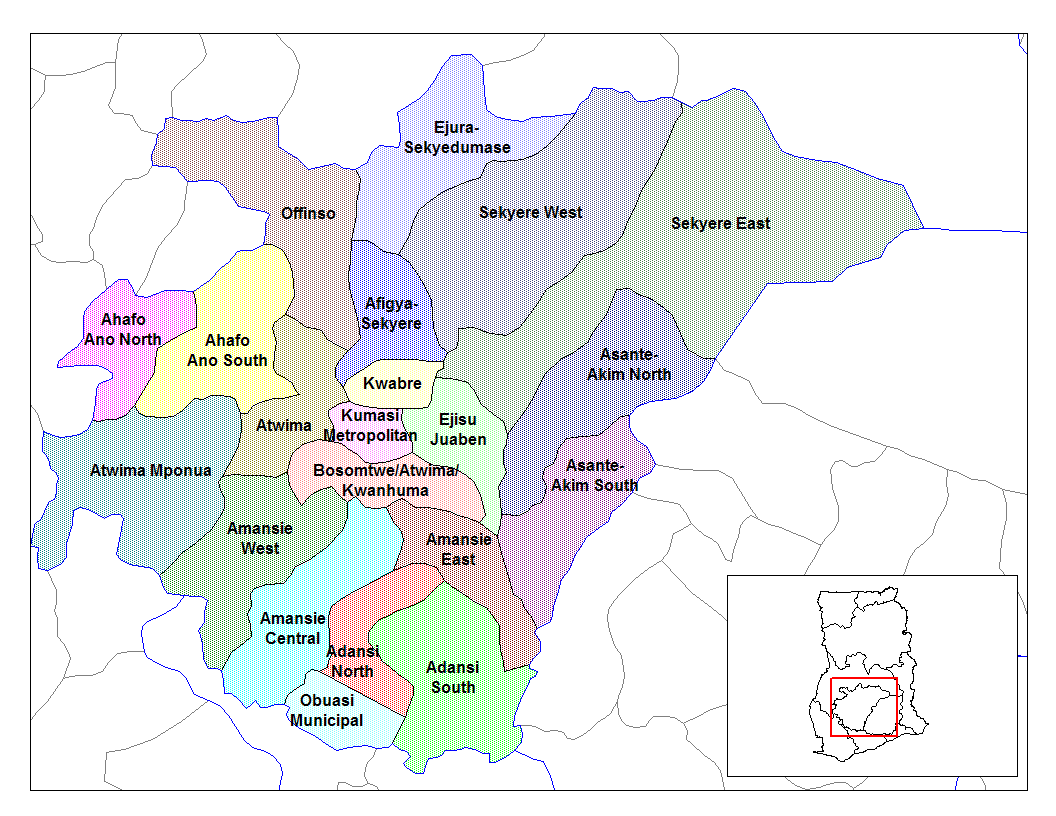
- Districts of Ashanti Region

- Location of Ahafo Ano South District within Ashanti
- Coordinates: 6°49′N 1°52′W
- Country: Ghana
- Region: Ashanti
- Capital: Mankranso

Government
  - District Executive: Kwaku Obeng Boateng

Area
  - Total: 1,126 km^{2} (435 sq mi)

Population (2010)
  - Total: 121,659
- Time zone: UTC+0 (GMT)

Ahafo Ano South District is a former district that was located in Ashanti Region, Ghana. Originally created as an ordinary district assembly in 1988, which was created from the former Ahafo Ano District Council. However, on 15 March 2018, it was split off into two new districts: Ahafo Ano South West District (capital: Mankranso) and Ahafo Ano South East District (capital: Adugyama). The district assembly was located in the western part of Ashanti Region and had Mankranso as its capital town.

== Demographics ==
As of the 2010 Ghana Population Census, Ahafo Ano South had a population of 121,659.

== Notable residents ==
- Hon. Joseph Agyemang Dapaah, District Chief Executive

== See also ==
- Ahafo Ano South West District Assembly Official Website
