= Asiwa =

- District Capital
- Location in Ghana
- Coordinates: 6°25′N 1°20′W
- Country: Ghana
- Region: Ashanti Region
- District: Bosome Freho District
- Elevation: 630 ft (192 m)

Asiwa is a small town and is the capital of Bosome Freho, a district in the Ashanti Region of Ghana.

Asiwa derives its name from activities of a settler from Kokofu. He nursed and planted cocoa seedlings for sale. Cocoa seedling is called NSIWAA. When people went there to buy cocoa nsiwaa (seedlings) they said they were going to Nsiwaa. This later changed to ASIWA. A new Guest house has been built. It is called PAKAS LODGE. There is a multipurpose hall for workshops and conferences. A recreational centre to be called E. W. ANANE Recreational Centre is also being built near the lodge. A new District Assembly Building has been inaugurated since 2016.

Asiwa has seen infrastructural developments, including the construction of Pakas Lodge, a guest house featuring a multipurpose hall for workshops and conferences. Additionally, the E. W. Anane Recreational Centre is under development near the lodge. A new District Assembly Building was inaugurated in 2016.

The town is part of the Bosome Freho District, which covers an area of approximately 577.3 square kilometers. As of 2021, the district had a population of 62,259.

== School ==
Bosome Senior High Technical School
