= Kwafokrom (Eastern Region) =

Town in Eastern Region, Ghana

Kwafokrom Kwafokurom
- Town
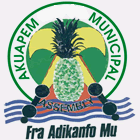
- Akuapim South Municipal District logo

- Location of Kwafokrom in Eastern Region, Ghana
- Coordinates: 05°51′50″N 00°21′47″W
- Country: Ghana
- Region: Eastern Region
- District: Nsawam-Adoagyire Municipal
- Time zone: GMT
  - Summer (DST): GMT

Kwafokrom is a town near Nsawam in the Eastern Region of Ghana. In October 2018, Kwasi Amoako-Attah cut the sod for the dualisation of the Kwafokrom–Apedwa section of the Accra-Kumasi highway. In May 2026, an armed robbery incident took place at the Kwafokrom Goil Filling Station.
