= Old Tafo =

Old Tafo Akyem
- Town
- Location of Old Tafo in Eastern Region
- Coordinates: 6°14′N 0°24′W
- Country: Ghana
- Region: Eastern Region
- District: Abuakwa North Municipal
- Elevation: 679 ft (207 m)
- Time zone: GMT
  - Summer (DST): GMT

Old Tafo is the oldest town in the Akyem Abuakwa Traditional area in the Abuakwa North Municipality in the Eastern Region of south Ghana. It is the home of the famous Ohum Festival, the only festival widely celebrated by the people of Akyem Abuakwa. It houses the Ohum dua, an over 500-year-old spiritual tree that does not wither; and the Ohum shrine where the mighty deity Agyempremu Kofi resides. Old Tafo shares border with New Tafo where the Cocoa Research Institute of Ghana (CRIG) is located. It also shares a border with Osiem, where the Faith Church (Gyidi Asore) founded by Opanin Samuel Brako is located.

== Education ==
Old Tafo is known for WBM Zion Secondary School School. The school is a second cycle institution. WMB Zion Secondary School.
