= Amansie South District =

- District
- Districts of Ashanti Region

- Location of Amansie South District within Ashanti
- Coordinates: 6°24′N 1°56′W
- Country: Ghana
- Region: Ashanti
- Capital: Manso Adubia

Government
  - District Chief Executive: Clement Opoku Gyamfi

Area
  - Total: 773.5 km^{2} (298.7 sq mi)

Population (2021 Census)
  - Total: 116,366
  - Density: 150.4/km^{2} (389.6/sq mi)
- Time zone: UTC+0 (GMT)

Amansie South District is one of the forty-three districts in Ashanti Region, Ghana. Originally it was formerly part of the then-larger Amansie West District in 1988, after it was split from the former Amansie District Council. On 15 March 2018, the southern part of the district was split off to create Amansie South District; thus the remaining part has been retained as Amansie West District. The district assembly is located in the southern part of Ashanti Region and has Manso Adubia as its capital town.

== Sources ==
- "Districts of Ghana". Statoids.
