= Obuasi East District =

- District
- Districts of Ashanti Region

- Location of Obuasi East District within Ashanti
- Coordinates: 6°12′N 1°41′W
- Country: Ghana
- Region: Ashanti
- Capital: Tutuka

Area
  - Total: 96.42 km^{2} (37.23 sq mi)

Population (2021)
  - Total: 92,401
  - Density: 958.3/km^{2} (2,482/sq mi)
- Time zone: UTC+0 (GMT)

Obuasi East District is one of the forty-three districts in Ashanti Region, Ghana. Originally it was formerly part of the then-larger Obuasi Municipal District on 17 February 2004; until part of the district was split off to create Obuasi East District on 15 March 2018; thus the remaining part has been retained as Obuasi Municipal District. The district assembly is the southern part of Ashanti Region and has Tutuka as its capital town.

== Sources ==
- "Obuasi Municipal District". Statoids.
- GhanaDistricts.com
