= Agona =

Town in Ashanti Region, Ghana

- Location in Ghana
- Coordinates: 6°47′N 1°36′W
- Country: Ghana
- Region: Ashanti Region
- District: Sekyere South District

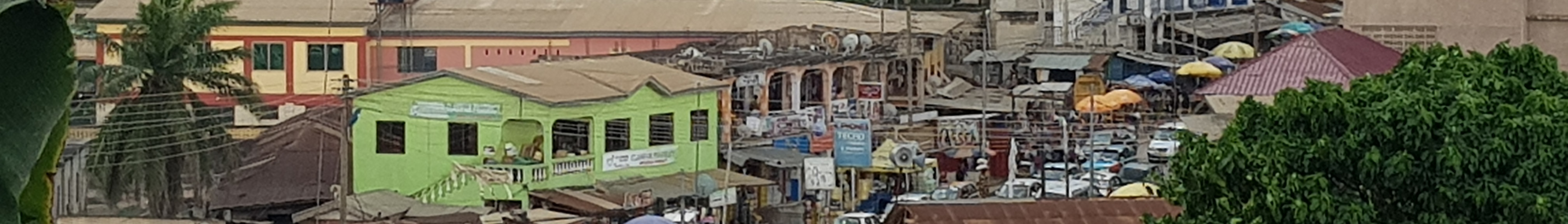
Agona page banner

Agona is a small town in Ghana. It is the capital of Sekyere South District. It is located about 40 km from Kumasi.

== See also ==
- Akyempem Festival
