= Ahafo Ano North Municipal District =

Municipal District in Ashanti Region, Ghana

- Municipal District
- Districts of Ashanti Region

- Location of Ahafo Ano North Municipal District within Ashanti
- Coordinates: 7°0′N 2°10′W
- Country: Ghana
- Region: Ashanti
- Capital: Tepa

Government
  - Municipal Chief Executive: Hon. Martina Appiah - Nyantakyi

Area
  - Total: 593 km^{2} (229 sq mi)

Population (2021 Census)
  - Total: 92,742
  - Density: 156/km^{2} (405/sq mi)
- Time zone: UTC+0 (GMT)

Ahafo Ano North Municipal District is one of the forty-three districts in Ashanti Region, Ghana. Originally created as an ordinary district assembly in 1988 as Ahafo Ano North District, which was created from the former Ahafo Ano District Council; until it was elevated to municipal district assembly status to become Ahafo Ano North Municipal District in November 2017 (effectively 15 March 2018). The municipality is located in the western part of Ashanti Region and has Tepa as its capital town.

== Geography ==
Ahafo Ano North Municipal District is mostly based on rainforests.

== Economy ==
About 85% of the working population are farmers and it is one of the most important cocoa growing districts of Ghana.

== Health ==
The municipal has only one major health facility, the District Hospital at Tepa, and four smaller health service stations. There is little proper sanitation.

== Transport ==
Like much of Ghana, the roads here are largely untarred (with the exception of the main road).

== Sources ==
- "Districts of Ghana". Statoids.
- GhanaDistricts.com
