= District Chief Executive =

Appointed public servant who heads a district in Ghana

A District Chief Executive (DCE) is an appointed public servant who heads a district in Ghana. It is an official and nationally recognized position and is similar to that of a mayor of a city in other countries. The responsibilities and duties of a district chief executive are enshrined in the Constitution of Ghana. There are 216 districts in Ghana with some being municipal and other metropolis.

== Article 213 – District Chief Executive ==
(1) There shall be a District Chief Executive for every district who shall be appointed by the President with the prior approval of not less than two-thirds majority of members of the Assembly present and voting at the meeting.

(2) The District Chief Executive shall:

- (a) preside at meetings of the Executive Committee of the Assembly;
- (b) be responsible for the day-to-day performance of the executive and administrative functions of the District Assembly; and
- (c) be the chief representative of the Central Government in the district.

(3) The office of District Chief Executive shall become vacant if:

- (a) a vote of no confidence, supported by the votes of not less than two-thirds of all the members of the District Assembly, is passed against him; or
- (b) he is removed from office by the President; or
- (c) he resigns or dies.

== DCEs Role & Qualities ==
The person appointed District Chief Executive is:

- The Chairperson of the Executive Committee of the Assembly.
- The 'manager' of the Assembly as a body corporate that can sue and be sued and that can own and dispose of property.
- The chief representative of the Central Government in the district.
- The Chairperson of the District Security Committee.
- The representative of Ministers of decentralized Departments in the districts.

== Qualities of the District Chief Executive. ==
A person being considered for appointment as District Chief Executive should possess the following qualities:

- Be answerable and responsive to the needs of the people.
- Be competent in executing the policies and vision of the current President.
- Demonstrate efficiency and effectiveness in driving development at the local level.
- Be skilled at engaging and encouraging community members to actively take part in district governance and development initiatives.
- Have the ability to ensure the District Assembly operates smoothly and is well-managed.

== Criteria for the selection of candidates for appointment as District Chief Executives. ==
A person considered for the role of District Chief Executive should meet some or all of the following criteria:

- (a) Ideally, the candidate should hold at least a first degree.
- (b) The individual must have a strong connection to the district, such as:
  - Being a native of the district,
  - Having lived in the district for an extended period,
  - Being well-acquainted with the district's issues and challenges,
  - Or having a demonstrable association or identification with the district.
- (c) The candidate should, at minimum, be sympathetic to the ruling political party and support the current President’s political vision.
- (d) A background in development work or public service is essential.
- (e) The person should possess relevant work experience in either the public or private sector.
- (f) Management experience or skills are desirable.
- (g) A history of humanitarian efforts and advocacy for the underprivileged is important.
- (h) Female candidates should be prioritized to promote gender equality and affirmative action.
