= Effiduase-Asokore (Ghana parliament constituency) =

Constituency in Ghana

- constituency for the Parliament of Ghana
- District: Sekyere East District
- Region: Ashanti Region of Ghana

Current constituency
- Party: New Patriotic Party
- MP: Nana Ayew Afriye

Effiduase-Asokore is one of the constituencies represented in the Parliament of Ghana. It elects one Member of Parliament (MP) by the first past the post system of election. Effiduase-Asokore is located in the Sekyere East District of the Ashanti Region of Ghana.

The constituency is currently under the leadership of Dr. Nana Ayew Afriyie of the New Patriotic Party.

== Boundaries ==
The seat is located within the Sekyere East District of the Ashanti Region of Ghana.

== Members of Parliament ==
Election	Member	Party	Ref
1992			
1996	Mrs. Grace Coleman	New Patriotic Party	
2008	Frank Boakye Agyen	New Patriotic Party	
2012	Frank Boakye Agyen	New Patriotic Party	
2016	Dr. Nana Ayew Afriye	New Patriotic Party	
2020	Dr. Nana Ayew Afriyie	New Patriotic Party	
2024	Dr. Nana Ayew Afriyie	New Patriotic Party	

== Elections ==
2008 Ghanaian parliamentary election: Effiduase-Asokore Source: Ghana Home Page
Party	Candidate	Votes	%	±%
New Patriotic Party	Frank Boakye Agyen	18,859	79.2	—
National Democratic Congress	Kwadwo Adae	4,456	18.7	—
Convention People's Party	George Asiamah	316	1.3	—
People's National Convention	Lovia Berkoh	168	0.7	—
Majority		16,403	60.5	—
Turnout				

== See also ==
- List of Ghana Parliament constituencies
