= Bosome Freho District =

Bosome-Freho District
- District
- Districts of Ashanti Region

- Location of Bosome-Freho District within Ashanti
- Coordinates: 6°25′N 1°20′W
- Country: Ghana
- Region: Ashanti
- Capital: Asiwa

Government
  - District Executive: Yaw Danso (former Constituency Organiser-NPP)
  - Succeeded: Hon. Kwame Adarkwa; Hon. Gabrieal Yaw Amoah

Area
  - Total: 577.3 km^{2} (222.9 sq mi)

Population (2021)
  - Total: 62,259
  - Density: 107.8/km^{2} (279.3/sq mi)
- Time zone: UTC+0 (GMT)
- ISO 3166 code: GH-AS-BF

Bosome Freho District is one of the forty-three districts in Ashanti Region, Ghana. Originally it was formerly part of the then-larger Amansie East District in 2004; until the eastern part of the district was split off by a decree of president John Agyekum Kufuor on 29 February 2008 to create Bosome Freho District; thus the remaining part has been renamed as Bekwai Municipal District while it was elevated to municipal district assembly status on that same year. The district assembly is located in the southern part of Ashanti Region and has Asiwa as its capital town.

== Places of interest ==
There is a high school, Bosome Senior High Technical School, a district magistrate court at Asiwa, Asiwa Health Centre and a police station. There is also a budget hotel, Pakas Lodge with a restaurant.

== Sources ==
- "Districts of Ghana". Statoids.
- GhanaDistricts.com
- Ghana Statistical Service
