= Sekyere Afram Plains District =

- District
- Districts of Ashanti Region

- Location of Sekyere Afram Plain District within Ashanti
- Coordinates: 7°10′N 0°46′W
- Country: Ghana
- Region: Ashanti
- Capital: Dobronso

Government
  - District Chief Executive: Hon. Jacob Kofi Dankwah
  - Succeeded: Hon. Philip Basoah

Area
  - Total: 2,411 km^{2} (931 sq mi)

Population (2021 Census)
  - Total: 32,640
  - Density: 13.54/km^{2} (35.06/sq mi)
- Time zone: UTC+0 (GMT)

Sekyere Afram Plains District is one of the forty-three districts in Ashanti Region, Ghana. Originally it was formerly part of the then-larger Sekyere East District, which was created from the former Sekyere District Council. Later, a large portion of the district was split off to create the 1st Sekyere Afram Plains District on 1 November 2007 (effectively 29 February 2008), with Kumawu as its capital town. However, on 28 June 2012, the Afram Plains area of the district was split off to create the new Sekyere Afram Plains District, with Dobrosno as its capital town; while the remaining part has since then been officially renamed as Sekyere Kumawu District, with Kumawu as its capital town. The district assembly is located in the eastern part of Ashanti Region and has Drobosno as its capital town.

== Sources ==
- "Districts of Ghana". Statoids.
- GhanaDistricts.com
