= Bekwai Municipal Assembly =

- Municipal District
- Districts of Ashanti Region

- Location of Bekwai Municipal District in Ashanti
- Coordinates: 6°26′55.16″N 1°34′34.86″W
- Country: Ghana
- Region: Ashanti
- Capital: Bekwai

Government
  - Municipal Chief Executive: Kwaku Kyei Baffour

Area
  - Total: 1,937 km^{2} (748 sq mi)

Population (2021 Census)
  - Total: 137,967
  - Density: 71.23/km^{2} (184.5/sq mi)
- Time zone: UTC+0 (GMT)

Bekwai Municipal Assembly is one of the forty-three districts in Ashanti Region, Ghana. Originally created as an ordinary district assembly in 1988 when it was known as Amansie East District, which was created from the former Amansie District Council. Later, the western part of the district was split off by a decree of president John Agyekum Kufuor on 12 November 2003 (effectively 18 February 2004) to create Amansie Central District. The remaining part was retained until early 2008 as Amansie East District. Then the eastern part of the district was split off to create Bosome Freho District on 29 February 2008; while the remaining part was elevated to municipal district assembly status the same year and has since been renamed as Bekwai Municipal Assembly. The municipality is located in the southern part of Ashanti Region and has Bekwai as its capital town.

== Footnotes ==
- ^1 before the split off of the Amansie Central District.

== Sources ==
- "Districts of Ghana". Statoids.
- GhanaDistricts.com
- 19 New Districts Created , GhanaWeb, November 20, 2003.
