= Effiduase =

- Town and District Capital
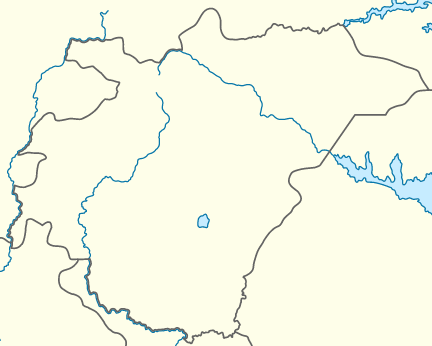
- Location of Mampong within Ashanti
- Coordinates: 6°50′33.36″N 1°23′51.69″W
- Sovereign state: Ghana
- Region: Ashanti
- District: Sekyere East

Government
  - Chief: Nana Adu Ameyaw II
- Time zone: GMT
  - Summer (DST): GMT

Effiduase is a town and is the capital of Sekyere East, a district in the Ashanti Region of Ghana. The Effiduase is known for the Effiduase Secondary Commercial School now Effiduase Senior High School and effiduasi senior high technical school. The Effiduase Secondary Commercial School is a second cycle institution. The Effiduase chief is Nana Adu Ameyaw II, Chief of the Ashanti sub-traditional council. Effiduase is made up of mostly traders. Effiduase is the district capital of Skyere East District. Effiduase houses the biggest hospital in its Sekyere East district.
