= Mankranso =

- District Capital
- Location in Ghana
- Coordinates: 6°49′N 1°52′W
- Country: Ghana
- Region: Central Region
- District: Ahafo Ano South District
- Elevation: 682 ft (208 m)

Mankranso is a small town and is the capital of Ahafo Ano South- West, a district in the Central Region of Ghana.
