= Kumawu =

- District Capital
- Location in Ghana
- Coordinates: 6°55′N 1°17′W
- Country: Ghana
- Region: Ashanti Region
- District: Sekyere Kumawu District
- Elevation: 1,401 ft (427 m)

Kumawu is a small town and is the capital of Sekyere Kumawu, a district in the Ashanti Region of Ghana. The town is known for the Tweneboa Kodua Secondary School. The school is a second cycle institution.

== Demography ==
The population of Sekyere Kumawu district, according to the 2010 Population and Housing Census, is 65,402. Females constitute 52.6 percent and males represent 47.4 percent. More than half (52.8%) of the population is rural.

== Agriculture ==
As high as 81.8 percent of households in the Sekyere Kumawu district are engaged in agriculture. Most households in the district are involved in crop farming. Some of the most important crops grown in this area include yam, maize, plantain, and rice. Among agricultural households, 34.3 percent are into rearing of livestock. Poultry (chicken) is the dominant animal reared in the district, followed by goats, sheep, turkey, and pig.

== Attractions ==
Bomfobiri wildlife sanctuary, created in 1975, covers a total area of 53 km^{2} consisting of remnant semi-deciduous forest and savannah. It is found in the Kumawu Traditional Area, 67 km North-West of Kumasi. Three types of crocodiles are present as well as four species of monkeys, duikers and bush pigs. The rich bird life includes the rare bareheaded rock fowl, once Ghana's most famous bird. A major attraction is the Bomfobiri Falls.

Another tourist attraction located in Sekyere Kumawu district is the Kumawu Palace Museum, opened in 2015 by NYU Africa House and Center for Technology and Economic Development (CTED).
