= Sekyere East District =

Sekyere East District Assembly
- District
- Districts of Ashanti Region

- Location of Atwima Nwabiagya Municipal District within Ashanti
- Coordinates: 6°50′33.36″N 1°23′51.69″W
- Country: Ghana
- Region: Ashanti
- Capital: Effiduase

Government
  - District Executive: Alhaji Nuhu Rahmadan

Area
  - Total: 4,516 km^{2} (1,744 sq mi)

Population (2021)
  - Total: 74,789
  - Density: 16.56/km^{2} (42.89/sq mi)
- Time zone: UTC+0 (GMT)

Sekyere East District is one of the forty-three districts in Ashanti Region, Ghana. Originally created as an ordinary district assembly in 1988, which was created from the former Sekyere District Council. Later, the eastern part of the district was split off to create the 1st Sekyere Afram Plains District on 1 November 2007 (effectively 29 February 2008), with Kumawu as its capital town. However, on 28 June 2012, the Afram Plains area of the district was split off to create the new Sekyere Afram Plains District, with Dobrosno as its capital town; while the remaining part has since then been officially renamed as Sekyere Kumawu District, with Kumawu as its capital town. The district assembly is located in the eastern part of Ashanti Region and has Effiduase as its capital town.

== Sources ==
- "Districts of Ghana". Statoids.
- GhanaDistricts.com
