= Ashanti Region =

Region of Ghana

Ashanti
- Region
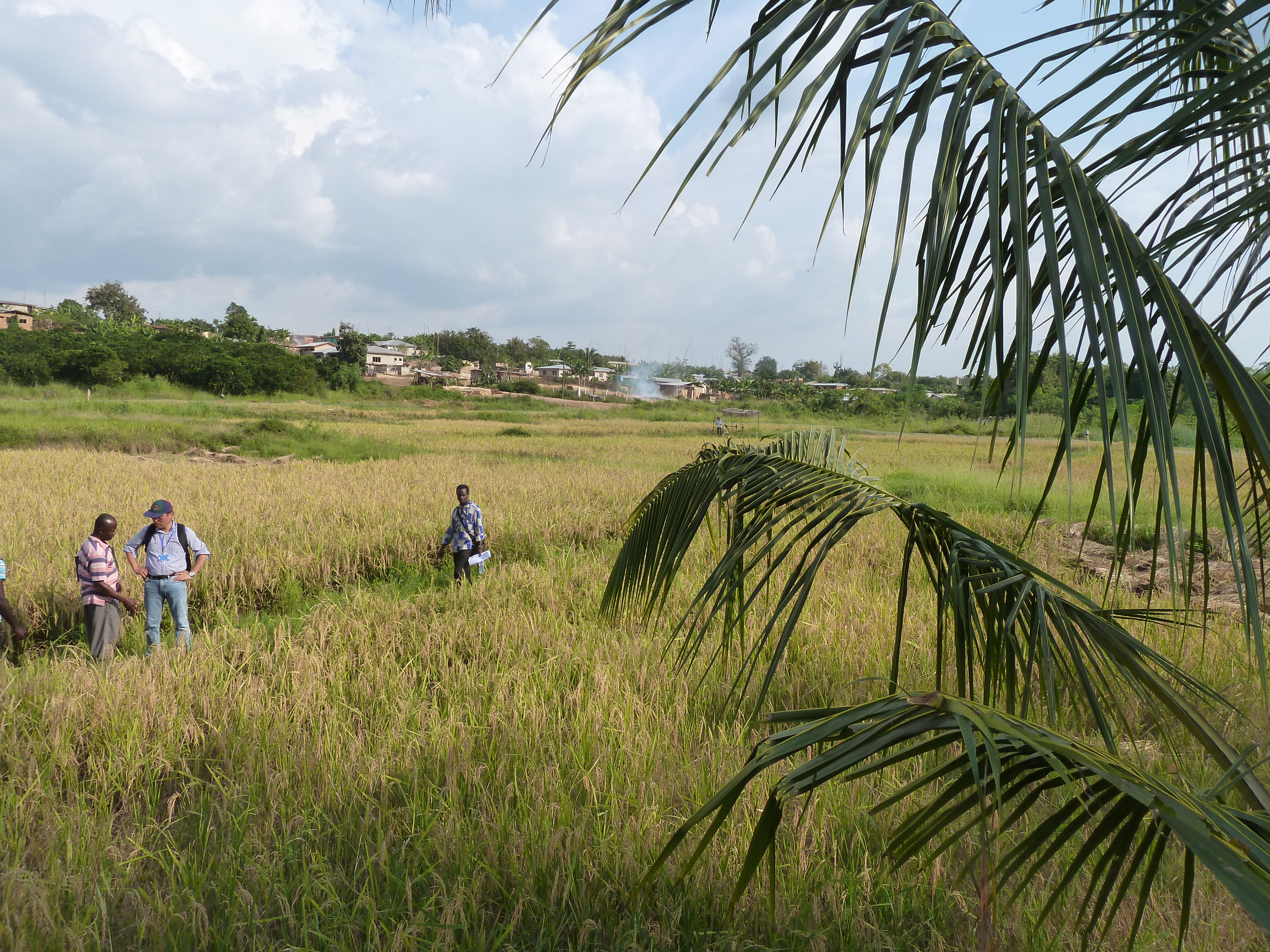
- Sawah rice cultivation in inland valleys in Ashanti region, Ghana

- Location of Ashanti Region in Ghana
- Coordinates: 6°45′N 1°30′W
- Country: Ghana
- Capital: Kumasi
- Districts: 27

Government
  - Regional Minister: Frank Amoakohene
  - Asantehene: Osei Tutu II

Area
  - Total: 24,389 km^{2} (9,417 sq mi)
  - Rank: Ranked 3rd

Population (2021 Census)
  - Total: 5,440,463
  - Rank: Ranked 1st
  - Density: 223.07/km^{2} (577.75/sq mi)

GDP (PPP)
  - Year: 2013
  - Per capita: $5,150

GDP (Nominal)
  - Year: 2013
  - Per capita: $2,500
- Time zone: GMT
- Area code: 032
- ISO 3166 code: GH-AH
- HDI (2022): ▲0.641 medium · 3rd

The Ashanti Region is located in the southern part of Ghana and is the third largest of 16 administrative regions, occupying a total land surface of 24,389 km^{2} (9,417 sq mi) and making up 10.2% of the total land area of Ghana. It is the most populated region in Ghana, with a population of 5,440,463 according to the 2021 census, accounting for around one-sixth of Ghana's total population. The Ashanti Region is known for its gold bar and cocoa production. The largest city and capital of Ashanti is Kumasi.

== Geography ==
The Ashanti Region is located in the middle belt of Ghana. It lies between longitudes 0.15W and 2.25W, and latitudes 5.50N and 7.46N. The region shares boundaries with six of the sixteen political regions: the Bono, Bono East, and Ahafo in the north, the Eastern Region in the east, the Central Region in the south, and the Western Region in the South west. The region is divided into 43 districts, each headed by a District Chief Executive.

== Economy ==
The economy of the Ashanti Region is largely self-sufficient, dominated by the service sector, agriculture sector, and by natural resources. The region is also known for its production of manganese, bauxite and agricultural commodities such as cocoa and yam, with the region having lower levels of taxation and with less need for foreign direct investment.

== Demographics ==
The center of population in the Ashanti Region is located in the Kumasi Metropolitan District. According to the 2000 census, the region had a population of 3,612,950, making it the most populous region of Ghana; its density (148.1 per square 1 km (0.62 mi)) is lower than that of the Central Region (162.2/km^{2}). The majority of the Ashanti Region's population is from the Akan ethnic group and is made up of citizens by birth (94.2%), whereas 5% are naturalized Ghanaians. A smaller proportion (5.8%) of the population originates from outside Ashanti, Akanland, or Ghana; 3.7% of the population of Ashanti was from one of the five English-speaking countries of ECOWAS and 2.1% was from other countries in Africa. The non-African population living in the region is 1.8% of the total population. Akans are the predominant ethnic group in the region, representing 94.2% of citizens by birth. The dominant proportion (82.9%) of the Akan population is Ashanti.

== Transport ==
The N6 is connected to Kumasi, Nsawam, the N4, and Accra via Kwame Nkrumah Circle. Ashanti is also connected to the Central Region by the N8 and N10, both of which originate from Yamoransa in the Central Region. The N10 is also connected to Kumasi.

== Education ==
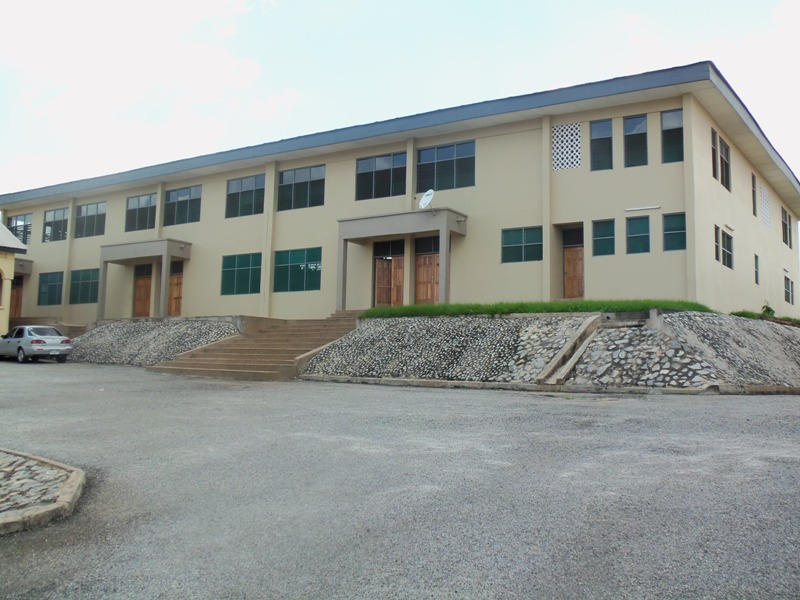
Anglican Secondary School, Kumasi

=== Higher education ===
The Ashanti region has three public universities. In addition, there are private universities and colleges, which are spread throughout the region.

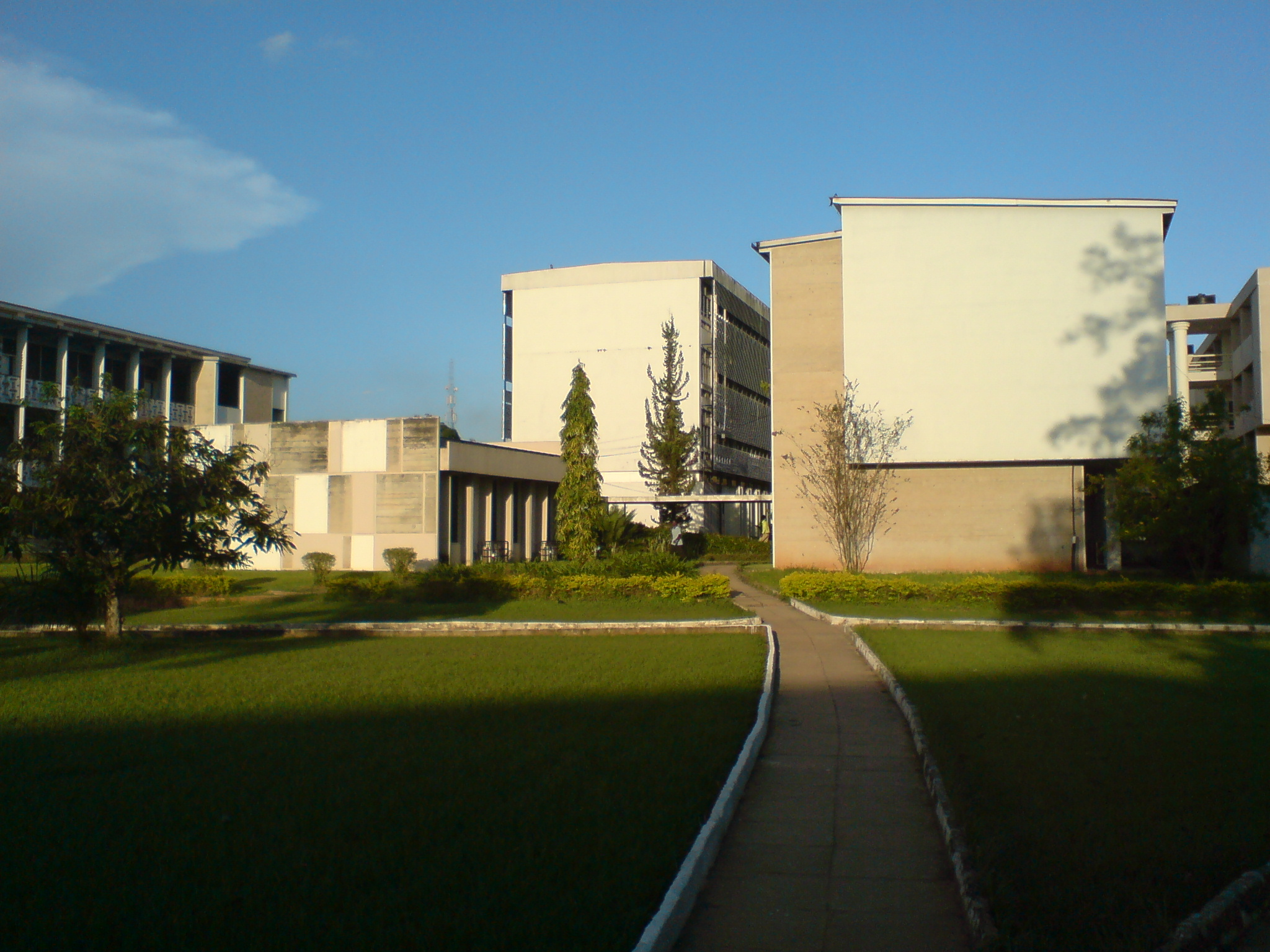
Kwame Nkrumah University of Science and Technology

== Healthcare ==
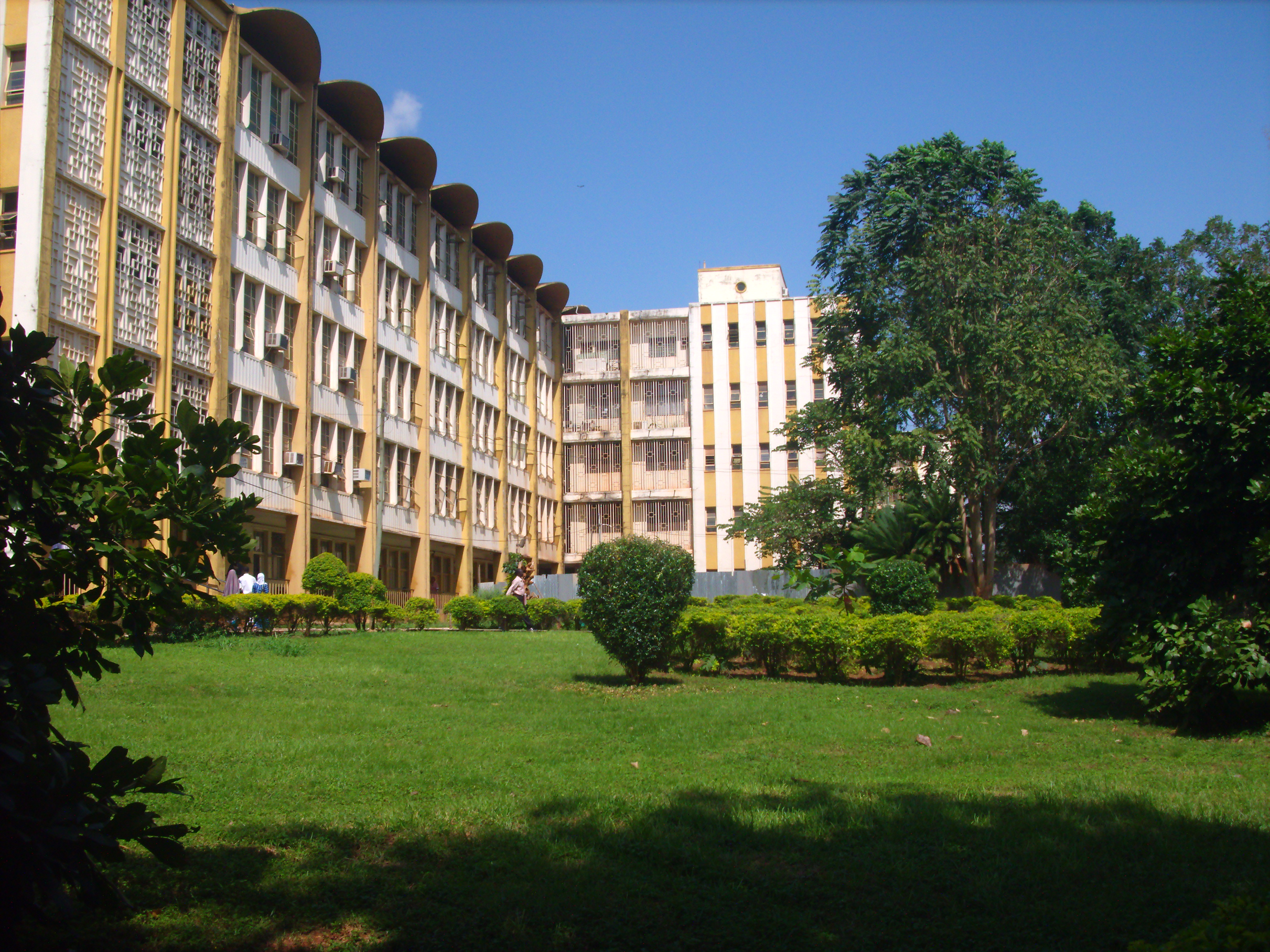
Komfo Anokye Teaching Hospital

Healthcare in the region is managed by the Ashanti Regional Health Directorate (RHD), which is headed by Dr. Emmanuel Tinkorang. Under the agency there are 43 smaller district health directorates managed by their respective district.

There are about 1,654 health facilities in the region, mostly consisting of CHPS facilities (Note: CHPS hospitals are a national technique to help provide essential health services to communities who lack access to proper health care.) and health centers. This is a list of some hospitals in the Ashanti Region:

- Manhyia Hospital
- Kwadaso SDA Hospital
- Komfo Anokye Teaching Hospital
- Kwame Nkrumah University of Science and Technology Hospital
- Kumasi South Hospital
- First Care Hospital
- Tafo Government Hospital
- Suntreso Government Hospital
- West End Hospital

== Administrative divisions ==
The Ashanti Region is administered by a local government. Under its administrative system, the region is divided into 43 MMDAs (made up of one metropolitan, 18 municipal and 24 ordinary assemblies). Each district, municipal, or metropolitan assembly is administered by a chief executive and member of parliament representing the central government, and deriving authority from an assembly headed by a presiding member elected by the other members of the assembly. Afterwards, the MMDAs were increased from 10 to 18 in 1988; from 18 to 21 in 2004; from 21 to 27 in 2008; from 27 to 30 in 2012; and from 30 to 43 in 2018. The current list of members of parliament is as follows:

Map of all the districts in the Ashanti Region

Administrative divisions of Ashanti Region
District	Capital	Constituency	Member of Parliament	Party
Adansi Asokwa	Adansi Asokwa	Adansi-Asokwa	Kobina Tahir Hammond	NPP
Adansi North	Fomena	Fomena	Andrew Asiamah Amoako (second deputy speaker)	IND
Adansi South	New Edubiase	New Edubease	Adams Abdul Salam	NDC
Afigya Kwabre North	Boamang	Afigya Kwabre North	Collins Adomako-Mensah	NPP
Afigya Kwabre South	Kodie	Afigya Kwabre South	William Owuraku Aidoo	NPP
Ahafo Ano North Municipal	Tepa	Ahafo Ano North	Suleman Adamu Sanid	NPP
Ahafo Ano South East	Dwinyame / Adugyama	Ahafo Ano South East	Francis Manu-Adoabor	NPP
Ahafo Ano South West	Mankranso	Ahafo Ano South West	Kwaku Adu Johnson	NPP
Akrofuom	Akrofuom	Akrofuom	Alex Blankson	NPP
Amansie Central	Jacobu	Odotobri	Emmanuel Akwasi Gyamfi	NPP
Amansie West	Manso Nkwanta	Manso Nkwanta	George Kwabena Obeng Takyi	NPP
Amansie South	Manso Adubia	Manso Edubia	Frimpong Yaw Addo	NPP
Asante Akim Central Municipal	Konongo	Asante Akim Central	Kwame Anyimadu - Antwi	NPP
Asante Akim North	Agogo	Asante Akim North	Andy Kwame Appiah-Kubi	NPP
Asante Akim South Municipal	Juaso	Asante Akim South	Kwaku Asante-Boateng	NPP
Asokore Mampong	Asokore Mampong	Asawase	Muntaka Mohammed Mubarak (minority chief whip)	NDC
Asokwa Municipal	Asokwa	Asokwa	Patricia Appiagyei	NPP
Atwima Kwanwoma	Twedie	Atwima-Kwanwoma	Kofi Amankwa-Manu	NPP
Atwima Mponua	Nyinahin	Atwima Mponua	Isaac Kwame Asiamah	NPP
Atwima Nwabiagya Municipal	Nkawie	Atwima-Nwabiagya South	Benito Owusu Bio	NPP
Atwima Nwabiagya North	Barekese	Atwima-Nwabiagya North	Emmanuel Adjei Anhwere	NPP
Bekwai Municipal	Bekwai	Bekwai	Joseph Osei-Owusu (first deputy speaker)	NPP
Bosome Freho	Asiwa	Bosome-Freho	Akwasi Darko Boateng	NPP
Bosomtwe	Kuntanse	Bosomtwe	Yaw Osei Adutwum	NPP
Ejisu Municipal	Ejisu	Ejisu	John Ampotuah Kumah	NPP
Ejura Sekyedumase Municipal	Ejura	Ejura-Sekyedumase	Muhammad Bawah Braimah	NDC
Juaben Municipal	Juaben	Juaben	Ama Pomaa Boateng	NPP
Kumasi Metropolitan (KMA)	Kumasi	Bantama	Francis Asenso -Boakye	NPP
Kumasi Metropolitan (KMA)	Kumasi	Manhyia North	Akwasi Konadu	NPP
Kumasi Metropolitan (KMA)	Kumasi	Manhyia South	Matthew Opoku Prempeh	NPP
Kumasi Metropolitan (KMA)	Kumasi	Nhyiaeso	Stephen Amoah	NPP
Kumasi Metropolitan (KMA)	Kumasi	Subin	Eugene Boakye Antwi	NPP
Kwabre East Municipal	Mamponteng	Kwabre East	Francisca Oteng Mensah	NPP
Kwadaso Municipal	Kwadaso	Kwadaso	Kingsley Nyarko	NPP
Mampong Municipal	Mampong	Mampong	Kwaku Ampratwum-Sarpong	NPP
Obuasi East Municipal	Tutuka	Obuasi East	Patrick Boakye-Yiadom	NPP
Obuasi Municipal	Obuasi	Obuasi West	Kwaku Agyemang Kwarteng	NPP
Offinso Municipal	Offinso	Offinso South	Augustine Collins Ntim	NPP
Offinso North	Akomadan	Offinso North	Isaac Yaw Opoku	NPP
Oforikrom Municipal	Oforikrom	Oforikrom	Emmanuel Marfo	NPP
Old Tafo Municipal	Old Tafo	Old Tafo	Vincent Ekow Assafuah	NPP
Sekyere Afram Plains	Drobonso	Sekyere Afram Plains	Alex Adomako-Mensah	NDC
Sekyere Central	Nsuta	Nsuta-Kwamang-Beposo	Adelaide Ntim	NPP
Sekyere East	Effiduase	Afigya Sekyere East	Mavis Nkansah Boadu	NPP
Sekyere Kumawu	Kumawu	Kumawu	Philip Basoah	NPP
Sekyere South	Agona	Effiduase-Asokore	Nana Ayew Afriyie	NPP
Suame Municipal	Suame	Suame	Osei Kyei Mensah Bonsu (majority leader)	NPP
