= List of ecological tourist sites in Ghana =

These are the list of ecotourist sites in Ghana. Some are well developed, while others are not.

== Ashanti region ==
- Adanwomase Kente weaving
- Ahwiaa wood carvings
- Bobiri Butterfly sanctuary
- Ntonso Adinkra Arts and crafts village
- Bonwire Kente Weaving
- Lake Bosumtwi
- Kumasi Zoo
- Pankrono pottery
- Kejetia Market

== Brong Ahafo region ==
- Mim bour
- Mim Lake
- Kintampo Waterfalls
- Asumura
- Boabeng-Fiema Monkey Sanctuary
- Buoyem
- Tanoboase Sacred Grove and Shrine

== Central Region ==
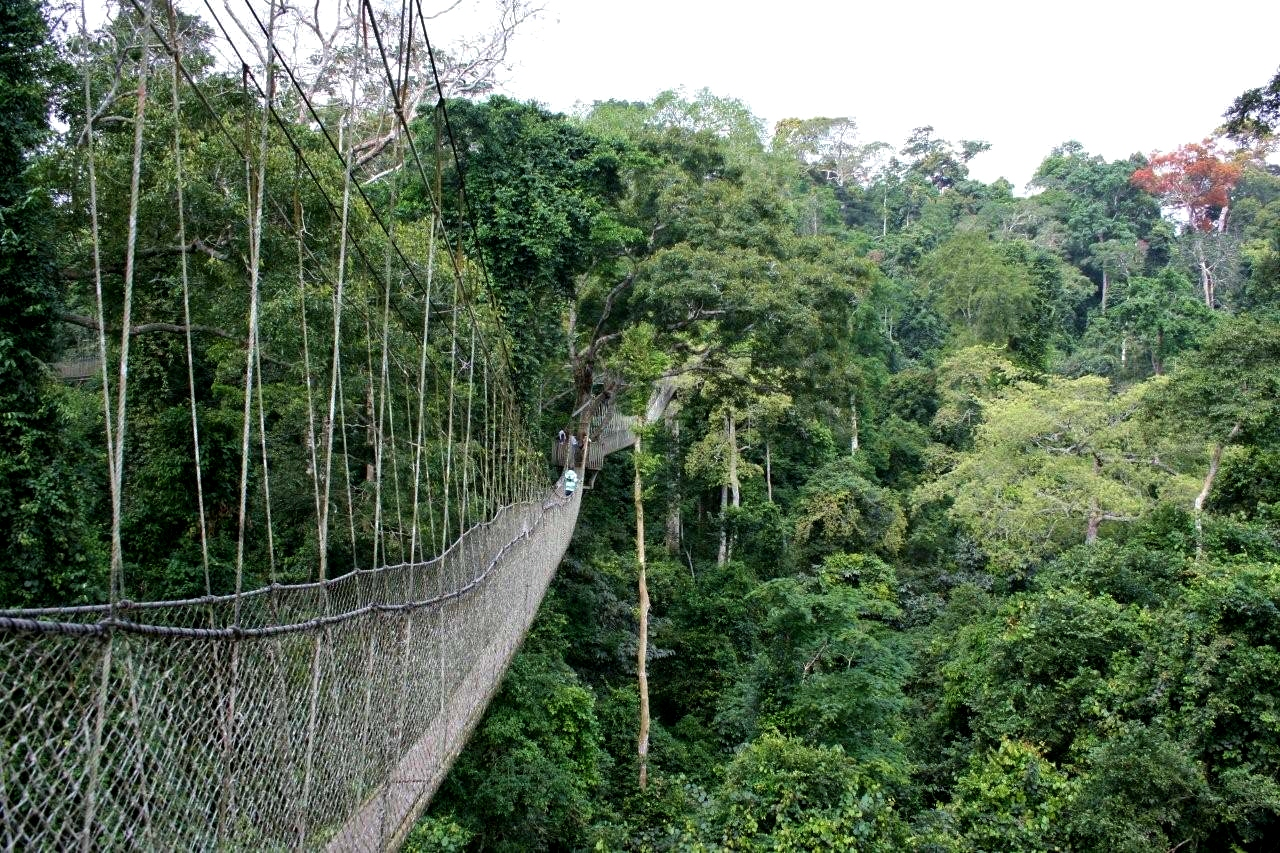
The canopy walk at Kakum National Park

- Kakum National Park

== Eastern region ==
- Adjeikrom
- Afram Plains
- Akim Abompe
- Tini Waterfall
- Boti Waterfall
- Bunso Aboretum
- Kutunse earth satellite

== Greater Accra region ==
- Shai Hills
- Chenku water falls
- Labadi Beach

== Northern region ==
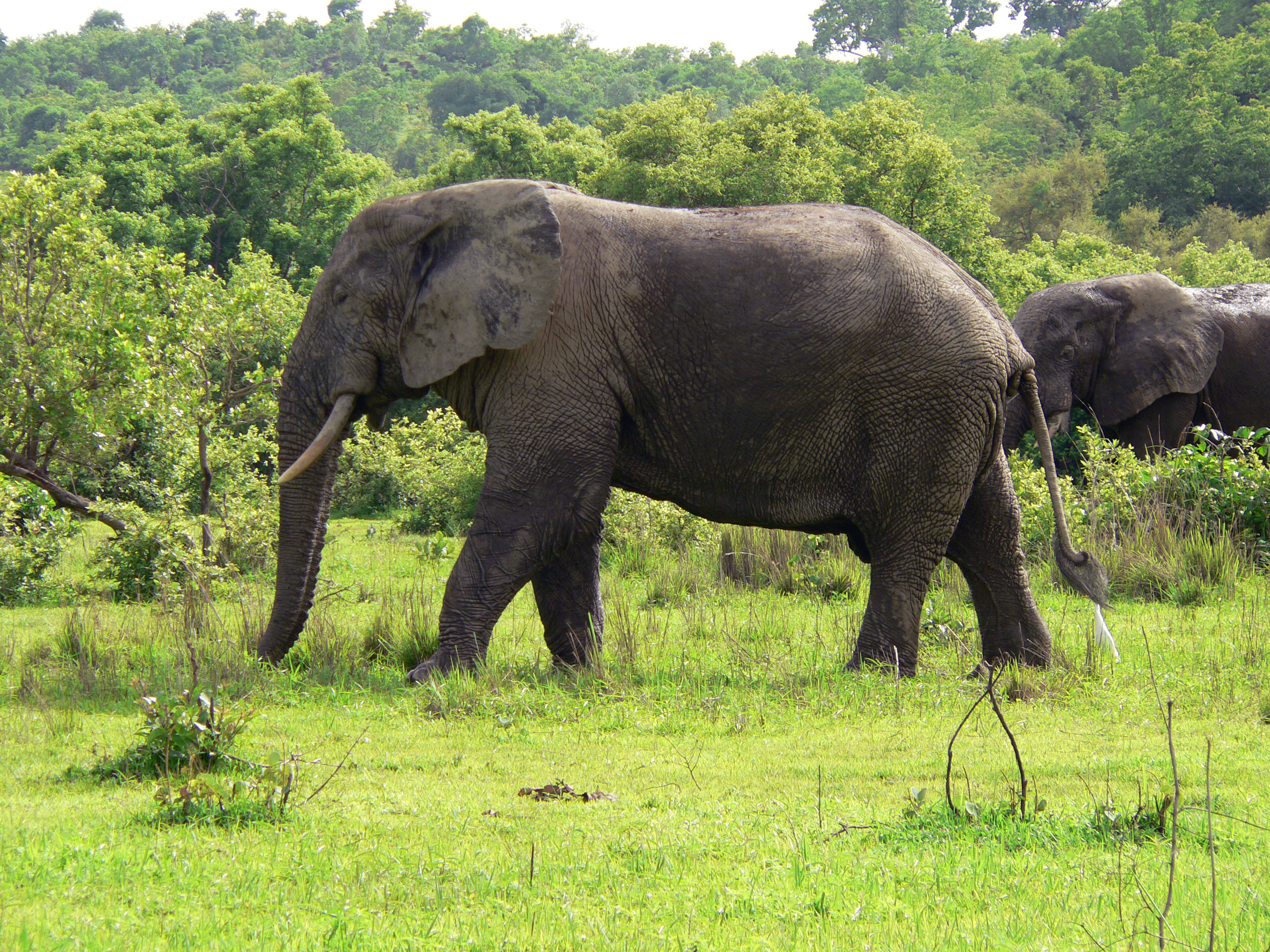
Elephants at Mole National Park

- Daboya
- Mole National Park
- Larabanga Mosque

== Upper East region ==
- Paga
- Sirigu

== Upper West region ==
- Gwollu
- Wechiau

== Volta region ==
- Amedzofe
- Kpetoe
- Liati Wote
- Kyabobo National Park
- Tiafi Atome
- Wli Waterfalls
- Avu-Lagoon
- Volta Lake

== Western region ==
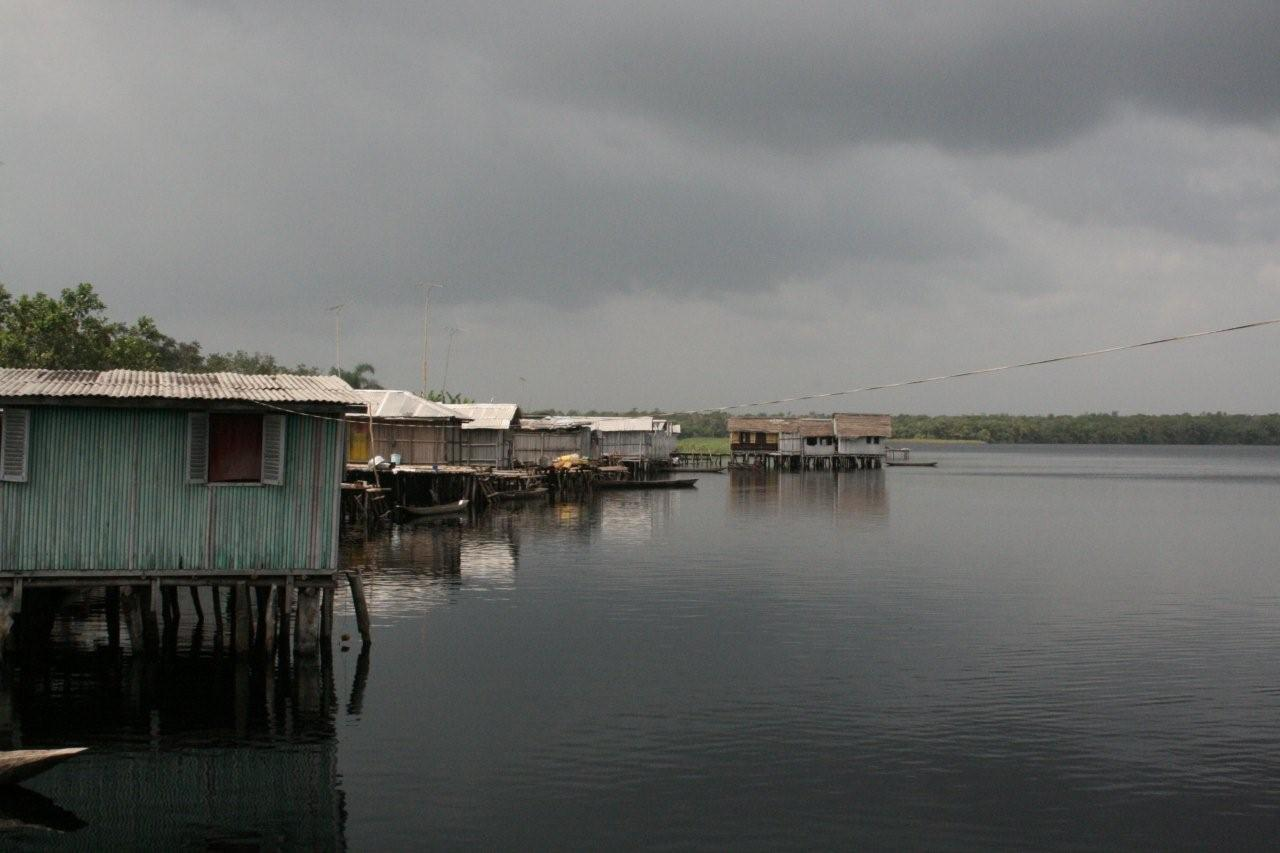
Nzulezu is entirely made up of stilts and platforms

- Ankasa National Park
- Nzulezu A village on stilts
- Wassa Domama[Rock Shrine]
