= Pearl Patricia Ankrah =

Ghanaian politician

Pearl Patricia Ankrah (also known as Patricia Pearl Ankrah) is a Ghanaian politician and public administrator. She is the current District Chief Executive(DCE) of the Afigya Kwabre South District in the Ashanti Region of Ghana. She was appointed in 2025. She is the first woman DCE in the district. Her administration is committed to inclusive development, education, and improving infrastructure.

== Appointment and history ==
In May 2025, Pearl Patricia Ankrah was selected by the President of Ghana as the District Chief Executive for Afigya Kwabre South District. The District Assembly formally confirmed Ankrah on May 13, 2025, during a meeting held at the Methodist Church auditorium in Kodie, the capital of the district.

Ankrah polled 36 "Yes" votes out of a total of 39 ballots, significantly higher than the two-thirds votes required for confirmation. The appointment of Ankrah was hailed as a landmark appointment for the district, which also had a female MP at the time (Hon. Damata Ama Appianimaa Salam) and a female District Coordinating Director (Mrs. Yvonne Naboo).
