= Boateng =

Boateng is a Ghanaian surname. It is the fourth most common surname in Ghana. Notable people with the surname include:

== A ==
- Abrantee Boateng (born 1981), English presenter
- Agyenim Boateng, Ghanaian lawyer
- Agyenim Boateng Mensah (born 1996), Ghanaian footballer
- Anthony Boateng, vice president of the Methodist Conference of Great Britain in 2023

== B ==
- Bismark Adjei-Boateng (born 1994), Ghanaian footballer

== C ==
- Charles Boateng (footballer, born 1989), Ghanaian footballer
- Charles Boateng (footballer, born 1997), Ghanaian footballer

== D ==
- Daniel Jesse Boateng (born 1992), Ghanaian footballer
- Daasebre Oti Boateng (born Emmanuel Oti Boateng, 1938–2021), Ghanaian statistician, academic, and traditional ruler.
- Derek Boateng (born 1983), Ghanaian footballer

== E ==
- Emmanuel Boateng (born 1994), Ghanaian footballer
- Emmanuel Boateng (born 1996), Ghanaian footballer
- Eric Boateng (born 1985), British basketball player

== F ==
- Francis Akwaffo-Boateng (born 1991), Ghanaian footballer
- Frank Boateng (born 1984), Ghanaian footballer

== G ==
- George Boateng (born 1975), Dutch footballer
- Gideon Boateng (born 1991), Ghanaian footballer
- Georginio Wijnaldum (born 1990), Dutch footballer, was named Georginio Boateng at birth

== H ==
- Hiram Boateng (born 1996), English footballer

== J ==
- Jérôme Boateng (born 1988), German footballer
- Joseph Boateng Danquah (born 1947), Ghanaian military officer
- Joshua Boateng (born 1987), Ghanaian footballer
- Josh Boateng (born 1997), Grenadian shot put and discus thrower

== K ==
- Kevin-Prince Boateng (born 1987), German-Ghanaian footballer
- Kennedy Boateng (footballer, born 1989), Ghanaian footballer
- Kennedy Boateng (footballer, born 1996), Ghanaian footballer
- Kingsley Boateng (born 1994), Ghanaian footballer
- Kobbie Mainoo (born 2005), English footballer, full name Kobbie Boateng Mainoo
- Kwabena Frimpong-Boateng (born 1950), Ghanaian cardiothoracic surgeon
- Kwaku Boateng (1926–2006), Ghanaian politician
- Kwaku Boateng (high jumper) (born 1974), Canadian high jumper
- Kwame Boateng (born 1992), Ghanaian footballer
- Kwame Boateng (English footballer) (born 1998), English footballer

== M ==
- Michael Boateng (born 1991), English footballer

== N ==
- Nelson Boateng (born 1968), Ghanaian sprinter
- Nyan Boateng (born 1987), American footballer

== O ==
- Osei Boateng (born 1981), Ghanaian footballer
- Ozwald Boateng (born 1967), British fashion designer

== P ==
- Paul Boateng (born 1951), British politician

== R ==
- Robert Boateng (born 1974), Ghanaian footballer
- Richard Boateng (born 1992), Ghanaian footballer
- Richard Kissi Boateng (born 1988), Ghanaian footballer

== S ==
- Sarpong Siriboe Boateng (born 1976), American musician
- Sheena Lovia Boateng, Ghanaian academic
