= Agyenim Boateng =

American lawyer

- Born: June 25, 1941 (age 85); Atimatim, Kwabre District
- Citizenship: United States; Ghana
- Education: Miami University (BA); Atlanta University (MA); Howard University (JD)
- Occupation: Attorney
- Political party: New Patriotic Party of Ghana; Republican
- Spouse: Deloris
- Children: 2

Agyenim N. Boateng (born June 25, 1941) is a Ghanaian American lawyer and judge. He is a dual citizen of the United States and Ghana currently residing in Lexington, Kentucky in the United States. He is a former Administrative Law Judge for the Transportation Cabinet of Kentucky and a former Deputy Attorney General for the State of Kentucky. He is also active in the United States wing of the New Patriotic Party of Ghana.

== Education and training ==
He was educated at St Peter's Boys School, Kumasi, Ghana, followed by secondary education at Asanteman Secondary School.

He was the first student editor of The Porcupine. He passed the Cambridge School Certificate Exam (West African Examination Council) in 1959. In 1962, he passed the University of London General Certificate of Education Advanced Level examinations. He became a tutor at his alma mater (Asanteman Secondary School) for about three years before coming to the United States for further studies in 1964. Boateng attended Miami University in Oxford, Ohio, where he obtained a B.A. in government in 1966. He further achieved a (M.A) master's degree in political science from Atlanta University (now Clark Atlanta University) in 1969.

His master's thesis was entitled "Some Problems of National Integration in Ghana and Nigeria, 1957–66: A Case Study". Agyenim then attended Howard University School of Law in Washington D.C., where he obtained a Doctor of Jurisprudence degree in 1973.

His doctoral thesis was entitled "Case Study of Forced Labor among Professionals in Europe and Africa: A Question of International Law on Human Rights". While at Howard University, he became the president of the Howard University Society of International Law (HUSIL) and led the moot court team as its captain for the annual international Jessup Moot Court Competition, organized by the American Society of International Law (ASIL). His team won the American regional championship.

== Career ==
He worked as an assistant professor at Alabama State University in Montgomery, Alabama and also at Daniel Payne College in Birmingham, Alabama, where he served as an assistant professor of political and social science. From 1973 to 1974, he served as a fellow Reginald Heber Smith Community Lawyer with the Louisville Legal Aid Society.

Boateng then joined the Commonwealth of Kentucky Transportation Cabinet, served as a state attorney, and rose through the ranks to become division director of the Administrative Law Hearing Section, where he also served as its chief administrative law judge for 16 years. In 1998, he was appointed by the Attorney General for the Commonwealth as one of his assistants, later became his deputy, and served in that post until his retirement in January 2009. Since the fall of 2014, he has been serving as an adjunct professor of American government at Midway College, Midway, Kentucky.

== Achievements ==
In 1973, he became a Reginald H. Smith Fellow, selected with 2000 other U.S. law school graduates to work as community lawyers across the U.S. for various legal aid societies.

He was a member of the U.S. Ghanaian diasporans who went to Ghana in 2005 to lobby the Ghana Parliament for the passage of Representative of the People's Amendment Act 699' (ROPAA), which gave the right of Ghana diasporas to vote in Ghana's general elections and referendums from their places of residence. On December 17, 2008, he and five other plaintiffs from the U.S. successfully sued and won at the Accra High Court of Human Rights against the Electoral Commission of Ghana for the right of the Ghanaian diaspora to vote in the 2020 general elections. He also drafted the necessary regulations (constitutional instruments) for implementation by the National Electoral Commission of Ghana (NEC), which failed to implement them.

Agyenim Boateng is now in private practice, serving as a legal and policy analyst consultant at his office in Lexington, Kentucky.

=== Awards ===
- Award for Excellence: Howard University School of law(1973) Law School Team Captain and Oralist, American Students' International Law Moot Court Competition
- Honorable Order of Kentucky Colonel 2009 by Governor of Kentucky for meritorious service on his retirement.
- Recognition award : The Senate of the Commonwealth of Kentucky, July 7, 2012; For distinguish service to the State of Kentucky, community and the legal profession
- Elevated to Senior Counselor status by the Kentucky Bar Association (KBA) at its annual convention held in Lexington, Kentucky, on June 22, 2015
- Member of International Toastmasters, Lex Mark Club. Earned Distinguished Toastmasters (DTM) award on Feb 5, 2020. DTM is the highest award conferred on International Toastmasters members

== Personal life ==
Dr. Agyenim Boateng is from Atimatim-Kumasi, Efigya-Kwabre District and belongs to the Ekuona clan of the Ashanti. He lived with wife Deloris (died May 27, 2015, in Montgomery, Alabama) and with their two children in Lexington, KY.
