= Buoho =

- Urban area
- Country: Ghana
- Region: Ashanti Region
- District: Afigya-Kwabre District
- Time zone: GMT
  - Summer (DST): GMT

Buoho is a town in the Afigya-Kwabre District of the Ashanti Region noted for the Buoho Grotto.

== See also ==
Agbenohoe
