= Phrynobatrachus ghanensis =

Conservation status
- Near Threatened (IUCN 3.1)

Scientific classification
- Kingdom: Animalia
- Phylum: Chordata
- Class: Amphibia
- Order: Anura
- Family: Phrynobatrachidae
- Genus: Phrynobatrachus
- Species: P. ghanensis

Binomial name
- Phrynobatrachus ghanensis Schiøtz, 1964

Species of amphibian

Phrynobatrachus ghanensis, or the Ghana river frog, is a species of frogs in the family Petropedetidae. It is found in southern Ghana (type locality, the Kakum National Park, and Bobiri) and southeastern Ivory Coast. It is an inconspicuous forest floor species inhabiting swampy primary rainforest, although it has also been found by small temporary pools in bamboo forest and close to forest edges. Presumably, it is threatened by habitat loss.
