= Asonomaso =

Coordinates: 6°50′N 1°30′W

- Village
- Location within Ghana
- Country: Ghana
- Region: Ashanti Region
- District: Kwabre East District
- Elevation: 712 ft (217 m)
- Time zone: GMT
  - Summer (DST): GMT

Asonomaso is a town in the Ashanti Region of Ghana located in Kwabre East District. Asonomaso is about 27 kilometers northeast of Kumasi

== See also ==
- Adanwomase
