= Adventist Girls High School =

Location
- P. O. Box KS 9743, Kumasi; Ntonso, Ashanti Region; Ghana; 6.8183°N 1.5226°W

Information
- Type: Public high school
- Religious affiliation: Seventh-day Adventist Church
- Established: 1998
- Status: Active
- Oversight: Ministry of Education
- Headmistress: Selina Anane Afoakwa
- Gender: Girls
- Age: 14 to 18
- Classes offered: General Arts, Home Economics, Science, Visual and Performing Arts, and Languages
- Houses: 9

Adventist Girls' High School (formerly Ntonso Senior High School) is a Ghanaian girls' senior high school at Ntonso in the Kwabre East District of the Ashanti Region.

== See also ==
- Education in Ghana
- List of senior high schools in the Ashanti Region
- List of Seventh-day Adventist secondary schools
