= Afigya Kwabre South (Ghana parliament constituency) =

Constituency in Ghana

- constituency for the Parliament of Ghana
- District: Afigya-Kwabre District
- Region: Ashanti Region of Ghana

Current constituency
- Created: 2012
- Party: New Patriotic Party
- MP: Damata Ama Appianima Salam

Afigya Kwabre South is one of the constituencies represented in the Parliament of Ghana. It elects one Member of Parliament (MP) by the first past the post system of election. Afigya Kwabre South is located in the Afigya-Kwabre District of the Ashanti Region of Ghana.

== Boundaries ==
The Afigya Kwabre South constituency is located entirely within the boundaries of the Afigya-Kwabre South District in the Ashanti Region. The district itself was created on 1 November 2007. It was carved out of Kwabre East and Sekyere South Districts.

== Members of Parliament ==
First elected	Member	Party
Created 2012
2012	William Owuraku Aidoo	New Patriotic Party

William Owuraku Aidoo of the New Patriotic Party was the first ever elected MP for this constituency in the 2012 Ghanaian general election. He retained his seat in the 2016 Ghanaian general election.

== Elections ==
2016 Ghanaian general election: Afigya Kwabre South
Party	Candidate	Votes	%	±%
New Patriotic Party	William Owuraku Aidoo	48,184	81.71	+1.76
National Democratic Congress	Oppong Kyekyeku Kaakyire	8,217	13.93	−3.28
Independent	Millicent Elizabeth Boateng	2,018	3.42	—
Progressive People's Party	Isaac Brobbey	283	0.48	−2.04
People's National Convention	Robert Dambo	266	0.45	—
Majority		39,967	67.78	+5.04
Turnout		59,186	77.00	—
Registered electors		76,418		—

2012 Ghanaian general election: Afigya Kwabre South
Party	Candidate	Votes	%	±%
New Patriotic Party	William Owuraku Aidoo	45,841	79.95	—
National Democratic Congress	Oppong Kyekye Kaakyire	9,911	17.21	—
Progressive People's Party	John Yaw Asubonteng	1,446	2.52	—
National Democratic Party	Kwame Amaning-Kwarteng Amoako	139	0.24	—
Majority		35,930	62.74	—
Turnout		57,621	87.17	—
Registered electors		66,096		—

== See also ==
- List of Ghana Parliament constituencies
