= Bobiri =

Coordinates: 6°50′N 1°31′W

- Peri Urban area
- Location within Ghana
- Country: Ghana
- Region: Ashanti Region
- District: Kumasi Metropolitan
- Time zone: GMT
  - Summer (DST): GMT

Bobiri is a town in the Kwabre East District of the Ashanti Region noted for Bobiri Butterfly Sanctuary.

== See also ==
- Adanwomase
- Asonomaso
