= Ahwiaa =

- Urban area
- Location within Ghana
- Coordinates: 6.7816712°N 1.631397°W
- Country: Ghana
- Region: Ashanti Region
- District: Kumasi Metropolitan
- Time zone: GMT
  - Summer (DST): GMT

Ahwiaa is a town in the Kwabre East District of the Ashanti Region noted for its wood carvings, arts and crafts.

== Location ==
Ahwiaa is located 9 kilometres from Kumasi along the Kumasi- Mampong Highway N10.

== See also ==
- Offinso
- Adanwomase
