= Buoho Grotto =

The St Mary's Sanctuary Buoho Grotto is one of the Christian Pilgrimage for Catholics in Ghana located at Buoho in the Afigya-Kwabre District of the Ashanti Region of Ghana

== History ==
The Sanctuary was completed within a period of eight months and dedicated on 12 November 1949.
