= Ntonso =

Coordinates: 6°50′N 1°31′W

- Urban area
- Location within Ghana
- Country: Ghana
- Region: Ashanti Region
- District: Kumasi Metropolitan
- Time zone: GMT
  - Summer (DST): GMT

Ntonso is a town in the Kwabre East District of the Ashanti Region noted for its Adinkra crafts. It is located about 15 km north of Kumasi in the Ashanti region. It is also the home of Adventist Girls High School.

== Home of Adinkra ==
Ntonso is the place where the adinkra cloth is made in Ghana. The traditional adinkra is made from the scratch locally. It is the producer of Ghana's adinkra, a fabric known for its proverbial wisdom and symbols. The cloth was initially worn for funerals only in the Ashanti region of Ghana. It comes in a variety of colors such as brown, red and black. Currently, it is produced in all colors and used everywhere in Ghana.

== Hospitality ==
Ntonso also has visitor centers and official tour guides. Visitors could be engaged in a variety of stages of adinkra production like dye preparation, adinkra stamping, cloth dyeing and embroidery of stamped cloth.

== See also ==
- Adanwomase
