= Pankrono =

Coordinates: 6°45′N 1°36′W

- Urban area
- Location within Ghana
- Country: Ghana
- Region: Ashanti Region
- District: Kumasi Metropolitan
- Time zone: GMT
  - Summer (DST): GMT

Pankrono is a town in the Kwabre East District of the Ashanti Region of Ghana, noted for its pottery.

== Location ==
Pankrono is 8 kilometres on the Kumasi - Mampong Highway. It is located after Tafo.

== See also ==
- Adanwomase
