= Fort Apollonia =

Ghanaian fort

- Part of British Gold Coast
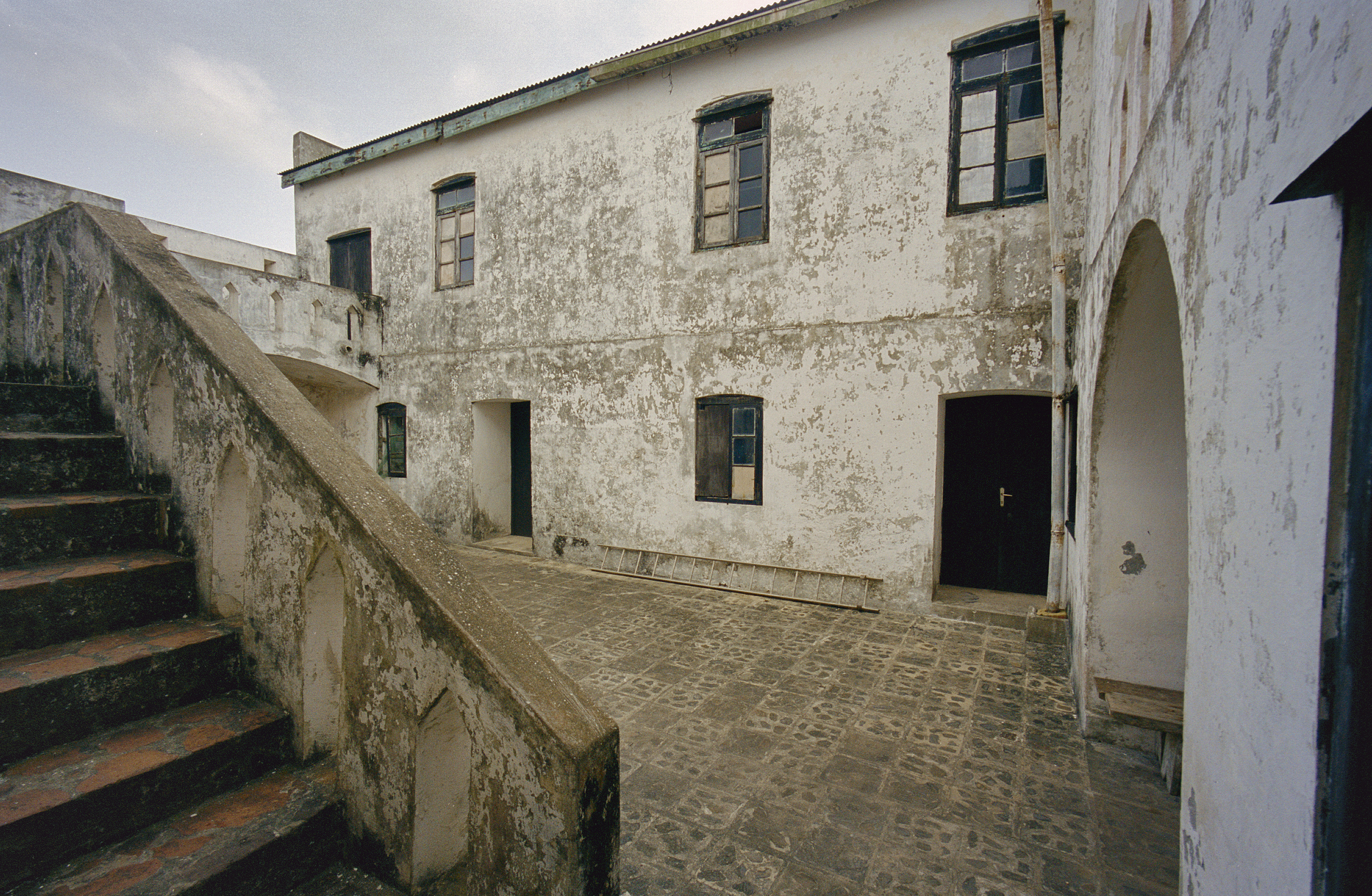

Site information
- Open to the public: Yes

Location
- Coordinates: 5.00°N 2.645°W

Site history
- Built: 1768

Garrison information
- Occupants: Britain (1768-1868); Netherlands (1868-1872)

Fort Apollonia is a fort in Beyin, Ghana. The name Apollonia was given to the area by a Portuguese explorer who sighted the place on the Feast of Saint Apollonia, 9 February. Because of its importance during the European colonial period and its testimony to the Atlantic slave trade, Fort Apollonia was inscribed on the UNESCO World Heritage List along with several other forts and castles in Ghana in 1979.

== History ==
The Swedes established a trading post at Apollona as part of the Swedish Gold Coast between 1655 and 1657. In 1691, a British trading post was erected at this site, which between 1768 and 1770 was extended into a fort.

After the abolition of slave trade, the fort was abandoned in 1819, but it was again occupied from 1836 onward.

The fort was transferred to the Dutch as part of a large trade of forts between Britain and the Netherlands in 1868, on which occasion it was renamed Fort Willem III, after King William III of the Netherlands. Four years later, however, on 6 April 1872, the fort was, along with the entire Dutch Gold Coast, again transferred to the United Kingdom, as per the Gold Coast treaty of 1871. The British bombarded the fort in 1873 on the attack of Beyin on account of its coalition with the Ashantis.

== Heritage site ==
The fort was rehabilitated in 1962 and completed in 1968 by the Ghana Museums and Monuments Board. Since 2010 it has housed the Museum of Nzema Culture and History.

== Gallery ==
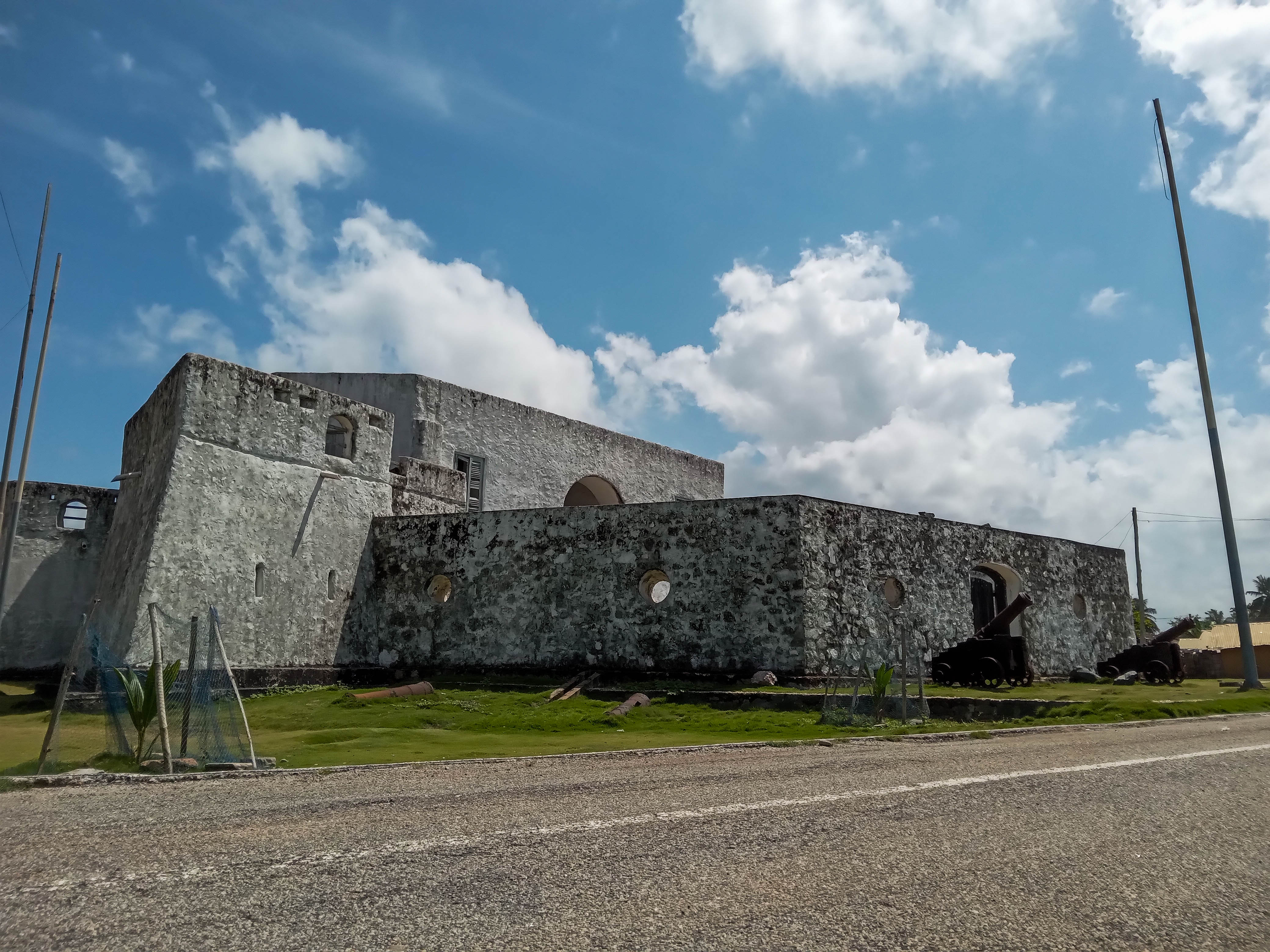
Fort Apollonia

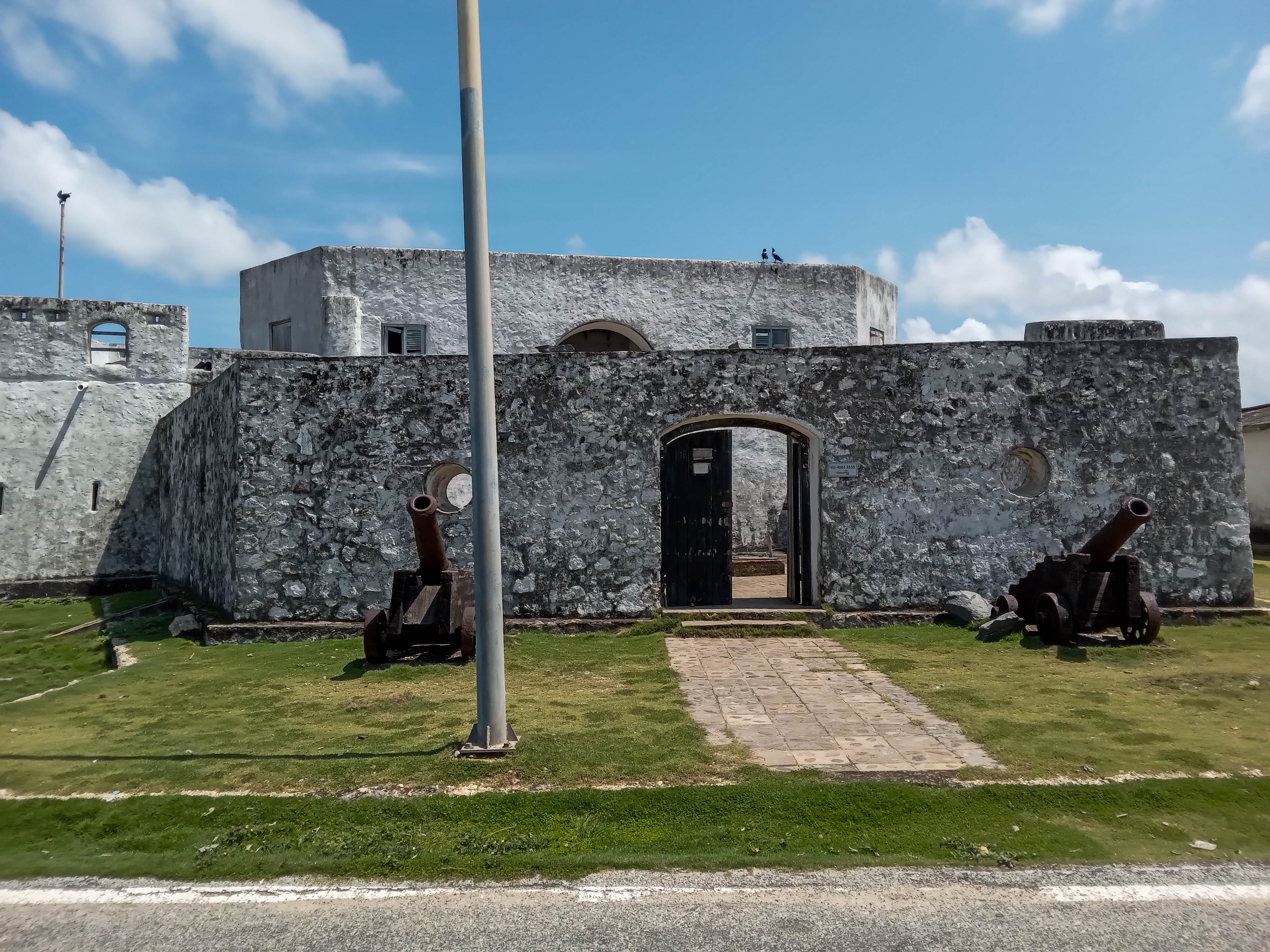
Fort Apollonia in Ghana

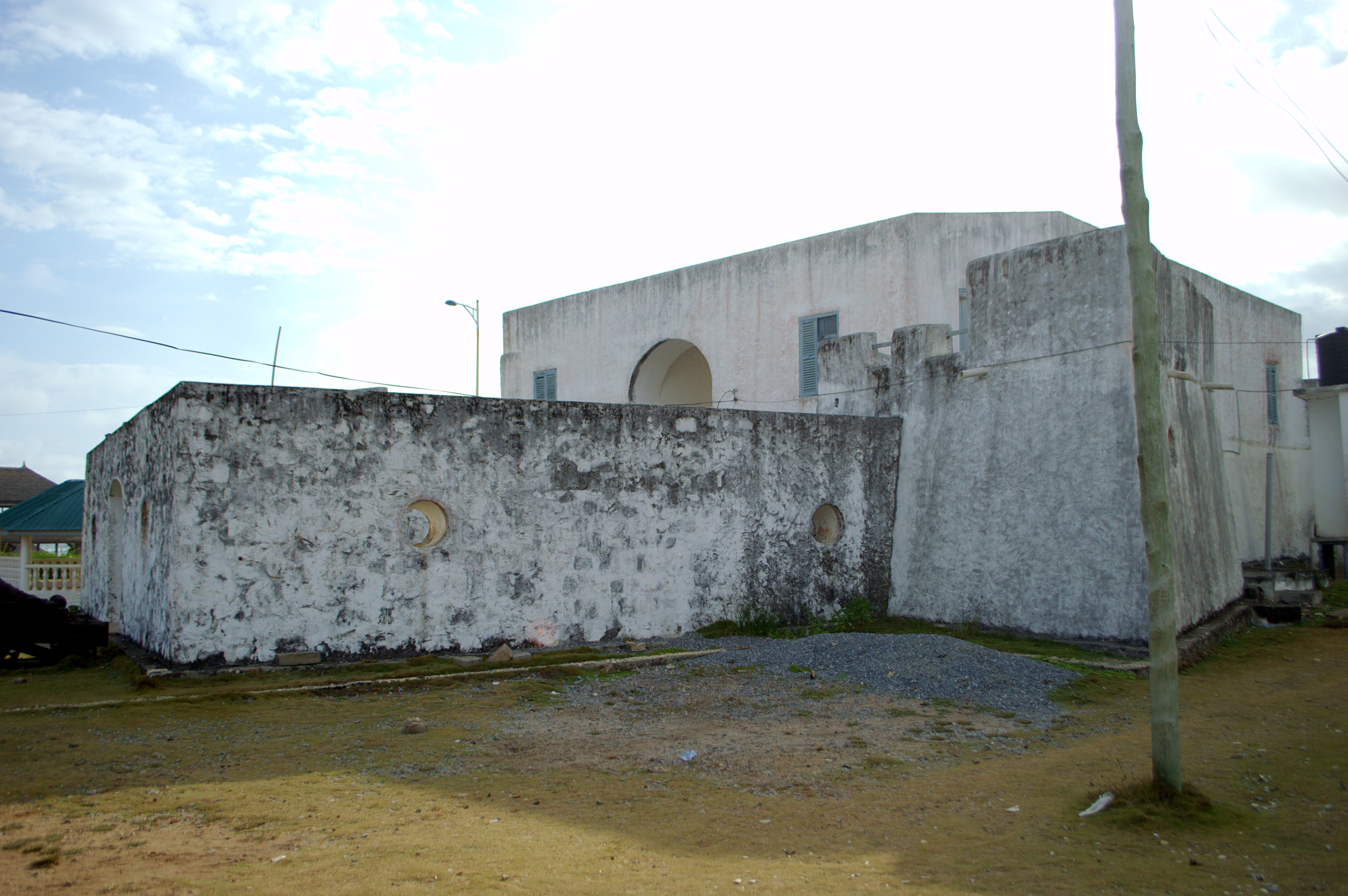
Landscape view of Fort Apollonia

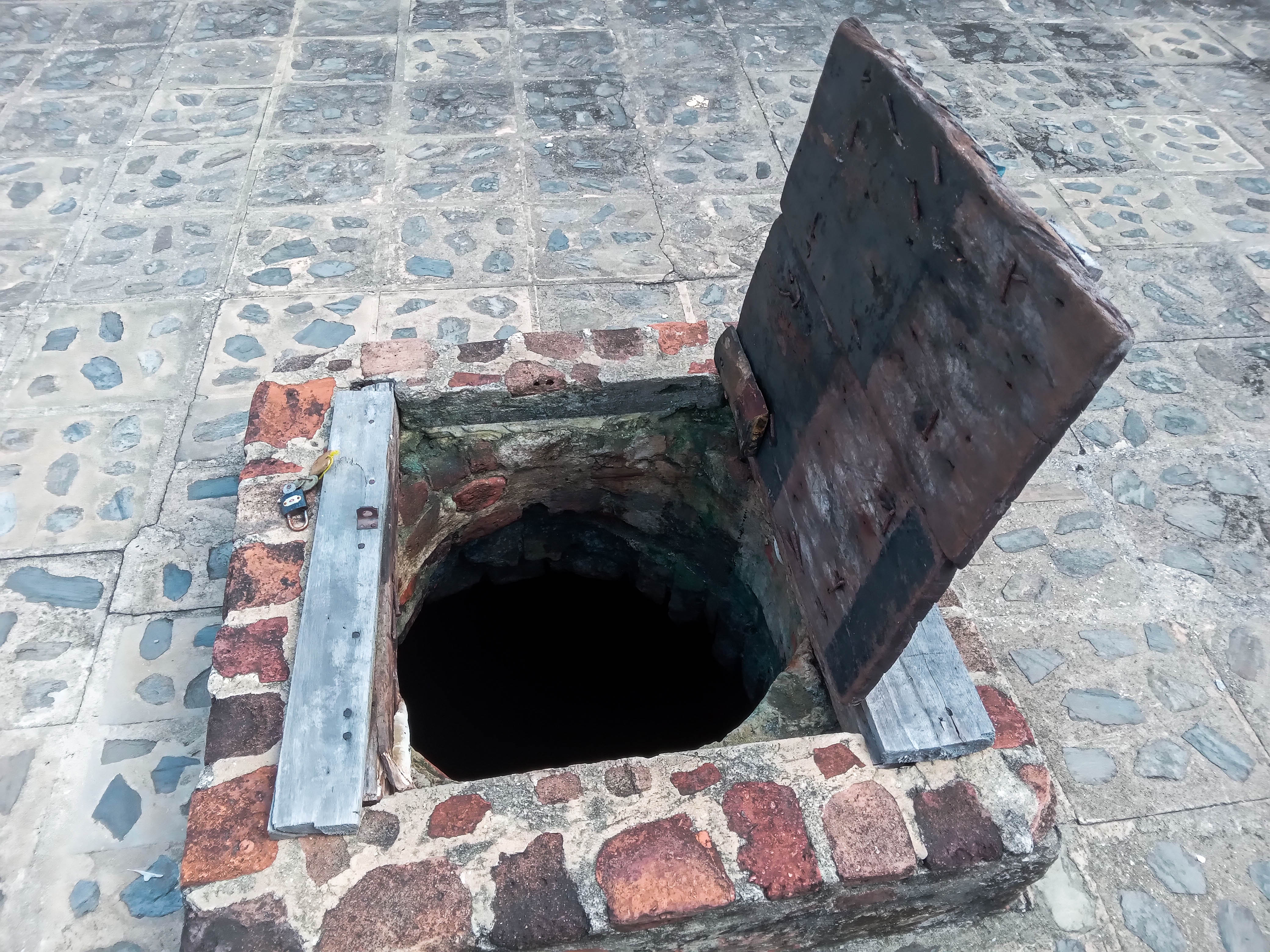
Water storage at Fort Apollonia

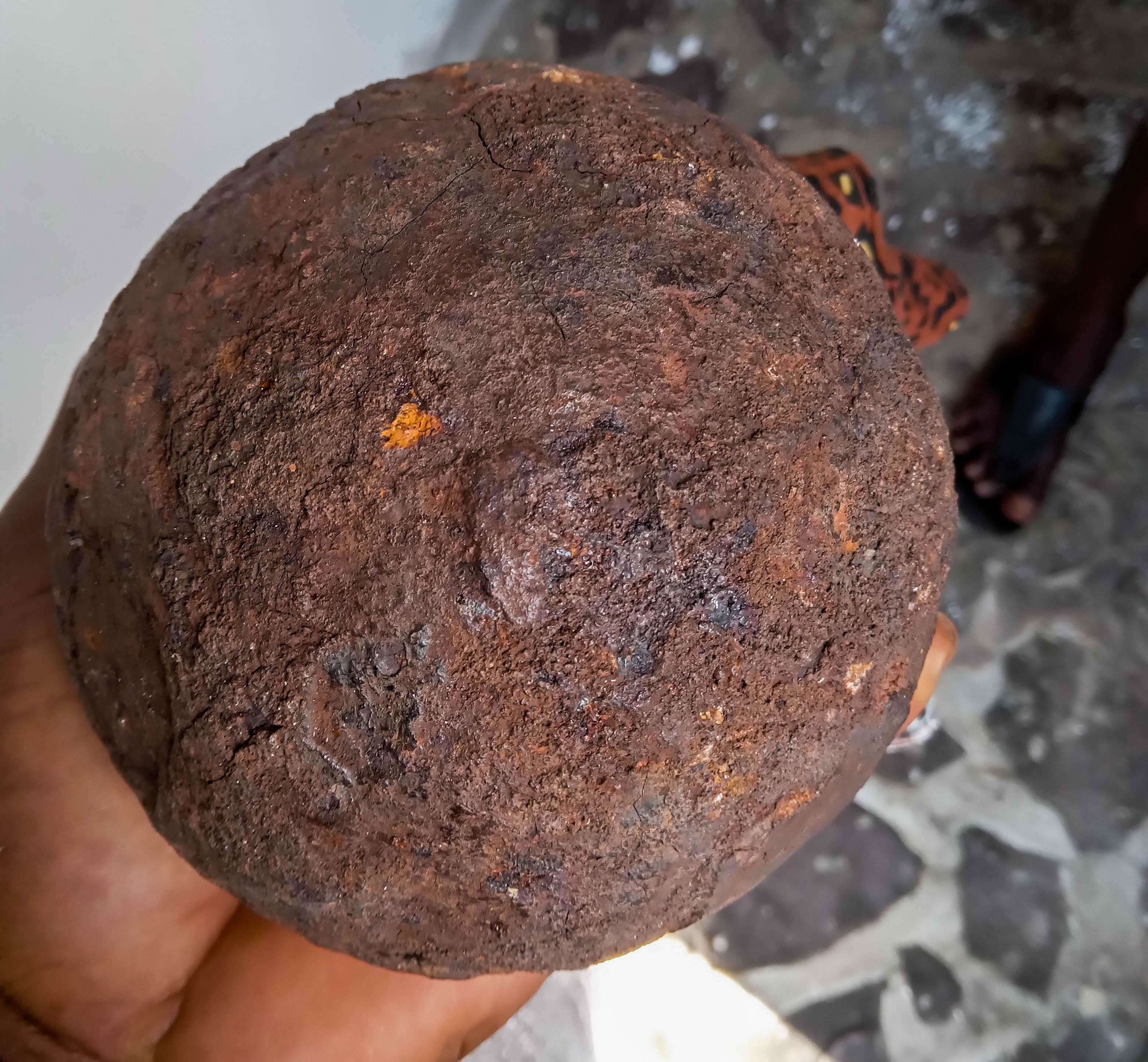
Cannon ball at Fort Apollonia

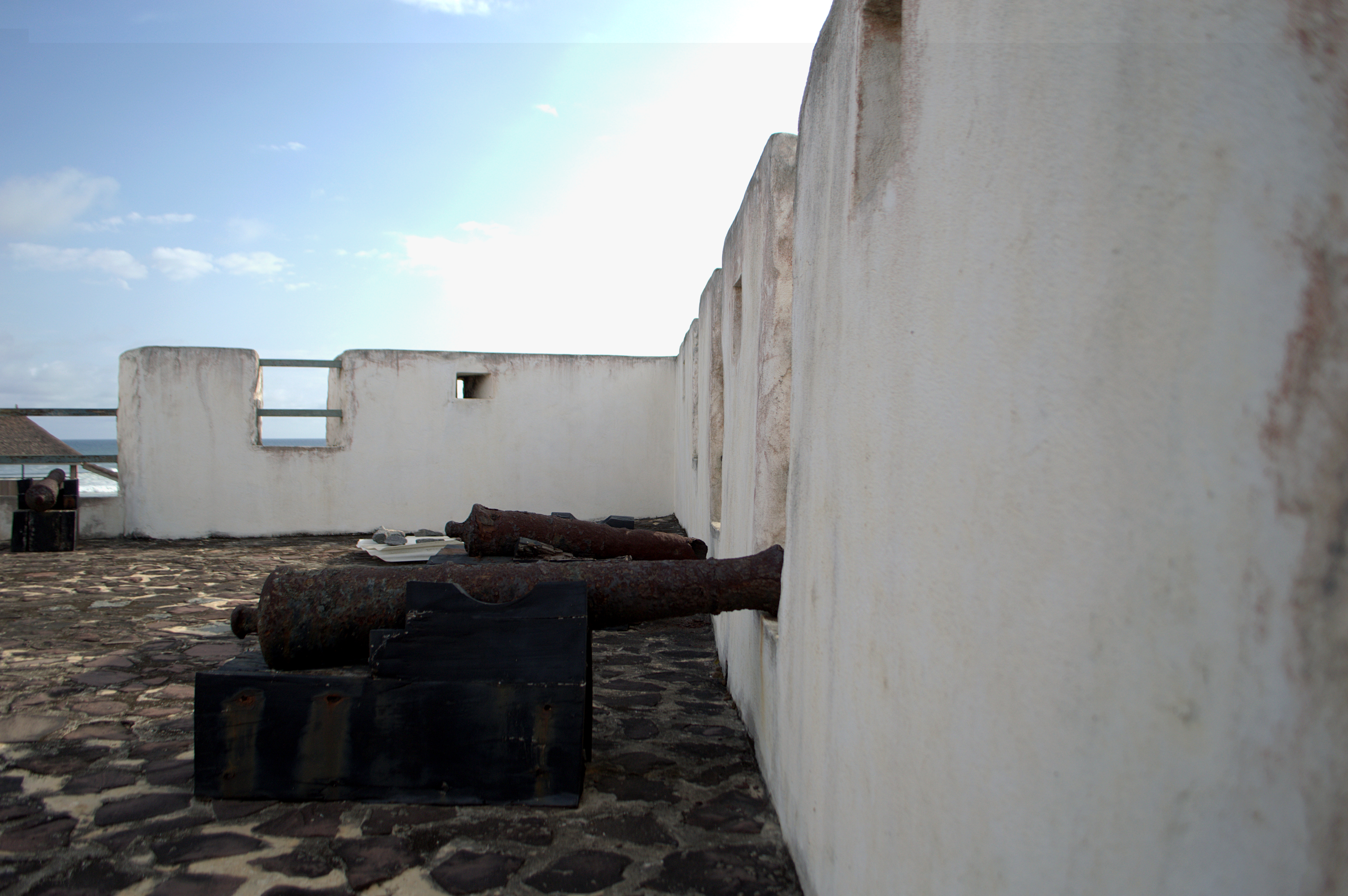
Fort Apollonia

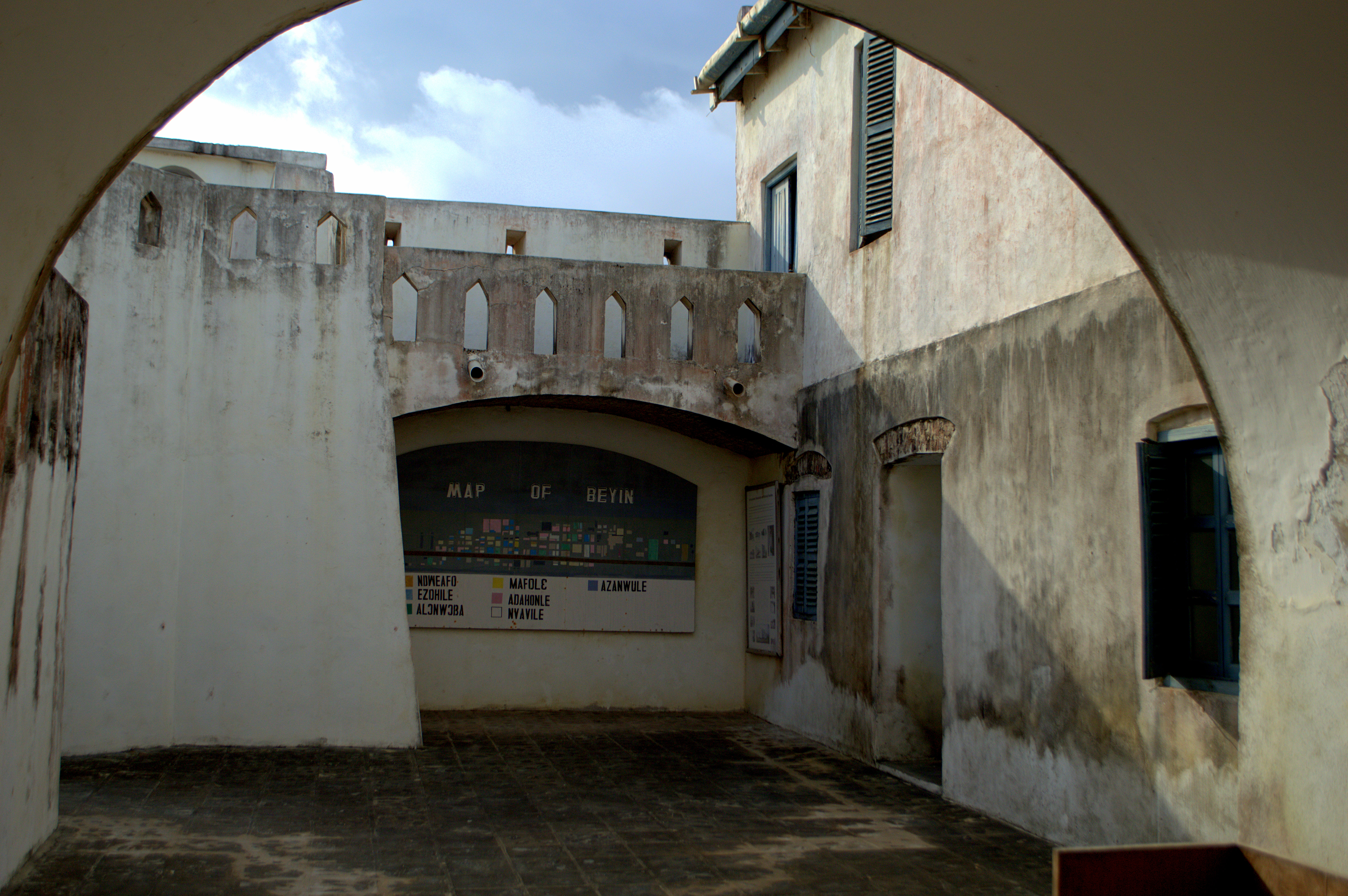
Fort Apollonia

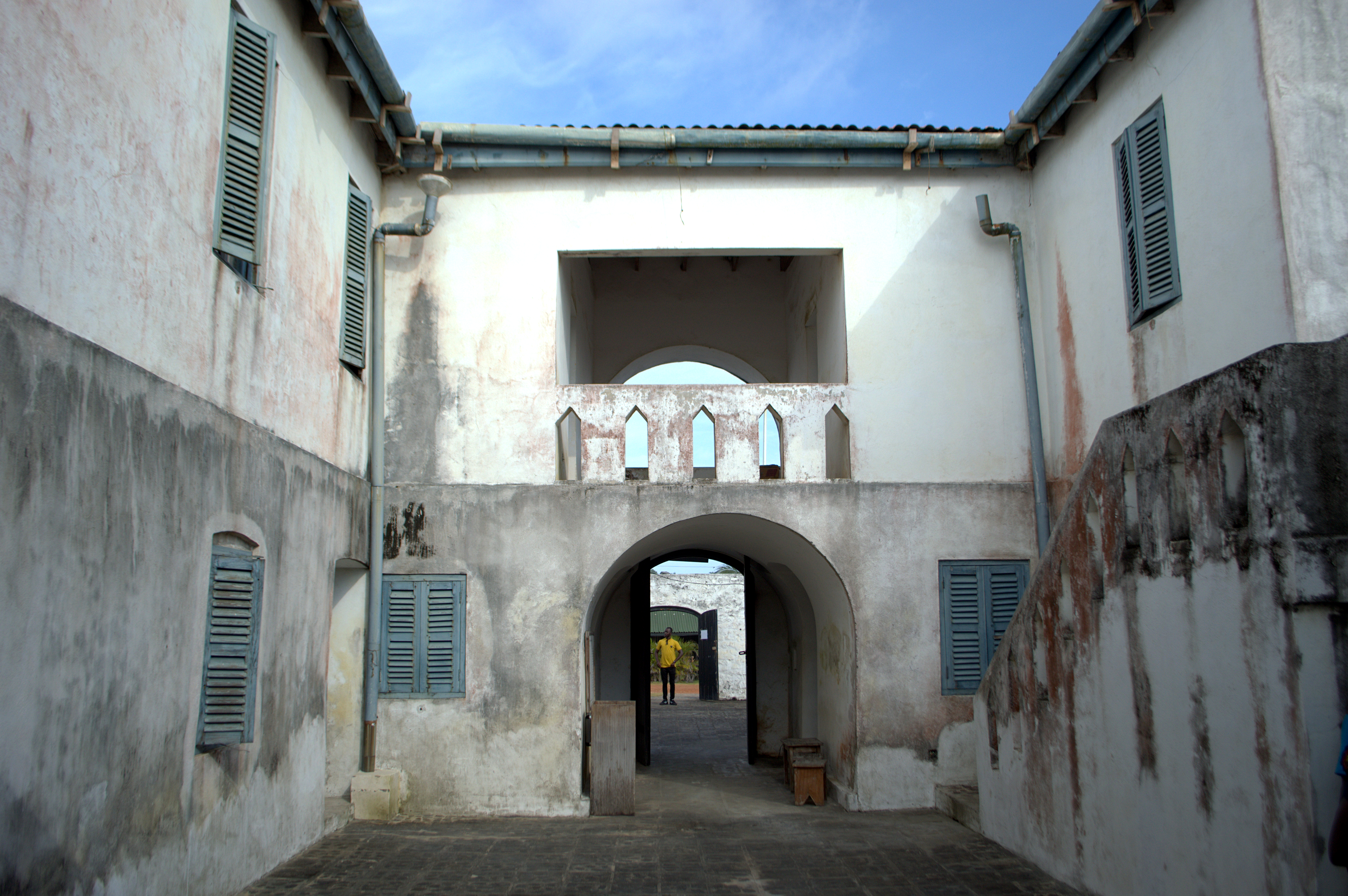
Fort Apollonia

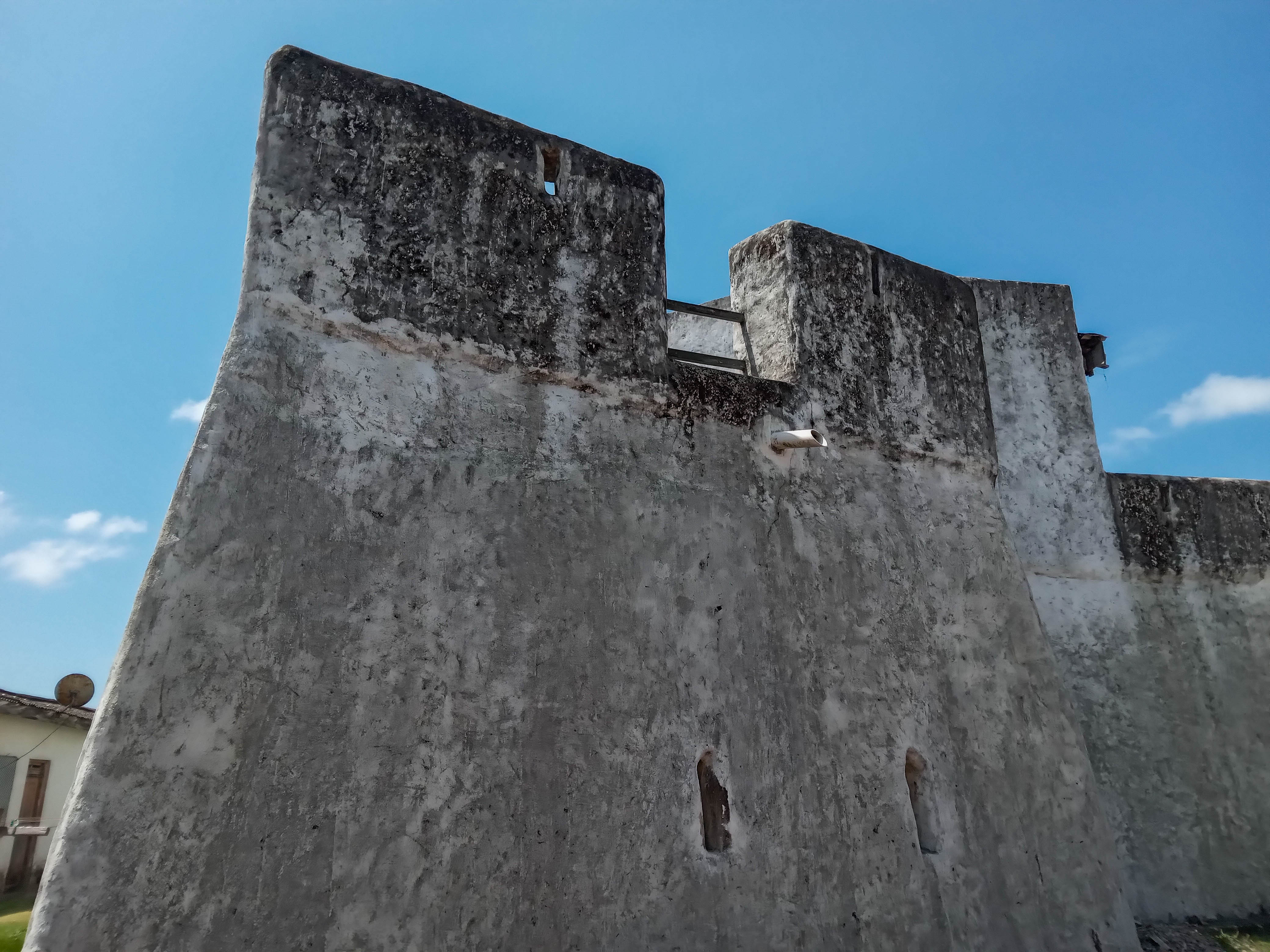
Fort Apollonia

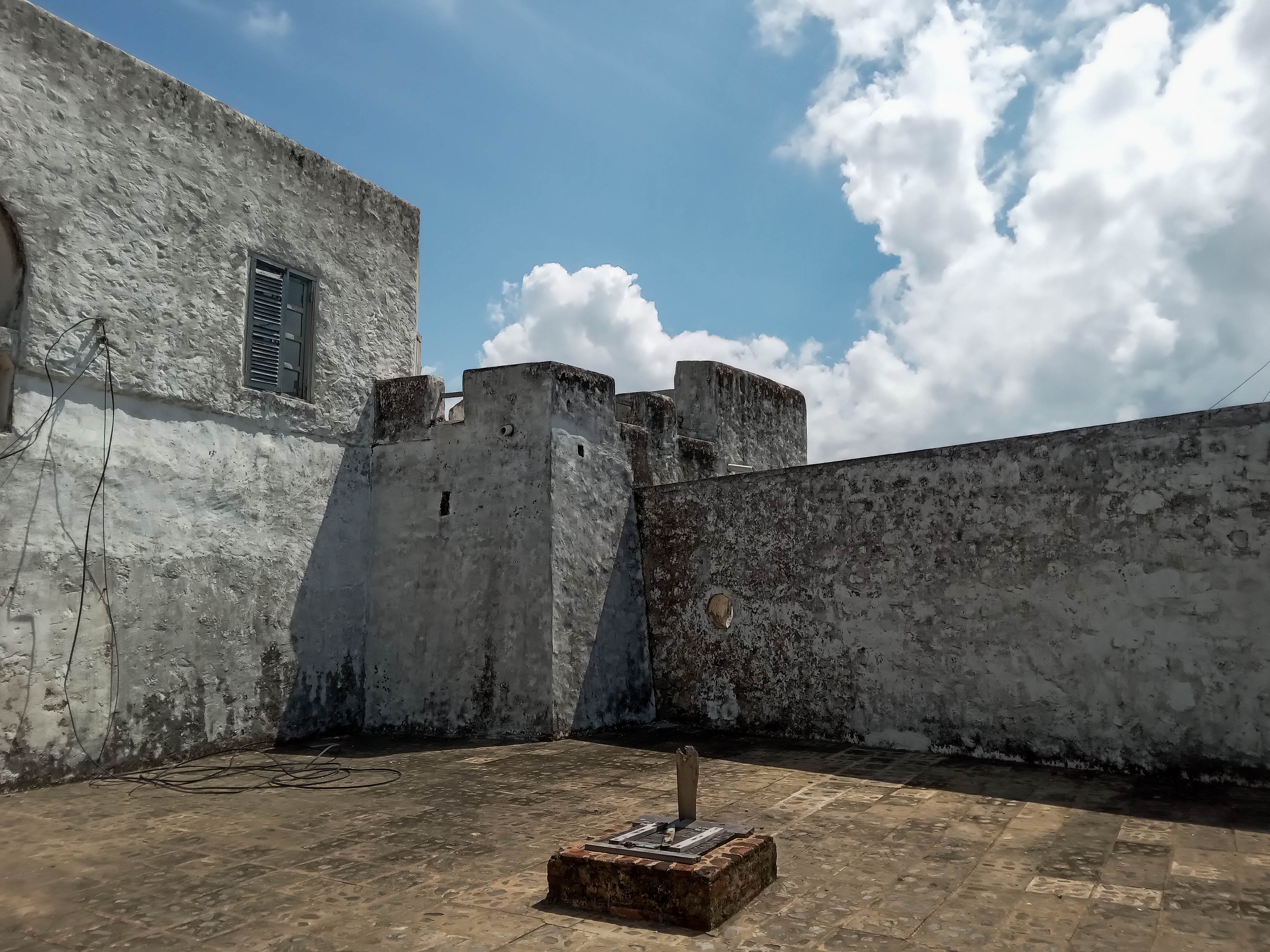
Fort Apollonia in Ghana
