= Damata Ama Appianimaa Salam =

Ghanaian politician

Hon. Damata Ama Appianimaa Salam MP

Member of Parliament for Afigya Kwabre South
- Incumbent
- Assumed office 7 January 2025
- Preceded by: William Owuraku Aidoo
- President: John Mahama
- Vice President: Jane Naana Opoku-Agyemang

Personal details
- Born: 26 March 1977 (age 49) Kenyasi‑Brofoyedru
- Party: New Patriotic Party
- Occupation: Politician
- Committees: Youth and Sports; Budget

Damata Ama Appianimaa Salam (born 26 March 1977) is a Ghanaian politician and Member of Parliament for the Afigya Kwabre South constituency in the Ashanti Region. She represents the New Patriotic Party (NPP) in the Ninth Parliament of the Fourth Republic of Ghana.

== Early life and education ==
Salam was born on 26 March 1977, and hails from Kenyasi‑Brofoyedru in the Ashanti Region. She earned a BSc in agriculture from the University for Development Studies and later obtained an MSc in Strategic Management and Leadership from the Kwame Nkrumah University of Science and Technology.

== Politics ==
Salam contested and won the Afigya Kwabre South seat in the December 2024 general election on the ticket of the New Patriotic Party (NPP). She won by 50,981 votes (76.05%), defeating her main opponent, Nuzagl Vivien Nyuzagla of the National Democratic Congress (NDC), who polled 16,051 votes (23.95%).

She succeeded the former MP, William Owuraku Aidoo, becoming the first woman to represent the constituency in Parliament.
