= Beyin =

- Village
- Location within Ghana
- Coordinates: 4°59′06″N 2°35′13″W
- Country: Ghana
- Region: Western Region
- District: Jomoro District
- Elevation: 125 ft (38.1 m)
- Time zone: GMT
  - Summer (DST): GMT

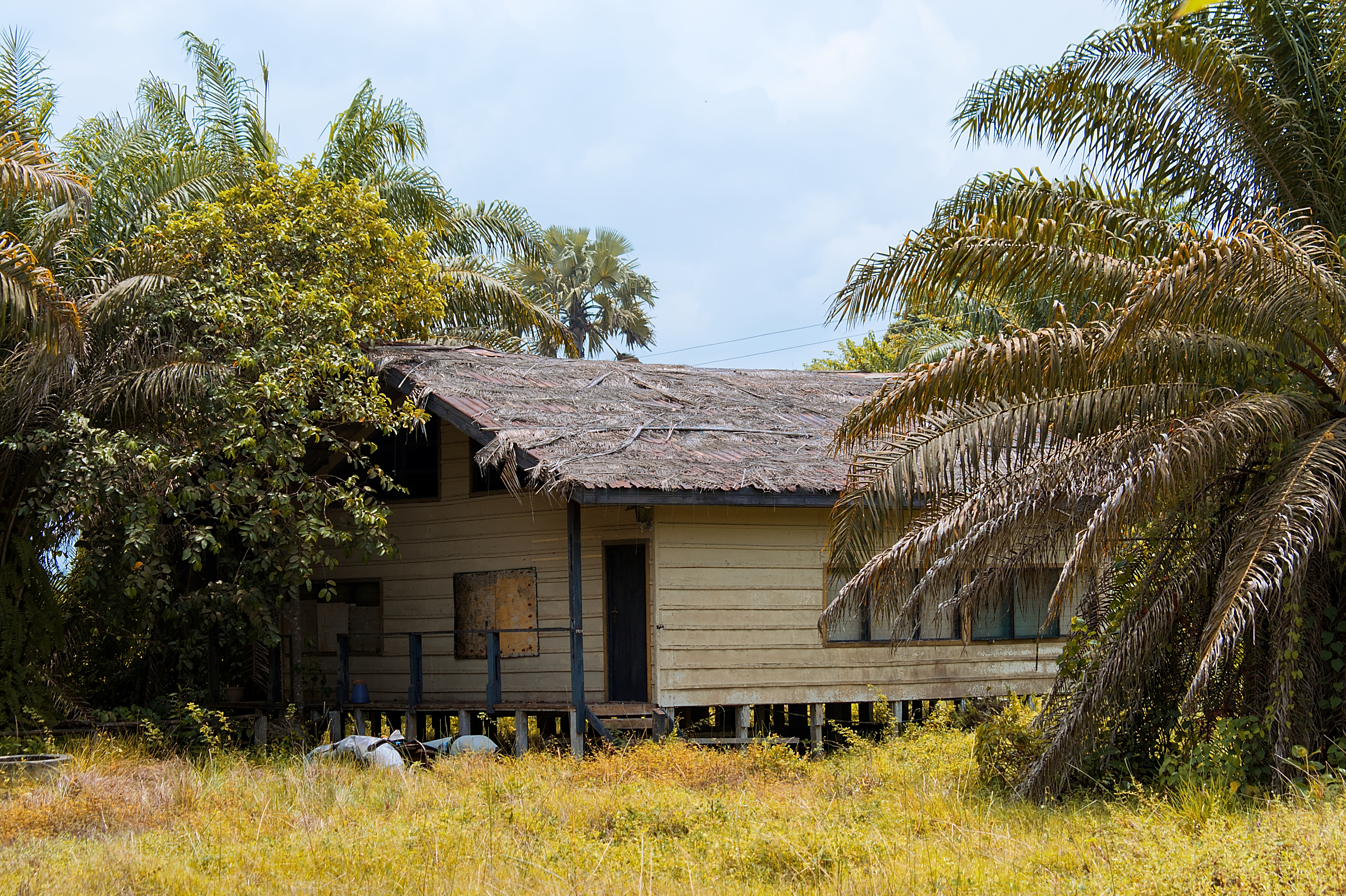
Wooden house in Beyin

Beyin is a village in the Jomoro district, a district in the Western Region of Ghana and also the traditional capital of the Western Nzema traditional Council . Beyin contains the Fort Apollonia Castle, the Royal Palace for the Omanhene(Paramount Chief) of West Nzema Traditional Council and nice beach resorts like the Prestigious Tenack Beach Resort.Beyin is the closest town to the famous UNESCO heritage site Nzulezo.
