= Mamponteng =

- District Capital
- Location in Ghana
- Country: Ghana
- Region: Ashanti Region
- District: Kwabre District; Kwabre East District

Mamponteng is the capital of Kwabre East Municipal in the Ashanti Region of Ghana.
