= Atimatim =

Coordinates: 5°52′N 0°35′W

- Urban area
- Location within Ghana
- Country: Ghana
- Region: Ashanti Region
- District: Kumasi Metropolitan
- Time zone: GMT
  - Summer (DST): GMT

Atimatim is a town in the [Old Tafo Municipality] of the Ashanti Region of Ghana.

== See also ==
- Pankrono
