= Afigya Kwabre South District =

- District
- Districts of Ashanti Region

- Location of Afigya Kwabre South District within Ashanti
- Coordinates: 6°44′N 1°37′W
- Country: Ghana
- Region: Ashanti
- Capital: Kodie

Area
  - Total: 159.9 km^{2} (61.7 sq mi)

Population (2021 Census)
  - Total: 234,667
  - Density: 1,468/km^{2} (3,801/sq mi)
- Time zone: UTC+0 (GMT)
- ISO 3166 code: GH-AS-__

Afigya Kwabre South District is one of the forty-three districts in Ashanti Region, Ghana. The area was formerly part of the larger Afigya Kwabre District, until the northern part of the district was split off to create Afigya Kwabre North District on 15 March 2018; thus the remaining part has been renamed as Afigya Kwabre South District. The district assembly is located in the northern part of Ashanti Region and has Kodie as its capital town.

== Sources ==
- "Districts of Ghana". Statoids.
- GhanaDistricts.com
