= Kodie, Ghana =

Kodie
- District Capital
- Location in Ghana
- Coordinates: 6°44′N 1°37′W
- Country: Ghana
- Region: Ashanti Region
- District: Afigya Kwabre South

Kodie is a small town and the capital of Afigya-Kwabre South district, a district in the Ashanti Region of Ghana.
