= Sheena Lovia Boateng =

Ghanaian academic

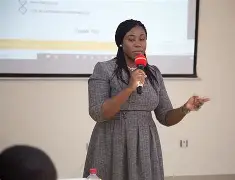
- Known for: First woman to receive a PhD in marketing from the University of Ghana; First woman to become a professor of marketing and entrepreneurship at the University of Ghana
- Title: Associate Professor of Marketing and Entrepreneurship

Academic background
- Education: University of Ghana

Academic work
- Discipline: Marketing
- Institutions: University of Ghana Business School

Sheena Lovia Boateng is a Ghanaian academic in marketing and entreprenuership. She is an associate professor at the University of Ghana Business School (UGBS), the executive director of PearlRichards Foundation, and the founder of the Women in Tertiary Education (WITE) Network. She is the first woman to receive a doctorate in marketing from the University of Ghana, as well as the university's first woman hired as a professor of marketing and entrepreneurship.

== Early life and education ==
Boateng spent some of her formative years at St. Monica's Senior High School in Mampong-Asanti, located in the Ashanti Region of Ghana. She graduated from the University of Ghana with a bachelor's degree in marketing and later acquired both her Master of Philosophy and Doctor of Philosophy in marketing at the University of Ghana Business School in 2013. She is the first woman to receive a doctorate in marketing from the University of Ghana.

== Career ==
Boateng began her career as an academic lecturer at the UGBS in 2019, teaching in the Department of Marketing and Entrepreneurship. In 2022, she was promoted to Senior Lecturer at the School of Marketing and Entrepreneurship department and also held administrative roles, including Communication Coordinator for the College of Humanities at the University of Ghana. In February 2025, Boateng was promoted to the rank of Associate Professor, becoming the first woman to attain the rank of professor in marketing and entrepreneurship at the University of Ghana.

In addition to her position with UGBS, Boateng founded the Women in Tertiary Education (WITE) Network, which supports women in higher education. She is also the executive director of PearlRichards Foundation.

== Books ==
- Boateng, Richard; Boateng, Sheena Lovia; Anning-Dorson, Thomas; Olumide Babatope, Longe, eds. (2022). Digital Innovations, Business and Society in Africa: New Frontiers and a Shared Strategic Vision. Springer International Publishing. doi:10.1007/978-3-030-77987-0. ISBN 978-3-030-77986-3.
- Boateng, Sheena Lovia; Boateng, Richard; Anning-Dorson, Thomas, eds. (2023). Empowering Women in the Digital Economy: A Quest for Meaningful Connectivity and Access in Developing Countries. Routledge/Taylor & Francis Group. ISBN 978-1-032-29850-4.
- Boateng, Richard; Boateng, Sheena Lovia; Anning-Dorson, Thomas; Penu, Obed Kwame Adzaku, eds. (2025). AI and the Creative Economy: Transforming Content Creation and Influencer Entrepreneurship. AI innovations - shaping the future. New York, NY: Routledge. ISBN 978-1-032-97596-2.
