= Nzulezo =

Village in Western region, Ghana

Coordinates: 05°01′14″N 02°35′52″W

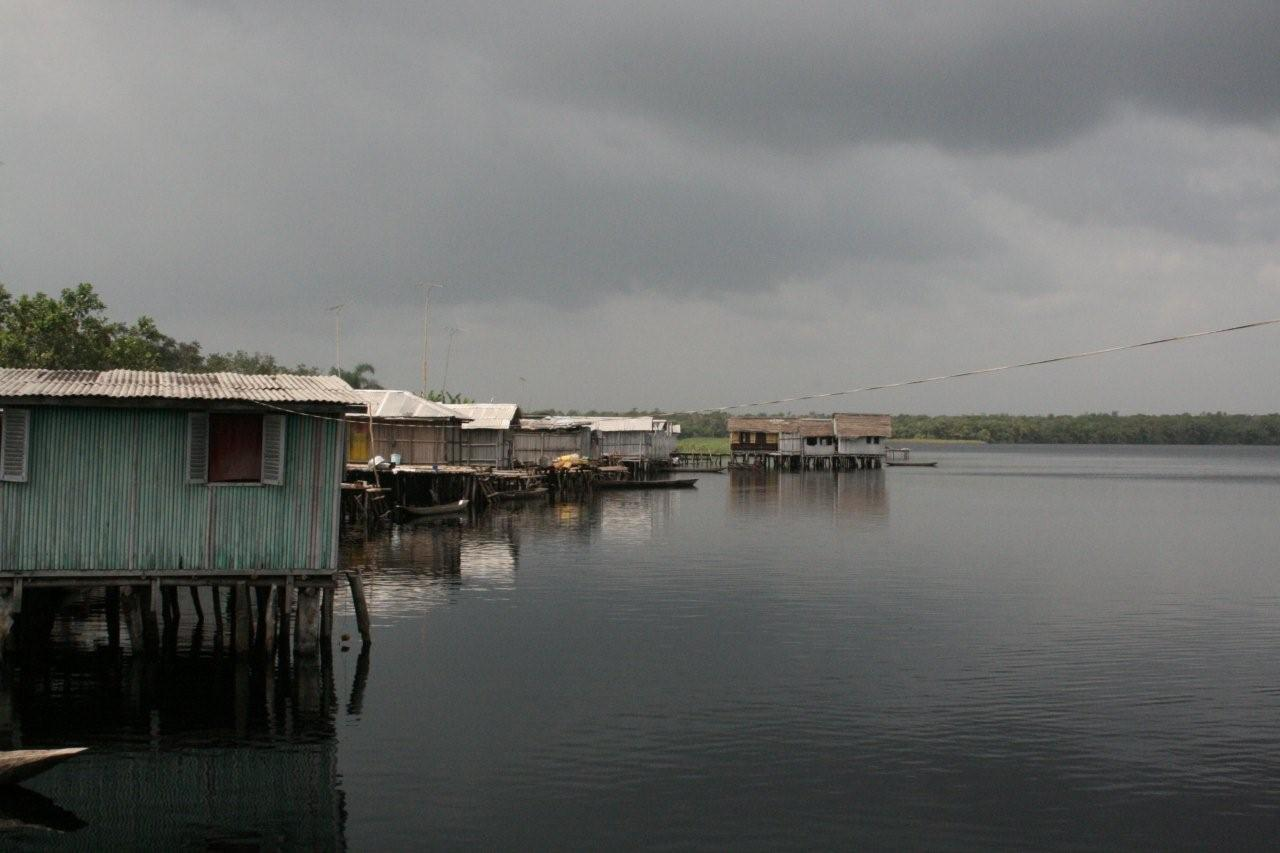
Nzulezo village

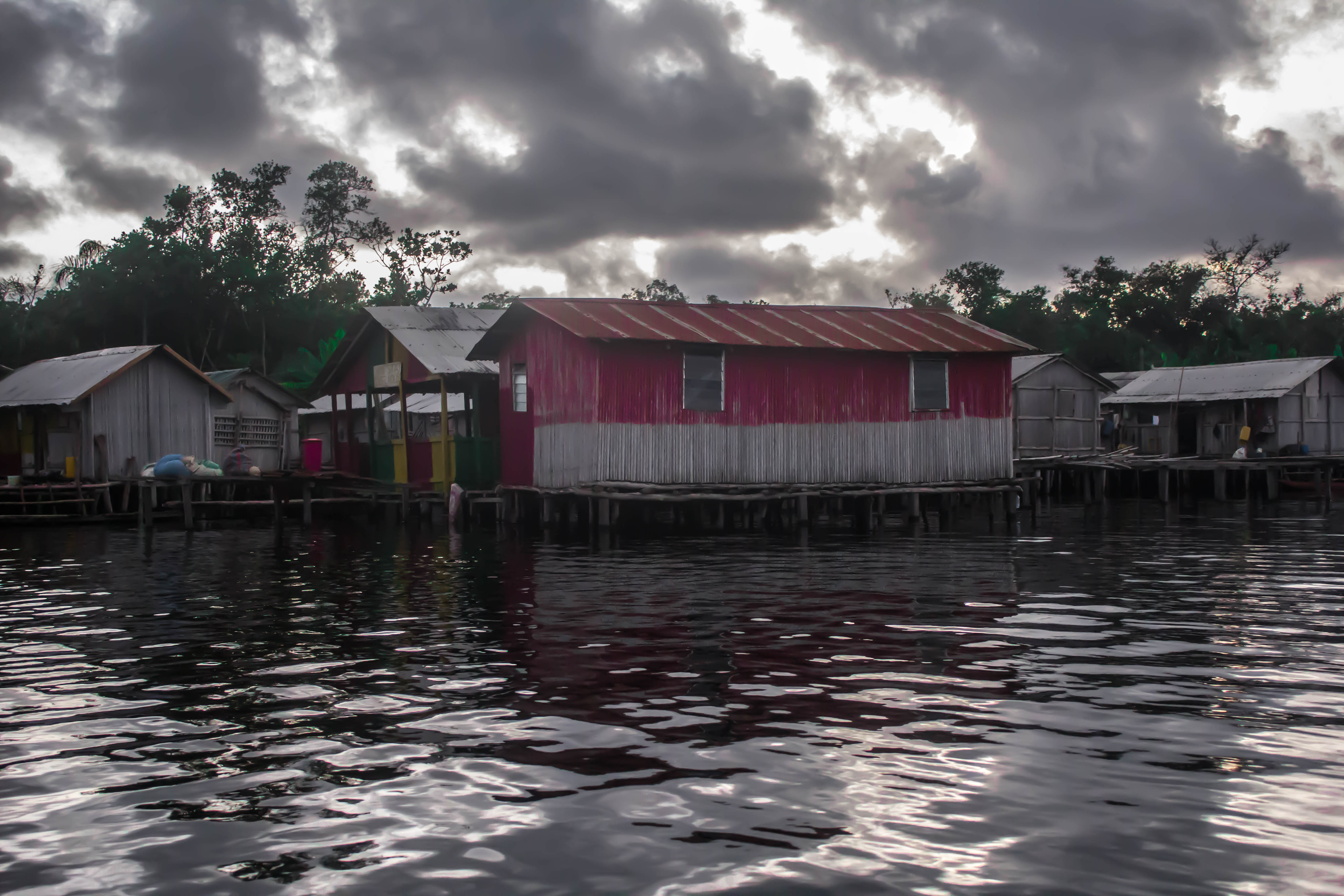
Nzulezo village

Nzulezo is a village located near the village of Beyin, 90 kilometers west of Takoradi, in the Jomoro District in the Western Region of Ghana. Nzuleso can also be spelt as "Nzulezu". Over 500 people live in the community.

Nzulezu overlooks Lake Tadane, and is entirely made up of stilts and platforms. In 2000, it was nominated as a UNESCO World Heritage Site, and is a major tourist attraction area. The site is increasingly a source of tourism, with tourist coming to experience the village as well as a local alcohol produced in the village.

== Etymology ==
The name "Nzulezo" in the Nzema language means "water surface", and is a village on stilts of "Ewuture" origin situated close to the northwest shore. The "Ewuture" maintained the waterways and transportation of goods and people. According to local legend, the village was built by a group of people from Oualata, a city in the ancient Ghana Empire and in present-day Mauritania, which came about from following a snail.

== Construction ==
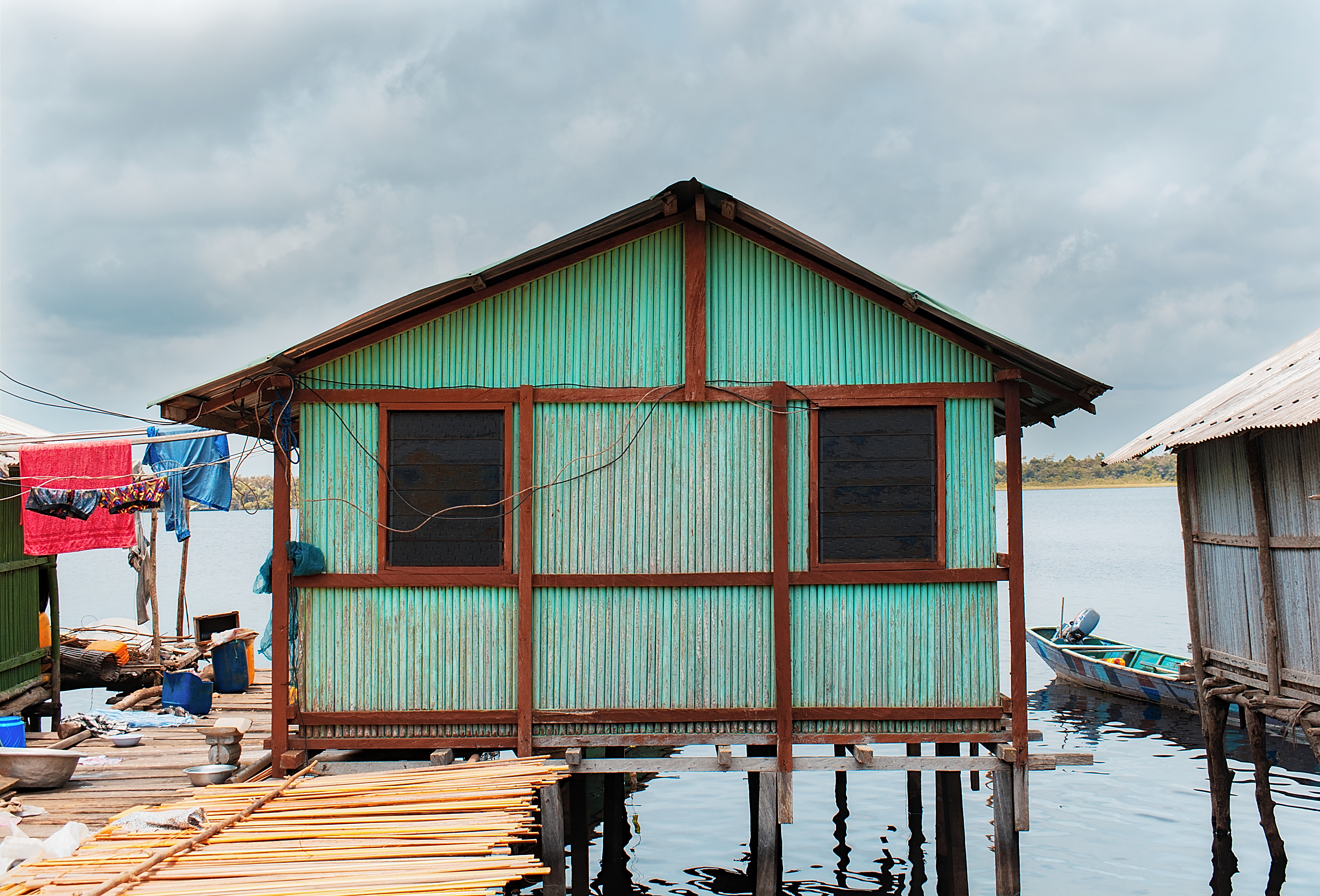
A house built over Lake Tadane.

Nzulezu was built over Lake Tadane. The settlement of Nzulezo consists of stilt-supported structures.

The reason Nzulezo was built over water was for protection and safety during attacks in times of war since it lies five miles inland of the Southwest shores.

The main activities of its inhabitants is agriculture, while fishery plays a secondary role. The lake is perceived by the local population to protect against certain risks (e.g. a fire). The village did have some of the houses partially submerged from a flood in 2009.

== World Heritage Status ==
This site was added to the UNESCO World Heritage Tentative List on January 17, 2000, in the Cultural category.

The village was nominated to become a World Heritage Site for its importance in anthropology: in addition to being one of the few ancient settlements on stilts and platforms left in the world, there is a preserved wealth of local traditions connected with the cult of the lake. Lake Tadane occurs on the banks of all religious rites, and Thursday, is a day sacred to the lake, and it is forbidden to use and work on the lake for any activity throughout the day of Thursday.

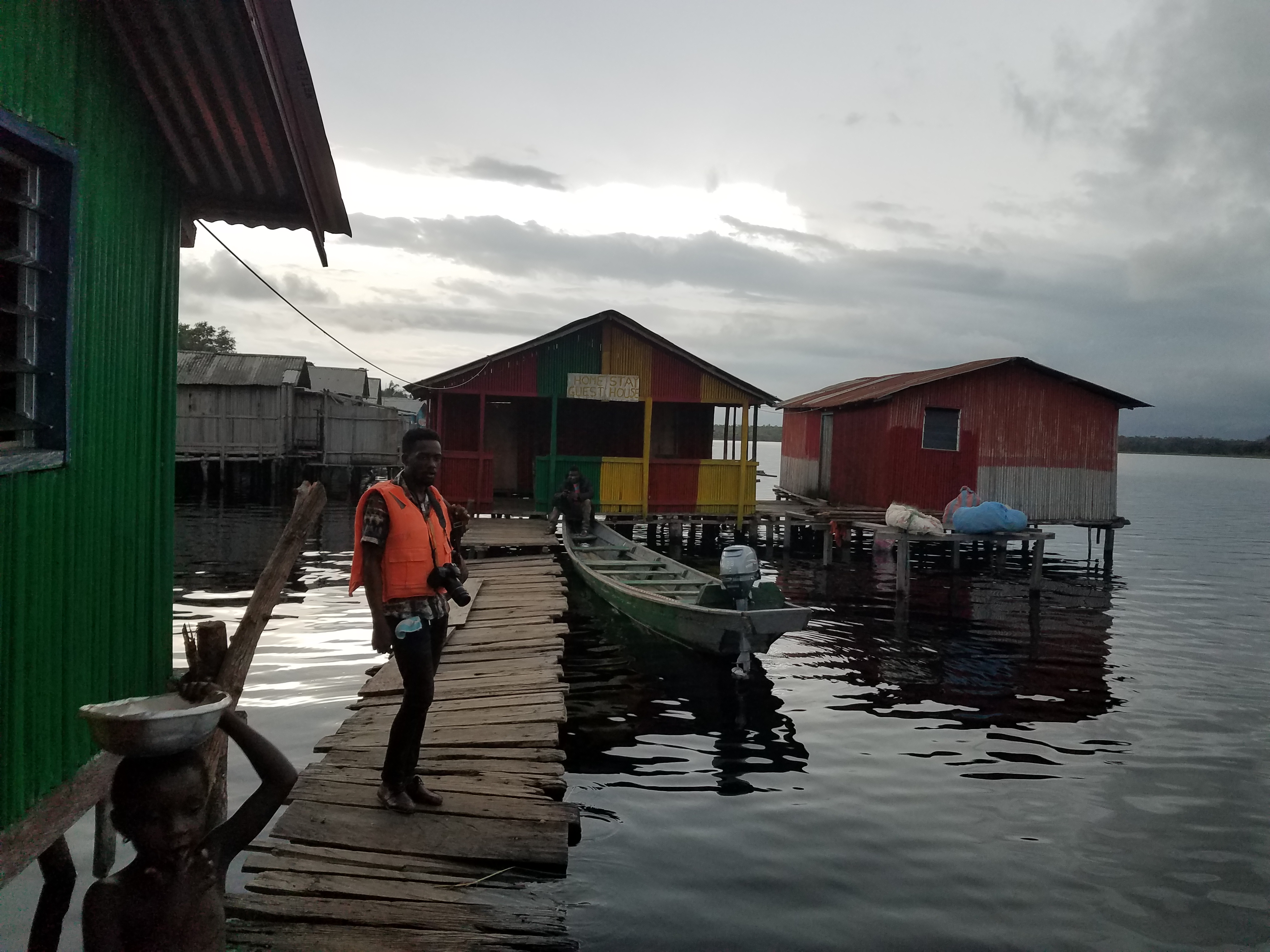
Nzulezo Canoe Transport

In recent times the village has been opened to tourism, but with certain constraints (visitations are allowed only once a week). The village can be reached only by canoe; the 5 km journey, which crosses the rain forest, takes about an hour. In the village there is a church and a school. As the village is extremely isolated, Nzulezo suffers from numerous health problems, including the vast spread of malaria.

== Gallery ==
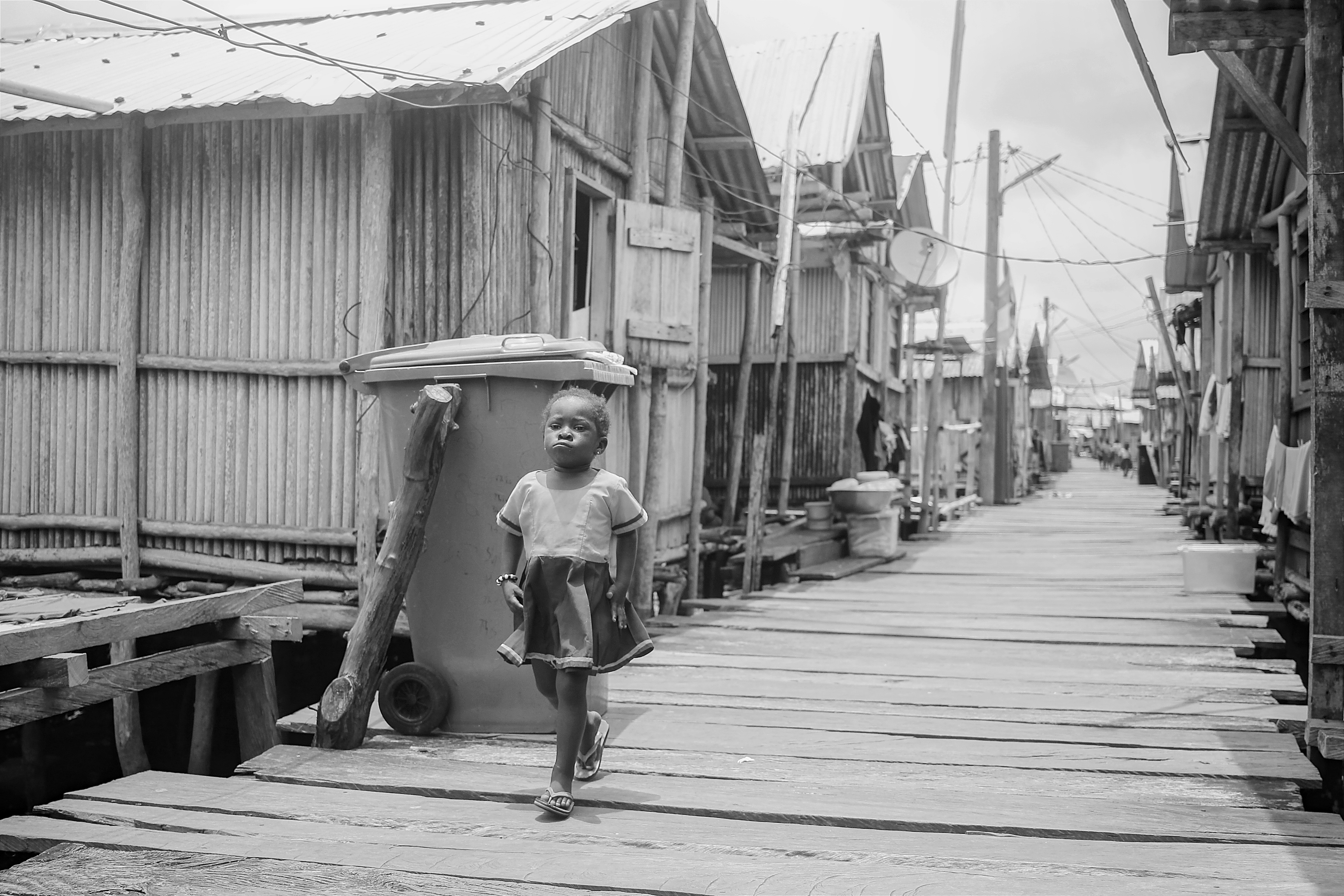
Nzulezo bamboo house community

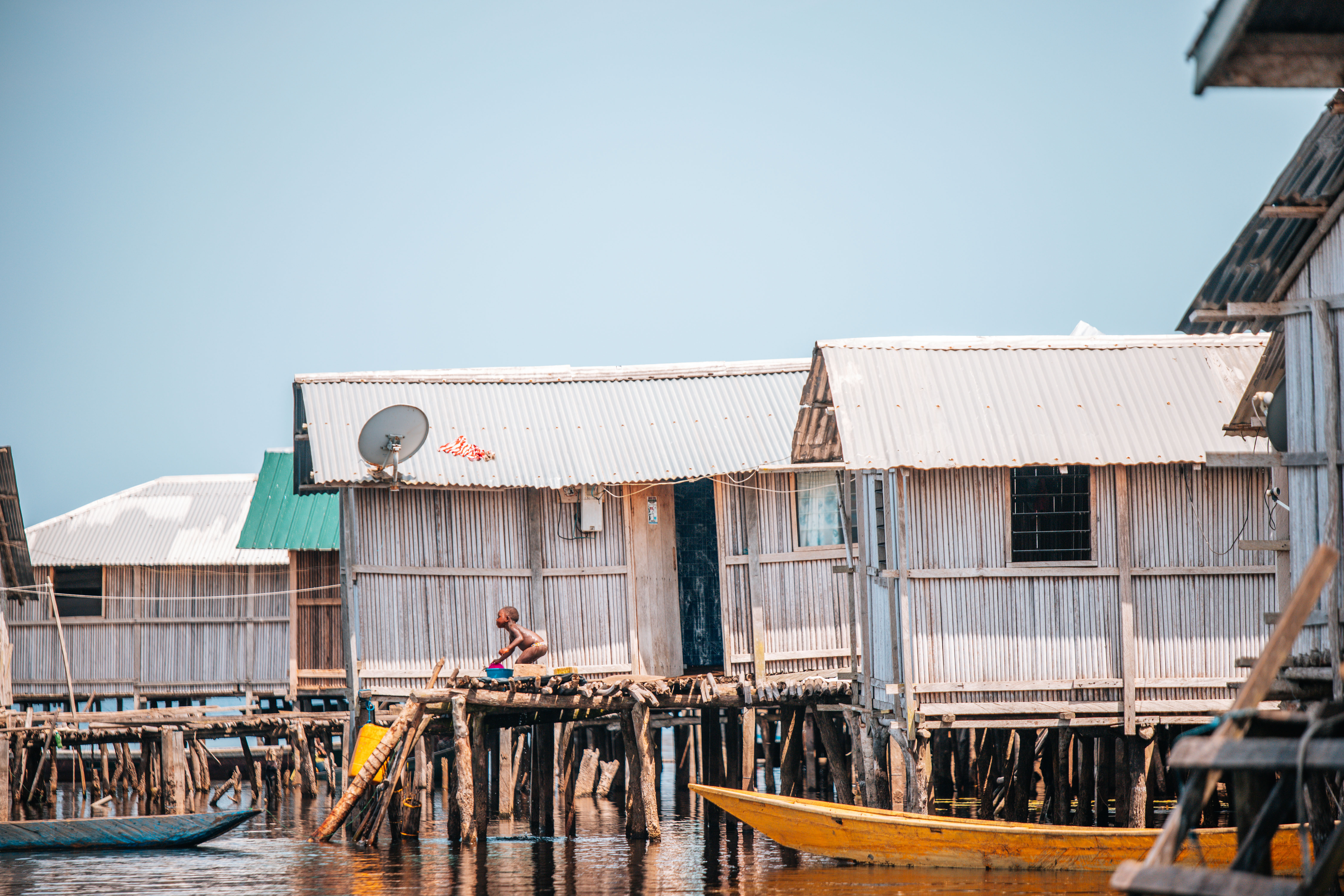
Nzulezo at daytime
