= William Owuraku Aidoo =

Ghanaian politician

Hon. William Owuraku Aidoo
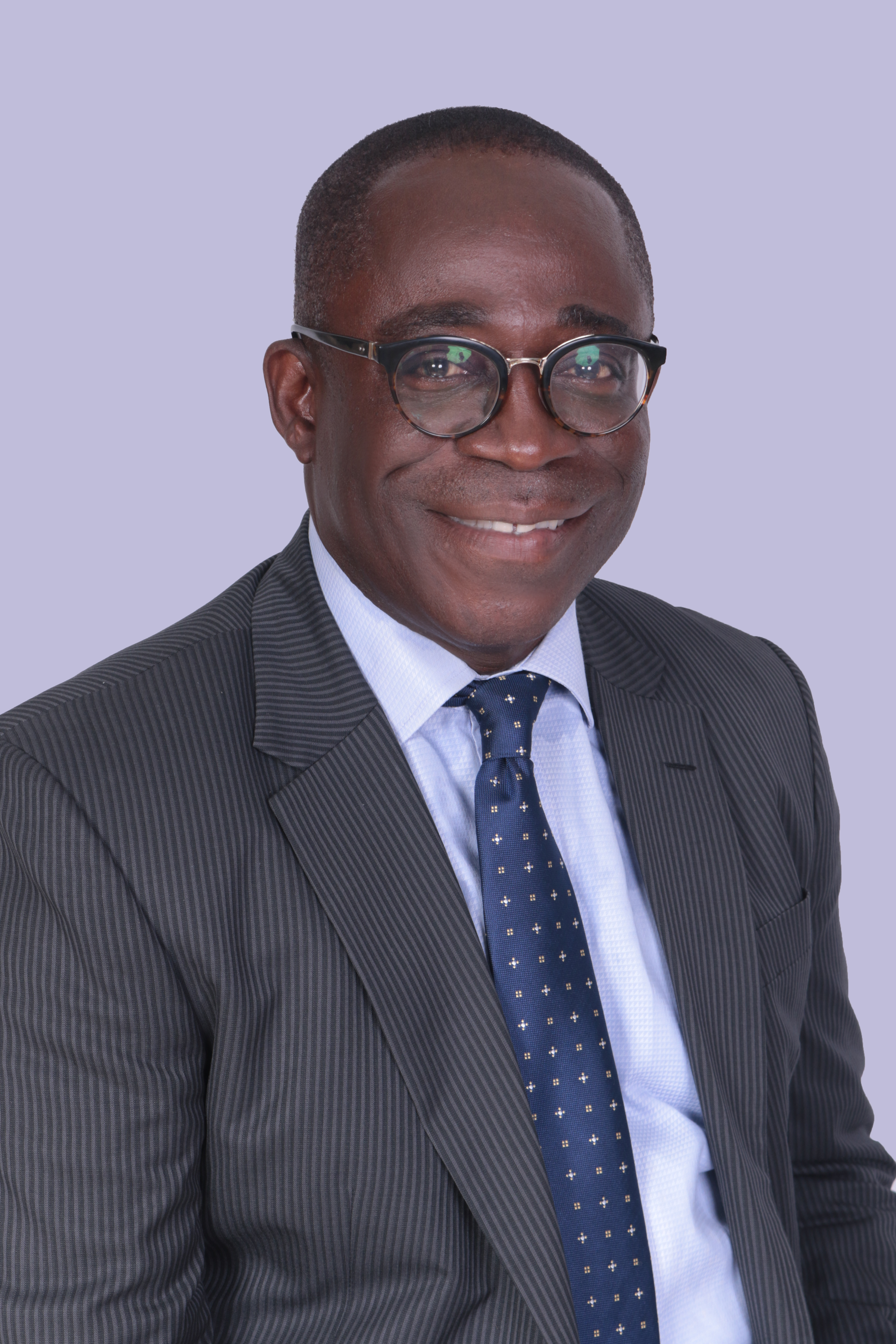

Deputy Minister for Energy, Member of Parliament for Afigya Kwabre South Constituency
- In office 7 January 2021 – 6 January 2025
- Preceded by: William Owuraku Aidoo
- Succeeded by: Damata Ama Appianimaa Salam

Personal details
- Born: 1 January 1970 (age 56) Hemang-Kwabre, Ghana
- Party: New Patriotic Party
- Education: Ghana Institute of Management and Public Administration (GIMPA)
- Occupation: Politician
- Committees: Subsidiary Legislation Committee, Constitutional, Legal and Parliamentary Affairs Committee

William Owuraku Aidoo (born 30 January 1964) is a Ghanaian politician and was a member of the Seventh Parliament of the Fourth Republic of Ghana and the 8th Parliament of the Fourth republic of Ghana, representing the Afigya Kwabre South Constituency in the Ashanti Region on the ticket of the New Patriotic Party.

== Early life and education ==
William Owuraku Aidoo was born on 30 January 1964. He hails from Hemang-Kwabre in the Ashanti Region of Ghana. He got his GCE O Level from Tetrem Secondary School and A Level certificate from St Augustine's College. He received his Bachelor of Arts degree in Entrepreneurship from the Ghana Institute of Management and Public Administration (GIMPA) in 2005.

== Career ==
William Owuraku Aidoo is an energy consultant and a farmer. Prior to entering politics, he was the managing director of Kucons Company Limited, a construction company involved in the construction and rehabilitation of dams. He was a Senior Superintendent at the Ghana Education Service (GES) between 1991 and 1994 and a Senior Manager at the Ghana Commercial Bank (GCB) from 1995 until 2012. While working at the bank, he doubled as a lecturer at the University of Education, Winneba from 2009 to 2012. As a farmer, he won the national best farmer award for cashew production in Ghana in 2011.

== Politics ==
William Owuraku Aidoo entered parliament on 7 January 2013 as the representative of the Afigya Kwabre South constituency on the ticket of the New Patriotic Party. He contested the seat again during the 2016 parliamentary elections and won. William was reelected again in the 2020 General election for the 8th Parliament of the Fourth Republic of Ghana. He is currently the deputy Minister for Energy.

=== Committees ===
William is a member of Constitutional, Legal and Parliamentary Affairs Committee and also a member of Subsidiary Legislation Committee.

== Personal life ==
William Owuraku Aidoo is married with five children. He identifies as Christian and is a member of the Catholic Church.
