= Boamang =

District capital in Ashanti Region, Ghana

Boamang Boaman
- Town
- Location of Boamang in Ashanti Region, Ghana Boamang (Africa)
- Coordinates: 6.56°N 1.37°W
- Country: Ghana
- Region: Ashanti Region
- Metropolitan: Afigya Kwabre North District
- Time zone: GMT
  - Summer (DST): GMT

Boamang (also known as Boaman), is the district capital of the Afigya Kwabre North District in the Ashanti Region of Ghana.

== Institutions ==
- Nkwantakese DA JHS
