= Kwabre District =

- Former District
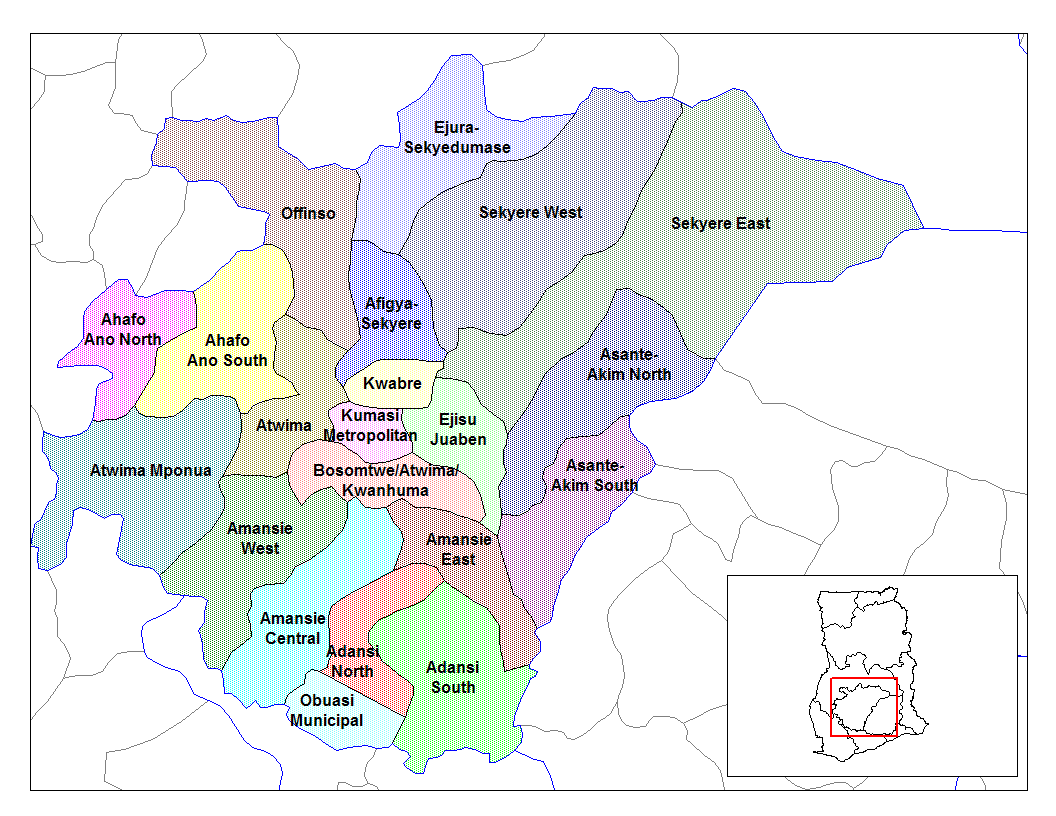
- Districts of Ashanti Region

- Location of Kwabre District within Ashanti
- Coordinates: 6°44′N 1°33′W
- Country: Ghana
- Region: Ashanti
- Capital: Mamponteng

Government
  - District Executive: Alhaji Kwesi Yeboah

Area
  - Total: 356 km^{2} (137 sq mi)

Population (2012)
  - Total: —
- Time zone: UTC+0 (GMT)
- Website: www.adanwomase.com

Kwabre District is a former district that was located in Ashanti Region of Ghana. It was originally created as an ordinary district assembly in 1988 by the former Kwabre-Sekyere District Council. The western part of the district was split off to become the southern portion of Afigya-Kwabre District on 1 November 2007 (effectively 29 February 2008). The remaining portion has since been officially renamed as Kwabre East District and it was elevated to municipal district assembly status, becoming Kwabre East Municipal District on 1 November 2017 (effectively 15 March 2018). The district assembly was located in the northern part of Ashanti Region and had Mamponteng as its capital town.

== Sources ==
- "Districts of Ghana". Statoids.
- GhanaDistricts.com
