= Ekuona =

One of the eight Akan clans

Ekuona is one of the eight major Akan clans.

== Totem ==
The totem of the Ekuona people is the buffalo.

== Major towns ==
The major towns of the Ekuona include Adansi Berekum, Asokore Mampong Duayaw Nkwanta Asokore, Kokofu Asamang, Afare, Pekyi, Berekum etc.
