= Afigya Kwabre District =

- Former District
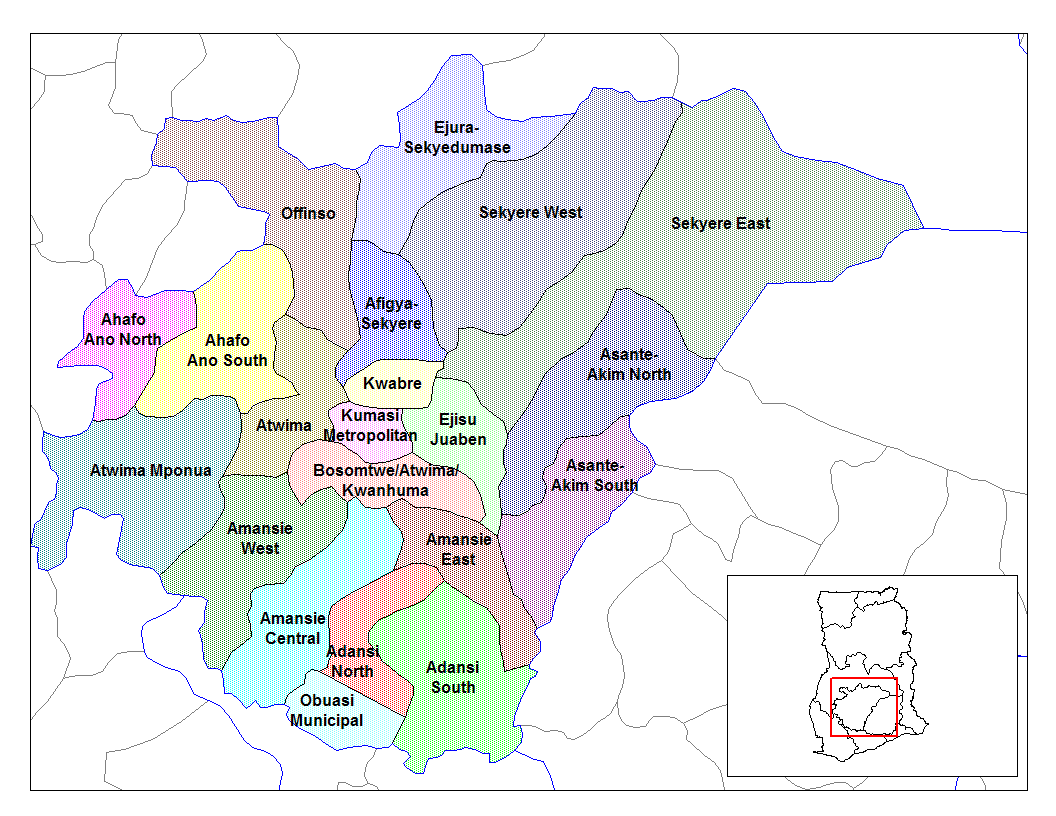
- Districts of Ashanti Region

- Location of Afigya Kwabre District within Ashanti
- Coordinates: 6°44′N 1°37′W
- Country: Ghana
- Region: Ashanti
- Capital: Kodie

Government
  - District Executive: Hon. Kwasi Karikari Acheamfuor
  - Succeeded: Hon. Kaakyire Oppong Kyekyeku

Population (2012)
  - Total: —
- Time zone: UTC+0 (GMT)
- ISO 3166 code: GH-AS-__

Afigya Kwabre District is a former district that was located in Ashanti Region, Ghana. It was created from the western portion of Afigya-Sekyere District (now currently known as Sekyere South District) and the western portion of Kwabre District (now currently known as Kwabre East Municipal District) on 1 November 2007 (effectively 29 February 2008). However on 15 March 2018, it was split into two new districts: Afigya Kwabre South District (capital: Kodie) and Afigya Kwabre North District (capital: Boamang). The district assembly was the northern part of Ashanti Region and had Kodie as its capital town.
