= Adanwomase =

- Village
- Location within Ghana
- Coordinates: 6°46′54″N 1°37′53″W
- Country: Ghana
- Region: Ashanti Region
- District: Kwabre East District
- Elevation: 712 ft (217 m)
- Time zone: GMT
  - Summer (DST): GMT

Adanwomase is a town in the Ashanti Region of Ghana located in Kwabre East District. Adanwomase is about 27 kilometers northeast of Kumasi. It is noted for Kente weaving with towns like Bonwire which is about 2 kilometers away. The town is also known for the Adanwomase Secondary School. The town also has a mini Kente weaving museum.

== History ==
In 1697, the Ashanti King, desiring hand-woven cloth, commissioned one of his sub-chiefs, the Akyimpimhene, to send people from the towns of Adanwomase, Asotwe, Bonwire, and Wonoo to study strip-weaving in Bontuku, a small village in present-day Ivory Coast. When they returned, the apprentices were given swatches of fabric with specific patterns on them that they were told to study and be able to recreate on demand. These patterns were called Sesea and are considered to be the first examples of true Ashanti Kente Cloth. The original centuries-old Sesea swatches are to this day kept in the Kente Chief's house in Adanwomase.

Since the first apprentices returned from Bontuku, Adanwomase has been the royal weaving village for the Ashanti King. The apprentices spread the art of Kente-weaving to their friends and families and in the process added their own designs and colors, creating the cloth that today is recognized worldwide as Ashanti Kente.

== Present day and kente weaving ==
Theora Video of Akan Kente clothing tailor preparing Kente attire in Adanwomase Kente village, Ashanti.

To this day, Adanwomase carries on the centuries-old Kente-weaving tradition. Under the guidance of the Kente Chief, Adanwomase weavers continue to weave cloths for the Ashanti King, royals, and anyone in the world who appreciates the history and cultural significance woven into Ashanti Kente. The town takes its name from the Adanwo tree. The name Adanwomase means under the Adanwo tree in Asante Twi dialect.

Adanwomase is also well known for the traditional Kente cloth weaving. Although there are a variety of oral histories concerning the origins of Kente Cloth, historians and scholars agree that Kente Cloth production is an extension of centuries of strip-weaving in West Africa. Strip-weaving has existed in West Africa since the 11th century. Most scholars believe that the art form was developed in present-day Bonoman or Brong-Ahafo Region and spread throughout West Africa through trade and migration.
