= Kwabre East Municipal District =

- Municipal District
- Districts of Ashanti Region

- Location of Kwabre East Municipal District within Ashanti
- Coordinates: 6°44′N 1°33′W
- Country: Ghana
- Region: Ashanti
- Capital: Mamponteng

Government
  - Municipal Chief Executive: Alhaji Kwesi Yeboah

Area
  - Total: 356 km^{2} (137 sq mi)

Population (2021)
  - Total: 296,814
  - Density: 834/km^{2} (2,160/sq mi)
- Time zone: UTC+0 (GMT)

Kwabre East Municipal District is one of the forty-three districts in Ashanti Region, Ghana. Originally created as an ordinary district assembly in 1988 when it was known as Kwabre District, after it was created from part of the former Kwabre-Sekyere District Council; until the western part of the district was split off to become the southern portion of Afigya-Kwabre District on 1 November 2007 (effectively 29 February 2008); while the remaining portion has since then been officially renamed as Kwabre East District, which it was elevated to municipal district assembly status to become Kwabre East Municipal District on 1 November 2017 (effectively 15 March 2018). The municipality is located in the northern part of Ashanti Region and had Mamponteng as its capital town.
