= Elizabeth Agyemang =

Ghanaian politician (born 1949)

Hon. Elizabeth Agyemang

Deputy Ashanti Regional Minister
- Incumbent
- Assumed office March 2017
- President: Nana Akufo-Addo

Member of Parliament for Oforikrom Constituency
- In office 7 January 2005 – 6 January 2013
- Preceded by: New
- Succeeded by: Emmanuel Marfo

Personal details
- Born: 13 May 1949 (age 77)
- Party: New Patriotic Party
- Children: 3
- Education: Alexandria Hospital, Virginia
- Profession: Nurse/ Self-employed

Elizabeth Agyemang (born 13 May 1949) is a Ghanaian politician and was a member of the Parliament of Ghana. She represented Oforikrom in the Ashanti region of Ghana. She is a member of the New Patriotic Party and the Deputy Minister of the Ashanti Region of Ghana.

== Early life and education ==
Agyemang was born in Kotei in the Ashanti Region of Ghana. She holds a teacher’s certificate ‘A’. She acquired the certificate in 1971. She also received nursing certificate from the Alexandria Hospital in Virginia, USA. This was in 1989.

== Career ==
From January 2005 to January 2017, Elizabeth represented the Oforikrom constituency in the Ashanti region of Ghana. She won her parliamentary seat by securing 58,812 votes out of 90,333 valid votes cast in her constituency.

In March 2017, President Nana Akufo-Addo, named her one of the ten deputy regional ministers who would form part of his government. She was vetted by the Appointments Committee of the Parliament of Ghana in the same month. She was approved by the committee and her name was forwarded to Speaker of Parliament for further approval by the general house of parliament.

== Elections ==
Agyemang was elected as the member of parliament for the Oforikrom constituency of the Ashanti Region of Ghana for the first time in the 2004 Ghanaian general elections. She won on the ticket of the New Patriotic Party. Her constituency was a part of the 36 parliamentary seats out of 39 seats won by the New Patriotic Party in that election for the Ashanti Region. The New Patriotic Party won a majority total of 128 parliamentary seats out of 230 seats. She was elected with 47,388 votes out of 71,594 total valid votes cast. This was equivalent to 66.2% of total valid votes cast. She was elected over Minir Abdullah Dawood of the People's National Convention, Abofra George Cudjoe of the National Democratic Congress and Adelaide Borden of the Convention People's Party. These obtained 2,516, 21,056 and 634 votes respectively of the total valid votes cast. These were equivalent to 3.5%, 66.2%, 29.4% and 0.9% respectively of total valid votes cast.

In 2008, she won the general elections on the ticket of the New Patriotic Party for the same constituency. Her constituency was part of the 34 parliamentary seats out of 39 seats won by the New Patriotic Party in that election for the Ashanti Region. The New Patriotic Party won a minority total of 109 parliamentary seats out of 230 seats. She was elected with 40,704 votes out of 64,538 total valid votes cast. This was equivalent to 63.07% of total valid votes cast. She was elected over Munir Abdullah Dawood of the People's National Convention, Terlabi Ebenezer Okletey of the National Democratic Congress and Afful Hayfor of the Convention People’s Party. These obtained 1,120, 21,572 and 1,142 votes respectively out of the total valid votes cast. These were equivalent to 1.74%, 33.43% and 1.77% respectively of the total votes cast.

In 2012, she won the general elections once again for the same constituency. She was elected with 58,812 votes out of 90,333 total valid votes cast. This was equivalent to 65.11% of total valid votes cast. She was elected over Awidu Gariba of the National Democratic Congress, Raphael Brobbey of the Progressive People's Party, Salifu Zakari of the Convention People's Party, Faustina Adjei of the National Democratic Party and Nana Osei Tutu Prempeh an independent candidate. These obtained 29,393, 1,246, 311, 419 and 152 votes respectively of the total valid votes cast. These were equivalent to 32.54%, 1.38%, 0.34%, 0.46% and 0.17% respectively of the total votes cast.

== Personal life ==
Agyemang is married with three children. She identifies as a Christian.
