= Emmanuel Marfo =

Ghanaian politician

Hon. Dr. Emmanuel Marfo MP
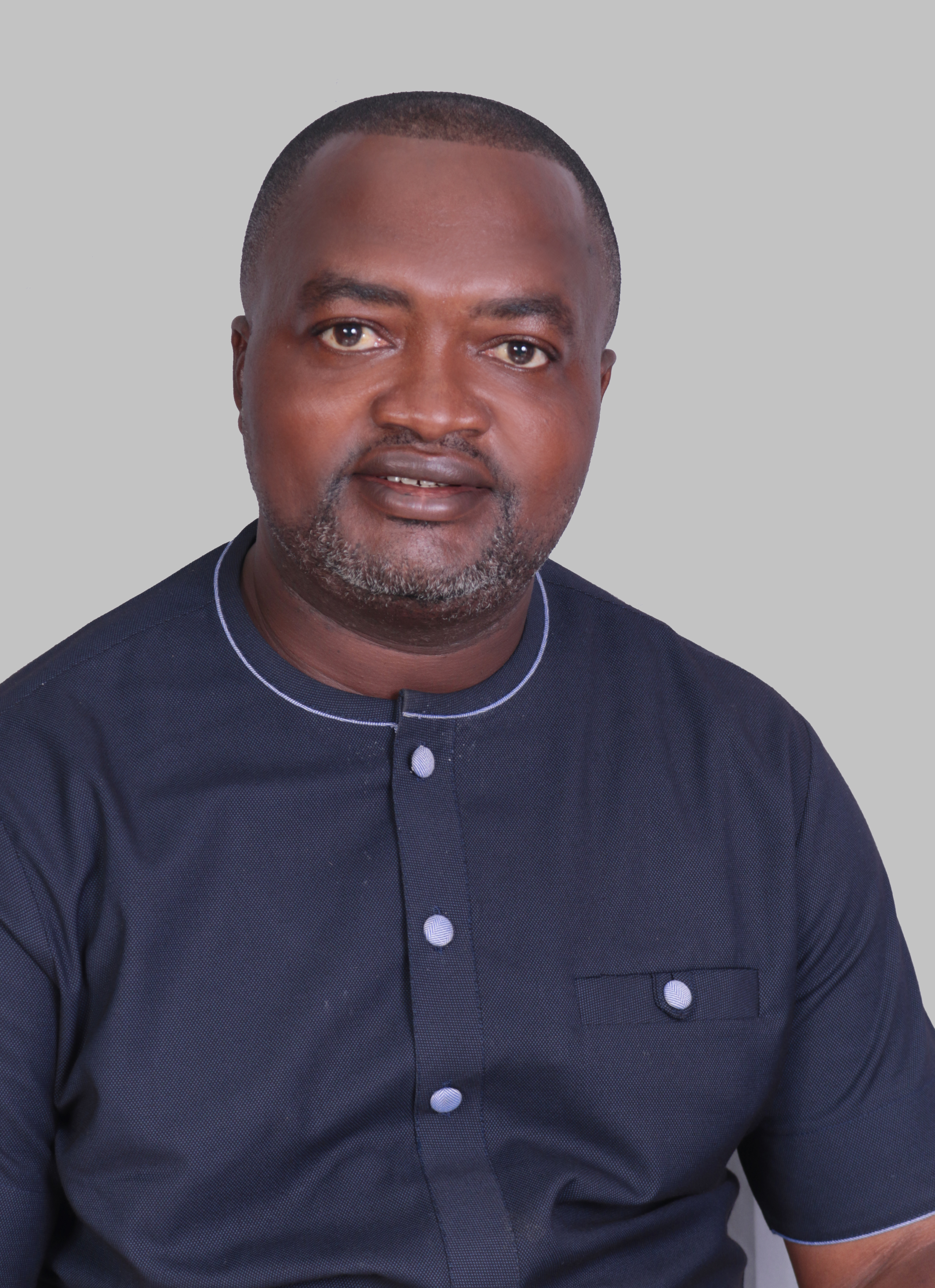

MP for Oforikrom Constituency
- Incumbent
- Assumed office 2013
- In office April 2017 – 6 January 2025
- President: Nana Akuffo-Addo
- Succeeded by: Michael Kwasi Aidoo

Personal details
- Born: Emmanuel Kwabena Marfo; 27 July 1973 (age 53) Bonwire, Ghana
- Party: New Patriotic Party
- Education: KNUST, Wageningen University, Netherlands
- Occupation: Politician
- Profession: Principal Scientist
- Committees: Environment, Science and Technology Committee (Chairperson); Gender and Children Committee; Members Holding Offices of Profit Committee and Roads and Transport Committee

Emmanuel Kwabena Marfo (born 27 July 1973) is a Ghanaian politician who was a member of the Seventh Parliament of the Fourth Republic of Ghana and currently a member of the Eighth Parliament of the Fourth Republic of Ghana representing the Oforikrom Constituency in the Ashanti Region of Ghana on the ticket of the New Patriotic Party. He is a member of the Forest Plantation Development Fund Management Board.

== Early life and education ==
Marfo was born and hails from Bonwire in the Ashanti Region of Ghana. He obtained his Bachelor of Sciences (BSc) in natural resource management (forestry) and Masters of Sciences (MSc) in forest policy from the Kwame Nkrumah University of Science and Technology (KNUST) in the year 1997 and 2001 respectively. He again had his Doctor of Philosophy (PHD) in environmental policy from the Wageningen University, Netherlands, in the year 2006.

== Career ==
Marfo was the principal scientist for The Council of Scientific & Industrial Research(CSIR) - (Forestry Research Institute) at Fumesua, Kumasi, in the Ashanti Region of Ghana.

Marfo is now working as the member of parliament (MP) for Oforikrom Constituency in the Ashanti Region of Ghana on the ticket of the New Patriotic Party.

== Political life ==
Marfo contested and won the 2016 NPP parliamentary primaries for Oforikrom Constituency in the Ashanti Region of Ghana. In the 2020 Ghanaian general elections, he retained the Oforikrom Constituency parliamentary seat with 60,156 votes whilst the NDC parliamentary candidate Henry Osei Akoto had 24,747 votes and the PNC parliamentary candidate Muniru Seidu had 545 votes.

=== Committees ===
Marfo is the chairperson of the Environment, Science and Technology Committee; a member of the Gender and Children Committee; a member of the Members Holding Offices of Profit Committee and a member of the Roads and Transport Committee.

== Personal life ==
Marfo is a Christian.
