= Building and Road Research Institute =

- Abbreviation: BRRI
- Formation: 1952, in Accra, Ghana
- Type: Government Agency
- Legal status: active
- Headquarters: Fumesua, Kumasi, Ashanti
- Parent organization: Council for Scientific and Industrial Research
- Website: www.brri.org

The Building and Road Research Institute (BRRI) is a research Institute under the Council for Scientific and Industrial Research of Ghana. It is based in Kumasi in the Ashanti Region of Ghana. BRRI is a research institute.

== History ==
The institute was established in 1952 and was known as the West African Building Research Institute in Accra. It was made up of building engineers from Ghana and Nigeria. The institute had a name change in 1960 when the institute's members from Nigeria left to form the Nigerian Building and Road Research Institute. This was because Nigeria had gained independence from Britain. It became known as the Building Research Institute of the Ghana Academy of Arts and Sciences. The institute relocated to the campus of the Kwame Nkrumah University of Science and Technology in Kumasi in 1963. This was to allow the institute's members to lecture at the university due to university under-staffing.

== Professional bodies of the institute ==
The institute is made up of various professional groupings. They include architects, engineers, planners, quantity surveyors.

== Mandate and name change ==
In 1964 the government of Ghana expanded the functions of the institution to include road research. The name of the institution was changed to include the new function to the Building and Road Research Institute.

== Relocation ==
In 1995, the institute moved from the KNUST campus to it present site at Fumesua in Kumasi. The new site which is about 20 kilometres from the institute's former location is called the Kumasi Science City. It houses research institutions in Kumasi. The other institutions include the Forestry Research Institute of Ghana (FORIG) and the Crops Research Institute (CRI).

== Aim of the institute ==
The institute was established as a research and development organisation in the construction industry with the purposes of offering research and development products and services to the building and road sectors for the development of Ghana.

== Researches ==
The institute works on developing alternative building materials that last longer and cost cheaper for the Ghanaian building industry.

=== Pozzolana Cement ===
The institute in the 1990s begun researching into Pozzolana cement, an alternative cement to the Portland cement for building. Pozzolana cement cost less than Portland cement. In May, 2007, BRRI and PMC Global Incorporated of America signed a contract for the commercial production of Pozzolana. The agreement included PMC offering 150,000 dollars to BRRI for expansion of the pilot plant for the production of the pozzolana at the institute and land acquisition for the building of a plant by PMC for the production process.

== Collaborations ==
BRRI has research collaboration with other state and foreign agencies. In 2007, BRRI and the Transport and Road Research Laboratory (TRRL) of the United Kingdom worked together on a program of national studies in Ghana for two years. The purpose of the collaboration was to research into developing building materials that would benefit both bodies. In 2009, the institutes and its Nigerian counterpart (NBRRI) signed a memorandum of understanding to research into building and road construction materials.
