= Anwomaso =

Coordinates: 6°42′N 1°32′W

- Town
- Interactive map of Anwomaso
- Country: Ghana
- Time zone: UTC+0 (Casablanca)

Anwomaso is a town in Ghana. It is 15 kilometres from the centre of Kumasi. It is a dormitory town. It serves mainly as a residential area for workers in various companies in Kumasi. It served as a pilot study town for the Building and Road Research Institute of Ghana on termite infestation.

== Boundaries ==
The town is bordered on the north by KNUST campus, to the West by Fumesua, to the east by Kentinkrono and to the South by Oduom.
