= St. Louis Senior High School (Ghana) =

St. Louis Senior High School (Kumasi, Ghana)

Location
- P. O. Box KS 460, Kumasi; Oduom, Ashanti Region; Ghana; 6.6950°N 1.5451°W

Information
- Type: Public high school
- Motto: UT-SINT-UNUM DIEU LE VEULT
- Religious affiliation: Roman Catholic
- Denomination: Catholic
- Established: 1952 (74 years ago)
- Founder: St. Louis Sisters
- Status: Active
- Oversight: Ministry of Education
- Headmistress: Mrs. Ama Kyerewaa Benefo
- Chaplain: Rev. Fr. Eric Ankapong
- Grades: A1 to F9
- Gender: Females
- Age range: 11-19
- Average class size: 55
- Education system: Boarding school
- Language: English
- Campus type: B
- Houses: Our Lady of Fatima House, St. Mary's House, St. Joseph's House (Upstairs), St. Joseph's House (Downstairs), St. Charles Luanga House, St. Martins De Porres House, Mary Joannes House (Upstairs), Mary Joannes House (Downstairs), St. Scholastica House (Main), St. Scholastica House (Annex), St. Josephine Bahkita and St. Catherine of Sienna House
- Colours: Green and white
- Slogan: A school of distinction, The Pacesetters
- Sports: Hockey, Javelin, Shot Put and Long jump
- Nickname: Louis
- Rival: Yaa Asantewaa Girls' Senior High School
- Accreditation: Ghana Education Service
- Affiliation: Opoku Ware School (Akatakyie)
- Alumni: SLOPSA( St.Louis Past Students Association)
- Website: stlouisshs.edu.gh

St. Louis Senior High School is a Ghanaian educational institution for girls in the Oduom suburb of Kumasi in the Ashanti Region. It is the first girls' School in Ghana, founded by the sisters of the sacred Heart of Jesus in 1949.

== History ==
Most Rev. Hubert Pailissen, SMA, in early 1949, said; "In this country, scarcely 15 percent of the school-going youth are girls. The people now begin to realize that more must be done in favour of this much–neglected part of the human race, and the chiefs, conscious of their duty towards their subjects, asked us to establish schools for girls in their respective villages…. But to obtain results, it is necessary that the direction of girls' schools should be in the hands of 'Sisters of a Teaching Order' with the necessary experience in the latest development of pedagogic methods."

Hence, on 18 October 1947, the first St. Louis Sisters arrived in the country. They were to continue the running of an already-established elementary school, the St. Bernadette School, now popularly called 'Roman Girls'. True to character, the St. Louis Sisters, who never do things by the halves, decided to establish a new secondary school on the same compound.

In 1952, St. Louis Secondary was opened, with an initial group of 12 girls. Only some out of this group survived to join the second group of 1953 to make 42. By December 1957, when the surviving group wrote their "O" Level Examination, they numbered 11.

Most of the salaries of the Sisters, funds raised, and Diocesan contributions went into developing the compound and acquiring necessary inputs.

The church wanted the Apostolate of Education to develop the essential task of forming strong and enlightened Christians, capable of exercising much influence in social and political affairs. Perhaps, there is no branch that needed more attention than female education.

Long before "Girl child" education became a popular slogan, the Catholic Church and St. Louis understood the depth of its importance. That is why the St. Louis Sisters and the Church always adopted an holistic approach to education.

Despite staffing and financial difficulties, the student population continued to grow. It was clear that further accommodation had to be provided; a site was given through Asantehene Nana Osei Agyemang Prempeh II, and funds were provided by both the Diocese and the Sisters.

Succeeding reports of inspectors testified to the excellence of teaching given by the Sisters. These reports paid tribute to the school's "air of efficiency" and its "very good organization and discipline". It was upon these commendations that the Ministry of Education, in 1960, wished the Sisters would open a Training College on the site on which St. Louis Secondary School now stands. That same year, 1960, a change-over took place, and St. Louis Secondary School moved to its present site. The foundation stone was laid by Otumfuo Osei Agyemang Prempeh II, Asantehene, on 25 March 1960 (the feast of Annunciation) and was blessed by Andrew van den Bronk (SMA), Bishop of Kumasi.

In the same year, the Sixth Form Arts class began with five students. In 1964, the Administration Block was built and dedicated appropriately to the "Annunciation" (for we have good news to tell). More buildings were put up to meet the school's expanding needs. In 1964, the Sixth Form Science stream was started. There was the planting of shrubs, shade trees, and general landscaping with Sr. Aideen. Today, the school has many more buildings, including a library complex.

== Community outreach ==
To attend the shortage of missionary priests and nuns, the students formed a strong lay apostolate to go to the outlying compounds to teach catechism, prepare candidates for baptism, and visit lapsed Christians to persuade them to return. Students also got an opportunity to broaden their outlook by visiting neighbouring countries.

In the early 1970s the school began admitting boys into Sixth Form. This continued until the early 1980s when the program ended due to the problem of control.

== Alliance ==
The school maintains an ongoing alliance with the Opoku Ware Senior High School, popularly called AkataSlopsa.

== Notable alumni ==
- Elizabeth Adjei, diplomat
- Margaret Amoakohene, academic and diplomat
- Anne Amuzu, computer scientist and entrepreneur
- Patricia Appiagyei, politician
- Abena Dugan, youth and gender advocate
- Lydia Forson, actress, writer and producer
- Dzifa Gomashie, actress, producer, screen scriptwriter and politician
- Ruth Ama Gyan-Darkwa, academic prodigy
- Yvonne Nduom, business executive
- Afia Schwarzenegger, Ghanaian media personality

== School Facilities ==
Below are some of the facilities provided for the school

- Assembly Hall
- Dinning Hall
- Art Studio
- Science Lab
- Administration Block

== See also ==
- Education in Ghana
- List of senior high schools in the Ashanti Region
- Roman Catholicism in Ghana
