= Amuzu =

Amuzu is a Ghanaian surname. Notable people with the surname include:

- Anne Amuzu, Ghanaian computer scientist
- Cynthia Amuzu (born 1965), Ghanaian badminton player
- Francis Amuzu (born 1999), Ghana-born Belgian footballer
