= CSIR =

CSIR may refer to:

== Organizations ==
- Council for Scientific and Industrial Research, an earlier name for the Commonwealth Scientific and Industrial Research Organisation, Australia, from 1926 to 1949
- Council for Scientific and Industrial Research – Ghana
- Council for Scientific and Industrial Research, South Africa
- Council of Scientific and Industrial Research, India
- Italian Expeditionary Corps in Russia, or Corpo di Spedizione Italiano in Russia

== Other uses ==
- Channel state information, in wireless communications
- Cross-sectional interventional radiology, in medecine
