= Sara Nana Yeboah =

Ghanaian nurse and philanthropist

- Medical career
- Profession: Nurse
- Institutions: Ridge Hospital

Sara Nana Yeboah popularly referred to as the "Florence Nightingale of Africa", is a Ghanaian nurse, philanthropist and social entrepreneur. In 2017, she was awarded Ghana's Most Outstanding Associate Clinician (Ward) at the 2017 HELEH Africa People's Choice Practitioners Honours held in Kumasi.

== Career ==
Yeboah is a professional nurse. As of 2014, she was a senior nurse officer at Ridge Hospital in Accra. She is currently the chief executive officer of Sangy Nursing Services, a private nursing firm.

== Philanthropy ==
Yeboah co-founded and is the vice President of The Sangy Foundation, a non-governmental organisation which raises the hopes of young people and works towards creating opportunities for them. Through her foundation, Yeboah has renovated schools, ran health campaigns and screenings, painted dilapidated hospital buildings and libraries and registered children onto the National Insurance Scheme across the country. Some of the schools her organisation has helped renovate include Nwasua M/A Primary and Junior high schools in the Brong-Ahafo Region and Kotei RC Primary School in Kumasi.

== Awards ==
She has won several awards for her work.
