= Counsellor Lutterodt =

Ghanaian relationship adviser

Cyril George Carstensen Lutterodt
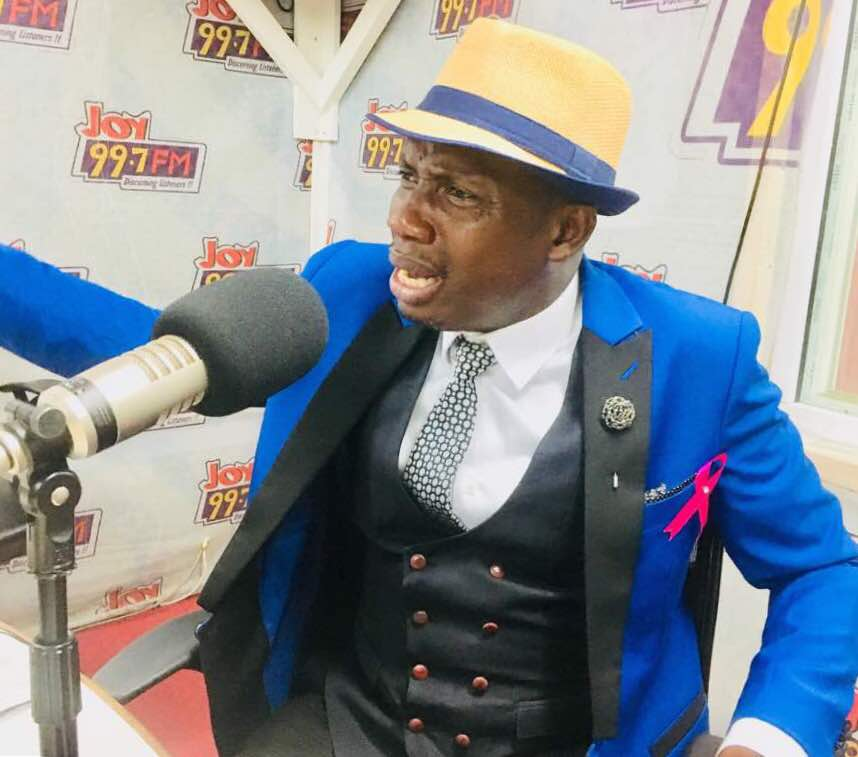
- Lutterodt in Joy FM studio 2017
- Born: Cyril George Carstensen Lutterodt; Ghana
- Occupation: Marriage guidance counselor
- Years active: 2009–present

Cyril George Carstensen Lutterodt, popularly known as Counselor Lutterodt, is a controversial Ghanaian marriage counselor who has spoken about various issues in the country and has received backlash for some of his comments.

== Early life and education ==
Counselor Lutterodt is a Ga man from Osu, who began his educational journey at the University of Ghana Staff Village School in Legon, then went on to the City of Ghana Academy. He received his tertiary education from Accra Polytechnic where he studied Electrical Engineering and later attended Southern Medical University in China and received training as a Biomedical Clinical Technician.

== Personal life ==
He married Grace Love, they had two children and divorced in 2016. He is now married to Abigail Naa Yemoley.

== Work and controversy ==
Lutterodt is a radio and TV relationship counselor and a Reverend Minister. He is known for his controversial thoughts and as a straightforward relationship communicator. In 2017, he controversially cited the Ashanti people as the people who masturbate the most among the ethnic groups in Ghana. He also stated that "Ashantis are the laziest people in bed" and added that they are most likely to engage in sexual activities if they are financially rewarded. In an interview with Yen.com.gh he raised divine curse on journalists in Ghana who misquote his comments. In 2018, he was replied by another controversial public spat Afia Schwarzenegger on his comments made by the late Ebony Reigns dressing before she died.

Lutterodt has been criticized on his comments about marriage and relationship. However, he describes those critiques as coming across because of poor media reportage. Some of his quotes which have received many criticisms include "When a National Service Person proposes to marry a woman, that lady should report him to the nearest police station.", "Dating is not a relationship", "If you are a woman and you date one man for more than two weeks then there is something wrong with you", "Never allow a poor man to marry you. A poor man's marriage will kill you early. And when you die you will go to hell"

In 2020, he claimed in an interview on Adom TVhttps://www.adomtv.net/ that rape victims enjoy the act and through the experience, some of them continue to have relationships with them. He was condemned by a number of persons in Ghana after making that statement. A petition was also sent to the Ministry of Communications and NCA to ban Lutterodt from empanelled on all radio and television stations.
