= Michael Kwasi Aidoo =

Ghanaian politician

Hon. Michael Kwasi Aidoo MP

Member of the Ghana Parliament for Oforikrom
- Incumbent
- Assumed office 7 January 2025
- Preceded by: Emmanuel Marfo
- President: John Dramani Mahama
- Vice President: Jane Naana Opoku-Agyemang

Personal details
- Born: 8 September 1985 (age 40) Wassa Akropong, Western Region, Ghana
- Party: New Patriotic Party
- Education: Prempeh College; Kwame Nkrumah University of Science and Technology; Coventry University; Harvard Business School Online
- Occupation: Politician
- Profession: Pricing and Risk Manager

Michael Kwasi Aidoo (born September 8, 1985) is a Ghanaian business strategist and politician serving as the Member of Parliament for the Oforikrom constituency in the Ashanti Region. He represents the New Patriotic Party (NPP) and is part of the Ninth Parliament of the Fourth Republic of Ghana

== Early life and education ==
Michael Aidoo was born on 8 September 1985, in Wassa Akropong, Western Region, Ghana. He attended Prempeh College, where he obtained his Senior Secondary School Certificate Examination (SSCE) in 2003. He then pursued a Bachelor of Fine Arts at the Kwame Nkrumah University of Science and Technology (KNUST), graduating in 2008. Continuing his education, Aidoo earned a Master of Business Administration (MBA) in Strategic Management and Consultancy from KNUST in 2015. He also obtained a Master of Science degree from Coventry University in September 2022. Additionally, he has completed certificate programs from Harvard Business School Online in March 2020, the International Human Resources Development Corporation in September 2020, and British Petroleum in November 2019.

== Career ==
Before entering politics, Aidoo worked as Pricing and Risk Manager at the Bulk Oil Storage and Transportation Company Limited (BOST). His previous roles include Business Development and Human Resource Manager at One Plus One Furniture City Ltd, Graphic Design and Advertising Agent at Western Publications Ltd, and Manager at Hanjoe Enterprise in Kumasi. In 2010, Aidoo ventured into entrepreneurship by starting his own printing and advertising business. He later expanded into the importation and retail of building materials.

=== Politics ===
Aidoo won the 2024 NPP parliamentary primary for Oforikrom, gaining 666 valid votes In the December 2024 general election, he was elected MP for Oforikrom, succeeding Emmanuel Marfo, with 47,709 votes (65.79% of valid votes). In Parliament, he serves as Deputy Ranking Member on the Youth and Sports Committee and as a member of both the Energy Committee and the Backbenchers’ Business Committee.

== Personal life ==
Michael Aidoo is a Christian.
