= KNUST Senior High School =

Public high school in Ghana

KNUST Senior High School (Technology Secondary School)
- MMADWEMMA
- Kumasi, Ghana; 6.690609°N .548136°W

Information
- Type: Public high school
- Motto: Forward be our watchword
- Established: 1961
- Head of school: Felicia Asamoah Danquah
- Staff: 66 teachers and 21 non-teaching staff
- Grades: Senior secondary years 1 - 3
- Enrollment: 1910
- Campus type: Suburban
- Color: Blue yellow
- Athletics: Hockey, basketball, football, handball, volleyball
- Information: 0542888803
- Website: http://techosa.org/

The KNUST Senior High School (the Kwame Nkrumah University of Science and Technology High School) is a co-educational institution in Kumasi, Ghana.

The school's nickname, in the Akan language, is Mmadwemma, meaning "people who carefully think before acting".

Its motto is "Forward be our watchword". Approximately 600 students graduate each year. Felicia Asamoah Danquah is the current headmistress of the school. It is a coeducational school, with an enrollment of about 900 boys and 1010 girls (2015). The school has a staff strength of 66 teachers and 21 non-teaching staff.

== Background and history ==
KNUST Senior High School was known as the Technology Secondary School until 2007. It offers high school education, and it is within the Kwame Nkrumah University of Science and Technology in Kumasi, Ghana. It was established in February 1961 by the then-vice chancellor of the University of Science and Technology, Dr. R.P. Baffour.

The school being, housed in prefabricated asbestos buildings, thus started as the "baby" of the university, that is, Kwame Nkrumah University of Science and Technology, in humble circumstances. From the onset, it was financed and staffed by the university. It was hoped that the school would eventually move into permanent buildings on the University campus, and become a boarding institution. From its foundation up to June 1967, the school retained the University Secondary Technical School. The Technical course was abandoned because of lack of staff and facilities. It has since been known and called Technology Secondary School.

The school was originally set up to give secondary school education to the children of the university staff. The school later opened up admission to the general public. KNUST Senior High School is a Class A Institution according to the West African Examination Council and the Ghana Education Service.

== Courses ==
The school offers the following courses:

- General arts
- Visual arts
- General science
- Business
- Engineering Science
- Home Science

== Notable alumni ==
- Amerado, musician
- Mohammed Muntaka, Minority Chief Whip of the Republic of Ghana
- Afia Schwarzenegger
- TwinsDntBeg, photographers
