= Isyana Syahira Meida =

Indonesian badminton player (born 2006)

Personal information
- Nickname: Hira
- Born: 6 December 2006 (age 19) Gresik, East Java, Indonesia

Sport
- Country: Indonesia
- Sport: Badminton
- Handedness: Right

Women's & mixed doubles
- Highest ranking: 31 (WD with Rinjani Kwinnara Nastine, 19 May 2026)
- Current ranking: 31 (WD with Rinjani Kwinnara Nastine, 10 November 2026)
- BWF profile
Medal record
Women's badminton
Representing Indonesia
World Junior Championships
Gold medal – first place	2024 Nanchang	Mixed team
Bronze medal – third place	2024 Nanchang	Girls' doubles
Asian Junior Championships
Bronze medal – third place	2024 Yogyakarta	Mixed team

Isyana Syahira Meida (born 6 December 2006) is an Indonesian badminton player affiliated with the Djarum club.

== Achievements ==
=== World Junior Championships ===
Girls' doubles
Year	Venue	Partner	Opponent	Score	Result	Ref.
2024	Nanchang International Sports Center; Nanchang, China	(Indonesia) Rinjani Kwinnara Nastine	(Japan) Ririna Hiramoto (Japan) Aya Tamaki	21–23, 19–21	Bronze	

=== BWF World Tour (3 titles, 1 runner-up) ===
The BWF World Tour, which was announced on 19 March 2017 and implemented in 2018, is a series of elite badminton tournaments sanctioned by the Badminton World Federation (BWF). The BWF World Tour is divided into levels of World Tour Finals, Super 1000, Super 750, Super 500, Super 300 (part of the HSBC World Tour), and the BWF Tour Super 100.

Women's doubles
Year	Tournament	Level	Partner	Opponent	Score	Result	Ref.
2025 (II)	Indonesia Masters	Super 100	(Indonesia) Rinjani Kwinnara Nastine	(Indonesia) Apriyani Rahayu (Indonesia) Siti Fadia Silva Ramadhanti	11–21, 17–21	(silver) Runner-up	
2025	Guwahati Masters	Super 100	(Indonesia) Rinjani Kwinnara Nastine	(Malaysia) Ong Xin Yee (Malaysia) Carmen Ting	21–17, 23–21	(gold) Winner	
2026 (II)	Indonesia Masters	Super 100	(Indonesia) Rinjani Kwinnara Nastine	(Thailand) Hathaithip Mijad (Thailand) Napapakorn Tungkasatan	21–15, 21–17	(gold) Winner	
2026	Kaohsiung Masters	Super 100	(Indonesia) Rinjani Kwinnara Nastine	(Malaysia) Ong Xin Yee (Malaysia) Carmen Ting	21–15, 21–15	(gold) Winner	

=== BWF International Challenge/Series (6 titles, 1 runner-up) ===
Women's doubles
Year	Tournament	Partner	Opponent	Score	Result	Ref.
2023	Malaysia International	(Indonesia) Rinjani Kwinnara Nastine	(Thailand) Supamart Mingchua (Thailand) Pattaraporn Rungruengpramong	23–21, 21–15	(gold) Winner	
2024 (I)	Vietnam International Series	(Indonesia) Rinjani Kwinnara Nastine	(Philippines) Airah Mae Nicole Albo (Philippines) Eleanor Inlayo	21–18, 21–14	(gold) Winner	
2025	Luxembourg Open	(Indonesia) Rinjani Kwinnara Nastine	(Denmark) Lærke Hvid (Denmark) Anna Klausholm	21–14, 21–6	(gold) Winner	
2025	Denmark Challenge	(Indonesia) Rinjani Kwinnara Nastine	(Japan) Mikoto Aiso (Japan) Momoha Niimi	15–21, 21–17, 26–28	(silver) Runner-up	
2025	Ghana International	(Indonesia) Rinjani Kwinnara Nastine	(Indonesia) Nabila Cahya Permata Ayu (Indonesia) Nahya Muhyifa	22–20, 21–18	(gold) Winner	
2025	Cameroon International	(Indonesia) Rinjani Kwinnara Nastine	(Indonesia) Nabila Cahya Permata Ayu (Indonesia) Nahya Muhyifa	21–15, 21–14	(gold) Winner	
2025	Lagos International	(Indonesia) Rinjani Kwinnara Nastine	(United Arab Emirates) Aleena Qathun (United Arab Emirates) Sreeyuktha Sreejith Parol	21–18, 21–7	(gold) Winner	

BWF International Challenge tournament
BWF International Series tournament
BWF Future Series tournament

=== BWF Junior International (1 title) ===
Girls' doubles
Year	Tournament	Partner	Opponent	Score	Result	Ref.
2023	Malaysia Junior International Challenge	(Indonesia) Rinjani Kwinnara Nastine	(Indonesia) Velisha Christina (Indonesia) Bernadine Wardana	21–19, 21–15	(gold) Winner	

BWF Junior International Grand Prix tournament
BWF Junior International Challenge tournament
BWF Junior International Series tournament
BWF Junior Future Series tournament

== Performance timeline ==
Key

W	Won	F	Finalist	SF	Semi-finalist
QF	Quarter-finalist	#R	Rounds 4, 3, 2, 1	RR	Round-robin stage
Q#	Qualification round	A	Absent	w/d	Withdrew
G	Gold	S	Silver	B	Bronze
NH	Not held	N/A	Not applicable	DNQ	Did not qualify

=== National team ===
- Junior level

Team events	2024	Ref
Asian Junior Championships	B	
World Junior Championships	G	

=== Individual competitions ===
==== Junior level ====
- Girls' doubles

Events	2023	2024	Ref
Asian Junior Championships	2R	QF	
World Junior Championships	A	B	

==== Senior level ====
- Women's doubles

Events	2026	Ref
World Championships	2R	

Tournament	BWF World Tour					Best	Ref
Tournament	2022	2023	2024	2025	2026	Best	Ref
Indonesia Masters	1R	A		Q2	1R	1R ('22, '26)	
Thailand Masters	NH	A			1R	1R ('26)	
Orléans Masters	A				w/d	—	
Thailand Open	A				QF	QF ('26)	
Malaysia Masters	A				1R	1R ('26)	
Indonesia Open	A			1R	1R	1R ('25, '26)	
Macau Open	NH		A		2R	2R ('26)	
Taipei Open	A				1R	1R ('26)	
Korea Masters	A			1R	A	1R ('25)	
Indonesia Masters Super 100	A	A	2R	QF	A	W ('26 II)	
Indonesia Masters Super 100	A	A		F	W	W ('26 II)	
Vietnam Open	A		QF	1R	A	QF ('24)	
Malaysia Super 100	N/A	A			QF	QF ('26)	
Korea Open	A				2R	2R ('26)	
Kaohsiung Masters	N/A	A			W	W ('26)	
Syed Modi International	A			QF	Q	QF ('25)	
Guwahati Masters	NH	A		W	A	W ('25)	
Odisha Masters	A			SF		SF ('25)	
Year-end ranking	235	240	112	33		31	
Tournament	2022	2023	2024	2025	2026	Best	Ref
