= Nigerian Building and Road Research Institute =

Nigerian Building and Road research Institute
- Abbreviation: NBRRI
- Formation: 1952
- Type: Governmental organisation
- Legal status: Research Institute
- Headquarters: Abuja
- Parent organization: Federal Ministry of Science and Technology, Nigeria
- Website: https://nbrri.gov.ng/new/

The Nigerian Building and Road Research Institute (NBRRI) is a Government of Nigeria institute responsible for researching and developing road and building materials for the Nigerian building industry. The institute is under the Federal Ministry of Innovation, Science and Technology of Nigeria.

== History ==
The institute replaced the West African Building Research Institute which was established in 1952 by building professionals from Ghana and Nigeria in Accra, Ghana. Membership of the institute was made up of building engineers from both countries. When Nigeria gained independence from Britain, the Nigerian members of the institute left the West African Building Research Institute to form the Nigerian Building and Road Research Institute in 1978. The Ghanaian members formed the Building Research Institute of the Ghana Academy of Arts and Sciences.

In 2024, Prof. Samson Duna was reappointed as the Director General of NBRRI since his initial appointment in 2020

== Locations ==
The headquarter of NBRRI is in Abuja, Nigeria. There are four zonal offices that facilitates the institutes activities:

1. Eastern Zonal Office in Anambra State
2. Western Zonal Office in Ikoyi, Lagos
3. Northern Zonal Office in Kano, Kano State
4. National Liboratory & Production Complex in Otta, Ogun State

== Nation building ==
The institute engages the Government of Nigeria on various policies that regulate and improve the quality of buildings in Nigeria. In May 2011 the Federal Government of Nigeria announced a Material Testing Laboratory to be set up, which would provide a facility for the testing of building material before use. The facility had become necessary due to the regular occurrence of collapsing buildings. The facility was to function as research and education centre for tertiary institutions and the construction industry.

== Collaborations ==
NBRRI has research collaboration with other state and foreign agencies. In 2009, the institutes and its Ghanaian counterpart signed a memorandum of understanding to research into building and road construction materials. In June 2011, the NBRRI announced it was partnering with the Federal Mortgage Bank of Nigeria for the construction of 1,000 housing units every federal state of Nigeria. The partnership required that all the buildings be constructed using alternative building materials that had been developed by the institute.

== Achievements ==
In March 2011, the institute announced that it had developed a new technology for the moulding of bricks known as cement stabilized bricks technology. The new technology was to reduce the cost of building due to a cheap alternative building material that the technology used in the production of bricks.

== See also ==
- Building and Road Research Institute
