= Abena Dugan =

Ghanaian activist

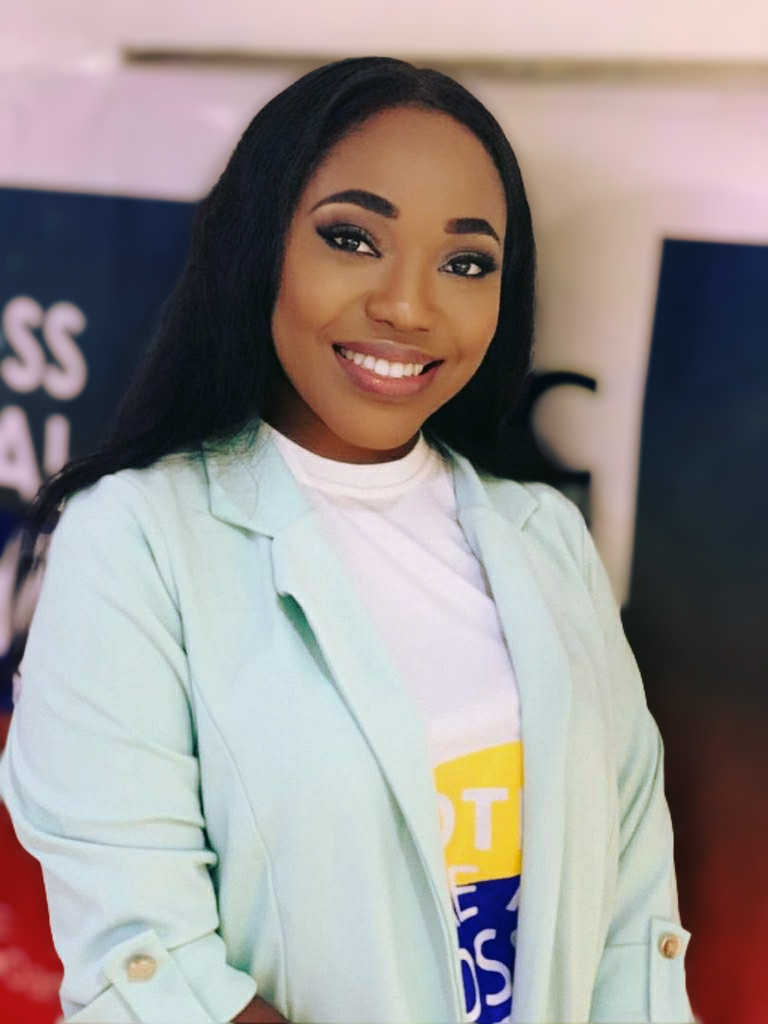
- Citizenship: Ghana
- Education: Kwame Nkrumah University of Science and Technology; University of Ghana
- Occupation: Activist
- Years active: 2018–present
- Known for: Commonwealth Youth Council

Abena Dugan is a Ghanaian youth and gender advocate. In 2018, she was elected vice chair in charge of Partnership and Resources of the Commonwealth Youth Council, making her the first female and Ghanaian hold the position. The Commonwealth Youth council is the largest and most diverse youth-led organisation in the world, as such Dugan is now representing young people in 53 Commonwealth countries.

== Education ==
She is a former student of St. Louis Secondary School and Student Representative Council Secretary of the Kwame Nkrumah University of Science and Technology in Kumasi. She also has a master's degree in Development Finance from the University of Ghana, Legon. She also has a certificate from Oxford Executive Leadership Programme 2020 and currently studying at the School of Law, University of Leeds UK.

== Career ==
As part of the Commonwealth Heads of Government Meeting 2018, she contested and won an election leading to her appointment as vice chair of the partnership and resources. Before her appointment, she served as the financial coordinator for the Commonwealth Alliance for young entrepreneurs West Africa Chapter. She is also a founding member of Climate Resilient Network and a member of the World Students Environmental Network.
