= Boadi =

- Town
- Interactive map of Boadi
- Country: Ghana

Government
  - Abusuapayin: Kwame Konadu Yiadom

Area
  - Total: 657.1 km^{2} (253.7 sq mi)

Population (2015)
  - Total: 28,860
  - Density: 43.9/km^{2} (114/sq mi)
- Time zone: UTC+0

Boadi is a town in Ghana located 15 kilometres from the centre of Kumasi. It is a dormitory town, serving mainly as a residential area for workers in various companies in Kumasi.

== Boundaries ==
The town is bordered to the north by Ayeduase, to the west by Emina, to the east by Kentinkrono and to the south by Anwomaso.

== History and land ownership ==
Boadi, a town located in the Oforikrom Municipality of the Ashanti Region, is traditionally associated with the Huahi Achama Tutuwaa Royal Family. Oral tradition and local accounts trace the origins of the settlement to Queen Huahi Achama Tutuwaa, a consort of Asantehene Osei Tutu I, the founder of the Ashanti Empire. According to local legend, land in the Benimasi-Boadi area was granted to her and her descendants as part of a royal matrimonial alliance. The lineage and associated customs have been maintained by the royal family and local custodians over generations.

In modern times, disputes over land ownership have led to legal proceedings concerning large portions of land in the Boadi-Benimasi area. The Huahi Royal Family has claimed allodial title to approximately 1,298 acres of land, based on customary law and documented inheritance. In response to ongoing disputes, family representatives have referenced Ghana's Land Act 2020 (Act 1036), which protects customary landholders and recognizes allodial titles under Ghanaian law.

The family's legal efforts have included engagements with Ghanaian courts and international advocacy platforms, such as GlobalGiving and Land Rights Defenders, to assert their rights and prevent encroachment on family lands. A land survey conducted in 2019 and a legal ruling from 2020 have both been cited as part of the family's documentation of their claim.
