= 2024 BWF World Junior Championships – Girls' doubles =

Tournament details
- Dates: 7 October 2024 – 13 October 2024
- Edition: 24th
- Level: International
- Venue: Nanchang International Sports Center
- Location: Nanchang, China

The girls' doubles of the tournament 2024 BWF World Junior Championships was an individual badminton tournament to crown the best girls' doubles under-19 player across the BWF associate members around the world. Players compete to win the Eye Level Cup presented by the former BWF President and chairman of the World Youth Culture Foundation, Kang Young Joong. The tournament was held from 7 to 13 October 2024 in Nanchang International Sports Center, Nanchang, Jiangxi, China. The winner of the last edition was Maya Taguchi and Aya Tamaki from Japan.

== Seeds ==
Click on the seed number of a player to go to their draw section.

1. (China) Chen Fanshutian / Liu Jiayue (semi-finals)
2. (Indonesia) Isyana Syahira Meida / Rinjani Kwinara Nastine (semi-finals)
3. (France) Elsa Jacob / Camille Pognante (fourth round)
4. (Japan) Ririna Hiramoto / Aya Tamaki (champions)
5. (Thailand) Yataweemin Ketklieng / Passa-Orn Phannachet (third round)
6. (Malaysia) Ong Xin Yee / Carmen Ting (quarter-finals)
7. (United Arab Emirates) Taabia Khan / Mysha Omer Khan (second round)
8. (France) Agathe Cuevas / Kathell Desmots-Chacun (fourth round)

9. (Thailand) Phattharin Aiamvareesrisakul / Napapakorn Tungkasatan (third round)
10. (Thailand) Kodchaporn Chaichana / Pannawee Polyiam (third round)
11. (Indonesia) Ardita Anjani / Titis Maulida Rahma (fourth round)
12. (Czech Republic) Kateřina Koliášová / Kateřina Osladilová (third round)
13. (Switzerland) Jorina Jann / Leila Zarrouk (third round)
14. (Slovenia) Anja Blazina / Ariana Korent (second round)
15. (Chinese Taipei) Chen Yan-fei / Sun Liang-ching (fourth round)
16. (Denmark) Amanda Aarrebo Petersen / Maria Højlund Tommerup (fourth round)

== Draw ==
=== Finals ===
Quarter-finals
1	(China) Chen Fanshutian (China) Liu Jiayue	21	21
(China) Jiang Peixi (China) Zhang Jiahan	16	13
(Malaysia) Low Zi Yu (Malaysia) Dania Sofea	21	21
6	(Malaysia) Ong Xin Yee (Malaysia) Carmen Ting	11	16
(Japan) Sora Hatakeyama (Japan) Akari Kamio	12	8
4	(Japan) Ririna Hiramoto (Japan) Aya Tamaki	21	21
(China) Liu Yuanyuan (China) Wang Dao	18	19
2	(Indonesia) Isyana Syahira Meida (Indonesia) Rinjani Kwinara Nastine	21	21

Semi-finals
1	(China) Chen Fanshutian (China) Liu Jiayue	21	16	17
(Malaysia) Low Zi Yu (Malaysia) Dania Sofea	16	21	21
4	(Japan) Ririna Hiramoto (Japan) Aya Tamaki	23	21
2	(Indonesia) Isyana Syahira Meida (Indonesia) Rinjani Kwinara Nastine	21	19

Final
(Malaysia) Low Zi Yu (Malaysia) Dania Sofea	17	17
4	(Japan) Ririna Hiramoto (Japan) Aya Tamaki	21	21

=== Top half ===
==== Section 1 ====
First round
(Slovakia) K Goldiánová (Slovakia) J Ivanovičová	21	21
(Peru) R Castañeda (Peru) T Kasianov	10	18

Second round
1	(China) Chen FST (China) Liu JY	21	21
(Japan) M Aiso (Japan) R Ueno	16	12
(Estonia) H Merisalu (Estonia) E Shapovalova	21	21
(Northern Mariana Islands) G Lansangan (Northern Mariana Islands) A Maratas	7	9
11	(Indonesia) A Anjani (Indonesia) T M Rahma	21	21
(Poland) A Syrek (Poland) K Ziółkowska	14	8
(New Zealand) YX Liu (New Zealand) J Zhao	21	21
(Slovakia) K Goldiánová (Slovakia) J Ivanovičová	12	15

Third round
1	(China) Chen FST (China) Liu JY	21	21
(Estonia) H Merisalu (Estonia) E Shapovalova	4	11
11	(Indonesia) A Anjani (Indonesia) T M Rahma	21	21
(New Zealand) YX Liu (New Zealand) J Zhao	13	11

Fourth round
1	(China) Chen FST (China) Liu JY	21	21
11	(Indonesia) A Anjani (Indonesia) T M Rahma	14	14

==== Section 2 ====
First round
(Portugal) E Glória (Portugal) M Wilkinson	21	21
(Macau) Chan H W (Macau) Ung C I	13	16
(United States) A Chang (United States) E Lin	21	21
(Cook Islands) T Nicholas-Herman (Cook Islands) L Toa	1	3

Second round
7	(United Arab Emirates) M O Khan (United Arab Emirates) T Khan	17	12
(China) Jiang PX (China) Zhang JH	21	21
(Ghana) M Adu (Ghana) R Quarcoo
(Portugal) E Glória (Portugal) M Wilkinson	w	/	o
16	(Denmark) A A Petersen (Denmark) M H Tommerup	21	21
(England) L Brierley (England) L Dundas	10	10
(Singapore) Heng X E (Singapore) M Zan	9	21	9
(United States) A Chang (United States) E Lin	21	19	21

Third round
(China) Jiang PX (China) Zhang JH	21	21
(Portugal) E Glória (Portugal) M Wilkinson	6	10
16	(Denmark) A A Petersen (Denmark) M H Tommerup	21	24
(United States) A Chang (United States) E Lin	19	22

Fourth round
(China) Jiang PX (China) Zhang JH	21	7	21
16	(Denmark) A A Petersen (Denmark) M H Tommerup	17	21	16

==== Section 3 ====
First round
(Canada) K Lau (Canada) E Xia	21	21
(Philippines) A P Hernandez (Philippines) P D Libaton	17	18
(Turkey) A Korkut (Turkey) S Yıldız	21	21
(Netherlands) M Duijndam (Netherlands) F Wang	12	8

Second round
3	(France) E Jacob (France) C Pognante	21	21
(Armenia) E Hovhannisyan (Armenia) L Smbatyan	6	3
(India) S Narayanan (India) R Uthayasooriyan	21	21
(Canada) K Lau (Canada) E Xia	12	13
9	(Thailand) P Aiamvareesrisakul (Thailand) N Tungkasatan	21	21
(Mauritius) C How Hong (Mauritius) E How Hong	4	5
(Malaysia) Low Z Y (Malaysia) D Sofea	21	21
(Turkey) A Korkut (Turkey) S Yıldız	12	8

Third round
3	(France) E Jacob (France) C Pognante	21	15	21
(India) S Narayanan (India) R Uthayasooriyan	17	21	18
9	(Thailand) P Aiamvareesrisakul (Thailand) N Tungkasatan	17	22
(Malaysia) Low Z Y (Malaysia) D Sofea	21	24

Fourth round
3	(France) E Jacob (France) C Pognante	15	17
(Malaysia) Low Z Y (Malaysia) D Sofea	21	21

==== Section 4 ====
First round
(Australia) S Tjonadi (Australia) V Tjonadi	9	11
(Chinese Taipei) Chou Y-a (Chinese Taipei) Huang K-x	21	21
(Vietnam) Bùi B P (Vietnam) Trần T Á	21	21
(Mongolia) A Bayasgalan (Mongolia) B Sarangoo	3	11

Second round
6	(Malaysia) Ong X Y (Malaysia) C Ting	21	21
(Hong Kong) Chu W C (Hong Kong) Liu H K	11	15
(Sri Lanka) V Jayawardana (Sri Lanka) R Mudalige	7	15
(Chinese Taipei) Chou Y-a (Chinese Taipei) Huang K-x	21	21
14	(Slovenia) A Blazina (Slovenia) A Korent	14	13
(Indonesia) R Anggraini (Indonesia) S Z Aulia	21	21
(Latvia) M Mackēviča (Latvia) A Priedniece	6	11
(Vietnam) Bùi B P (Vietnam) Trần T Á	21	21

Third round
6	(Malaysia) Ong X Y (Malaysia) C Ting	21	21
(Chinese Taipei) Chou Y-a (Chinese Taipei) Huang K-x	17	9
(Indonesia) R Anggraini (Indonesia) S Z Aulia	21	24
(Vietnam) Bùi B P (Vietnam) Trần T Á	19	22

Fourth round
6	(Malaysia) Ong X Y (Malaysia) C Ting	21	21
(Indonesia) R Anggraini (Indonesia) S Z Aulia	15	9

=== Bottom half ===
==== Section 5 ====
First round
(United Arab Emirates) T Karthikeyan (United Arab Emirates) S Kurbkhelgi	14	20
(Peru) E Canchanya (Peru) V Chuquimaqui	21	22
(Northern Mariana Islands) S Malonzo (Northern Mariana Islands) L Tsukagoshi	12	16
(Netherlands) S Bang (Netherlands) I Pothuizen	21	21

Second round
(Peru) E Canchanya (Peru) V Chuquimaqui	7	5
(Japan) S Hatakeyama (Japan) A Kamio	21	21
(Poland) M Janko (Poland) K Stokfisz	21	18	15
12	(Czech Republic) K Koliášová (Czech Republic) K Osladilová	19	21	21
(Netherlands) S Bang (Netherlands) I Pothuizen	18	15
(Malaysia) N Chau (Malaysia) N Maisarah	21	21
(Portugal) M Avelino (Portugal) I Wilkinson	14	3
8	(France) A Cuevas (France) K Desmots-Chacun	21	21

Third round
(Japan) S Hatakeyama (Japan) A Kamio	21	21
12	(Czech Republic) K Koliášová (Czech Republic) K Osladilová	18	18
(Malaysia) N Chau (Malaysia) N Maisarah	22	17	20
8	(France) A Cuevas (France) K Desmots-Chacun	20	21	22

Fourth round
(Japan) S Hatakeyama (Japan) A Kamio	10	21	21
8	(France) A Cuevas (France) K Desmots-Chacun	21	15	14

==== Section 6 ====
First round
(Norway) L Holmedal (Norway) M Korssund	9	15
(Philippines) A P Hernandez (Philippines) M D Untal	21	21
(Azerbaijan) L Jamalzade (Azerbaijan) H Nuriyeva	9	7
(Singapore) Li Z Y (Singapore) A Tay	21	21

Second round
(Philippines) A P Hernandez (Philippines) M D Untal	21	21
(Latvia) E Freija (Latvia) N Muķiele	7	7
(Mongolia) T-O Enkhlen (Mongolia) D Nandin-Erdene	5	4
13	(Switzerland) J Jann (Switzerland) L Zarrouk	21	21
(Singapore) Li Z Y (Singapore) A Tay	w	/	o
(Uganda) R Bukenya (Uganda) O B Kyomukama
(Australia) J Lam (Australia) B Li	5	8
4	(Japan) R Hiramoto (Japan) A Tamaki	21	21

Third round
(Philippines) A P Hernandez (Philippines) M D Untal	16	21	21
13	(Switzerland) J Jann (Switzerland) L Zarrouk	21	8	10
(Singapore) Li Z Y (Singapore) A Tay	6	16
4	(Japan) R Hiramoto (Japan) A Tamaki	21	21

Fourth round
(Philippines) A P Hernandez (Philippines) M D Untal	13	10
4	(Japan) R Hiramoto (Japan) A Tamaki	21	21

==== Section 7 ====
First round
(England) M Franklin (England) R Parab	14	13
(India) T Suri (India) S Walekar	21	21
(Denmark) A-S Nielsen (Denmark) J Willis	21	21
(Estonia) L Liias (Estonia) M Paskotši	15	14

Second round
(India) T Suri (India) S Walekar	21	21
(New Zealand) M Xu (New Zealand) QX Yang	10	2
(Sri Lanka) D Ambalangodage (Sri Lanka) S Hewagallage	13	9
15	(Chinese Taipei) Chen Y-f (Chinese Taipei) Sun L-c	21	21
(Denmark) A-S Nielsen (Denmark) J Willis	7	8
(China) Liu YY (China) Wang D	21	21
(Slovenia) T Alič (Slovenia) T Horvat	6	1
5	(Thailand) Y Ketklieng (Thailand) P-O Phannachet	21	21

Third round
(India) T Suri (India) S Walekar	10	16
15	(Chinese Taipei) Chen Y-f (Chinese Taipei) Sun L-c	21	21
(China) Liu YY (China) Wang D	21	19	21
5	(Thailand) Y Ketklieng (Thailand) P-O Phannachet	11	21	10

Fourth round
15	(Chinese Taipei) Chen Y-f (Chinese Taipei) Sun L-c	20	21	20
(China) Liu YY (China) Wang D	22	10	22

==== Section 8 ====
First round
(Canada) M Tian (Canada) K S Wang	21	15	15
(Vietnam) Nguyễn T T H (Vietnam) Nguyễn V N T	19	21	21
(Turkey) S Acu (Turkey) B Aşkar	6	15
(Chinese Taipei) Jheng Y-c (Chinese Taipei) Wang Y-y	21	21

Second round
(Vietnam) Nguyễn T T H (Vietnam) Nguyễn V N T	12	11
(United States) C Ho (United States) V Yang	21	21
(Hong Kong) Chan W L (Hong Kong) Ip S W	12	18
10	(Thailand) K Chaichana (Thailand) P Polyiam	21	21
(Chinese Taipei) Jheng Y-c (Chinese Taipei) Wang Y-y	21	21
(Macau) Wang W K (Macau) Wong L I	5	5
(Cook Islands) T Akavi (Cook Islands) T P Tupa	3	3
2	(Indonesia) I S Meida (Indonesia) R K Nastine	21	21

Third round
(United States) C Ho (United States) V Yang	21	15	21
10	(Thailand) K Chaichana (Thailand) P Polyiam	19	21	15
(Chinese Taipei) Jheng Y-c (Chinese Taipei) Wang Y-y	14	15
2	(Indonesia) I S Meida (Indonesia) R K Nastine	21	21

Fourth round
(United States) C Ho (United States) V Yang	9	11
2	(Indonesia) I S Meida (Indonesia) R K Nastine	21	21
