= Ghana International =

The Ghana International is an international badminton tournament, which was planned to be hosted by Badminton Association of Ghana after a long break for the first time in 2017 since 1989. The tournament had been scheduled to be held from 20 to 23 July 2017 and was graded as International Series, a Level 4 badminton tournament. However, the tournament was cancelled.

== Previous winners ==
Year	Men's singles	Women's singles	Men's doubles	Women's doubles	Mixed doubles	Ref
1989	(Ghana) Charles Mensah	(Ghana) Nelly Akainyah	(Ghana) Ernest Kyei (Ghana) Boniface Amuzu	(Ghana) Nelly Akainyah (Ghana) Cynthia Amuzu	(Ghana) Owusu Agyemang (Ghana) Cynthia Amuzu	
1990– 2016	Not held					
2017	Cancelled					
2018	(India) Harsheel Dani	(Israel) Ksenia Polikarpova	(India) V K Hanumaiah Raganatha (India) Ashith Surya	(India) Harika Veludurthi (India) Karishma Wadkar	(India) Vighnesh Devlekar (India) Harika Veludurthi	
2019	(India) Kiran George	(Vietnam) Vũ Thị Trang	(India) Arjun M. R. (India) Ramchandran Shlok	(India) K. Maneesha (India) Rutaparna Panda	(India) Ramchandran Shlok (India) Rutaparna Panda	
2020– 2024	Not held					
2025	(Indonesia) Prahdiska Bagas Shujiwo	(Indonesia) Thalita Ramadhani Wiryawan	(Indonesia) Anselmus Prasetya (Indonesia) Pulung Ramadhan	(Indonesia) Isyana Syahira Meida (Indonesia) Rinjani Kwinnara Nastine	(Indonesia) Bimo Prasetyo (Indonesia) Thesya Munggaran	
2026	(United Arab Emirates) Riyan Malhan	(United Arab Emirates) Nurani Ratu Azzahra	(India) Abhyuday Choudhary (India) Ayush Makhija	(Ghana) Moslena Adu (Ghana) Rachael Quarcoo	(United Arab Emirates) Shashaank Sai Munnangi (Australia) Supriya Yellapragada	

== Performances by countries ==
As of 2026 edition

Rank	Nation	MS	WS	MD	WD	XD	Total
1	India	2		3	2	2	9
2	Ghana*	1	1	1	2	1	6
3	Indonesia	1	1	1	1	1	5
4	United Arab Emirates	1	1			0.5	2.5
5	Israel		1				1
5	Vietnam		1				1
7	Australia					0.5	0.5
Total		5	5	5	5	5	25

* Host nation
