= Forestry Research Institute of Ghana =

One of 13 research institutes under CSIR-Ghana

The Forestry Research Institute of Ghana (FORIG) is a research institution under the Council for Scientific and Industrial Research of Ghana.

The Forestry Research Institute of Ghana (FORIG), located in Fumesua near Kumasi in the Ashanti Region, is one of 13 institutes under the Council for Scientific and Industrial Research (CSIR). It began as a forestry research unit in 1962, became the Forest Products Research Institute in 1964, and was integrated into CSIR in 1968.

In 1980, Act 405 of Parliament transferred the institute from CSIR to the Forestry Commission. Its name was changed to the Forestry Research Institute of Ghana in 1991 to reflect its broader research focus. However, in 1993, Act 453 returned the institute to the CSIR.
