= Elizabeth Adjei =

Ghanaian diplomat

Elizabeth Ajei
- Education: Kwame Nkrumah University of Science and Technology
- Occupation: Diplomat
- Employer: Ghana Immigration Service

Elizabeth Adjei is a Ghanaian diplomat. In September 2002, she was appointed as director of the Ghana Immigration Service, making her the first woman to occupy such a position. She has served as Ghana's Ambassador to Spain, a position she held from 2015 to 2020.

== Early life and education ==
Adjei was born in Ghana. For her secondary education, she attended the Archbishop Porter Girls' Secondary School in Takoradi and the St. Louis Senior High School in Kumasi. She then proceeded to the Kwame Nkrumah University of Science and Technology (KNUST) where she obtained a Bachelor of Arts Degree. She holds a Master's Degree in International Development from the Cornell University in New York, as well as certificates in Management and Personnel Management from the Ghana Institute of Management and Public Administration and a Diploma in French from the University of Benin.

== Career ==
After completing university, Adjei did her national service at the Ghana Immigration Service where she worked as personal assistant to the then head of the institution. She later joined the service in 1988 and worked as administrative assistant. In 2002, she became the first woman to be appointed as director of the Ghana Immigration Service, a position she held until 2011.

She was appointed as Ghana's Ambassador to Spain in 2015 by President John Dramani Mahama, a position she held till 2020 when her tenure ended. After the New Patriotic Party came into power, her mandate as ambassador was renewed by President Nana Addo Dankwa Akufo-Addo for 3 years.

== Personal life ==
Adjei is married with three children.
