= 2024 Badminton Asia Junior Championships – Girls' doubles =

Tournament details
- Dates: 3 – 7 July 2024
- Edition: 24th
- Level: International
- Venue: Among Rogo Sports Hall
- Location: Yogyakarta, Indonesia

The girls' doubles tournament of the 2024 Badminton Asia Junior Championships was held from 3 to 7 July. Mei Sudo and Nao Yamakita from Japan clinched this title in the last edition in 2023.

== Seeds ==
Seeds were announced on 4 June. Click on the seed number of a player to go to their draw section.

1. (Thailand) Naphachanok Utsanon / Sabrina Sophita Wedler (third round)
2. (Japan) Ririna Hiramoto / Aya Tamaki (semi-finals)
3. (Indonesia) Isyana Syahira Meida / Rinjani Kwinara Nastine (quarter-finals)
4. (United Arab Emirates) Taabia Khan / Mysha Omer Khan (second round)
5. (China) Chen Fanshutian / Liu Jiayue (champion)
6. (Thailand) Yataweemin Ketklieng / Passa-Orn Phannachet (third round)
7. (Malaysia) Carmen Ting / Ong Xin Yee (semi-finals)
8. (South Korea) Kim Min-ji / Yeon Seo-yeon (final)

== Draw ==
=== Finals ===
Semi-finals
5 | (China) Chen Fanshutian (China) Liu Jiayue | 17 | 21 | 23
7 | (Malaysia) Ong Xin Yee (Malaysia) Carmen Ting | 21 | 15 | 21
8 | (South Korea) Kim Min-ji (South Korea) Yeon Seo-yeon | 15 | 21 | 21
2 | (Japan) Ririna Hiramoto (Japan) Aya Tamaki | 21 | 17 | 18

Final
5 | (China) Chen Fanshutian (China) Liu Jiayue | 21 | 21
8 | (South Korea) Kim Min-ji (South Korea) Yeon Seo-yeon | 11 | 15

=== Top half ===
==== Section 1 ====
First round
(Japan) M Aiso (Japan) N Matsuta | 21 | 21
(Philippines) A P Hernandez (Philippines) P D Libaton | 17 | 12
(Hong Kong) Chan W L (Hong Kong) Wong Y | 19 | 11
(Chinese Taipei) Chen Y-f (Chinese Taipei) Sun L-c | 21 | 21
(Indonesia) A Anjani (Indonesia) T M Rahma | 21 | 21
(Malaysia) C San (Malaysia) Tan Z H | 13 | 11

Second round
1 | (Thailand) N Utsanon (Thailand) S S Wedler | 17 | 21 | 21
(India) G Rawat (India) M Rawat | 21 | 7 | 10
(Vietnam) Lương N K N (Vietnam) Mai T T N | 6 | 8
(Japan) M Aiso (Japan) N Matsuta | 21 | 21
5 | (China) Chen FST (China) Liu JY | 17 | 21 | 22
(Chinese Taipei) Chen Y-f (Chinese Taipei) Sun L-c | 21 | 12 | 20
(United Arab Emirates) T Karthikeyan (United Arab Emirates) S Kurbkhelgi | 19 | 8
(Indonesia) A Anjani (Indonesia) T M Rahma | 21 | 21

Third round
1 | (Thailand) N Utsanon (Thailand) S S Wedler | 19 | 17^{r}
(Japan) M Aiso (Japan) N Matsuta | 21 | 17
5 | (China) Chen FST (China) Liu JY | 21 | 21
(Indonesia) A Anjani (Indonesia) T M Rahma | 14 | 13

Quarter-finals
(Japan) M Aiso (Japan) N Matsuta | 13 | 21
5 | (China) Chen FST (China) Liu JY | 21 | 23

==== Section 2 ====
First round
(South Korea) Cheon H-i (South Korea) Kim T-y | 21 | 21
(China) Liao LX (China) Sun XL | 12 | 16
(Philippines) K M De Leon (Philippines) B E Fuggan | 19 | 11
(Singapore) Heng X E (Singapore) M Zan | 21 | 21
(Thailand) K Chaichana (Thailand) P Polyiam | 18 | 8
(Indonesia) N C P Ayu (Indonesia) R O Damayani | 21 | 21
(Macau) Wang W K (Macau) Wong L I | 8 | 9
(Chinese Taipei) Chou Y-a (Chinese Taipei) Huang K-x | 21 | 21

Second round
3 | (Indonesia) I S Meida (Indonesia) R K Nastine | 21 | 22
(South Korea) Cheon H-i (South Korea) Kim T-y | 12 | 20
(Hong Kong) Ip S Y (Hong Kong) A Liu H K | 21 | 16 | 9
(Singapore) Heng X E (Singapore) M Zan | 15 | 21 | 21
7 | (Malaysia) Ong X Y (Malaysia) C Ting | 21 | 21
(Indonesia) N C P Ayu (Indonesia) R O Damayani | 17 | 9
(Japan) R Ueno (Japan) M Yokouchi | 21 | 22
(Chinese Taipei) Chou Y-a (Chinese Taipei) Huang K-x | 8 | 9

Third round
3 | (Indonesia) I S Meida (Indonesia) R K Nastine | 21 | 21
(Singapore) Heng X E (Singapore) M Zan | 13 | 10
7 | (Malaysia) Ong X Y (Malaysia) C Ting | 21 | 21
(Japan) R Ueno (Japan) M Yokouchi | 8 | 15

Quarter-finals
3 | (Indonesia) I S Meida (Indonesia) R K Nastine | 21 | 21 | 15
7 | (Malaysia) Ong X Y (Malaysia) C Ting | 23 | 16 | 21

=== Bottom half ===
==== Section 3 ====
First round
(Chinese Taipei) Jheng Y-c (Chinese Taipei) Wang Y-y | 21 | 22 | 21
(Indonesia) A F Z Debita (Indonesia) J N Situmorang | 15 | 24 | 17
(Thailand) H Mijad (Thailand) H Momin | 16 | 21 | 13
(China) Liu YY (China) Wang D | 21 | 19 | 21
(Japan) Y Azumaya (Japan) H Hashimura | 10 | 23 | 21
(Singapore) Li ZH (Singapore) Li ZY | 21 | 21 | 13
(Macau) Chan H W (Macau) Ung C I | 15 | 9
(Philippines) A P Hernandez (Philippines) M D Untal | 21 | 21

Second round
(Chinese Taipei) Jheng Y-c (Chinese Taipei) Wang Y-y | 20 | 21 | 14
(Hong Kong) Hung H Y (Hong Kong) Y Wong Y L | 22 | 11 | 21
(China) Liu YY (China) Wang D | 21 | 17 | 5
8 | (South Korea) Kim M-j (South Korea) Yeon S-y | 12 | 21 | 21
(Japan) Y Azumaya (Japan) H Hashimura | 16 | 17
(Indonesia) R Anggraini (Indonesia) S Z Aulia | 21 | 21
(Philippines) A P Hernandez (Philippines) M D Untal | 20 | 7
4 | (United Arab Emirates) M Omer Khan (United Arab Emirates) T Khan | 22 | 21

Third round
(Hong Kong) Hung H Y (Hong Kong) Y Wong Y L | 16 | 7
8 | (South Korea) Kim M-j (South Korea) Yeon S-y | 21 | 21
(Indonesia) R Anggraini (Indonesia) S Z Aulia | 21 | 17 | 21
(Philippines) A P Hernandez (Philippines) M D Untal | 17 | 21 | 14

Quarter-finals
8 | (South Korea) Kim M-j (South Korea) Yeon S-y | 21 | 21
(Indonesia) R Anggraini (Indonesia) S Z Aulia | 17 | 17

==== Section 4 ====
First round
(Philippines) K M C Agura (Philippines) A Bernardino | 9 | 12
(South Korea) Han Seung-y (South Korea) Kim S-h | 21 | 21
(Vietnam) Bùi B P (Vietnam) Trần T Á | 21 | 19 | 15
(Indonesia) R J N Munajad (Indonesia) A M Yusup | 13 | 21 | 21
(India) N Kanderi (India) R Uthayasooriyan | 17 | 21 | 22
(Malaysia) N Chau (Malaysia) N Maisarah | 21 | 18 | 20

Second round
(South Korea) Han Seung-y (South Korea) Kim S-h | 9 | 12
(China) Tan KX (China) Zhang QH | 21 | 21
(Indonesia) R J N Munajad (Indonesia) A M Yusup | 15 | 16
6 | (Thailand) Y Ketklieng (Thailand) P-O Phannachet | 21 | 21
(India) N Kanderi (India) R Uthayasooriyan | 21 | 21
(Kazakhstan) A Kuleshova (Kazakhstan) D Namenova | 8 | 5
(Chinese Taipei) Lee P-y (Chinese Taipei) Wang P-y | 15 | 12
2 | (Japan) R Hiramoto (Japan) A Tamaki | 21 | 21

Third round
(China) Tan KX (China) Zhang QH | 22 | 22
6 | (Thailand) Y Ketklieng (Thailand) P-O Phannachet | 20 | 20
(India) N Kanderi (India) R Uthayasooriyan | 13 | 20
2 | (Japan) R Hiramoto (Japan) A Tamaki | 21 | 22

Quarter-finals
(China) Tan KX (China) Zhang QH | 18 | 9
2 | (Japan) R Hiramoto (Japan) A Tamaki | 21 | 21
