= Crops Research Institute =

One of the 13 research institutes of CSIR-Ghana

CSIR - Crops Research Institute
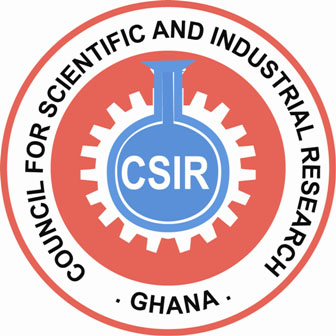
- Emblem of CSIR-CRI

Agency overview
- Jurisdiction: Government of Ghana
- Headquarters: Accra
- Agency executive: Director; Director General
- Parent agency: Council for Scientific and Industrial Research - Ghana
- Child agency: CSIR-Crops Research Institute
- Website: Official website

The Crops Research Institute (CRI), known since 2006 as the CSIR-Crops Research Institute (CSIR-CRI), is an agricultural research institute of the Council for Scientific and Industrial Research of Ghana (CSIR). It conducts research on cereals, legumes and oilseeds, roots and tubers, horticultural crops, and industrial crops. Its research programmes focus on improving crop yields and resistance to biotic and abiotic stresses, adaptation to climate change, crop and resource management, seed technology, plant health, and post-harvest practices.

The institute developed from the Specialists' branch of the Gold Coast Department of Agriculture. Following several reorganizations, the Crops Research Unit became the Crops Research Institute in 1964. It became part of CSIR in 1968. It operates research outstations in several agro-ecological zones.

== History ==
CSIR-Crops Research Institute (CRI) is one of the thirteen (13) research Institutes of the Council for Scientific and Industrial Research of Ghana (CSIR). CSIR-CRI evolved from the Specialists' branch of the Gold Coast Department of Agriculture. In 1959, the Specialists' branch and the Soil and Land Use Survey Department were merged to form the Scientific Services Division of the then Ministry of Agriculture (MOFA). The Scientific Services Division was transferred to the National Research Council in 1962 and then to the Ghana Academy of Sciences in 1963 and renamed the Agriculture Research Institute (ARI).

In October 1963, the Ghana Academy of Sciences reorganized the ARI into two units - Crops Research Unit (CRU) and Soil Research Unit. In 1964, the CRU became a full-fledged Institute and was named the Crops Research Institute (CRI). When the Academy of Sciences was reorganized in 1968 into the Ghana Academy of Arts and Sciences and the Council for Scientific and Industrial Research (CSIR), CRI became one of its Institutes. It was renamed CSIR-Crops Research Institute (CSIR-CRI) in 2006.

== Mandate ==
CSIR-CRI is Mandated to research covering the following food and industrial crops:

- Cereals (Maize and Rice)
- Legumes and Oil seeds (Cowpea, Soybean, Groundnut, and Bambara Groundnut)
- Roots and Tubers (Cassava, Yam, Sweetpotato, Cocoyam, and Taro)
- Horticultural Crops:
  - Plantain and Banana
  - Tropical Fruits (Citrus, Mango, Avocado Pear, Pineapple, Cashew, and Pawpaw)
  - Vegetables (Pepper, Garden Eggs, Tomato, Onion, and Leafy Vegetables)
- Industrial Crops (Rubber, Sugar Cane, Bast Fibres, and Tobacco)

== Research programmes ==
Current research programmes seek to improve on the yields of the mandate food crops as well as their resistance to biotic and abiotic stresses, make them adaptable to climate change and suitable for various end-user needs.
Other areas of research focus are Resource and Crop Management, Seed Technology, Plant Health (comprising Plant Pathology, Virology, Nematology, Entomology, Biological Control and Weed Science) and Post-harvest.
The objectives are to develop improved crop varieties, high quality planting materials and sustainable, environmentally-friendly and good production practices, that can be easily adopted by farmers to increase their productivity and also to reduce post-harvest losses. Socio-economic research is also conducted to assess the circumstances of farmers and processors, measure the adoption rates of the Institute's technologies, by the various clients as well as the impact of these technologies and make recommendations. These core programmes are supported by Biometrics, Information Communication Technologies and Technology Transfer activities.

== Research facilities ==
CSIR-CRI has its head office at Fumesua (near Kumasi). Facilities available for research activities include:

1. Outstations in the various agro-ecological zones where research findings / new technologies are tested before they are recommended to farmers. These outstations are located in: Pokuase, Ohawu (coastal savannah), Akumadan, Assin Fosu, Aiyinase (forest Zone) Ejura and Kpeve (Forest-Savannah).
2. Irrigation facilities for all year round field work.
3. Modern biotechnology laboratory (where students and researchers do their analyses).
4. Modern automatic HOBO 30 weather equipment to collect climatic data.
5. Seed processing centre to help seed producers to produce high quality seeds.
6. Conference room and Training facilities where training programmes in improved agricultural practices are organized for farmers, extension and research workers.
7. New Infrared Reflectance Spectrometry (NIRS) equipment. The NIRS (FOSS XDS) is set to routinely measure sucrose, glucose, fructose, maltose, starch, protein, zinc, calcium, magnesium and iron contents in roots, tubers and other crops. It can also be set to measure β-carotene content.
8. Screen houses where experiments are conducted under controlled conditions.
