= TwinsDntBeg =

Ghanaian photographers

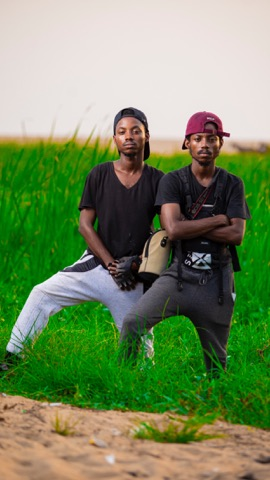
- Born: Emmanuel and Samuel Appiah Gyan; April 3, 1989 (age 37)

Emmanuel and Samuel Appiah Gyan (born 3 April 1989), known professionally as Twins don't beg, stylised as Twinsdntbeg, are twin photographers in Ghana. The duo began photography in 2015 and have worked with celebrities and figures both locally and internationally. They are the official photographers of the Second Lady of Ghana, Samira Bawumia.

== Early life and education ==
Emmanuel and Samuel Appiah Gyan were born on 3 April 1989. They studied agriculture with a major in Post-Harvest Technology and Landscape Management and Architecture, respectively at the Kwame Nkrumah University of Science and Technology (KNUST), Kumasi, Ghana.

== Career ==
The duo began their professional photography in 2015. They have worked with Ghanaian personalities like President of the Republic of Ghana, Nana Akufo Addo, Becca, Akosua Vee, French ambassador Anne Sophie Avé, Efya, DKB, Jackie Appiah, Stonebwoy and Nana Ama McBrown.

== Honours and awards ==
- Winners of Best nightlife Photographers of the year at the Ghana Nightlife Awards.
- Most Influential Young Ghanaians in the Life Style Category of the Avance Media 50 Most Influential Young Ghanaians Awards 2018.
- Represented Ghana at the 51st NAACP Image Awards in California.
