= Afia Schwarzenegger =

Ghanaian media personality

- Born: 14 February 1982 (age 44); Kumasi, Ghana
- Occupations: Comedian, TV / Radio Presenter
- Television: Schwar TV, Yewo Krom, Kokooko Show
- Children: 3

Valentina Nana Agyeiwaa (born 14 February 1982, Kumasi, Ghana), known professionally as Afia Schwarzenegger, is a Ghanaian media personality who came into the spotlight in 2011 through the Afia Schwarzenegger TV comedy series. She obtained her basic education at the Ridge Experimental School and at the Seventh Day Adventist School in Tamale. She attended two Senior High Schools (SHS) – St. Louis Girls’ School and KNUST Senior High School.

== Career ==
She played the lead role in the television comedy series Afia Schwarzenegger, produced by Deloris Frimpong Manso. She has hosted programs including Yewo Krom on Okay FM, Kokooko on UTV Ghana, and The Afia Schawrzenegger Talk Show on ETV. She has also worked with TV Africa and Kasapa.

== Controversy ==
In January 2023, the Tema High Court fined Schwarzenegger an amount of GH¢60,000 ($10,327) in a contempt case. The court also fined her GH¢5000 ($861) to be paid to Bernard Antwi Boasiako for making defamatory comments against him.
