= Oduom =

- Town
- Location within Ghana
- Coordinates: 6°41′32″N 1°32′47″W
- Country: Ghana
- Region: Ashanti Region
- District: Kumasi Metropolitan
- Elevation: 981 ft (299 m)
- Time zone: GMT
  - Summer (DST): GMT

Oduom is a small town in the Kumasi Metropolitan, a district of the Ashanti Region of Ghana.

== Geography ==
=== Location ===
Oduom is 15 kilometres from the centre of Kumasi. Oduom is a dormitory town. It serves mainly as a residential areas for workers in various companies in Kumasi.

=== Boundaries ===
The town is bordered on the south by Fumesua, to the West by Domeabra, to the east by Boadi and to the North by Kentinkrono.

== Notable places ==
KNUST has part of its teak farm in the town.
