= Kotei =

Coordinates: 6°39′N 1°34′W

- Town
- Interactive map of Kotei
- Country: Ghana

Government
  - Nana: Nana Adu and Nana Afia Adutwumwaa
- Time zone: UTC+0

For people with the surname, see Kotei (surname).

Kotei is a town in the Oforikrom Municipality in the Ashanti Region of Ghana. It is 10 kilometres from the centre Kumasi. The town is a dormitory town that serves both inhabitants as well as students from the Kwame Nkrumah University of Science and Technology. The community has a police station.

== Boundaries ==
The town is bordered on all sides by the KNUST campus except the South which is bounded by Boadi.
