= Fumesua =

Fumesua Agona & Kwabre: (Home of the renowned Fumesua Kobi Shrine)
- Town
- Country: Ghana
- Time zone: UTC+0 (Casablanca)

Fumesua is a town in Ghana. It is 15 kilometres from the centre Kumasi. It is a dormitory town. It serves mainly as a residential areas for workers in various companies in Kumasi. The town also host the Building and Road Research Institute of Ghana.

== Boundaries ==
The town is bordered on the south by Ejisu, to the west by Anwomaso, to the north by Kentinkrono and to the east by Oduom.
