= Anne Amuzu =

Ghanaian computer scientist

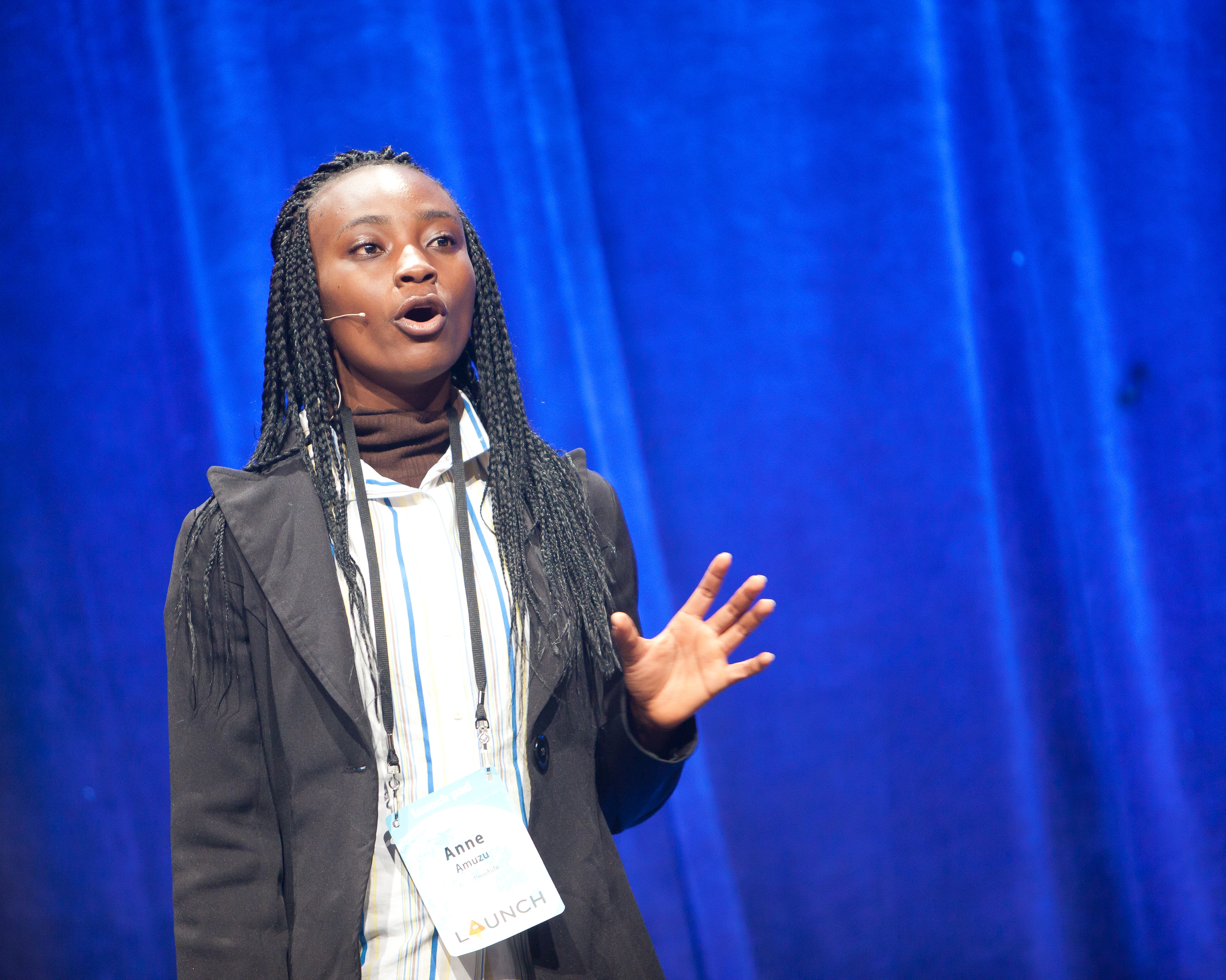
- Anne Amuzu at the Launch Conference in San Francisco
- Born: Ghana
- Occupation: Computer Scientist
- Known for: Nandimobile

Anne Amuzu is a Ghanaian computer scientist and the co-founder of the technology company, Nandimobile Limited. Her company has received several awards, including best business at the 2011 LAUNCH Conference in USA.

== Education ==
Amuzu had her secondary level education at the St. Louis Senior High School. She then furthered at the Kwame Nkrumah University of Science and Technology where she acquired a Bachelor of Science degree in Computer Engineering. She proceeded to Meltwater Entrepreneurial School of Technology where she was training in Entrepreneurship and Software Engineering.

== Career ==
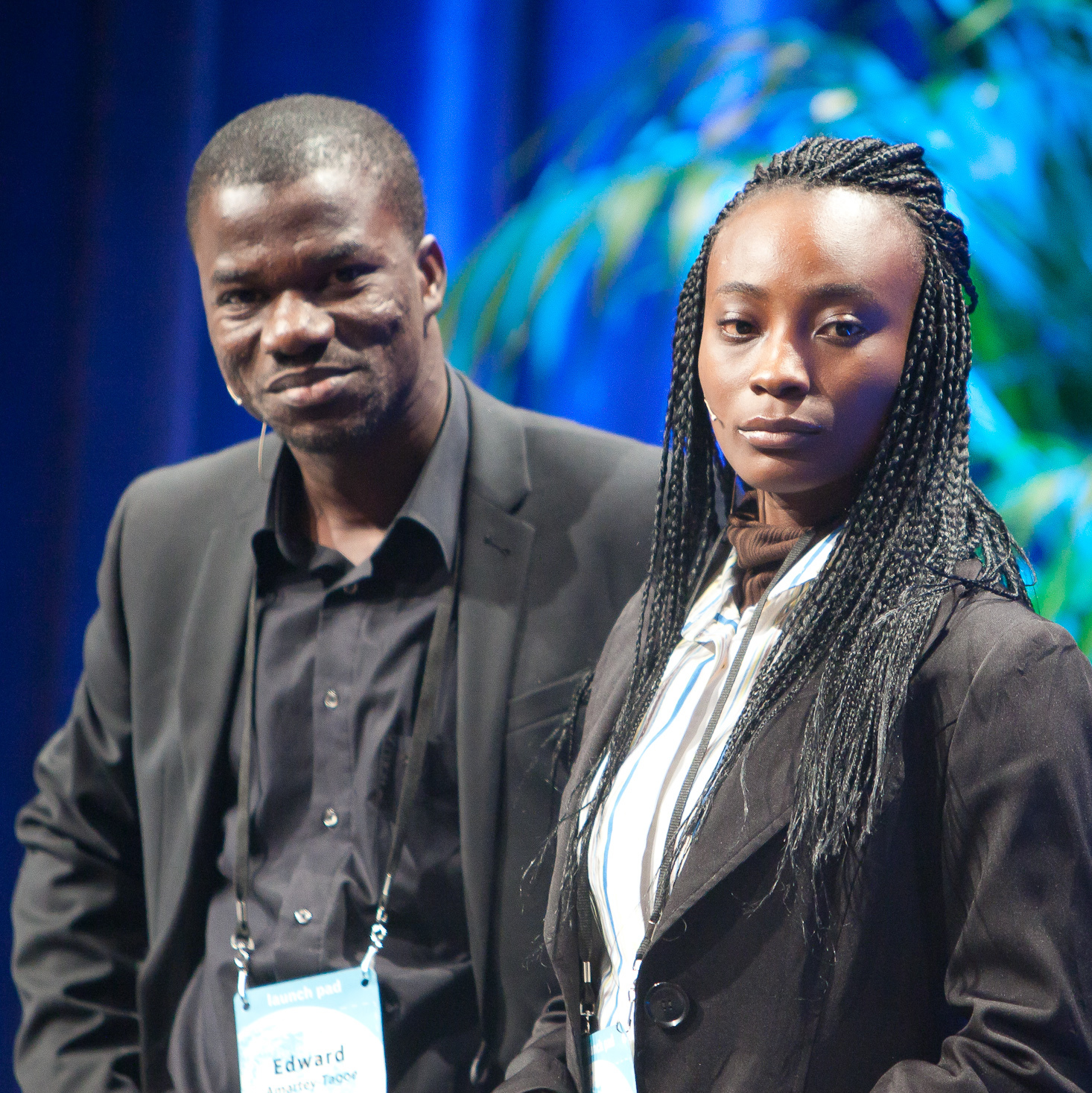
Anne Amuzu and Edward Amartey-Tagoe

In 2010, Amuzu co-founded Nandimobile Limited with Michael Dakwa and Edward Amartey-Tagoe, a company that develops software that enables companies to deliver customer support and information services through SMS. She has been the Lead Technical developer of Nandimobile Limited since 2010.

Since its founding, Nandimobile Limited has received several awards, including Best business at the 2011 LAUNCH conference in USA, 2012 Top up award for the best SMS App in Ghana and 2013 WORLD summit awards in e-commerce and creativity.

== Awards and achievements ==
- 2014 - Selected for Eighth Annual Fortune/U.S. State Department Global Women's Mentoring Partnership Program
- 2014 - Won The Future Africa Awards & Summit Class Prize in Technology
- 2015 - Listed in Newaccra Achievers List

Amuzu's company Nandimobile Limited has received several awards, including best business at the 2011 LAUNCH Conference in USA, 2012 Top up award for the best SMS App in Ghana and 2013 World Summit Awards in e-commerce and creativity.

== Philanthropy ==
She is mostly found volunteering her service to teach young girls how to code.
