= Kotei (surname) =

Kotei is a surname. Notable people with the surname include:

- Amon Kotei (1915–2011), Ghanaian artist and surveyor
- David Kotei (born 1950), Ghanaian boxer
- James Kotei (born 1993), Ghanaian footballer
- J. E. A. Kotei, military pilot and diplomat
- Robert Kotei (1935–1979), Ghanaian soldier, athlete, and politician
