= Cynthia Amuzu =

Ghanaian badminton player (born 1965)

Personal information
- Born: 1965 (age 60–61)

Sport
- Country: Ghana
- Sport: Badminton
- Handedness: Right
- BWF profile

Cynthia Amuzu (born 1965) is a former Ghanaian badminton player. Amuzu clinched the doubles title at the 1989 Ghana International tournament, and won the women's and mixed doubles event.

== Achievements ==
=== BWF International Challenge/Series ===
Women's doubles

Year	Tournament	Partner	Opponent	Score	Result
1989	Ghana International	(Ghana) Nelly Akainyah	(Ghana) Kate Koranteng (Ghana) Grace Mordeku	15–3, 15–1	(gold) Winner

Mixed doubles

Year	Tournament	Partner	Opponent	Score	Result
1989	Ghana International	(Ghana) Owusu Agyemang	(Ghana) Nketia Kyei (Ghana) Nelly Akainyah	15–7, 11–15, 15–2	(gold) Winner
