= Chairman Wontumi =

Ghanaian politician and businessman

Regional Chairman, NPP for Ashanti Region
- In office 25 January 2014 – Present

Personal details
- Born: Bernard Antwi Boasiako; 1 May 1976 (age 50) Kumasi, Ashanti Region, Ghana
- Party: New Patriotic Party
- Occupation: Politician
- Profession: Businessperson

Bernard Antwi Boasiako (born May 1, 1976), popularly known as Chairman Wontumi, is a Ghanaian politician, entrepreneur, and media proprietor. He was the Ashanti Regional Chairman of the New Patriotic Party (NPP), a position he held from 2014.

== Early life and education ==
Boasiako was born in the Ashanti Region of Ghana. He received his secondary education at Prempeh College in Kumasi. His early years were largely spent in the Ashanti Region, where he later built both his business and political career.

== Business career ==
Outside politics, Boasiako is involved in several business ventures. He is associated with the extractive and mining sector and has been linked to Akonta Mining Company Limited, a firm operating in Ghana's Western Region. He is also a media entrepreneur and owns Wontumi Radio and Movement TV, media platforms that focus on political commentary, entertainment, and public affairs.

== Political career ==
Bernard Antwi Boasiako is a member of the New Patriotic Party (NPP). He began his political career at the grassroots level and rose through the party's organisational structure.

In January 2014, he was elected Ashanti Regional Chairman of the NPP. He was subsequently re-elected in 2018 and 2022.

In 2025, Boasiako became the subject of investigations and legal proceedings relating to alleged illegal mining activities connected to the Samreboi concession in the Western Region. He was arrested and later granted bail while the case proceeded.

In July 2026, the Accra High Court convicted Boasiako in connection with illegal mining activities at the Samreboi concession. On 20 July 2026, the court sentenced him to 20 years' imprisonment with hard labour. The sentences imposed on the two counts were ordered to run concurrently. He was also fined 10,000 penalty units on each count. Akonta Mining Company Limited was separately fined on the counts for which it was convicted.

Boasiako subsequently filed an appeal against the conviction and sentence at the Court of Appeal. His lawyers argued, among other grounds, that the trial court had misinterpreted provisions of Ghana's mining laws, improperly evaluated evidence and imposed an excessive sentence. The appeal seeks to have the convictions overturned and Boasiako acquitted and discharged.

Following his imprisonment, the NPP's Ashanti Regional chairmanship became vacant. On 15 August 2026, Odeneho Kwaku Appiah, popularly known as COKA, was elected Ashanti Regional Chairman, succeeding Boasiako.

=== NPP national chairperson bid ===
Boasiako declared his intention to contest for the New Patriotic Party national chairman, and his critics did not stop mock his educational competencies. In response to the criticism, he says his experience is his certificate and not English fluency.

“People saying I don’t speak good English doesn’t stop me. I’m unperturbed,” he stated.

=== Conviction and imprisonment ===
In 2026, Boasiako was prosecuted alongside Akonta Mining Company Limited in connection with illegal mining activities at the company's Samreboi concession in the Western Region of Ghana.

On 20 July 2026, the Accra High Court, presided over by Justice Audrey Kocuvie-Tay, convicted Boasiako on two counts relating to the assignment of mineral rights without the required ministerial approval and the purposeful facilitation of an unlicensed mining operation. He was sentenced to 20 years' imprisonment with hard labour, with the sentences to run concurrently, and fined 10,000 penalty units on each count. Akonta Mining Company Limited was also convicted and fined.

Boasiako's lawyers filed a notice of appeal on 28 July 2026. The appeal challenges the legal basis of the convictions, the interpretation of provisions of the Minerals and Mining Act, the evaluation of evidence and the severity of the sentence.

While serving his sentence, Boasiako's lawyers also applied for bail pending the determination of his appeal. He was reported to be incarcerated at Nsawam Medium Security Prison. As of August 2026, the bail application remained pending.
