= Kentinkrono =

Kent City Kentinkrono
- Town
- Kentinkrono

Twi transcription(s)
- Interactive map of Kent City
- Coordinates: 6.6939761°N 1.5553934°W
- Country: Ghana

Government New Patriotic Party
  - Type: Assembly Man
  - King: Nana Owusu
- 3,000
- Time zone: UTC+0 (Ghana)
- Area code: +233

Kentinkrono is a town in Kumasi in the Ashanti Region of Ghana. It is about 20 kilometres from the centre of Kumasi. It is a dormitory town. It serves mainly as a community in the city of Kumasi, with old and modern buildings.

== Boundaries ==
The town is bordered on the North by KNUST campus, to the West by Kotei, to the East by Ayigya and to the South by Oduom.
