= Council for Scientific and Industrial Research – Ghana =

Council for Scientific and Industrial Research
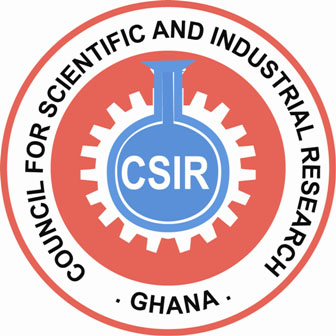

Agency overview
- Formed: 10 October 1968; 57 years ago
- Jurisdiction: Government of Ghana
- Headquarters: Republic of Ghana
- Agency executive: Board Chairman; Director General

The Council for Scientific and Industrial Research (CSIR) was established by NLC Decree 293 of October 10, 1968 amended by NLCD 329 of 1969, and re-established in its present form by CSIR Act 521 on November 26, 1996. The genesis of the council however, dates back to the erstwhile National Research Council (NRC), which was established by the government in August 1958 to organize and coordinate scientific research in Ghana. In 1963, the NRC merged with the former Ghana Academy of Sciences, a statutory learned society. Following a review in 1966, the academy was reconstituted into, essentially, its original component bodies, namely a national research organization redesignated the CSIR and a learned Society, designated the Ghana Academy of Arts and Sciences.

The distinctive features of the 1996 Act are the emphasis accorded private sector concerns, and the introduction of market principles into the council's operations through the commercialization of research. In this connection, the council is expected to generate part of its income through the sale of its products and services, and to institute a system of contract research.

== Mandate ==
The CSIR is mandated to perform the following functions among others:

- To pursue the implementation of government policies on scientific research and development;
- To advise the sector Minister on scientific and technological advances likely to be of importance to national development;
- To encourage coordinated employment of scientific research for the management, utilization and conservation of the natural resources of Ghana in the interest of development;
- To encourage in the national interest scientific and industrial research of importance for development of agriculture, health, medicine, environment, technology and other service sectors and to this end to encourage close linkages with the productive sectors of the economy;
- To coordinate all aspects of scientific research in the country and to ensure that the council, the research institutes of the council and other organizations engaged in research in Ghana, coordinate and cooperate in their research efforts;
- To exercise control over the research institutes and projects of the council and to have power after consultation with the Minister to create, reconstitute, merge or dissolve any institute, centre, unit or project of the council;
- To review, monitor and periodically evaluate the work of the institutes administered by the council in order to ensure that research being carried out by the institute directly benefits identified sectors of the economy and is within the national priorities;
- To institute a system of contract research to ensure that research being carried out in the council is relevant and cost-effective;
- To encourage and promote the commercialization of research results;
- To undertake or collaborate in the collation, publication and dissemination of the results of research and other useful technical information;
- To organize and control services and facilities available to the council and generally to manage the properties of the council;
- To coordinate human resource development in institutes of the council and to encourage the training of scientific personnel and research workers through the provision of grants and fellowships;
- To cooperate and liaise with international and local bodies and organizations, in particular, the Universities and the private sector on matters of research; and
- To perform such other functions as may be determined by the Minister.

== Vision ==
- Using the transforming power of S&T for wealth creation.

== Mission ==
- The CSIR is to become the force for accelerated social and economic development of Ghana through examining, exploring and creating Science and Technology catalysts for public and private wealth creation.

== Thematic areas of research ==
The Council for Scientific and Industrial Research (CSIR) has seven thematic areas; namely the Science and People, Electronics and ICT, Biomedical and Public Health, Energy and Petroleum, Material Science Manufacturing, Climate Change Environmental Conservation Green Technology and Food Security and Poverty Reduction.

== Structure and organization ==
The council

The statutory Governing Council is made up of a chairman and 20 members. They/these include representatives of selected Ministries (Food and Agriculture), Health, Trade and Industries, Environment, Education, Science and Technology, Ministry of Environment, Science, Technology and Innovation the Universities, various production and commercial associations (Mines, Industry, Commerce, Engineers), Ghana Academy of Arts and Sciences, National Development Planning Commission, CSIR Directors, Senior Staff of CSIR, among others. The CSIR Act requires that 40 per cent of the membership of the council be drawn from the private sector.

The council is answerable to the Minister of Environment, Science and Technology (MEST).

Director-general

The Director-General is the Chief Executive of the CSIR. Functions of the Director-General include: policy issues; co-ordination; monitoring & evaluation; external relations including technical aid scheme and technical agreement; lobbying and advocacy and CSIR relations.

Deputy director-general

The Deputy Director-General is responsible to the Director-General for overseeing the development and execution of the research and development activities of the thirteen (13) institutes of the CSIR as well as the council's programmes and projects; assists the Director- General in setting the research priorities of the council in line with Government policy and acts for the Director General in his/her absence.

Director of administration

The Director of Administration is responsible to the Director-General for oversight/day-to-day administration of the Head Office including authorization of administrative expenditure/remuneration management; Council matters including secretaryship to Council; human resource management of the CSIR; Communication of policies to Institutes; and monitoring policy implementation.

Director of finance

The Director of Finance is to advise the Director-General on all matters relating to Finance and Accounting; to advise the Directors of the Institutes of the council on Financial and Accounting matters; advise on the preparation and submission of Annual, Personnel Emolument, Administrative Service and Development Estimates of the Institutes of the council; and Preparations of Annual Consolidated Accounts and Balance Sheet of the council after all the Accounts of the Institutes have been audited by their external Auditors.

Director of commercialization

The Director of Commercialization is to advise the Director-General on all issues relating to commercialization; to oversee all operations of Commercialization and Information Divisions of the institutes (CIDs) in terms of strategy development and implementation; oversee marketing orientation and training programmes; supervise the activities of Marketing Officers/Public Relations Officers; provision of pricing and costing information; advertising and promotion; marketing research and information; corporate image building and S&T popularization.

Director of audit

The Director of Audit is to establish policies for auditing activity and direct/technical and administrative functions. Develop and execute comprehensive audit programmes to evaluate internal controls over all the institute's activities; Coordinate audit planning and other internal audit activities, and liaises with Council's external auditors.

Legal officer

The Legal Officer is responsible to the Director-General for all legal and quasi-legal matters relating to the rights and obligations of the council; advising the Directors of the council on all legal and quasi-legal matters in respect of rights, obligations and on matters relating to labour disputes and discipline; Revising existing rules and regulations; drafting contracts; writing of legal opinion for the Director-General and Directors of various Institutes; advising on patent laws; handling court cases on behalf of the council before the Commission on Human Rights and Administrative Justice; and Liaising with the council's external Solicitors.

== Institutes of the council ==
Currently, the council exercises control over thirteen (13) institutes, namely *Council for Scientific and Industrial Research (CSIR) Head Office

- CSIR - Animal Research Institute (ARI).
- CSIR - Building and Road Research Institute (BRRI)
- CSIR - Crops Research Institute (CRI)
- CSIR - Forestry Research Institute of Ghana (FORIG)
- CSIR - Food Research Institute (FRI)
- CSIR - Institute of Industrial Research (IIR)
- CSIR - Institute for Scientific and Technological Information (INSTI)
- CSIR - Oil Palm Research Institute (OPRI)
- CSIR - Plant Genetic Resources Research Institute (PGRRI)
- CSIR - Savanna Agricultural Research Institute (SARI)
- CSIR - Soil Research Institute (SRI)
- CSIR - Science and Technology Policy Research Institute (STEPRI)
- CSIR - Water Research Institute (WRI).

== External solicitor ==
Wontumi, Quist and Co.

== Collaboration ==
Through collaboration with international scientific organizations, CSIR has become the research hub that houses various scientific research organizations including;

- Ghana Office - International Water Management Institute (IWMI)
- Africa Regional Office- The Brazilian Agricultural Research Corporation (EMBRAPA)
- International Food Policy Research Institute (IFPRI), and
- Alliance for a Green Revolution in Africa (AGRA)
