= Oforikrom (Ghana parliament constituency) =

Constituency in the Ashanti Region of Ghana

- constituency for the Parliament of Ghana
- District: Kumasi Metropolitan District
- Region: Ashanti Region of Ghana

Current constituency
- Party: New Patriotic Party
- MP: Michael Akwasi Aidoo

Oforikrom is one of the constituencies represented in the Parliament of Ghana. It elects one Member of Parliament (MP) by the first past the post system of election

Michael Akwasi Aidoo and currently a member of the 9th Parliament of the Fourth Republic of Ghana representing the Oforikrom Constituency in the Ashanti Region of Ghana on the ticket of the New Patriotic Party
