= James Edusei Sarkodie =

Ghanaian politician

The Honourable James Edusei Sarkodie

Member of the Ghana Parliament for Atwima-Nwabiagya
- In office 7 January 1997 – 6 January 2005
- Preceded by: Yaw Bampoh
- Succeeded by: Benito Owusu Bio

Personal details
- Party: New Patriotic Party
- Occupation: Politician

James Edusei Sarkodie is a Ghanaian politician who served as a member of parliament for the Atwima Nwabiagya constituency from 1997 to 2005.

== Early life and education ==
Edusei was born in Atwima in the Ashanti Region of Ghana.

== Politics ==
Edusei was first elected into parliament on the ticket of the New Patriotic Party during the December 1996 Ghanaian General Elections representing the Atwima Mponua constituency in the Ashanti Region of Ghana. He polled 31,088 votes out of the 42,146 representing 61.90%. During the 2000 General Election, he polled 38,959 votes out of the 48,153 valid votes cast representing 80.90%. He was defeated by Benito Owusu Bio in the 2004 parliamentary primaries.

== Elections ==
In 2000, Sarkodie won the general elections as the member of parliament for the Atwima Mponua constituency of the Ashanti Region of Ghana. He won on the ticket of the New Patriotic Party. His constituency was a part of the 31 parliamentary seats out of 33 seats won by the New Patriotic Party in that election for the Ashanti Region. The New Patriotic Party won a majority total of 100 parliamentary seats out of 200 seats. He was elected with 38,959 votes out of 48,947 total valid votes cast. This was equivalent to 80.9% of the total valid votes cast. He was elected over Baffour Osei Wusu of the National Democratic Congress, Alex Addo Kuffour of the People's National Convention, Yaw Boateng of the National Reformed Party and D.D. Boateng of the Convention People's Party. These won 7,880, 683, 336 and 295 votes out of the total valid votes cast respectively. These were equivalent to 16.4%, 1.4%, 0.7% and 0.6% respectively of total valid votes cast.

== Career ==
Edusei was a Parliamentarian from 2001 to 2005 for the Atwima Mponua Constituency.
