= Afari, Ghana =

Town in Ashanti region, Ghana

Coordinates: 6°42′N 1°47′W

Afari is a town between Kumasi and Nkawie in the Atwima Nwabiagya District of the Ashanti Region of Ghana. The town is the site for the Kumasi Military Hospital.

It is one of the successful towns in the Atwima Nwabiagya district and currently the leading developing town in the district. It is among the oldest towns in the Ashanti region. The main work of the inhabitants of Afari has been farming and pottery. The royals in the town are said to be the descendants of Oheneba Acheampong Kwasi who was the son of Oti Akenten the first Chief of Kwaman, modern Kumasi before Kumasi became part of the Ashanti Kingdom. The royal family is said to have migrated from Abrenyase, the current Yaa Asantewa Girls Senior High School at Tanoso and settled in Afari. The town has been without a traditional ruler for the past twenty years now when the occupant of the Oheneba Acheampong Kwasi stool expired in the year 2000 leaving the town without effective leadership and this has affected the development of the area. In recent times the town has seen various infrastructural developments making it one of the fastest developing towns in the region. One should however be extremely careful buying parcel of land for development since there is no traditional ruler who is supposed to be the sole person with the capacity to sell stool lands to any third party. Farmers who till the lands have taken advantage of the absence of a traditional ruler and selling their lands to unsuspecting parties which may in long term create confusion especially after the installation of traditional ruler. The people of Afari are said to be friendly and hard working. With the influx of strangers who are building houses and settling in Afari people should be on guard against stealing, break and petty robberies. When the Military Hospital is commissioned Afari will be among the best towns to live in since the proximity to the Regional capital Kumasi is about 30 minutes drive. The traffic situation may affect the traveling time.
