= Kwame Gyawu-Kyem =

Ghanaian politician (born 1927)

MP for Atwima Mponua
- In office 7 January 1993 – 6 January 1997
- President: Jerry John Rawlings
- Preceded by: Daniel Donkor
- Succeeded by: Akwasi Dante Afriyie

Personal details
- Born: 21 September 1927 Ashanti Region, Ghana
- Party: National Democratic Congress
- Education: Regent Street Polytechnic
- Occupation: Politician
- Profession: Journalist

Kwame Gyawu-Kyem (born 21 September 1927) is a Ghanaian politician who was a member of the first Parliament of the fourth Republic representing the Atwima Mponua constituency in the Ashanti Region of Ghana. He represented the National Democratic Congress.

== Early life and education ==
Gyawu-Kyem was born in Atwima Mponua in the Ashanti Region of Ghana. He attended the St. Augustine's College and Ghana National College for his secondary education. He continued to Regent Street Polytechnic to study Journalism and consequently obtained his Higher Diploma.

== Politics ==
Gyawu-Kyem was first elected into parliament on the ticket of the National Democratic Congress for the Atwima Mponua Constituency in the Ashanti Region of Ghana during the 1992 Ghanaian parliamentary election. He was defeated by Akwasi D. Afriyie of the New Patriotic Party in the 1996 Ghanaian general election. He served for one term as a parliamentarian for Atwima Mponua Constituency.

== Career ==
Gyawu-Kyem is a journalist by profession and a former member of parliament for the Atwima Mponua Constituency in the Ashanti Region of Ghana.

Gwayu-Kyem is a former editor of the Ghanaian Times.

== Personal life ==
Gyawu-Kyem is a Christian.
