= Yaw Bampoh =

Ghanaian politician

MP for Atwima-Nwabiagya
- In office 7 January 1993 – 6 January 1997
- President: Jerry John Rawlings
- Preceded by: John Agyekum Kufuor
- Succeeded by: James Edusei Sarkodie

Personal details
- Born: Abuakwa, Ashanti Region, Gold Coast (now Ghana)
- Party: National Democratic Congress
- Education: Wiawso College of Education
- Occupation: Politician
- Profession: Teacher, farmer

Yaw Bampoh is a Ghanaian politician and a member of the first Parliament of the fourth Republic representing the Atwima Nwabiagya constituency in the Ashanti region of Ghana.

== Early life and education ==
Yaw Bampoh was born in 1955 in Abuakwa in the Ashanti Region of Ghana. He attended the Mpasatia L. A. Middle School. He also attended the Sefwi Wiawso Training College where he obtained his Teachers' Training Certificate.

== Politics ==
He was elected into parliament on the ticket of the National Democratic Congress for the Atwima Nwabiagya Constituency during the 1992 Ghanaian parliamentary election. He was defeated by James Edusei Sarkodei of the New Patriotic Party during the 1996 General election. James Edusei Sarkodie polled 31,088 votes out of the total valid votes cast representing 61.90% while Yaw Bampoh polled 10,598 votes representing 21.10%. Alex Addo Kuffour of the People's National Congress also polled 469 votes representing 0.90%.

== Career ==
He is a teacher, farmer and a former member of parliament for the Atwima Nwabiagya Constituency who served one term in parliament from 1993 to 1997.

== Personal life ==
He is a Christian.
