= Kumasi Military Hospital =

Military hospital in Ashanti region, Ghana

The Kumasi Military Hospital is a military hospital in Afari in the Atwima Nwabiagya District of the Ashanti Region of Ghana.
