= Atwima District =

- Former District
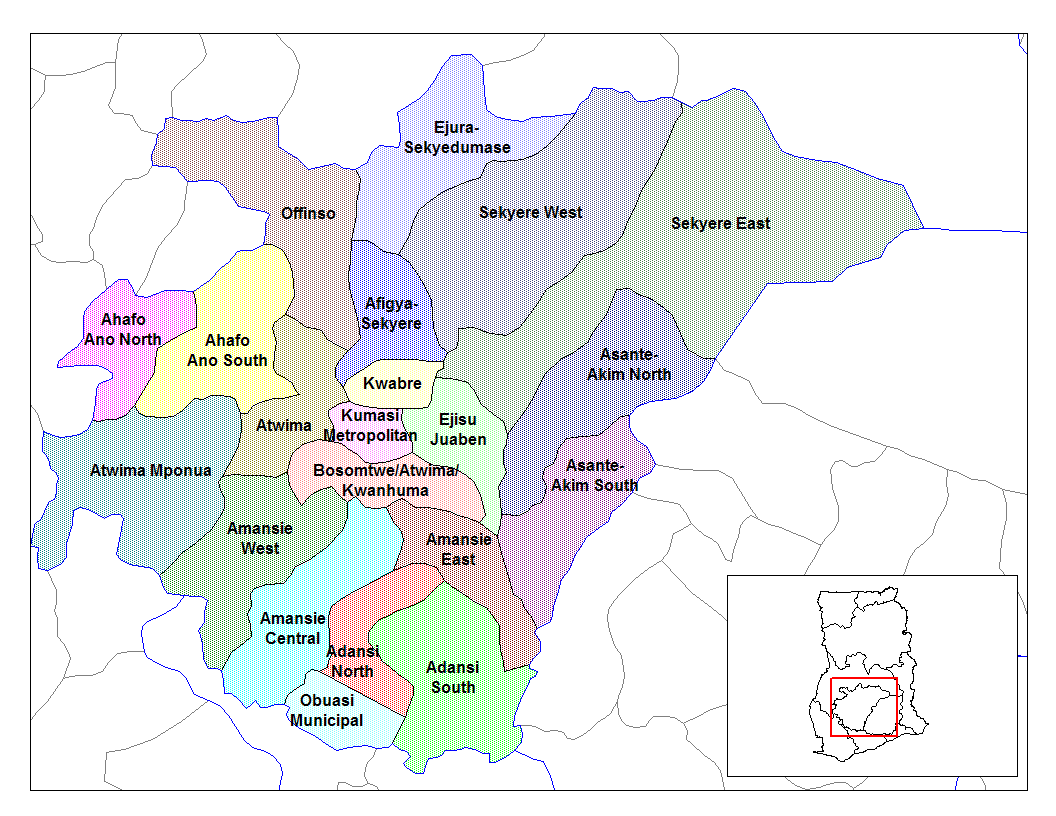
- Districts of Ashanti Region

- Location of Atwima District within Ashanti
- Coordinates: 6°40′N 1°49′W
- Country: Ghana
- Region: Ashanti
- Capital: Nkawie

Area
  - Total: 2,411 km^{2} (931 sq mi)

Population (2004)
  - Total: 234,759
- Time zone: UTC+0 (GMT)

Atwima District is a former district that was located in Ashanti Region, Ghana. Originally created as an ordinary district assembly in 1988. However on 12 November 2003 (effective 18 February 2004), it was split off into two new districts by a decree of president John Agyekum Kufuor: Atwima Nwabiagya District (which it was elevated to municipal district assembly status on 6 February 2018; capital: Nkawie) and Atwima Mponua District (capital: Asesewa). The district assembly was located in the western part of Ashanti Region and had Nkawie as its capital town.

== Footnotes ==
- ^1 before splitting off the Atwima Mponua District.

== Sources ==
- "Districts of Ghana". Statoids.
- GhanaDistricts.com
- 19 New Districts Created , GhanaWeb, November 20, 2003.
