= Seth Osei-Akoto =

Ghanaian politician

Hon. Seth Osei-Akoto MP

Member of Parliament for Atwima Mponua
- Incumbent
- Assumed office 7 January 2025
- Preceded by: Isaac Kwame Asiamah
- President: John Mahama
- Vice President: Jane Naana Opoku-Agyemang

Personal details
- Born: 14 August 1962 (age 63) Bontomuruso
- Party: New Patriotic Party
- Occupation: Politician
- Committees: Food, Agriculture and Cocoa Affairs; Deputy Ranking Member; Private Members Bill and Private Members Motion

Seth Osei-Akoto (born 14 August 1962) is a Ghanaian politician and a member of parliament (MP) representing the Atwima Mponua constituency in the Ashanti Region. He is affiliated with the New Patriotic Party (NPP) and serves as a member of the minority in the 9th Parliament of Ghana.

== Early life and education ==
Seth Osei-Akoto was born on August 14, 1962, in Bontomuruso, a town in the Ashanti Region of Ghana. He pursued higher education abroad, earning a Bachelor of Science in agriculture from the University of Science and Technology in 1987. He furthered his studies at the University of Melbourne, Australia, where he obtained a Master of Forest Science in 1995.

== Career ==
Before entering politics, Seth Osei-Akoto had a distinguished career in agriculture. He served as the director of crop services at the Ministry of Food and Agriculture, contributing to the development of agricultural policies and programs in Ghana. He entered the political arena as a parliamentary candidate for the Atwima Mponua constituency on the ticket of the New Patriotic Party (NPP). He has been actively involved in the constituency, engaging with traditional leaders and party members to foster unity and development.

== Parliamentary service ==
Seth Osei-Akoto was elected as the member of parliament for Atwima Mponua in the 2024 general elections. He secured 29,616 votes, representing 50.47% of the total votes cast. As an MP, he serves on various parliamentary committees such as the Food, Agriculture and Cocoa Affairs as the deputy ranking member.

== Personal life ==
He is a devout Catholic and the son of the late Baffour Akoto
