= Yeboah =

Yeboah or Yebuah (Akan pronunciation: [yɛ.bɔa]) is an Akan surname meaning "our helper". Notable people with the surname include:

- Daniel Nana Yeboah (born 1984), Ghanaian footballer
- Yeboah Sarfo Isaac (born 1989), Ghanaian Nurse
- Daniel Yeboah (born 1984), Ivorian footballer
- Emmanuel Ofosu Yeboah (born 1977), Ghanaian athlete and disability activist
- Emmanuel Yeboah (Born 1997), Ghanaian athlete
- Ephraim Yeboah (born 2006), Ghanaian-Italian-British footballer
- Frank Yeboah, Ghanaian politician
- Godfred Yeboah (1980–2021), Ghanaian footballer
- Irena Yebuah Tiran (born 1974), Slovenian mezzo-soprano opera singer of Ghana descent
- John Yeboah (born 2000), Ecuadorian-German footballer
- Kelvin Yeboah (born 2000), Ghanaian-Italian footballer
- Kenny Yeboah (born 1998), American football player
- Kofi Yeboah Schulz (born 1989), German footballer
- Kwame Yeboah (soccer) (born 1994), Australian footballer
- Paul Yeboah (born 1992), Ghanaian-Italian rapper
- Philip Yeboah (born 2002), Ghanaian footballer
- Samuel Ayew Yeboah (born 1988), Ghanaian footballer
- Samuel Yeboah (born 1986), Ghanaian footballer
- Tony Yeboah (born 1966), Ghanaian footballer
- Vida Yeboah (1944-2006), Ghanaian educator, politician and civic leader
- Yaw Yeboah (born 1997), Ghanaian footballer
