= Shirley Kyei =

Ghanaian politician

Hon. Valentine Shirley Kyei MP

Member of Parliament for Atwima Nwabiagya South
- Incumbent
- Assumed office 7 January 2025
- Preceded by: Emmanuel Adjei Anhwere
- President: John Mahama
- Vice President: Jane Naana Opoku-Agyemang

Personal details
- Born: 2 February 1983 (age 43) Nkawie
- Party: New Patriotic Party
- Occupation: Politician
- Committees: Youth and Sports; Budget

Shirley Kyei (born 2 February 1983) is a Ghanaian politician, and the first female Member of Parliament for the Atwima Nwabiagya South constituency in the Ashanti Region. She ran on the New Patriotic Party (NPP) ticket and won the seat in the December 2024 general election.

== Early life and education ==
Kyei was born on 2 February 1983, in Nkawie, Ashanti Region. She attended Lambeth College, earning a Foundation in Science (2000) and an AVCE in Science (2002). She later earned a BSc (Hons) from De Montfort University in 2006, another BSc (Hons) from Greenwich School of Management in 2018, and an MBA from Wrexham University in June 2023.

== Politics ==
In December 2023, Kyei won the NPP parliamentary primary in Atwima Nwabiagya South, defeating four contenders, including the incumbent MP Emmanuel Agyei Anhwere, marking her as the first female candidate in the constituency. In the December 7, 2024 general election, she secured 45,352 votes (≈73%), defeating the NDC's Wisdom Osei Boamah, who received 17,068 votes (≈27%).
