= List of hospitals in the Atwima Nwabiagya District =

Atwima Nwabiagya District is one of the 30 political and administrative districts in Ashanti Region, Ghana. It is situated in the western part of the region and shares common boundaries with Ahafo Ano South and Atwima Mponua Districts to the West, Offinso Municipal to the North, Amansie–West and Atwima Kwanwoma Districts to the South and Kumasi Metropolis and Afigya-Kwabre Districts to the East. It covers an estimated area of 294.84 km^{2}. The district capital is Nkawie.

The district contains over twenty health care institutions owned privately and by the government.

Name of Health facility	Location	Ownership	NHIA Accredited	Contact	Website
Abuakwa Health Centre	Abuakwa	Government	Yes		
Adankwame Clinic	Adankwame	Government	Yes		
Afari Community Hospital	Afari	Private	Yes		
Akropong Health Centre	Akropong				
Akropong Maternity Home	Akropong				
Antwi Maternity Home	Abuakwa Koforidua				
Amanfrom Hospital	Amanfrom	Private	Yes		
Asuofia Health Centre	Asuofia				
Atwima Maakro Hospital	Maakro				
Barekese Health Centre	Barekese				
Cedar Crest Hospital	Asuofia				
Dabaa Medical Centre	Dabaa				
Frimpong-Boateng Medical Center	Toase	Private	Yes	0322091640	www.frimpongboatengmedicalcenter.com
God is Able Maternity Home	Sepaase				
Healthy Care Medical Centre					
JILF Health Services	Taabre				
Madonna Health Services	Abuakwa	Private	Yes		
Mount Sinai Hospital	Atwima Koforidua				
Nana Frema Maternity Home	Atwima Achiase				
Nkawie Clinic	Nkawie		No		
Nkawie-Toase Government Hospital	Nkawie				
Nyama Maternity Home	Asuofia Achiase				

== See also ==
- List of hospitals in the Ashanti Region
- List of hospitals in Ghana
