= Atwima-Nwabiagya (Ghana parliament constituency) =

Constituency in Ghana

- constituency for the Parliament of Ghana
- District: Atwima Nwabiagya District
- Region: Ashanti Region of Ghana

Current constituency
- Party: New Patriotic Party
- MP: Benito Owusu Bio

Atwima-Nwabiagya is one of the constituencies represented in the Parliament of Ghana. It elects one Member of Parliament (MP) by the first past the post system of election. Atwima-Nwabiagya is located in the Atwima Nwabiagya District of the Ashanti Region of Ghana. In 2012 the constituency was split into the Atwima Nwabiagya South and the Atwima Nwabiagya North constituencies.

== Boundaries ==
The seat is located within the Atwima District of the Ashanti Region of Ghana.

== Members of Parliament ==
Election	Member	Party
1992	Yaw Bampoh	National Democratic Congress
1996	James Edusei Sarkodie	New Patriotic Party
2004	Benito Owusu-Bio	New Patriotic Party
2012	Anthony Osei Boakye	New Patriotic Party

== Elections ==
2008 Ghanaian parliamentary election: Atwima-Nwabiagya Source: Ghana Home Page
Party	Candidate	Votes	%	±%
New Patriotic Party	Benito Owusu-Bio	46,605	63.9	—
Independent	Yaw Frimpong	13,912	19.1	—
National Democratic Congress	Chogkureh Christopher	12,466	17.1	—
Majority		32,693	44.8	—
Turnout				

== See also ==
- List of Ghana Parliament constituencies
