= Demographics of Ghana =

- Population pyramid of Ghana 1950-2026
- Population: 33,107,275 (2022 est.)
- Growth rate: 2.23% (2022 est.)
- Birth rate: 28.55 births/1,000 population (2022 est.)
- Death rate: 6.14 deaths/1,000 population (2022 est.)
- Life expectancy: 69.37 years
  - male: 67.7 years
  - female: 71.09 years
- Fertility rate: 3.66 children born/woman (2022 est.)
- Infant mortality: 32.59 deaths/1,000 live births
- Net migration rate: -0.16 migrant(s)/1,000 population (2022 est.)
- Immigrant share: 1.5% (2024)

Age structure
- 0–14 years: 37.44%
- 65 and over: 4.44%

Sex ratio
- Total: 0.95 male(s)/female (2022 est.)
- At birth: 1.03 male(s)/female
- Under 15: 1.02 male(s)/female
- 65 and over: 0.72 male(s)/female

Nationality
- Nationality: Ghanaian
- Major ethnic: Akan (45.7%)

Language
- Official: English

Demographic features of the population of Ghana include population density, ethnicity, education level, health of the populace, religious affiliations, and other aspects.

Ghana's population is 30,832,019 (2021 census).

== Population ==
Ghana's Population in Census Years
Year	Total recorded population
Pre-independence
1891	764,613
1901	1,549,661
1911	1,503,911
1921	2,296,400
1931	3,160,386
1948	4,118,459
Post-independence
1960	6,726,815
1970	8,559,313
1984	12,296,081
2000	18,912,079
2010	24,658,823
2021	30,832,019

=== Population distribution ===
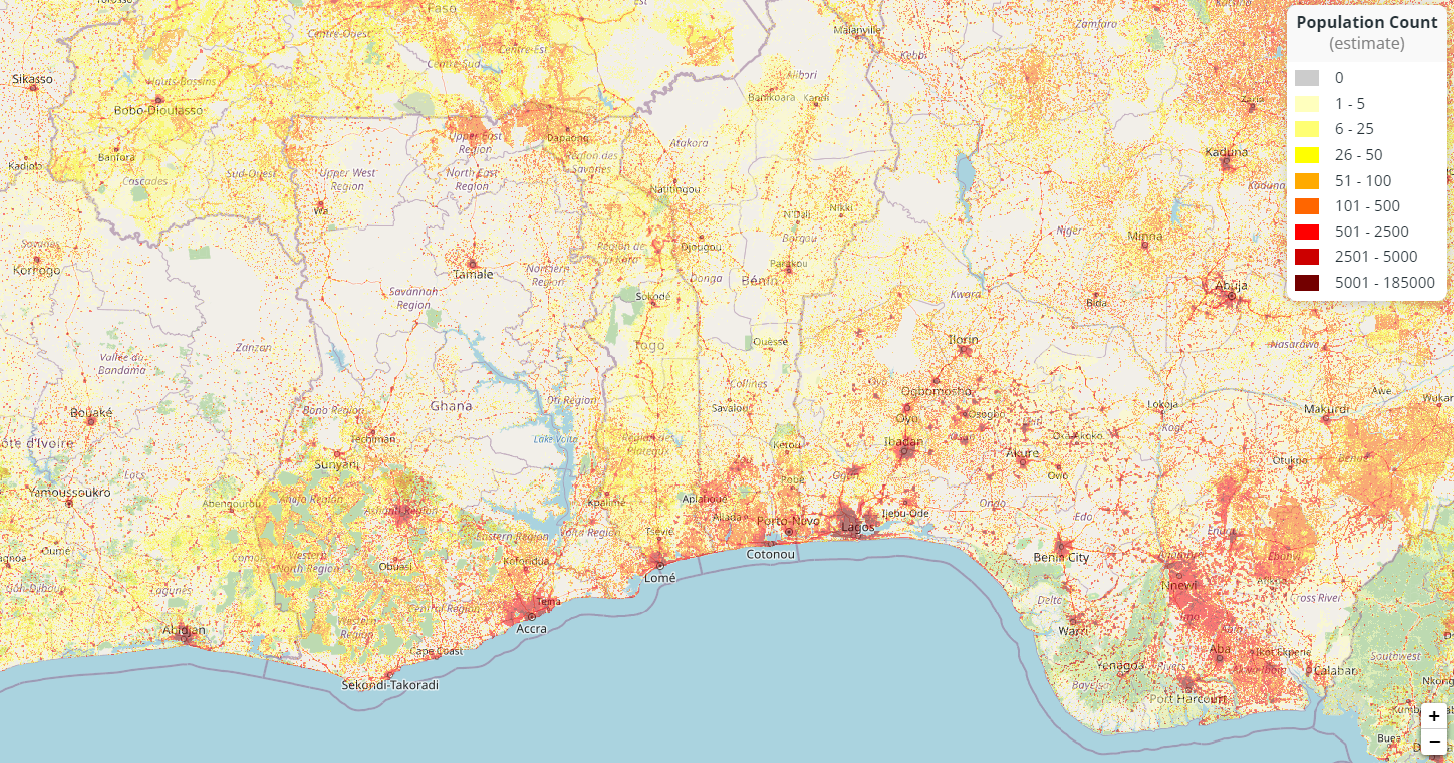
Population density in Western Africa

Population density increased steadily from 36 per square kilometer in 1970 to 52 per square kilometer in 1984. In 1990 63 persons per square kilometer was the estimate for Ghana's overall population density. These averages did not reflect variations in population distribution. For example, while the Northern Region, one of ten administrative regions, showed a density of 17 persons per square kilometer in 1984, in the same year Greater Accra Region recorded nine times the national average of 52 per square kilometers.

As was the case in the 1960 and 1970 figures, the greatest concentration of population in 1984 was to the south of the Kwahu Plateau. The highest concentration of habitation continued to be within the Accra-Kumasi-Takoradi triangle, largely because of the economic productivity of the region. All of Ghana's mining centres, timber-producing deciduous forests, and cocoa-growing lands lie to the south of the Kwahu Plateau. The Accra-Kumasi-Takoradi triangle is linked to the coast by rail and road systems—making this area a magnet for investsment and labor.

A part of the Volta Basin is more sparsely populated. The far north is more heavily populated. The population density of the Upper East Region is above the national average. This may be explained in part by the better soil found in some areas.

=== Urban–rural disparities ===
Localities of 5,000 persons and above have been classified as urban since 1960. The 1960 urban population totalled 1,551,174 persons, or 23.1% of total population. By 1970, the urban percentage had increased to 28%. That percentage rose to 32% in 1984 and was estimated at 33% for 1992.

Urban areas in Ghana have customarily been supplied with more amenities than rural locations. Consequently, Kumasi, Accra, and other settlements within the southern economic belt attracted more people than the savanna regions of the north; only Tamale in the north has been an exception. The linkage of the national electricity grid to the northern areas of the country in the 1980s may help to stabilize the north-to-south flow of internal migration.

Ghana has continued to be a nation of rural communities. Rural residency was estimated to be 67% of the population in 1992. In the 1970s, 72% of Ghana's population lived in rural areas. The "Rural Manifesto," which assessed the causes of rural underdevelopment, was introduced in April 1984. Development strategies were evaluated, and some were implemented to make rural residency more attractive. The Bank of Ghana established more than 120 rural banks to support rural entrepreneurs, and the rural electrification program was intensified in the 1980s. The government presented its plans for district assemblies as a component of its strategy for rural improvement through decentralized administration.

=== Demographic trends ===
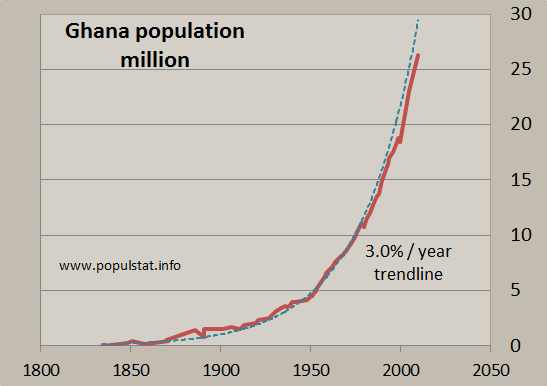

Ghana's first post independence population census in 1961 counted about 6.7 million inhabitants. Between 1965 and 1989, a constant 45% of Ghana total female population was of childbearing age.

=== Age structure ===
Population by Sex and Age Group (Census 26.IX.2010):

Age group	Male	Female	Total	%
Total	12,024,845	12,633 978	24 658 823	100
0–4	1 731 787	1 673 619	3 405 406	13.81
5–9	1 589 632	1 539 320	3 128 952	12.69
10–14	1 477 525	1 438 515	2 916 040	11.83
15–19	1 311 112	1 298 877	2 609 989	10.58
20–24	1 100 727	1 222 764	2 323 491	9.42
25–29	943 213	1 106 898	2 050 111	8.31
30–34	790 301	888 508	1 678 809	6.81
35–39	676 768	744 635	1 421 403	5.76
40–44	572 620	613 730	1 186 350	4.81
45–49	452 975	485 123	938 098	3.80
50–54	394 600	438 498	833 098	3.38
55–59	258 582	265 113	523 695	2.12
60–64	227 050	248 799	475 849	1.93
65–69	136 244	157 627	293 871	1.19
70–74	149 512	201 818	351 330	1.42
75–79	89 149	116 804	205 953	0.84
80–84	62 357	96 727	159 084	0.65
85–89	32 937	50 133	83 070	0.34
90–94	19 004	32 077	51 081	0.21
95+	8 750	14 393	23 143	0.09
Age group	Male	Female	Total	Percent
0–14	4 798 944	4 651 454	9 450 398	38.32
15–64	6 727 948	7 312 945	14 040 893	56.94
65+	497 953	669 579	1 167 532	4.73

Population Estimates by Sex and Age Group (01.VII.2015) (Data based on the 2010 Population Census.):

Age group	Male	Female	Total	%
Total	13 562 093	14 108 081	27 670 174	100
0–4	2 020 776	1 978 634	3 999 410	14.45
5–9	1 688 452	1 624 426	3 312 878	11.97
10–14	1 567 043	1 530 309	3 097 352	11.19
15–19	1 414 987	1 410 591	2 825 578	10.21
20–24	1 251 759	1 286 040	2 537 799	9.17
25–29	1 083 877	1 168 616	2 252 493	8.14
30–34	935 947	1 031 219	1 967 166	7.11
35–39	785 200	880 037	1 665 237	6.02
40–44	661 789	742 520	1 404 309	5.08
45–49	546 030	599 902	1 145 932	4.14
50–54	445 531	487 737	933 268	3.37
55–59	348 118	379 884	728 002	2.63
60–64	270 642	299 974	570 616	2.06
65–69	196 219	223 282	419 501	1.52
70–74	142 378	170 878	313 256	1.13
75–79	96 514	126 573	223 087	0.81
80+	106 831	167 459	274 290	0.99
Age group	Male	Female	Total	Percent
0–14	5 276 271	5 133 369	10 409 640	37.62
15–64	7 743 880	8 286 520	16 030 400	57.93
65+	541 942	688 192	1 230 134	4.45

=== United Nations statistics ===
In July 2022, the United Nations published its 2022 World Population Prospects, a biennially updated database where key demographic indicators are estimated and projected worldwide down to the country level. They prepared the following estimates of demographic indicators in Ghana for every year from 1950 to 2021, as well as projections for future decades.

	Mid-year population	Live births	Deaths	Natural change	Crude birth rate (per 1000)	Crude death rate (per 1000)	Natural change (per 1000)	Total fertility rate (TFR)	Infant mortality (per 1000 live births)	Life expectancy (in years)
1950	5,078,000	237,000	114,000	123,000	46.8	22.6	24.2	6.59	149.2	43.11
1951	5,220,000	250,000	116,000	135,000	48.0	22.2	25.8	6.64	145.5	43.65
1952	5,373,000	263,000	117,000	145,000	49.0	21.9	27.1	6.68	142.2	44.07
1953	5,535,000	276,000	119,000	157,000	49.8	21.5	28.3	6.73	139.0	44.59
1954	5,706,000	287,000	121,000	167,000	50.3	21.1	29.2	6.75	136.1	45.08
1955	5,887,000	298,000	122,000	176,000	50.7	20.8	29.9	6.77	133.2	45.50
1956	6,077,000	309,000	124,000	185,000	50.9	20.4	30.5	6.80	130.6	45.90
1957	6,276,000	319,000	126,000	193,000	50.8	20.0	30.8	6.81	128.3	46.26
1958	6,479,000	328,000	128,000	201,000	50.7	19.7	31.0	6.82	126.2	46.50
1959	6,690,000	337,000	129,000	207,000	50.4	19.3	31.0	6.83	124.6	46.87
1960	6,912,000	344,000	131,000	213,000	49.8	19.0	30.8	6.85	123.1	47.10
1961	7,109,000	352,000	133,000	219,000	49.3	18.7	30.7	6.89	122.0	47.33
1962	7,281,000	359,000	137,000	222,000	49.2	18.7	30.4	6.95	121.2	47.41
1963	7,458,000	367,000	140,000	226,000	49.0	18.7	30.3	6.98	120.6	47.58
1964	7,640,000	371,000	143,000	228,000	48.4	18.7	29.7	6.93	120.1	47.72
1965	7,828,000	376,000	146,000	230,000	47.9	18.6	29.3	6.89	120.0	47.78
1966	8,020,000	381,000	150,000	231,000	47.4	18.6	28.7	6.88	120.0	47.73
1967	8,216,000	389,000	153,000	236,000	47.2	18.6	28.6	6.91	120.2	47.68
1968	8,418,000	398,000	157,000	241,000	47.2	18.7	28.5	6.91	120.3	47.57
1969	8,630,000	409,000	161,000	248,000	47.3	18.6	28.7	6.96	120.3	47.57
1970	8,862,000	418,000	163,000	255,000	47.2	18.4	28.8	6.95	120.1	47.81
1971	9,109,000	428,000	166,000	261,000	46.9	18.3	28.7	6.94	119.7	47.80
1972	9,366,000	436,000	166,000	270,000	46.5	17.8	28.8	6.91	118.4	48.03
1973	9,637,000	446,000	167,000	279,000	46.2	17.3	28.9	6.87	116.7	48.40
1974	9,919,000	455,000	168,000	287,000	45.8	16.9	29.0	6.83	114.5	48.78
1975	10,210,000	464,000	168,000	296,000	45.4	16.4	29.0	6.77	112.0	49.25
1976	10,509,000	473,000	168,000	305,000	45.0	15.9	29.0	6.72	109.1	49.76
1977	10,825,000	484,000	169,000	315,000	44.7	15.6	29.1	6.68	106.6	50.09
1978	11,163,000	498,000	171,000	327,000	44.7	15.3	29.3	6.61	104.4	50.57
1979	11,516,000	514,000	175,000	339,000	44.7	15.2	29.5	6.56	102.8	50.93
1980	11,865,000	532,000	179,000	353,000	44.8	15.1	29.7	6.52	101.6	51.12
1981	12,213,000	549,000	181,000	368,000	45.0	14.8	30.1	6.47	100.8	51.27
1982	12,585,000	563,000	183,000	380,000	44.8	14.6	30.2	6.38	100.2	51.38
1983	12,984,000	582,000	187,000	395,000	44.8	14.4	30.4	6.31	98.9	51.62
1984	13,342,000	602,000	190,000	412,000	44.9	14.2	30.8	6.24	97.1	52.05
1985	13,651,000	608,000	189,000	418,000	44.3	13.8	30.5	6.19	94.9	52.42
1986	13,972,000	613,000	186,000	427,000	43.8	13.3	30.5	6.15	92.2	53.13
1987	14,311,000	618,000	184,000	434,000	43.0	12.8	30.2	6.09	89.1	53.82
1988	14,672,000	618,000	181,000	437,000	42.0	12.3	29.7	5.96	85.8	54.51
1989	15,052,000	620,000	178,000	441,000	41.1	11.8	29.3	5.83	82.7	55.19
1990	15,447,000	625,000	178,000	447,000	40.4	11.5	28.9	5.71	79.8	55.62
1991	15,843,000	629,000	178,000	451,000	39.6	11.2	28.4	5.59	77.6	56.01
1992	16,242,000	630,000	179,000	451,000	38.7	11.0	27.7	5.47	75.7	56.23
1993	16,644,000	632,000	181,000	451,000	37.9	10.9	27.0	5.36	74.3	56.42
1994	17,041,000	627,000	187,000	441,000	36.8	10.9	25.8	5.19	73.7	56.11
1995	17,439,000	632,000	186,000	445,000	36.2	10.7	25.5	5.07	72.6	56.57
1996	17,844,000	633,000	188,000	445,000	35.4	10.5	24.9	4.93	71.4	56.82
1997	18,268,000	644,000	189,000	456,000	35.3	10.3	24.9	4.87	70.2	57.20
1998	18,715,000	660,000	190,000	471,000	35.3	10.1	25.1	4.84	68.6	57.60
1999	19,177,000	680,000	191,000	489,000	35.4	10.0	25.5	4.84	66.6	58.03
2000	19,666,000	706,000	195,000	510,000	35.9	9.9	25.9	4.85	64.3	58.20
2001	20,196,000	719,000	201,000	518,000	35.6	10.0	25.7	4.79	62.1	58.11
2002	20,758,000	733,000	202,000	531,000	35.3	9.7	25.6	4.72	59.9	58.61
2003	21,330,000	745,000	203,000	542,000	34.9	9.5	25.4	4.63	58.0	59.11
2004	21,906,000	756,000	207,000	549,000	34.5	9.5	25.1	4.53	56.3	59.19
2005	22,497,000	785,000	208,000	577,000	34.9	9.2	25.6	4.54	54.9	59.76
2006	23,099,000	788,000	211,000	577,000	34.1	9.1	25.0	4.41	53.5	59.99
2007	23,708,000	795,000	214,000	581,000	33.6	9.0	24.5	4.31	52.0	60.22
2008	24,326,000	807,000	217,000	591,000	33.2	8.9	24.3	4.25	50.5	60.49
2009	24,951,000	823,000	217,000	606,000	33.0	8.7	24.3	4.21	48.8	60.95
2010	25,575,000	844,000	221,000	624,000	33.0	8.6	24.4	4.21	47.0	61.16
2011	26,206,000	864,000	221,000	643,000	33.0	8.4	24.5	4.19	45.2	61.65
2012	26,859,000	883,000	221,000	662,000	32.9	8.2	24.6	4.18	43.4	62.08
2013	27,526,000	896,000	223,000	673,000	32.5	8.1	24.4	4.14	41.7	62.42
2014	28,196,000	898,000	220,000	677,000	31.8	7.8	24.0	4.05	40.2	63.05
2015	28,871,000	916,000	225,000	691,000	31.7	7.8	23.9	4.05	38.7	63.18
2016	29,554,000	902,000	220,000	682,000	30.5	7.5	23.1	3.91	37.4	63.89
2017	30,222,000	876,000	223,000	652,000	29.0	7.4	21.6	3.71	36.2	64.01
2018	30,871,000	897,000	228,000	669,000	29.0	7.4	21.7	3.73	35.1	64.12
2019	31,259,000	872,000	229,000	642,000	27.9	7.3	20.6	3.59	34.5	64.5
2020	31,888,000	875,000	237,000	637,000	27.4	7.4	20.0	3.54	33.5	64.3
2021	32,519,000	879,000	243,000	636,000	27.0	7.5	19.6	3.49	32.5	64.3
2022	33,149,000	882,000	235,000	646,000	26.6	7.1	19.5	3.43	31.6	65.2
2023	33,788,000	889,000	238,000	651,000	26.3	7.0	19.3	3.40	30.7	65.5

View source data.
View source data.
View source data.
View source data.

=== Demographics and Health Surveys ===
Total Fertility Rate (TFR) (Wanted Fertility Rate) and Crude Birth Rate (CBR) Demographics Health Survey:

Year	Total		Urban		Rural	
Year	CBR	TFR (WFR)	CBR	TFR (WFR)	CBR	TFR (WFR)
1993	38.0	5.5 (4.2)	32.9	3.99 (2.9)	40.2	6.36 (4.9)
1998	32.7	4.55 (3.7)	25.4	2.96 (2.4)	36.0	5.41 (4.3)
2003	32.6	4.4 (3.7)	26.6	3.1 (2.6)	36.7	5.6 (4.6)
2007	33.3	4.6	28.4	3.4	36.3	5.5
2008	30.8	4.0 (3.5)	27.1	3.1 (2.7)	33.6	4.9 (4.2)
2014	30.6	4.2 (3.6)	27.9	3.4 (3.1)	33.5	5.2 (4.3)
2017	30.0	3.9	28.3	3.3	31.7	4.7
2022	27.9	3.9 (3.4)	25.1	3.2 (2.8)	30.9	4.8 (4.2)

Years	1925	1926	1927	1928	1929
Total Fertility Rate in Ghana	6.43	6.43	6.42	6.42	6.42

Years	1930	1931	1932	1933	1934	1935	1936	1937	1938	1939
Total Fertility Rate in Ghana	6.42	6.41	6.41	6.41	6.41	6.40	6.40	6.40	6.40	6.39

Years	1940	1941	1942	1943	1944	1945	1946	1947	1948	1949
Total Fertility Rate in Ghana	6.39	6.39	6.39	6.38	6.38	6.38	6.38	6.37	6.37	6.37

=== Fertility and births (Census 2000 and 2010) ===
Total Fertility Rate (TFR) and Crude Birth Rate (CBR):
Year	Total		Urban		Rural	
Year	CBR	TFR	CBR	TFR	CBR	TFR
2000	31.1	3.99	26.7	3.0	33.8	4.9
2010	25.3	3.28	23.0	2.78	26.9	3.94

Births and deaths
Year	Population	Live births	Deaths	Natural increase	Crude birth rate	Crude death rate	Rate of natural increase	TFR
2010	24,200,000	623,700	163,534	460,166	25.3	6.6	18.7	3.28

Fertility data as of 2014 (DHS Program):
Region	Total fertility rate	Percentage of women aged 15–49 currently pregnant	Mean number of children ever born to women aged 40–49
Western	3.6	6.9	4.8
Central	4.7	7.8	5.2
Greater Accra	2.8	6.9	3.4
Volta	4.3	6.1	4.8
Eastern	4.2	7.9	4.9
Ashanti	4.2	5.8	4.8
Brong Ahafo	4.8	7.6	5.1
Northern	6.6	8.9	6.4
Upper East	4.9	7.9	5.7
Upper West	5.2	6.8	6.4

Fertility and wanted fertility data as of 2014 and 2022 (DHS Program):
Region	Total fertility rate (Wanted fertility rate) 2014	Total fertility rate (Wanted fertility rate) 2022
Western	3.6 (3.3)	3.6 (3.0)
Central	4.7 (3.8)	3.6 (2.8)
Greater Accra	2.8 (2.5)	2.9 (2.6)
Volta	4.3 (3.6)	3.2 (2.7)
Eastern	4.2 (3.4)	3.5 (3.0)
Ashanti	4.2 (3.5)	3.5 (3.0)
Western North		3.8 (3.3)
Brong Ahafo	4.8 (3.9)	4.3 (3.7)
Bono		3.7 (3.4)
Bono East		4.7 (4.3)
Oti		5.2 (4.6)
Northern	6.6 (6.2)	5.6 (5.1)
Savannah		5.8 (5.4)
North East		6.6 (6.5)
Upper East	4.9 (4.5)	4.6 (4.5)
Upper West	5.2 (4.5)	4.5 (4.2)

== Ethnic groups ==
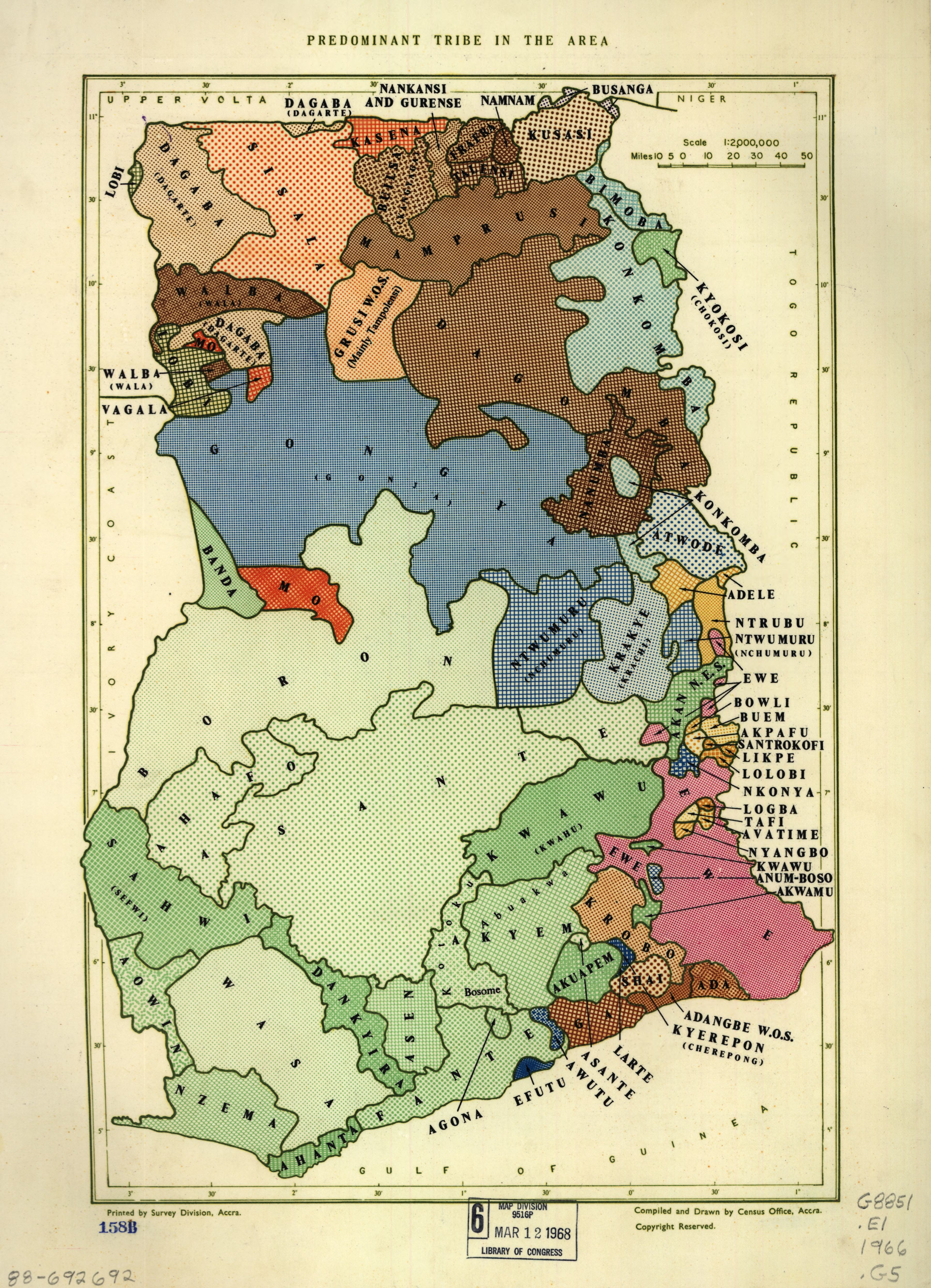
A map of Ghana's ethno-linguistic areas.

Ghana has more than 70 native ethnic groups.

More than 10,000 Lebanese people live in Ghana.

== Languages ==
Ghana is a multilingual country in which about 80 languages are spoken. English is the official language and lingua franca. Of the languages indigenous to Ghana, Akan is the most widely spoken.

Ghana has more than seventy ethnic groups, each with its own distinct language. Languages that belong to the same ethnic group are usually mutually intelligible.

Eleven languages have the status of government-sponsored languages: four Akan ethnic languages (Akuapem Twi, Asante Twi, Fante and Nzema) and two Mole–Dagbani ethnic languages (Dagaare and Dagbanli). The rest are Ewe, Dangme, Ga, Gonja, and Kasem, Hausa.

== Religion ==
Christian: 71.3% (Pentecostal/Charismatic 31.6%, Protestant 17.4%, Catholic 10%, other 12.3%), Muslim 19.9%, traditionalist 3.2%, 2.1% Hindu, other 1.3%, none 1.1% (2021 census)

== See also ==
- List of hospitals in the Atwima Nwabiagya District
