= Emmanuel Adjei Anhwere =

Ghanaian politician

Hon. Emmanuel Adjei Anhwere
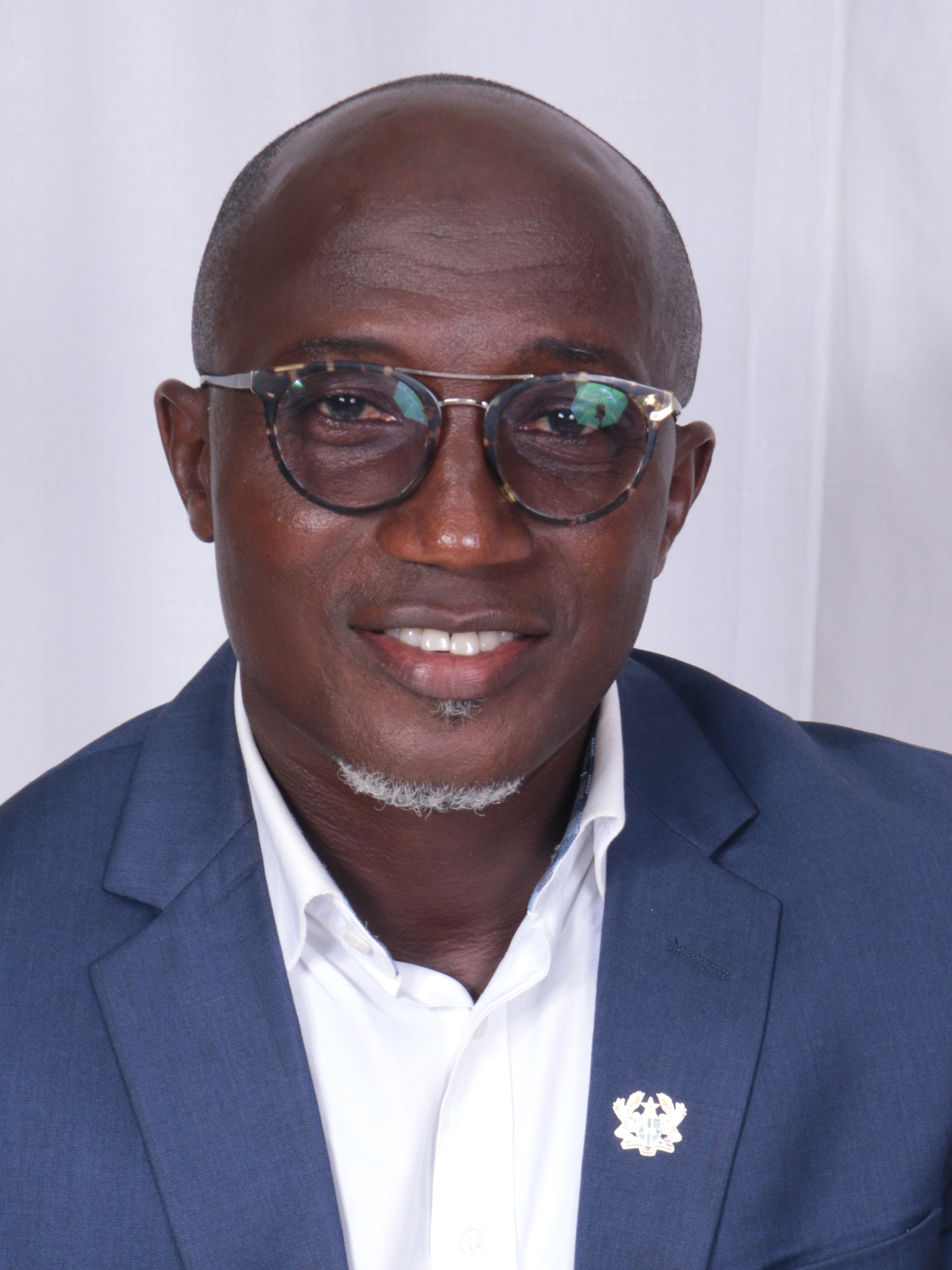
- In office 7 January 2017 – 6 January 2025
- President: Nana Akufo-Addo
- Succeeded by: Shirley Kyei

Member of the Ghana Parliament for Atwima-Nwabiagya South

Personal details
- Born: 20 September 1962 (age 63) Asante Mampong
- Party: New Patriotic Party
- Children: Five
- Education: Kwame Nkrumah University of Science and Technology, University of Education Winneba
- Profession: Senior Quality Control Officer
- Committees: Food, Agriculture and Cocoa Affairs Committee - Vice chairperson, Privileges Committee

Emmanuel Adjei Anhwere, (MP) (September 20, 1962) is a Ghanaian politician and the member of parliament in the Seventh Parliament of the Fourth Republic of Ghana and the eighth Parliament of Ghana. He represented the people of Atwima-Nwabiagya South constituency of the Ashanti region of Ghana.

== Early life and education ==
Anhwere was born on 20 September 1962 and hails from Asante Mampong in the Ashanti Region of Ghana. He obtained BBA from the University of Education Winneba, in 2010. He proceeded to Kwame Nkrumah University of Science and Technology where he obtained CEMBA (Public administration ) in 2015.

== Career and politics ==
In 2016, Anhwere stood on the ticket of the New Patriotic Party to be elected as the Member of Parliament in the seventh parliament of the Fourth Republic. He won with 48,264 votes out the 58,313 valid votes cast, which represent 83.15% whilst his main opponent on the ticket of the National Democratic Party (NDC) Nana Asare Bediako, obtained 9,780, representing 16,85%. He retained his seat in the 2020 General election to represent his constituents in eighth Parliament of the Fourth Republic. Until his election in 2016, he was the Senior Quality Control Officer of COCOBOD branch in Kumasi.

== Personal life ==
Emmanuel is a married man with five children. He is a Christian and worship with the Anglican church.
