= Ntobroso =

Village in Ashanti region of Ghana

- Interactive map of Ntobroso
- Coordinates: 6°32′06″N 2°02′42″W
- Country: Ghana
- Region: Ashanti region

Ntobroso is a community in the Atwima Mponua district in Ashanti region of Ghana.
