= Tano Dumasi =

Tano Dumasi is a town in Atwima Mponua District, Ashanti Region, Ghana. It is located at an elevation of 299 meters above sea level and its population amounts to 114,989.

Tano Odumase is also known as Odumase, Odumasi, Tano Odumase.

== Notable sons ==
- Isaac Kwame Asiamah - Ghanaian politician
