= Military hospital =

Armed forces' medical facility

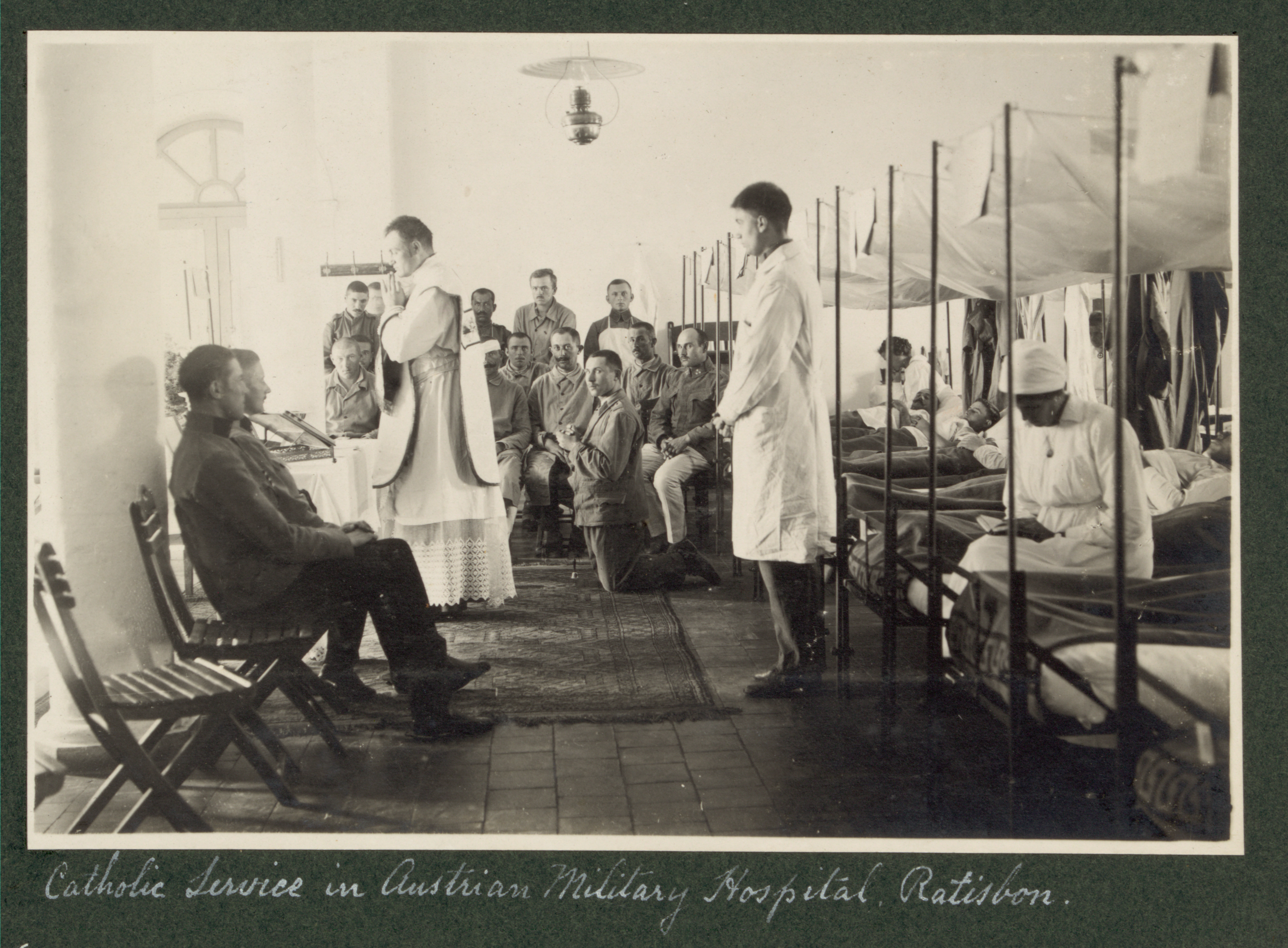
Catholic service in Austrian military hospital during World War I.

A military hospital is a hospital owned or operated by a military. They are often reserved for the use of military personnel and their dependents, but in some countries are made available to civilians as well. They may or may not be located on a military base; many are not.

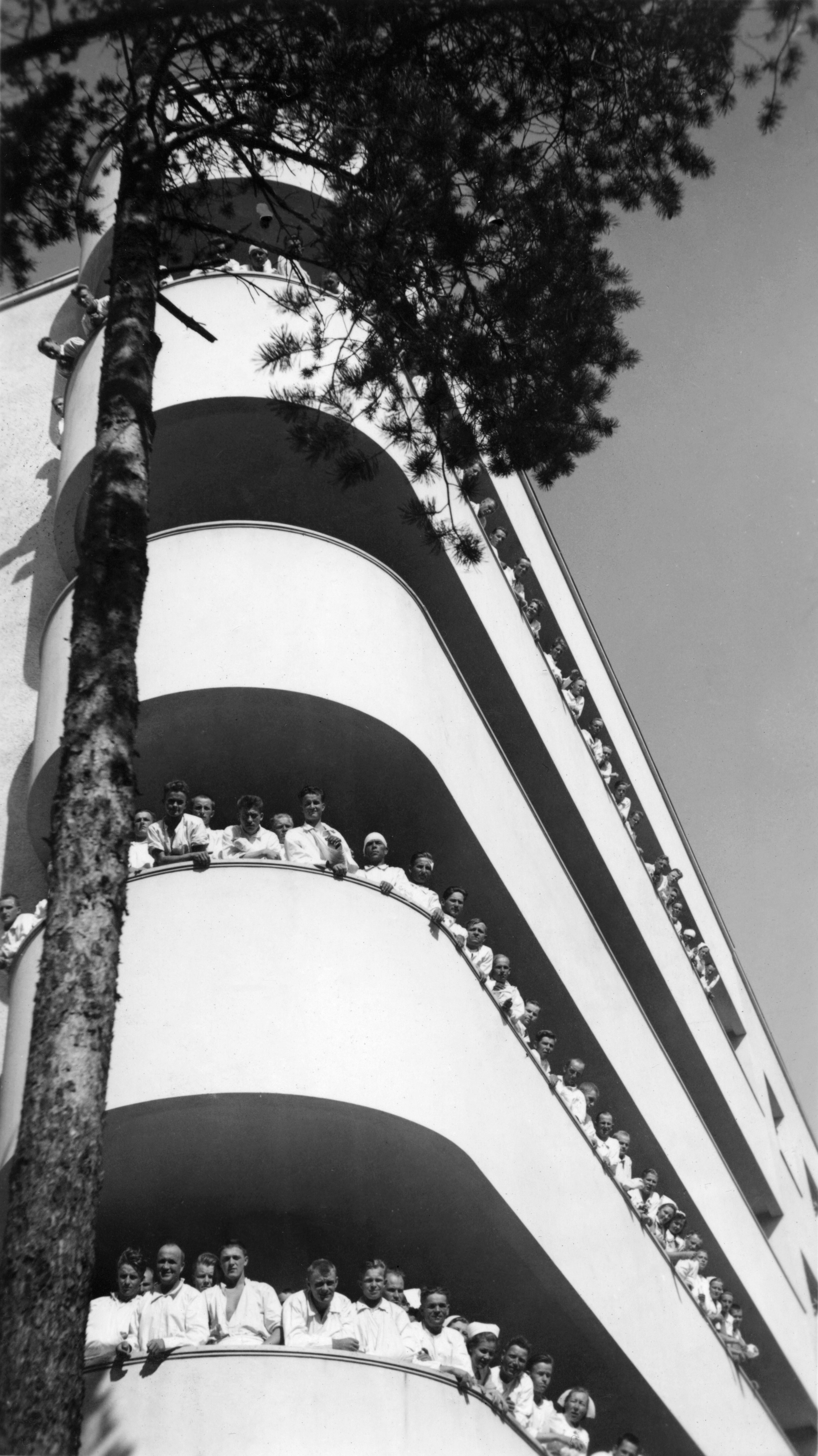
A former military hospital in Tampere, Finland in 1940.

In the United Kingdom and Germany, British military hospitals have been closed; military personnel are usually treated in a special wing of a designated civilian hospital, in the UK, these are referred to as a Ministry of Defence Hospital Unit. Service personnel injured in combat operations are normally treated at the Royal Centre for Defence Medicine.

== Examples ==
=== Asia ===
==== Azerbaijan ====
- Central Clinical Hospital
- Baku Military Garrison Hospital
- Military Hospital of Frontiers
- Central Customs Hospital
- Hospital of the Ministry of Internal Affairs
- Central Military Hospital
- Military Hospital of the Ministry of National Security
- Polyclinic of the Army Medical Department of the Ministry of National Security

==== Bangladesh ====
- Combined Military Hospital (Dhaka) (CMH)

==== China ====
- Nanjing General Hospital of People's Liberation Army
- 301st General Hospital of the Chinese PLA
- 307th General Hospital of the Chinese PLA

==== Indonesia ====
- Gatot Soebroto Army Hospital, Jakarta

==== Jordan ====
- King Hussein Medical City, Amman - Jordan

==== Mongolia ====
- Central Military Hospital, Ulanabaatar

==== Taiwan ====
- Tri-Service General Hospital, Taipei
- Kaohsiung Armed Forces General Hospital, Kaohsiung

=== Africa ===
==== Kenya ====
- Gilgil Regional Military Hospital

==== Ghana ====
- 37 Military Hospital
- Kumasi Military Hospital

==== Egypt ====
- International Medical Center, El Shorouk

=== Europe ===
==== Other European hospitals ====
- Military Medical Academy, Belgrade
- St Bricin's Military Hospital, Dublin
- Heeresspital (HSP), Vienna

=== Americas ===
- Belize Hospital
- Brooke Army Medical Center, U.S.
- Carlos J. Finlay Military Hospital, Cuba
- Central Hospital of the Armed Forces, Uruguay
- Hospital Militar Central, Argentina
- Hospital Militar Central, Peru
- Tripler Army Medical Center, U.S.
- Walter Reed National Military Medical Center, U.S.

== Gallery ==
Pictures of Israeli military hospital in 1948.

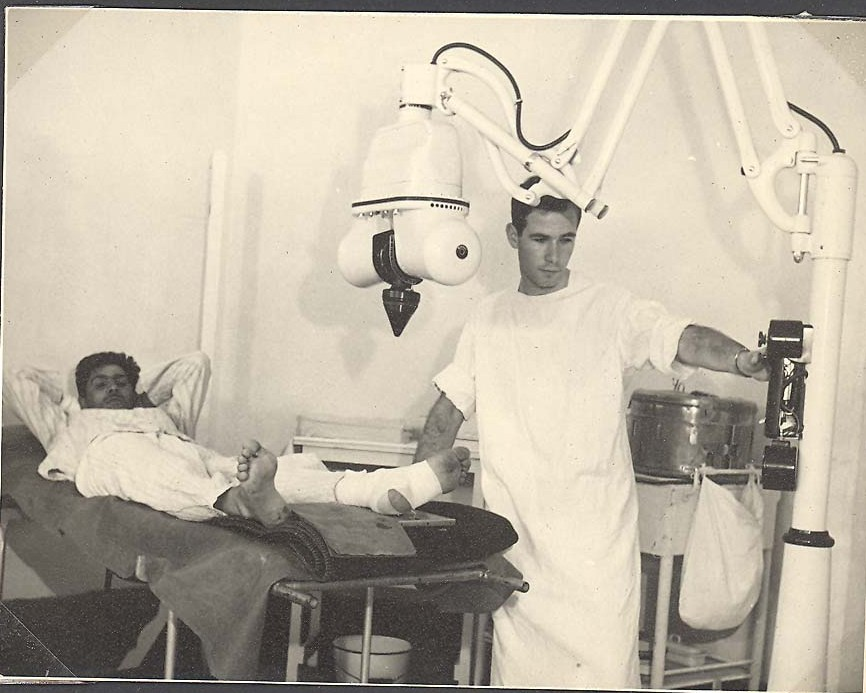

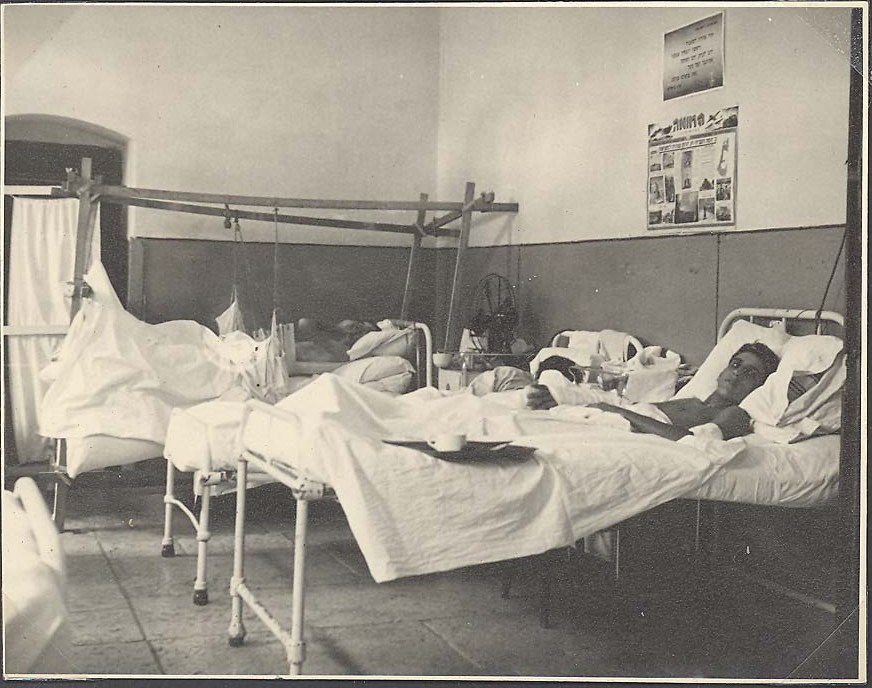

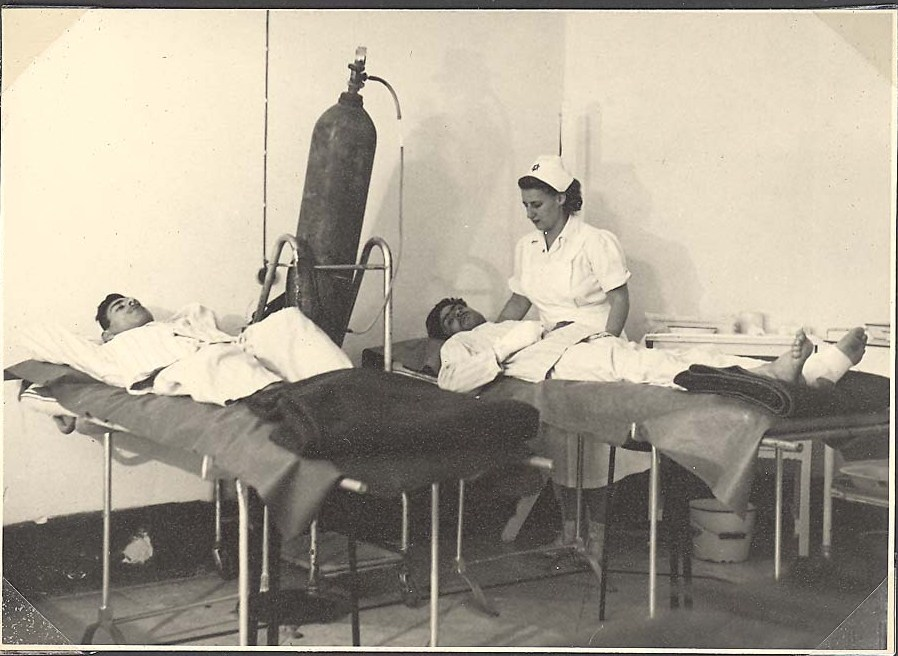

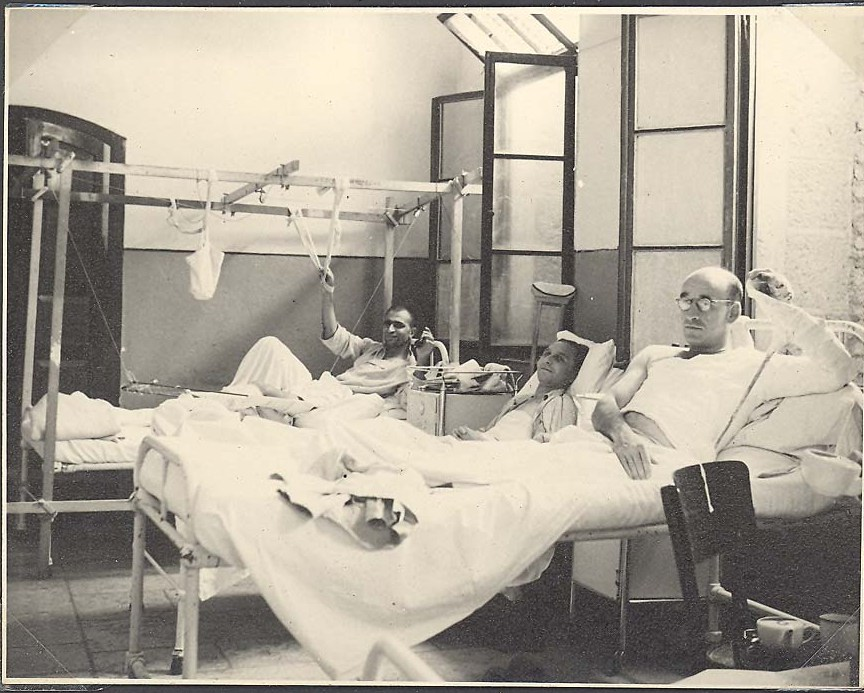

== See also ==
- Military Health System
- Royal Naval Hospital
