= Benito Owusu Bio =

Ghanaian politician (born 1968)

Hon. Benito Owusu Bio
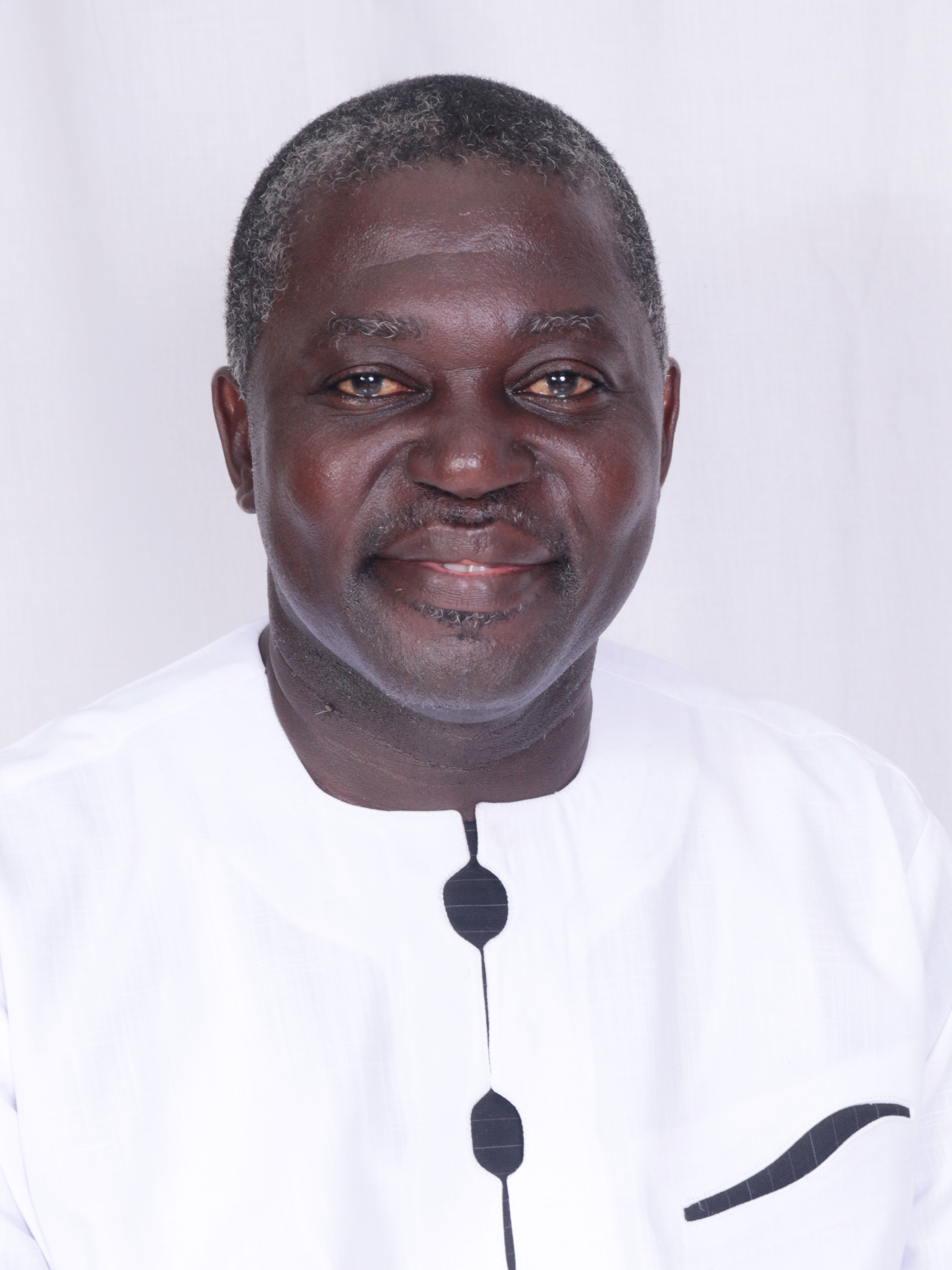

Deputy Minister of Lands and Natural Resources
- Incumbent
- Assumed office 7 January 2017
- President: Nana Akufo-Addo

Member of the Ghana Parliament for Atwima-Nwabiagya North
- Incumbent
- Assumed office 7 January 2005

Personal details
- Born: 1 November 1968 (age 58) Akropong, Ashanti Region
- Party: New Patriotic Party
- Education: Kwame Nkrumah University of Science and Technology, University of Birmingham
- Profession: Land Economist, Hotelier
- Committees: Roads and Transport Committee, Public Accounts Committee (7th Parliament of 4th Republic of Ghana)

Benito Owusu Bio (born November 1, 1968) is a land economist and Ghanaian politician of the Republic of Ghana. He is the Member of Parliament representing Atwima-Nwabiagya constituency of the Ashanti Region of Ghana in the 4th,5th,6th, 7th and the 8th Parliament of the 4th Republic of Ghana. He is a member of the New Patriotic Party.

== Early life and education ==
Owusu was born on November 1, 1968. He hails from Akropong, a town in the Ashanti Region of Ghana. He is a product of the Kwame Nkrumah University of Science and Technology. He holds a Bachelor of Science degree in Land Economy from the university. He acquired the degree in 1994. He is also a product of University of Birmingham. He holds a Masters in Sociology in Hospitality. He obtained the certificate in 1998.

== Career ==
Owusu was a general manager at the Hotel Georgia Limited in Kumasi.

== Political career ==
Owusu is a member of the New Patriotic Party. He became a member of parliament from January 2005 after emerging winner in the General Election in December 2004. He has since then had a run of four consecutive terms in office. He is the MP for Atwima-Nwabiagya North constituency. He has been elected as the member of parliament for this constituency in the fourth, fifth, sixth and seventh parliament of the fourth Republic of Ghana. He was a member of the Roads and Transport Committee and the Public Accounts Committee in the 7th Parliament of the 4th Republic of Ghana. While in parliament, he was appointed as the Deputy Minister of Lands and Natural Resources.

== Elections ==
Owusu-Bio was elected as the member of parliament for the Atwima-Nwabiagya North constituency of the Ashanti Region of Ghana for the first time in the 2004 Ghanaian general elections. He won on the ticket of the New Patriotic Party. His constituency was a part of the 36 parliamentary seats out of 39 seats won by the New Patriotic Party in that election for the Ashanti Region. The New Patriotic Party won a majority total of 128 parliamentary seats out of 230 seats. He was elected with 56,337 votes out of 70,252 total valid votes cast equivalent to 80.2% of total valid votes cast. He was elected over Ebenezer Obu Tetteh of the Peoples’ National Convention, Nana Appia Manu of the National Democratic Congress, Munni Issah of the Convention People's Party and Ben Owusu Boadu of the Every Ghanaian Living Everywhere political party. These obtained 1.0% 17.1%, 1.5% and 0.3% respectively of total valid votes cast.

In 2008, he won the general elections on the ticket of the New Patriotic Party for the same constituency. His constituency was part of the 34 parliamentary seats out of 39 seats won by the New Patriotic Party in that election for the Ashanti Region. The New Patriotic Party won a minority total of 109 parliamentary seats out of 230 seats. He was elected with 46,605 votes out of 72,973 total valid votes cast equivalent to 63.87% of total valid votes cast. He was elected over Chogkureh Christopher of the National Democratic Congress and Yaw Frimpong and independent party. These obtained 17.07% and 19.06% respectively of the total votes cast.

In 2012, he won the general elections on the ticket of the New Patriotic Party for the same constituency. He was elected with 27,456 votes out of 45,849 total valid votes cast equivalent to 59.88% of total valid votes cast. He was elected over Anthony Bernard Ansah of the National Democratic Congress, Kwadwo Amponsah of the Progressive People's Party and Dickson Osei-Asibey an independent candidate. 12,13 These obtained 18.2%, 0.84% and 21.08% respectively of the total votes cast. Benito was re-elected in 2016 and 2020 general election to represent in the 7th and 8th Parliament of the Fourth Republic respectively.

== Personal life ==
Owusu-Bio is a Christian and a member of the Anglican church. He is married with three children.

== See also ==
- List of MPs elected in the 2004 Ghanaian parliamentary election
- List of MPs elected in the 2008 Ghanaian parliamentary election
- List of MPs elected in the 2012 Ghanaian parliamentary election
- List of MPs elected in the 2016 Ghanaian parliamentary election
