= Isaac Kwame Asiamah =

Ghanaian politician (born 1975)

Hon. Isaac Kwame Asiamah MP
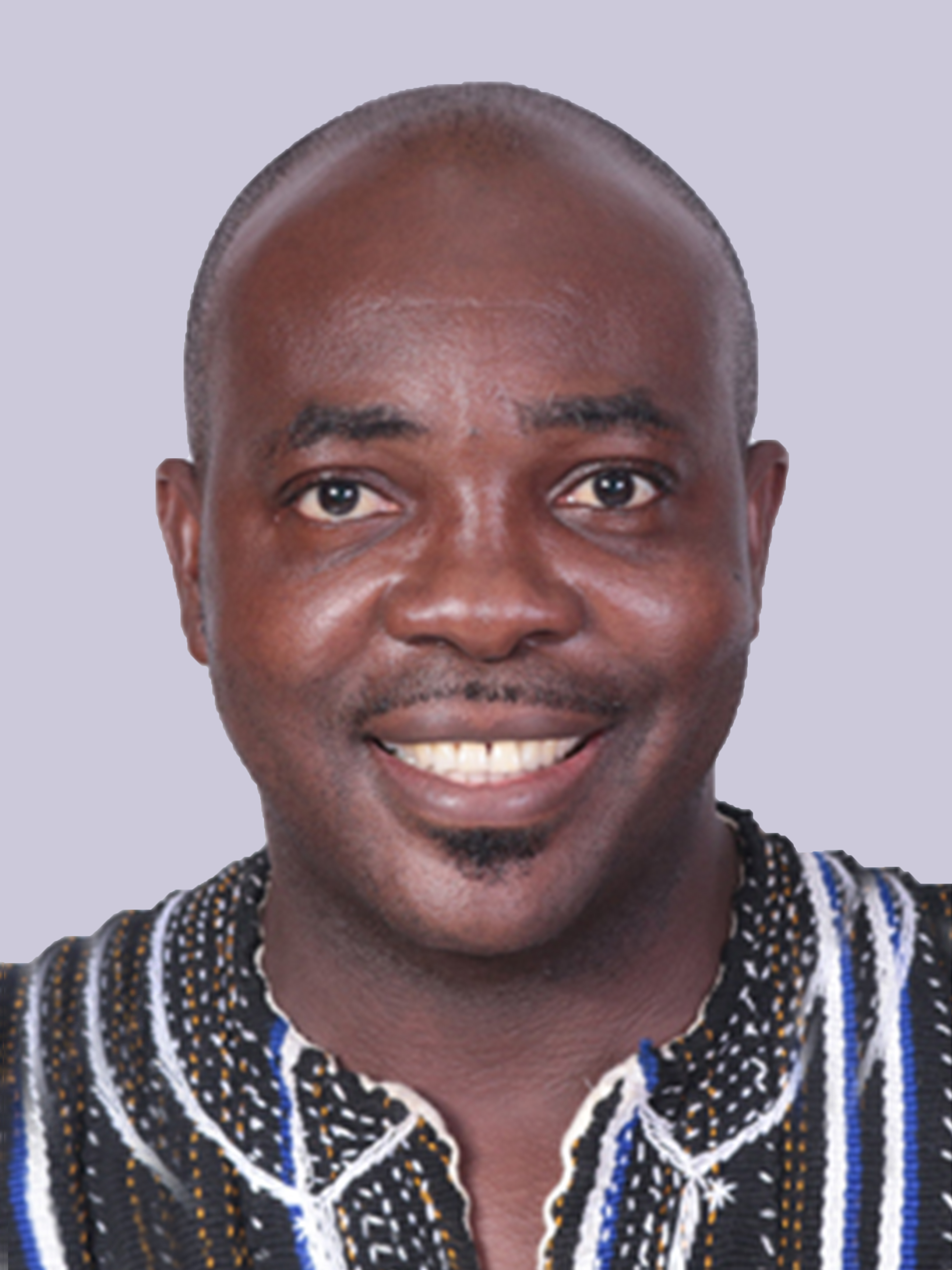
- In office 7 January 2021 – 6 January 2025
- Succeeded by: Seth Osei-Akoto

Minister of Youth and Sports
- In office February 2017 – 6 January 2021
- President: Nana Akufo-Addo
- Preceded by: Edwin Nii Lante Vanderpuye
- Succeeded by: Mustapha Ussif

Member of Ghana Parliament for Atwima Mponua constituency
- Incumbent
- Assumed office 7 January 2005
- Preceded by: Akwasi Dante Afriyie

Personal details
- Born: 24 December 1975 (age 50) Mampong, Ghana
- Party: New Patriotic Party
- Children: 3
- Education: University of Ghana, Ghana Institute of Management and Public Administration
- Profession: Researcher
- Committees: Mines and Energy Committee Poverty Reduction Strategy Committee

Isaac Kwame Asiamah (born 24 December 1975) is a Ghanaian politician of the Republic of Ghana. He is the Member of Parliament of Atwima Mponua constituency. He has been the member of parliament for the constituency in the 4th, 5th, 6th, 7th and the 8th Parliament of the 4th Republic of Ghana. He is a member of the New Patriotic Party of Ghana. From February 2017 to January 2021, he served as the Minister of Youth and Sports.

== Early life and education ==
Isaac Asiamah was born in Mampong, Ghana on 24 December 1975. He attended the University of Ghana, Legon where he graduated with a Bachelor of Arts degree in Geography and Political Science, in 2000. He proceeded to the Ghana Institute of Management and Public Administration for his master's degree in Governance and Leadership, graduating in 2008.

== Career ==
Asiamah has had a varied professional background, including being employed as a Policy Analyst at the New Patriotic Party Headquarters in Accra. He was also the National Youth Secretary of the New Patriotic Party.

== Political career ==
Asiamah entered Ghanaian politics at an early age when he contested and won the Atwima Mponua constituency elections on the ticket of the NPP in 2005. When he won the seat, he was 29 years old, the youngest parliamentarian ever in Ghanaian political history. The current holder of the title of the youngest parliamentarian is Francisca Oteng-Mensah, who, in 2016, was elected at age 23.

=== Minister of Youth and Sports ===
In January 2017, President Nana Akuffo-Addo nominated him for the position of Minister of Youth and Sports in Ghana. He was tasked with improving sporting disciplines and activities in the county by developing young athletes. The president encouraged him to put in place structures to streamline Ghanaian sports and use it as a platform to project Ghanaian athletes on the world stage.

==== Parliamentary vetting ====
The Appointments Committee of Parliament vetted Asiamah on 7 February 2017. During the vetting, he articulated his views on how to improve sports in Ghana. One major change he intended to bring was to transparency in the dealing of the various national teams and government especially on the issue of allowances and bonuses allocated to players.

==== Swearing in ====
President Akuffo-Addo swore in all the ministers who had been approved by Parliament on 10 February 2017. Asiamah was among ten other ministers who received their ministerial charters to begin work in their various ministries.

== Elections ==
=== 2004 Elections ===
Asiamah was elected as the member of parliament for the Atwima Mponua constituency of the Ashanti Region of Ghana for the first time in the 2004 Ghanaian general elections. He won on the ticket of the New Patriotic Party. His constituency was a part of the 36 parliamentary seats out of 39 seats won by the New Patriotic Party in that election for the Ashanti Region. The New Patriotic Party won a majority total of 128 parliamentary seats out of 230 seats. He was elected with 30,012 votes out of 44,217 total valid votes cast equivalent to 67.9% of total valid votes cast. He was elected over John Macitse Oduro H. of the National Democratic Congress and Stephen Osei Bossman of the Convention People's Party. These obtained 30.5% and 1.7% respectively of total valid votes cast.

=== 2008 Elections ===
In 2008, he won the general elections on the ticket of the New Patriotic Party for the same constituency. His constituency was part of the 34 parliamentary seats out of 39 seats won by the New Patriotic Party in that election for the Ashanti Region. The New Patriotic Party won a minority total of 109 parliamentary seats out of 230 seats. He was elected with 25,350 votes out of 44,948 total valid votes cast equivalent to 56.4% of total valid votes cast. He was elected over Amoah Sarpong of the People's National Convention, Ali Yeboah of the National Democratic Congress, Kofi Takyi of the Democratic People's Party, Appiahhene Peter of the Convention People's Party and Raphael Baffour Awuah an independent candidate. These obtained 0.68%, 32.01%, 0.42%, 1.12% and 9.37% respectively of the total votes cast.

=== 2012 Elections ===
In 2012, he won the general elections on the ticket of the New Patriotic Party for the same constituency. He was elected with 33,961 votes out of 59,300 total valid votes cast equivalent to 57.27% of total valid votes cast. He was elected over Kwaku Agyemang-Mensah of the National Democratic Congress and Frank Tachie Mensah of the Convention People's Party. These obtained 41.94% and 0.79% respectively of the total votes cast.

He was re-elected in the 2016 and 2020 general election to represent in both the 7th and 8th Parliament of the Fourth Republic of Ghana.

In the parliamentary primaries of 2024 for the NPP, he was defeated in his attempt to represent the party by Owusu Sekyere. Sekyere secured 377 votes, surpassing his opponent who received 330 votes out of the total valid votes cast.

== Personal life ==
Asiamah is married with three children. He identifies as a Christian and is a member of the Anglican Church of Ghana.

== See also ==
- Minister of Youth and Sports
- Atwima Mponua constituency
- List of MPs elected in the 2016 Ghanaian parliamentary election
