= Akwasi Dante Afriyie =

Ghanaian politician

Hon. Akwasi Dante Afriyie

Member of Parliament for Atwima Mponua Constituency
- In office 7 January 2001 – 6 January 2005
- President: John Kufuor
- Preceded by: Kwame Gyawu-Kyem
- Succeeded by: Isaac Kwame Asiamah

Personal details
- Party: New Patriotic Party

Akwasi Dante Afriyie is a Ghanaian politician and a member of the 2nd Parliament of the 4th Republic of Ghana. He served as a member of parliament for the Atwima Mponua Constituency in the Ashanti Region of Ghana.

== Politics ==
Afriyie took seat firstly during the 1997 Ghanaian general election. In 2000, he won with a majority of 8,153 votes on the ticket of the New Patriotic Party. He lost the seat during the 2004 Ghanaian general election to Isaac Kwame Asiamah of NPP.

== Elections ==
In the year 2000, Afriyie won the general elections as the member of parliament for the Atwima Mponua constituency of the Ashanti Region of Ghana. He won on the ticket of the New Patriotic Party. His constituency was a part of the 31 parliamentary seats out of 33 seats won by the New Patriotic Party in that election for the Ashanti Region. The New Patriotic Party won a majority total of 100 parliamentary seats out of 200 seats. He was elected with 20,245 votes out of 33,726 total valid votes cast. This was equivalent to 61.1% of the total valid votes cast. He was elected over Kwaku A. Mensah of the National Democratic Congress, Osei S. Bossman of the Convention People's Party and Edwina C. Quist of the National Reformed Party. These won 12,092, 453 and 319 votes out of the total valid votes cast respectively. These were equivalent to 36.5%, 1.4% and 1% respectively of total valid votes cast.
