= Nyinahin =

- District Capital
- Location in Ghana Nyinahin (Africa)
- Coordinates: 06°36′00″N 02°07′00″W
- Country: Ghana
- Region: Ashanti Region
- District: Atwima Mponua District
- Elevation: 636 ft (194 m)

Nyinahin is a small town and is the capital of Atwima Mponua, a district in the Ashanti Region of Ghana.

== Transport ==
It is proposed to have a railway station under the ECOWAS rail scheme.

== See also ==
- Railway stations in Ghana
