= Atwima-Nwabiagya North (Ghana parliament constituency) =

Constituency in the Ashanti Region of Ghana

- constituency for the Parliament of Ghana
- District: Atwima Nwabiagya District
- Region: Ashanti Region of Ghana

Current constituency
- Party: New Patriotic Party
- MP: Frank Yeboah

The Atwima-Nwabiagya North is one of the constituencies represented in the Parliament of Ghana. It elects one member of parliament (MP) by the first-past-the-post system of election. Frank Yeboah is the member of parliament for the constituency. Atwima-Nwabiagya North is located in the Atwima Nwabiagya District of the Ashanti Region of Ghana. The constituency and Atwima-Nwabiagya South are sister constituencies born out of the Atwima-Nwabiagya constituency in 2012.

== Boundaries ==
The seat is located within the Atwima District of the Ashanti Region of Ghana.

== See also ==
- List of Ghana Parliament constituencies
