= Wiawso College of Education =

Teacher training college in Sefwi-Wiawso, Ghana

- Motto: Cordi Manui Et Capiti
- Motto in English: With heart, hands and head
- Established: 1952
- Principal: Dr. Emmanuel Carsamer
- Location: Sefwi-Wiawso District, Western North Region, Ghana
- Nickname: Watico
- Website: http://watico.edu.gh/

The Wiawso College of Education is a teacher education college in the Sefwi-Wiawso District, Western North Region, Ghana. The college participated in the DFID-funded T-TEL programme. It is affiliated to the University of Education, Winneba.

== Education ==
In 2019, 385 student teachers graduated with a Diploma in Basic Education.

== History ==
Wiawso College of Education (popularly called Legon of the West) traces its origin to Kumasi. The college was formally opened in 1952 under the name Wiawso Body Corporate Training College. The college pioneered with three tutorial staff and twenty nine students on February 13, 1952. Mr. J.T.N. Yankah who was the acting Principal, Mr. B. A. Quarcoo, senior house master, Mr. E. O. Nortey, tutor and Mr. R. S. A. Kwarteng as the college clerk. Otumfoo Sir Agyemang Prempeh II, the Asantehene, in the company of an interim board of the college paid a visit to the college on February 16, 1952, to add his royal blessings to the birth of WATICO. The Rt. Rev. John S.S. Dally, the then Anglican Bishop of Accra made available to the college the premises of the erstwhile St. Augustine's College for use by the college. The Anglican Day Training College in Accra was moved to Kumasi to be incorporated into Wiawso Training College. The college was renamed Wiawso Anglican Training College (WATICO). On 29 October 1964 the college was moved to Sefwi Wiawso (municipal district) in the Western Region. Female students were first admitted in 1974. The college started with a two–year Teacher's Certificate “B” course. In 1963 the course was extended to four years for the award of Teacher's Certificate “A”. The college later offered three year post- secondary certificate “A”. It was accredited as a tertiary institution in October 2007, and it is among fifteen quasi-specialist Colleges that offer Science, Mathematics and Technical Education for the award of Diploma in Basic education. The college has a total population of 687 students made up of 191 females and 507 males. The staff consists of 34’ teachers ably supported by 45 non-teaching staff.

In 2014, the school campus hosted the National Farmer's Day celebrations. Students threatened to disrupt the ceremonies to protest delays in funding which they said were caused by corruption.

The following are the principals of the college
Name	Years served
J.T.N Yankah	1952 -1954
Samuel Blankson	1954 – 1960
Nkansah Dwamena	1960 – 1965
J.R Kwadwo Wilson	1965 – 1979
Maclean Jacob Anaman	1979 – 1982
John Aitpila	1982 – 1990
S.K Akomiah	1990 – 1999
Albert Kwansa Yorke	1999 – 2005
Georgina Lartey (Mrs.)	2005 –

== Notable alumni ==
In 2013 Nicholas Okota-Wilson, an alumnus of Wiawso College of Education, was judged the National Best Teacher Trainee in 2013 with a record-breaking GPA.

== See also ==
- List of colleges of education in Ghana
