= Frank Yeboah =

Ghanaian politician

Hon. Frank Yeboah
- Incumbent
- Assumed office 7 January 2025
- President: John Mahama

Member of the Ghana Parliament for Atwima-Nwabiagya North
- Incumbent
- Assumed office 7 January 2025

Personal details
- Born: 13 November 1974 (age 51) Darbaa, Ashanti Region
- Party: New Patriotic Party
- Education: Kwame Nkrumah University of Science and Technology, Anglia Ruskin University, Oxford Brookes University, Harvard T.H. Chan School of Public Health
- Occupation: Politician, Educationist
- Committees: Health - Member, Public Accounts - Member (9th Parliament of 4th Republic of Ghana)

Frank Yeboah (born 13 November 1974) is a Ghanaian Chartered Accountant and politician. He is a Member of Parliament for the Atwima Nwabiagya North Constituency in the Ashanti Region. He was elected on the ticket of the New Patriotic Party (NPP) in the 2024 general elections.

== Early life and education ==
Frank Yeboah hails from Darbaa in the Ashanti Region of Ghana. He attended Prempeh College, where he completed his Senior Secondary School Certificate Examination (SSSCE) in 1993.

He holds the following academic and professional qualifications:

- MSc in Procurement & Supply Chain Management – Kwame Nkrumah University of Science and Technology (KNUST), completed in June 2019
- Bachelor of Laws (LLB) – Mountcrest University College (Ghana), August 2017
- MSc in International Accounting – Anglia Ruskin University (UK), June 2009
- BSc (Hons) in Applied Accounting – Oxford Brookes University (UK), July 2008
- Certificate in Public Health – Harvard T.H. Chan School of Public Health (USA), April 2023
- Diploma in Management – Galilee International Management Institute (Israel), December 2019
- CII Membership – Chartered Insurance Institute (UK), June 2013
- ACCA – London College of Accountancy, June 2008
- ICAG Membership – Institute of Chartered Accountants, Ghana, October 2021
- MCIPS – Chartered Institute of Procurement & Supply (UK), June 2019

== Career ==
Before entering politics, Yeboah worked in the health sector. He served as Director of Procurement and Project at the National Health Insurance Authority (NIA).

== Political career ==
Yeboah is a member of the New Patriotic Party (NPP). He contested and won the Atwima Nwabiagya North parliamentary seat in the 2024 general elections. He began his first term in the Eighth Parliament of the Fourth Republic of Ghana in January 2025.

== Parliamentary committees ==
In Parliament, he serves on the following committees:

- Environment, Science and Technology Committee
- Special Budget Committee

== Personal life ==
Frank Yeboah is a Christian.
