= Atwima-Mponua (Ghana parliament constituency) =

Constituency in the Ashanti Region of Ghana

- constituency for the Parliament of Ghana
- District: Atwima Mponua District
- Region: Ashanti Region of Ghana

Current constituency
- Party: New Patriotic Party
- MP: Seth Osei Akoto

Atwima-Mponua is one of the constituencies represented in the Parliament of Ghana. It elects one Member of Parliament (MP) by the first past the post system of election. Seth Osei Akoto is the member of parliament for the constituency. Atwima-Mponua is located in the Atwima Mponua district of the Ashanti Region of Ghana.

== Boundaries ==
The seat is located within the Atwima Mponua District of the Ashanti Region of Ghana.

== Members of Parliament ==
Election	Member	Party
1992		
1996	Akwasi Dante Afriyie	New Patriotic Party
2004	Isaac Kwame Asiamah	New Patriotic Party

== Elections ==
2008 Ghanaian parliamentary election: Atwima-Mponua Source: Ghana Home Page
Party	Candidate	Votes	%	±%
New Patriotic Party	Isaac Kwame Asiamah	25,350	56.4	—
National Democratic Congress	Ali Yeboah	14,390	32.0	—
Independent	Raphael Baffour Awuah	4,202	9.4	—
Convention People's Party	Appiah Hene Peter	502	1.1	—
People's National Convention	Amoah Sarpong	306	0.7	—
Democratic People's Party	Kofi Takyi	188	0.4	—
Majority				—
Turnout				

== See also ==
- List of Ghana Parliament constituencies
