= Atwima Mponua District =

- District
- Districts of Ashanti Region

- Location of Atwima Mponua District within Ashanti
- Coordinates: 6°36′N 2°7′W
- Country: Ghana
- Region: Ashanti
- Capital: Nyinahin

Government
  - District Executive: Wilberforce O. Ansah

Area
  - Total: 2,411 km^{2} (931 sq mi)

Population (2021 Census)
  - Total: 155,254
  - Density: 64.39/km^{2} (166.8/sq mi)
- Time zone: UTC+0 (GMT)

Atwima Mponua District is one of the forty-three districts in Ashanti Region, Ghana, and is the westernmost district in the Ashanti Region. Originally it was formerly part of the then-larger Atwima District in 1988; until part of the district was split off to create Atwima Mponua District by a decree of president John Agyekum Kufuor on 12 November 2003 (effective 18 February 2004); while the remaining part has been renamed as Atwima Nwabiagya District (which it was elevated to municipal district assembly status on 15 March 2018 to become Atwima Nwabiagya Municipal District). The district assembly is located in the western part of Ashanti Region and has Nyinahin as its capital town.

== Populated places ==
- Tano Dumasi
- Hanneggar Village

== Sources ==
- "Districts of Ghana". Statoids.
- GhanaDistricts.com
- 19 New Districts Created , GhanaWeb, November 20, 2003.
