= Atwima Nwabiagya Municipal District =

- Municipal District
- Districts of Ashanti Region

- Location of Atwima Nwabiagya Municipal District within Ashanti
- Coordinates: 6°40′N 1°49′W
- Country: Ghana
- Region: Ashanti
- Capital: Nkawie

Area
  - Total: 2,411 km^{2} (931 sq mi)

Population (2021 Census)
  - Total: 161,893
  - Density: 67.15/km^{2} (173.9/sq mi)
- Time zone: UTC+0 (GMT)

Atwima Nwabiagya Municipal District is one of the forty-three districts in Ashanti Region, Ghana. Originally created as an ordinary district assembly in 1988 when it was known as Atwima District. Later, part of the district was split off by a decree of president John Agyekum Kufuor on 12 November 2003 (effectively 17 February 2004) to create Atwima Mponua District; thus the remaining part was renamed to become Atwima Nwabiagya District. However on 15 March 2018, the northern part of the district was later split off to create Atwima Nwabiagya North District; while the remaining part was elevated to municipal district assembly status on the same year to become Atwima Nwabiagya Municipal District. The municipality is located in the western part of Ashanti Region and has Nkawie as its capital town.

== See also ==
- List of hospitals in the Atwima Nwabiagya District

== Sources ==
- "Districts of Ghana". Statoids.
- GhanaDistricts.com
- 19 New Districts Created , GhanaWeb, November 20, 2003.
