= Nkawie =

- Municipal Capital
- Location in Ghana
- Coordinates: 6°40′N 1°49′W
- Country: Ghana
- Region: Ashanti Region
- District: Atwima Nwabiagya South Municipal
- Elevation: 318 ft (97 m)

Nkawie is a large service and administrative town and the capital of Atwima Nwabiagya Municipality, a municipal in the Ashanti Region of Ghana. Nkawie is located on the western stretch of the Kumasi Bibiani road and bounded by two other major towns. - Toase and Abuakwa. It is home to prosperous business men in Ghana. There is a government hospital, a fire service station, a secondary technical institution and other government institutions like the courts, education offices, health insurance office, post office and the new immigration offices. The Forestry Commission is the second highest revenue earner in the forestry services in Ghana. The Owabi dam also supplies water to the south of the municipality. The famous Barekese dam also located in the Municipality supplies water to about 75% of Kumasi. Politically, the Town is an electoral bank for the New Patriotic Party. Nkawie is the home town of former Ghanaian president John Kufuor.
