= Southern Whaling and Sealing Company =

Defunct UK whaling & sealing shipping company

Southern Whaling and Sealing Company Ltd
- Company type: Subsidiary of Unilever, Christian Salvesen Ltd
- Industry: Whaling
- Founded: 1911
- Defunct: 1941; 85 years ago
- Successor: Palm Line in 1949
- Headquarters: United Kingdom
- Area served: United Kingdom, Southern Atlantic
- Key people: George Driver Irvin Esq (Managing Director)
- Parent: Christian Salvesen Ltd

The Southern Whaling and Sealing Company Ltd (SWSC) were a United Kingdom-based whaling and sealing company, originally formed in 1911 by the partnership of Richard Irvin & Sons of North Shields and the South African-based fishing company Irvin & Johnson. Latterly they were sold to Lever Bros., in 1919 and re-sold to Christian Salvesen Ltd in 1941.

== Early days ==
=== Richard Irvin & Sons ===
Richard Irvin was born in North Shields in 1853, entering the fishing trade in 1864 at age 11. He quickly saw the potential growth of trawl fishing.

Richard Irvin & Sons had already established the Shields Engineering Co and, after purchasing Youngs Dock Co., merged them to become Shields Engineering & Dry Dock Co. Latterly they then became involved in the herring drifting fishery around the same time as steam powered drifters began to be used in NE England and Scotland. The East Coast Herring Drifter Co. was set up in 1900 followed soon after by the Shields Ice & Cold Storage Co. Ltd.

In 1902, Richard's second eldest son, George Driver Irvin was sent to South Africa to investigate the fishing potential there where George established The African Fishing & Trading Co. in 1903, with offices in Cape Town & North Shields.

=== Irvin & Johnson ===
However, the African Fishing & Trading Co. was not profitable and only continued to operate after a merger with another South African fishing company owned by Swedish pioneer Carl Ossian Johnson (1867-1949) in 1909. This merger subsequently lead to the establishment of the firm, Irvin & Johnson in Dec 1910.

=== Foundation ===
In July 1911 Richard Irvin & Sons were granted a licence to engage in whaling from Prince Olav Harbour in South Georgia, and in partnership with Irvin & Johnson, formed a new company, The Southern Whaling & Sealing Company Ltd (SWSC). George Driver Irvin was made Managing Director.

During 1911 they bought Sound of Jura, to be used as a cargo transporter, and also purchased a second hand ship, the Restitution.

The shipbuilding firm of Smith's Dock Co., Middlesbrough were commissioned to construct two steel 92 ft. diesel-powered whale catchers as well as fit a diesel auxiliary in Sound of Jura. However, the diesel engine proved to be unreliable and felt to be too noisy in scaring off the whales, so was replaced by a steam engine.

As well as having a whaling lease at Prince Olav Harbour, South Georgia, SWSC established a station at Port Alexander in Angola. They also undertook some sealing expeditions to Marion & Prince Edward Islands from Cape Town, but these proved unsustainable.

The 1916–17 season failed to produce any whale oil and saw the commencement of the construction of the shore station at Prince Olav Harbour.

SWSC worked in co-operation with Salvesen's at Leith Harbour in 1915–17 to produce as much blubber oil as possible for the war effort in Europe.

== Lever Brothers ownership ==
In 1919 SWSC was sold to Lever Brothers. Lever Bros. developed and modernized the Prince Olav Harbour and operated it until it was closed in 1931.

Lever Bros., who later became Unilever, sold the company to Christian Salvesen Ltd in 1941 when they moved out of the whaling business. This increased Salvesen's fleet by two factory ships and 15 catchers.

== Fleet ==
Ship	Built	Speed (knots)	Type	GRT	Notes
SV Sound of Jura	1896		Transporter	1109	She was a 4-masted barquentine. She was purchased by the newly formed SWSC in 1911, and fitted with an auxiliary 4-cylinder Polar-Diesel 260 bhp engine later the same year by Smith's Dock Co, Middlesbrough. 1912-13 saw the dismasting of Sound of Jura on her homeward voyage. It was carrying a load of whale oil in its bulk tanks which had made the replacement of the mast impossible until the oil had been pumped out. SV 'Sound of Jura' (1896) There was an explosion in the engine room on 24 September 1912 which resulted in assistant engineer William B Teasdale receiving fatal injuries. The diesel engine was not repaired and eventually removed in 1914. She was refitted with auxiliary steam engine in 1916 by T Abernethy & Co Ltd, Aberdeen. During the 1915–16 season, Sound of Jura is recorded as having left South Georgia en route to Falmouth with 9,100 barrels of whale oil. She didn't return to Britain in 1917, instead choosing to go to Baltimore, presumably because of the submarine threat. The Sound of Jura didn't return to South Georgia for the 1918–19 season. She was sold to Irvin & Johnson in 1922. Her last voyage was to Kerguelen in 1926-27 for the Kerguelen Whaling & Sealing Company. She was eventually scrapped in Cape Town in 1938.
SS Restitution	1885		Whale Factory	3290	Built at Wigham Richardsons and Sons, Newcastle upon Tyne, and bought from R Conway & Co., Liverpool. Restitution converted into a whaling factory in Norway. She was also fitted with a wireless telegraph, being among the first whaling factory ships to do so. She was abandoned and sank when on passage from the UK to South Georgia off the Scilly Isles with whaling equipment on 4 November 1916.
SS Southern Author	1950		Whaler	439	SS Southern Author ran ashore on Dassen Island 50 nautical miles (93 km) N. of Cape Town. She was leased to Saldanha Whaling Co., Cape Town and based Saldanha Bay from 1961.
SS Southern Breeze	1936		Whaler	344	Built in Germany at Bremer Vulkan (Vegesack, Germany). She was requisitioned by the Admiralty as HMS Southern Breeze (FY 318) in March 1940 and commissioned in June 1940. She was returned to the owner in February 1946. See Southern-class AS Whaler for all six vessels of this class - of which Southern Breeze was one.
SS Southern Chief	1926		Whaler	295	Built by Smiths Dock Co Ltd, Middlesbrough. On 16 February 1961 she was deliberately scuttled by her owner at the end of her useful life around Leith Harbour, South Georgia.
SS Southern Empress	1914	11	Whale Factory	12,398	Built by William Doxford & Sons Ltd, Sunderland. Built as steam tanker San Jeronimo. In 1928 her owners, Eagle Oil sold her to Southern Whaling & Sealing Co, when she was renamed Southern Empress and converted to whale factory ship. She was en route from New Orleans → New York → Glasgow in Convoy SC 104 while serving with the RFA and carrying a cargo of 11,700 tons of fuel oil and a deck cargo of 21 landing craft when she was torpedoed by U-221 and sunk NW of St. Johns on 14 October 1942. The master, 23 crew members, 20 DBS and four gunners from Southern Empress (Master Olaf Hansen) were lost. 44 crew members, 31 DBS and two gunners were picked up by HMS Potentilla (K 214) (LtCdr Monsson), and transferred to the Norwegian whale factory ship MV Suderøy and landed at Liverpool. Eleven small British landing craft and the following bigger vessels were lost aboard the Southern Empress, namely:- HMS LCM-508, HMS LCM-509, HMS LCM-519, HMS LCM-522, HMS LCM-523, HMS LCM-532, HMS LCM-537, HMS LCM-547, HMS LCM-620 (each 52 tons) and HMS LCT-2006 (291 tons).
SS Southern Field	1929		Whaler	250	The whaler was taken over by the Admiralty (HMS Southern Field (FY 1790)) in March 1940 and returned to the owner in April 1946
SS Southern Flower	1923		Whaler	221	On 28 February 1926 she hit submerged rocks in the Morton Strait and succeeded to reach Deception Island, South Shetland Archipelago, where he was declared a total loss.
SS Southern Flower	1928		Whaler	328	HMT Southern Flower was a British Steam Trawler on commission as a submarine hunter for the Royal Navy. She was torpedoed by German submarine U-1022 and sunk.
SS Southern Flyer	1948		Whaler	438	She ran aground on rocks at Lazarete Beach, Cape Verde after calling in for bunkers while on delivery voyage to South Georgia.
SS Southern Foam	1926		Whaler	295	She ran aground and was wrecked in Conception Bay, Newfoundland sometime in 1970. She was sold to Dominion Metals Ltd. for breaking.
SS Southern Foster	1948		Whaler	438	She foundered and was lost in the South Atlantic on 23 August 1968.
SS Southern Gem	1937		Whaler	593	Built in Germany at Bremer Vulkan (Vegesack, Germany). She was requisitioned by the Admiralty as HMS Southern Gem (FY 247) in March 1940 and commissioned in June 1940. She was returned to the owner in April 1945.
SS Southern Hunter	1954		Whaler	441	She was wrecked on 12 December 1956 whilst trying to avoid a vessel of the Argentine Navy that was sailing in the opposite direction, off Foster Harbour, Deception Island, South Shetland Archipelago.
SS Southern King			Whale Factory		Southern King Built in Germany in 1906 as the cargo steamship Lothringen. Seized in Australia in 1915 and renamed Moora. Converted into a factory ship in 1923 and renamed Southern King. Commanded by Capt William Williams from the village of Rhiw on the Lleyn peninsula in North Wales. Renamed Saluta in 1936 and scrapped in 1951.
MV Southern Paul	1944		Utility	172	This former coastal minesweeper was serving as an auxiliary ship in Leith Harbour, South Georgia. She capsized and sank on 5 September 1964 due to the accumulation of snow and ice on deck.
MV Southern Peter	1944		Utility	172	This former coastal minesweeper was serving as an auxiliary ship in Leith Harbour, South Georgia. She capsized and sank on 5 September 1964 due to the accumulation of snow and ice on deck.
MV Southern Pride	1936		Utility	582	While serving in the Royal Navy as HMS Southern Pride (K249) she ran aground at Freetown, Sierra Leone, and was written off as a total loss.
SS Southern Princess	1915	10	Whale Factory	12,156	Southern Princess was a whale factory ship built in 1915. On 27 February 1917, under her previous owner as the tanker San Patricio for the Eagle Oil Co. she was torpedoed and damaged by U-70 (Otto Wünsche) and, not willing to sink, was then assaulted by gunfire off Orkney. On 8 May 1917 San Patricio was again torpedoed this time by UC-65 (Otto Steinbrinck), off Trevose Head, but again did not sink. She was acquired by Southern Whaling and Sealing Co in 1929 from Eagle Oil Co. Ltd. On 17 March 1943, Southern Princess while in Convoy HX 229, from New York to the Clyde with 10,053 tons of heavy fuel oil and a deck cargo of 463 tons of locomotives and landing craft, she was again torpedoed and sunk by the U-600 (Bernhard Zurmühlen).
SS Southern Shore	1926		Whaler	328	FV Southern Shore was a whaler that was stripped in Leith Harbour in February 1953 and deliberately scuttled off South Georgia in 1954 at the end of her useful life.
SS Southern Sea	1912		Whaler	203	
SS Southern Sky	1912		Whaler	203	On 12 April 1929, the South-African steamer Southern Sky left Coal Harbour for Prince Olav Harbour, South Georgia and went missing. She was never heard of again. 13 people lost their lives. Remains of this vessel were found near Cape Buller. Sky Rock was named after Southern Sky. In 1916, Southern Sky was the ship that carried Ernest Shackleton from South Georgia to Elephant Island in an attempt to rescue the men from the expedition ship Endurance.
SS Southern Sky	1929		Whaler		Built to replace the earlier vessel of the same name, she was sold in 1936 to Union Whaling Company, and was renamed Sidney Smith sailing under a South African flag. She was requisitioned on 8 August 1940 as HMSAS Parktown. She was sunk as a result of enemy action in Tobruk harbour on 21 June 1942.
SS Southern Spray	21 May 1925	12	Whaler	319	Built at Smiths Dock Co., Ltd. (South Bank-on-Tees). She was requisitioned by the Admiralty as HMS Southern Spray (FY 323) in March 1940 and commissioned in March 1940. She was returned to the owner in November 1945. In 1961 she was deliberately sunk by her owners at the end of her useful life near Leith Harbour, South Georgia.
SS Southern Star	27 Jun 1930	12	Whaler	340	Built at Smiths Dock Co., Ltd. (South Bank-on-Tees). She was requisitioned by the Admiralty as HMS Southern Star (FY 329) in March 1940 and commissioned in June 1940. She was returned to the owner in January 1946.
SS Southern Wave	5 Jun 1925	12	Whaler	319	She was the hunting ship sister of Southern Spray. Built at Smiths Dock Co., Ltd. (South Bank-on-Tees). She was requisitioned by the Admiralty as HMS Southern Wave (FY 325) in March 1940 and commissioned in March 1940. She was returned to the owner in December 1945. She was deliberately scuttled by her owners at the end of her useful life near Leith Harbour, South Georgia in 1953.

== Whaling stations in South Georgia ==
The first whaling enterprise on Grytviken, South Georgia on 16 November 1904 by a Norwegian, Carl Anton Larsen. Larsen was manager of Compañía Argentina de Pesca and became a naturalised British citizen. His company was relatively successful in its early years of operation and huge interest in obtaining whaling licences followed. The British Government then imposed restrictions on their issue and conditions to ensure that the complete whale was to be processed rather than just the blubber, to try to sustain the industry.

By 1912, seven whaling stations had been established and South Georgia became known as the southern capital of whaling.

Location	Years of Operation	Notes
Grytviken	1904 to 1965	Grytviken Whaling Station early 20th Century Named from the Swedish for "The Pot Cove" and the principal settlement of South Georgia, Compañía Argentina de Pesca operated Grytviken to 1959. Albion Star (South Georgia) Ltd used it and then sub leased to Gyogyo Kabushiki Ltd of Japan for its last two seasons.
Stromness	1907 to 1961	Situated in Stromness Bay, Stromness was initially a harbour for a moored floating factory; a shore station was built in 1912. Sandefjord Whaling Co., the Southern Whaling and Sealing Co. and Vestfold Whaling Co. operated the station until 1931. In 1917 SWSC leased the Stromness factory and catchers from Sandefjords Hvalfangerselskab while the Prince Olav Harbour was being completed. From 1931 onwards it became a ship repair yard having been purchased by the South Georgia Co. of Leith, a sub-company of Christian Salvesen.
Husvik	1907 to 1961	Situated in Stromness Bay, Husvik was designed to operate a moored floating factory ship with a shore station built in 1910. Tonsberg Hvalfangeri operated the station until it was purchased by Albion Star who closed it in 1960. It was then acquired by the Christian Salvesen Ltd.
Leith Harbour	1909 to 1966	Situated in Stromness Bay, Leith Harbour was operated by the South Georgia Co. The station was sub-leased to Nippon Suisan Ltd of Japan for the final 3 seasons.
Godthul	1908 to 1929	Named from the Norwegian for "Good Hollow", it was shore base for a moored floating factory operated by Messrs Bryde and Dahl. A building and some storage tanks were put ashore.
Ocean Harbour	1909 to 1920	The Ocean Whaling Company operated Ocean Harbour. The company amalgamated with Sandefjord Whaling Co and most of the station was removed to Stromness.
Prince Olav Harbour	1912 to 1932	Prince Olav Harbour started as a moored floating factory until 1916 when a shore station was built. The station was operated by the Southern Whaling and Sealing Company until taken over by the South Georgia Company and partially removed to Leith Harbour.

Two other whaling leases were granted, to Rosita Harbour and Jason Harbour but they were never used as whaling sites, and were only used for refuge by the ships.

The shore-based whaling industry on South Georgia declined due to the scarcity of whales around the island and with the rise in pelagic whaling using factory ships. South Georgia then became used for repair, maintenance and storage.
