= Robert Payne =

Robert Payne may refer to:

- Robert Payne (agriculturalist) (died 1593), planter in Ireland
- Robert Payne (Gloucester MP) (c. 1630 – 1713), MP for Gloucester
- Sir Robert Payne (Huntingdonshire MP) (1573–1631), MP for Huntingdonshire
- Robert Payne (natural philosopher) (1596–1651), clergyman and natural philosopher
- Robert Payne Smith (1818–1895), Anglican Dean of Canterbury
- Robert Payne (author) (1911–1983), English novelist, historian and biographer
- Robert B. Payne, American ornithologist and professor
- Robert E. Payne (born 1941), U.S. federal judge

== See also ==
- Rob Payne, Canadian novelist
- Robert Paine (disambiguation)
