= SWSC =

SWSC may refer to:

- Southwest Suburban Conference, a high school athletic conference in Illinois, US
- Secret World of Santa Claus, a children's television show
- Southern Whaling and Sealing Company, a British whaling company (1911–1941)
- Schlumberger Well Surveying Corporation, a company started by the Schlumberger brothers
