= Robert Paine =

Robert or Bob Paine may refer to:

- Robert Treat Paine (1731–1814), signer of the United States Declaration of Independence
- Robert Treat Paine Jr. (1773–1811), poet and son of the signer
- Robert Treat Paine (North Carolina politician) (1812–1872), U.S. Congressman from North Carolina
- Robert Treat Paine (philanthropist) (1835–1910), Boston lawyer and philanthropist
- Robert Treat Paine Jr. (1866–1961), son of the philanthropist, Democratic candidate for Governor of Massachusetts in 1899 and 1900
- Robert Paine (anthropologist) (1926–2010), English-born Canadian known for his studies of the Sámi people
- Robert T. Paine (zoologist) (1933–2016), American ecologist, who introduced the keystone species concept
- Robert Paine (sculptor) (1870–1946), American artist
- Black Fox (Robert Paine), a superhero in Marvel Comics
- SS Robert Treat Paine, a Liberty ship named for Robert Treat Paine
- USS Robert I. Paine, a Buckley-class destroyer escort of the United States Navy

== See also ==
- Robert Payne (disambiguation)
