= List of shipwrecks in 1964 =

The list of shipwrecks in 1964 includes ships sunk, foundered, grounded, or otherwise lost during 1964.

table of contents
1964
Jan	Feb	Mar	Apr
May	Jun	Jul	Aug
Sep	Oct	Nov	Dec
Unknown date

== January ==
=== 3 January ===
List of shipwrecks: 3 January 1964
Ship	State	Description
Looiersgracht	Netherlands	The coaster collided with Langkloof (South Africa) in the Scheldt near Terneuzen. Three of her eleven crew were reported missing.
Schelde	Belgium	The cargo ship collided with Francois L D (France) in the Nieuwe Waterweg, Netherlands and was beached. Later repaired and returned to service. Francois L D was towed to Schiedam for repairs.

=== 6 January ===
List of shipwrecks: 6 January 1964
Ship	State	Description
Brother George	Liberia	The Liberty ship ran aground in the Dry Tortugas. She was on a voyage from Boca Grande, Florida, United States to a British port. She was refloated on 10 January.

=== 10 January ===
List of shipwrecks: 10 January 1964
Ship	State	Description
Brother George	Liberia	The Liberty ship ran aground off Key West, Florida. She was refloated on 12 January and put in to Port Everglades, Florida.
HMS Tiptoe	Royal Navy	The T-class submarine ran aground in the Clyde at Greenock. Refloated after seven hours.

=== 12 January ===
List of shipwrecks: 12 January 1964
Ship	State	Description
Demeter	United States	The merchant vessel sank.

=== 13 January ===
List of shipwrecks: 13 January 1964
Ship	State	Description
ACS Bullfinch	United Kingdom	The cable-laying ship grounded in the Firth of Clyde. Refloated the next day.

=== 16 January ===
List of shipwrecks: 18 January 1964
Ship	State	Description
Dori	Liberia	The Liberty ship sprang a leak and was beached near Ponta Delgada, Azores, Portugal. She later exploded and sank.

=== 18 January ===
List of shipwrecks: 18 January 1964
Ship	State	Description
Perote	United States	The T2 tanker ran aground on a reef off the Isla de Enmedio, Mexico whilst under tow from Brownsville, Texas to Veracruz, Mexico for scrapping.

=== 20 January ===
List of shipwrecks: 20 January 1964
Ship	State	Description
Bogota	Hong Kong	The cargo ship was driven ashore on Fehmarn, West Germany and severely damaged. She was on a voyage from Gdańsk, Poland to Chittagong, India. She was refloated on 22 January and taken in to Kiel, West Germany, where temporary repairs were made to enable her to complete the voyage. Bogota was laid up at Hong Kong, where she was subsequently lost due to damage sustained in two typhoons.

=== 25 January ===
List of shipwrecks: 25 January 1964
Ship	State	Description
Artemesion	Liberia	The Liberty ship was driven ashore on Gaidhouronisi Island, Crete, Greece. She was on a voyage from Port Sudan, Sudan to a Venezuelan port. She was driven further asbore on 29 January. Refloated on 17 February, she was declared a constructive total loss. Consequently scrapped.
Humpy	United States	The 17-gross register ton, 35.6-foot (10.9 m) fishing vessel was destroyed by fire at Akhiok (sometimes called "Alitak"), Alaska.
John-Wayne	United States	The 16-gross register ton, 34.4-foot (10.5 m) fishing vessel was destroyed by fire at Akhiok (sometimes called "Alitak"), Alaska.
Pafco No. 2	United States	The 12-gross register ton, 33.4-foot (10.2 m) fishing vessel was destroyed by fire at Akhiok (sometimes called "Alitak"), Alaska.
Pafco No. 10	United States	The 28-gross register ton, 42-foot (12.8 m) fishing vessel was destroyed by fire at Akhiok (sometimes called "Alitak"), Alaska.
Pafco No. 11	United States	The 28-gross register ton, 42-foot (12.8 m) fishing vessel was destroyed by fire at Akhiok (sometimes called "Alitak"), Alaska.
Pafco No. 13	United States	The 28-gross register ton, 42-foot (12.8 m) fishing vessel was destroyed by fire at Akhiok (sometimes called "Alitak"), Alaska.
Pafco 21	United States	The 17-gross register ton, 35.6-foot (10.9 m) fishing vessel was destroyed by fire at Akhiok (sometimes called "Alitak"), Alaska.
Pafco 23	United States	The 17-gross register ton, 35.6-foot (10.9 m) fishing vessel was destroyed by fire at Akhiok (sometimes called "Alitak"), Alaska.
Pafco 24	United States	The 17-gross register ton, 35.6-foot (10.9 m) fishing vessel was destroyed by fire at Akhiok (sometimes called "Alitak"), Alaska.
Perote	United States	The T2 Tanker ran aground on the Isla de Enmedio, Mexico. She was being towed from Beaumont, Texas to Veracruz, Mexico for scrapping. She was abandoned as a total loss.
Sacred Heart	United States	The 14-gross register ton, 34-foot (10.4 m) fishing vessel was destroyed by fire at Akhiok (sometimes called "Alitak"), Alaska.
Starling	United States	The 20-gross register ton, 38.2-foot (11.6 m) fishing vessel was destroyed by fire at Akhiok (sometimes called "Alitak"), Alaska.

=== 26 January ===
List of shipwrecks: 26 January 1964
Ship	State	Description
Nysjø	Norway	The fishing vessel was sunk when accidentally rammed by the cargo ship Trattendorf ( East Germany) north-west of the North Cape, Norway. All 14 crew members were lost.

== February ==
=== 2 February ===
List of shipwrecks: 2 February 1964
Ship	State	Description
Security	United Kingdom	The cargo ship collided with Carpathia (West Germany) and sank in the Elbe Estuary. All fourteen crew rescued by Carpathia.

=== 3 February ===
List of shipwrecks: 3 February 1964
Ship	State	Description
Agia Erini L	Lebanon	The Liberty ship foundered in the Pacific Ocean (30°22′N 153°00′E). She was on a voyage from Portland, Maine, United States to Kawasaki, Japan.
Kingsgarth	United Kingdom	The tug collided with Port Launceston (United Kingdom) and sank at Avonmouth Docks, Somerset. Three of her five crew reported missing.

=== 7 February ===
List of shipwrecks: 7 February 1964
Ship	State	Description
Sigdal	Norway	The tanker ran aground on Belmont Island in the East River when it was operating unassisted during a tugboat strike in New York Harbor. It was refloated three days later and had extensive damage.

=== 8 February ===
List of shipwrecks: 8 February 1964
Ship	State	Description
Grammatiki	Greece	The Liberty ship sprang a leak and was abandoned in the Pacific Ocean (40°38′N 159°31′W). She subsequently sank.
Elemir	United States	The converted T2 tanker suffered a structural collapse at sea. She was on a voyage from Sasebo, Japan to Portland, Oregon. She put in to Kobe, Japan where she was condemned. She was consequently scrapped.

=== 10 February ===
List of shipwrecks: 10 February 1964
Ship	State	Description
Cape Spencer	United States	The 185-gross register ton, 85.3-foot (26.0 m) fishing vessel was wrecked on the south shore of Akun Bay (54°15′N 165°30′W) on the northeast coast of Akun Island in the Aleutian Islands.
Dirk	West Germany	The coaster collided with the stores ship USNS Blue Jacket (United States Navy) off Bremen, West Germany, and sank. Six crew reported missing.
HMAS Voyager	Royal Australian Navy	The Daring-class destroyer sank after a collision with the aircraft carrier HMAS Melbourne (Royal Australian Navy) with the loss of 81 lives.

=== 11 February ===
List of shipwrecks: 11 February 1964
Ship	State	Description
Queensgate	United Kingdom	The coaster ran aground off Tynemouth, Northumberland. Later refloated.
San Jacinto	United States	The tanker exploded and broke in two off the coast of Virginia. She was on a voyage from Portland, Maine to Jacksonville, Florida. Subsequently rebuilt and returned to service.

=== 17 February ===
List of shipwrecks: 17 February 1964
Ship	State	Description
Western Clipper	United States	The 125-gross register ton, 78.7-foot (24.0 m) fishing vessel was wrecked on the beach at Atka, Alaska, on Atka Island in the Andreanof Islands subgroup of the Aleutian Islands.

=== 18 February ===
List of shipwrecks: 18 February 1964
Ship	State	Description
Harvey	United States	The 19-gross register ton 39.6-foot (12.1 m) fishing vessel was destroyed by fire at Old Harbor, Alaska.

=== 21 February ===
List of shipwrecks: 21 February 1964
Ship	State	Description
Ambassador	United Kingdom	The cargo ship sank 660 nautical miles (1,220 km) south east of Halifax, Nova Scotia, Canada, having been adrift for three days following engine failure. She had been taken in tow by the tug Elbe (Netherlands) but the tow line parted and she sank (37°22′N 48°51′W). Twenty of her 35 crew were rescued, eleven by USCGC Coos Bay (United States Coast Guard) and nine by Fruen (Norway). Ambassador was on a voyage from Philadelphia, Pennsylvania, United States to London.

=== 23 February ===
List of shipwrecks: 23 February 1964
Ship	State	Description
Brother George	Liberia	The cargo ship ran aground off the south coast of the Isle of Wight, United Kingdom. Refloated the next day with assistance from Schedle (Netherlands).
Witte Zee	Netherlands	The tug struck a rock and sank. She was assisting Abeille 10 (France) and Gatcombe (United Kingdom) to free the Brother George (Liberia). All sixteen crew rescued by the Yarmouth lifeboat and Gatcombe.

== March ==
=== 1 March ===
List of shipwrecks: 1 March 1964
Ship	State	Description
Alma	United States	The 118-gross register ton, 87.2-foot (26.6 m) fishing vessel was destroyed by fire about 20 nautical miles (37 km; 23 mi) southeast of Long Island (57°46′N 152°17′W) in Chiniak Bay (57.7131°N 152.3558°W) in Alaska's Kodiak Archipelago.
Amphialos	Liberia	The tanker broke in two and sank 230 to 270 nautical miles (430 to 500 km) southeast of Liverpool, Nova Scotia, Canada. HMCS Athabaskan (Royal Canadian Navy) rescued 34 of her 36 crew.

=== 6 March ===
List of shipwrecks: 6 March 1964
Ship	State	Description
Bunker Hill	United States	The T2 tanker exploded and broke in two off Anacortes, Washington (approximately 48°23′N 122°45′W) with the loss of five of her 30 crew. Both sections sank.

=== 11 March ===
List of shipwrecks: 11 March 1964
Ship	State	Description
Jan Brons	Netherlands	The coaster ran aground at Dunmore East, Ireland. Six crew rescued by breeches buoy.

=== 14 March ===
List of shipwrecks: 14 March 1964
Ship	State	Description
Jalamanjari	India	The cargo ship ran aground outside Hartlepool Harbour, Co Durham, United Kingdom. She was refloated the next day.
Maria G L	Greece	The Liberty ship ran aground near Yokohama, Japan. She broke in two and sank.

=== 15 March ===
List of shipwrecks: 15 March 1964
Ship	State	Description
Maria G. L.	Greece	The Liberty ship ran aground 30 nautical miles (56 km) south of Yokohama (34°33′N 139°49′E) whilst on a voyage from Los Angeles to Chiba, Japan. She broke in two and sank.
Merak	Netherlands	The coaster ran aground off Walton-on-the-Naze, Essex, United Kingdom. All five crew were rescued.

=== 16 March ===
List of shipwrecks: 16 March 1964
Ship	State	Description
Pegu	United Kingdom	The cargo ship ran aground at Santiago de Cuba, Cuba. She was on a voyage from Saint John's, Newfoundland, Canada to Santiago de Cuba. She was refloated on 23 March and taken in to Santiago de Cubab. Although declared a constructive total loss, she was repaired and returned to service.

=== 18 March ===
List of shipwrecks: 18 March 1964
Ship	State	Description
Lenie	Netherlands	The coaster ran aground on the Caernarvonshire coast. Refloated after three hours.

=== 23 March ===
List of shipwrecks: 23 March 1964
Ship	State	Description
Irvana	United Kingdom	The 135.7-foot (41.4 m) fishing vessel dragged anchor and was driven ashore on rocks in severe weather in the north end of Cushendun Bay, County Antrim, Ireland (55°08′N 6°1′W). Refloated 25 April and taken to Port Glasgow, declared beyond economic repair and broken up.
Unidentified vessel	Portugal	Guinea-Bissau War of Independence: The vessel was sunk by PAIGC action in the Cumbidjan River near Bedanda.
Unidentified vessel	Portugal	Guinea-Bissau War of Independence: The vessel was sunk by PAIGC action in the Rio Grande de Buba River.
Wingfoot	United States	The 8-gross register ton, 30.3-foot (9.2 m) fishing vessel was destroyed by fire at Aaron Creek (56°21′N 131°59′W) in Southeast Alaska

=== 25 March ===
List of shipwrecks: 25 March 1964
Ship	State	Description
C. L. Anderson	United States	The 95-gross register ton, 71.5-foot (21.8 m) State of Alaska fishing vessel was destroyed by a storm off Kodiak Island in Alaska's Kodiak Archipelago at a location identified reported as "Kaline Rock," perhaps a reference to Kalsin Rock or Kalsin Reef at the entrance to Kalsin Bay (57.6317°N 152.4003°W) just south of Kodiak, Alaska.

=== 27 March ===
List of shipwrecks: 27 March 1964
Ship	State	Description
A. Ribich	United States	1964 Alaska earthquake: A tsunami destroyed the 36-gross register ton, 52.7-foot (16.1 m) fishing vessel in the small boat harbor at Kodiak, Alaska.
Adak	United States	1964 Alaska earthquake: A tsunami destroyed the 13-gross register ton, 32.1-foot (9.8 m) fishing vessel at Kodiak, Alaska.
Akhiok	United States	1964 Alaska earthquake: A tsunami destroyed the 12-gross register ton, 31-foot (9.4 m) fishing vessel at Kaguyak (56°51′40″N 153°46′00″W) on the coast of Alaska's Kodiak Island.
Albatross	United States	1964 Alaska earthquake: The 73-gross register ton, 60.7-foot (18.5 m) fishing vessel was reported lost at Kodiak, Alaska.
Almeda	United States	1964 Alaska earthquake: A tsunami destroyed the 13-gross register ton, 34.5-foot (10.5 m) fishing vessel at Seward, Alaska.
Anna C	United States	1964 Alaska earthquake: A tsunami destroyed the 13-gross register ton, 31.3-foot (9.5 m) fishing vessel at Kodiak, Alaska.
Anna O	United States	1964 Alaska earthquake: A tsunami destroyed the 12-gross register ton, 37.8-foot (11.5 m) fishing vessel at Chenega, Alaska.
AnnAdell	United States	1964 Alaska earthquake: A tsunami destroyed the 163-gross register ton, 82.3-foot (25.1 m) fishing vessel at Seward, Alaska.
Betts	United States	1964 Alaska earthquake:The 12-gross register ton, 30.9-foot (9.4 m) fishing vessel was reported lost at Kodiak, Alaska.
Bill	United States	1964 Alaska earthquake: A tsunami destroyed the 12-gross register ton, 37.5-foot (11.4 m) fishing vessel at Seward, Alaska.
Black Cape	United States	1964 Alaska earthquake: A tsunami destroyed the 10-gross register ton, 29.6-foot (9.0 m) fishing vessel on the coast of Kodiak Island in Alaska.
Blue Pacific	United States	1964 Alaska earthquake: A tsunami destroyed the 16-gross register ton, 37.5-foot (11.4 m) fishing vessel at Seward, Alaska.
Bulldozer	United States	1964 Alaska earthquake: A tsunami destroyed the 13-gross register ton, 33.2-foot (10.1 m) fishing vessel at Valdez, Alaska.
Cape Barnabas	United States	1964 Alaska earthquake: A tsunami destroyed the 10-gross register ton, 29.7-foot (9.1 m) fishing vessel on the coast of Kodiak Island in Alaska.
Cape Karluk	United States	1964 Alaska earthquake: A tsunami destroyed the 12-gross register ton, 37.8-foot (11.5 m) fishing vessel at Shearwater Bay (57°20′N 152°55′W) on the southeast coast of Alaska's Kodiak Island.
Christine	United States	1964 Alaska earthquake: A tsunami destroyed the 10-gross register ton, 34-foot (10.4 m) fishing vessel at Valdez, Alaska.
Cindy	United States	1964 Alaska earthquake: The 13-gross register ton, 31.8-foot (9.7 m) fishing vessel was reported lost at Kodiak, Alaska.
Cindy	United States	1964 Alaska earthquake: The vessel was reported lost at Kodiak, Alaska.
Crest	United States	1964 Alaska earthquake: A tsunami destroyed the 13-gross register ton, 36.7-foot (11.2 m) fishing vessel at Seward, Alaska.
Davy-J	United States	1964 Alaska earthquake: The 13-gross register ton, 38.6-foot (11.8 m) motor vessel was reported lost at Kodiak, Alaska.
Donnie	United States	1964 Alaska earthquake: The 8-gross register ton, 28.6-foot (8.7 m) fishing vessel was destroyed at Seward, Alaska.
Duck	United States	1964 Alaska earthquake: A tsunami destroyed the barge at Cordova, Alaska.
Evelyn	United States	1964 Alaska earthquake: A tsunami destroyed the motor vessel at Seward, Alaska.
Explorer	United States	1964 Alaska earthquake: The 13-gross register ton, 36-foot (11.0 m) motor vessel was reported lost at Kodiak, Alaska.
Falcon	United States	1964 Alaska earthquake: A tsunami destroyed the 10-gross register ton, 30.4-foot (9.3 m) fishing vessel at Seward, Alaska.
Falcon	United States	1964 Alaska earthquake: A tsunami destroyed the 17-gross register ton, 35.4-foot (10.8 m) fishing vessel at Seward, Alaska.
Fidelity	United States	1964 Alaska earthquake: The 48-gross register ton, 59.3-foot (18.1 m) fishing vessel was reported lost at Kodiak, Alaska.
Flamingo	United States	1964 Alaska earthquake: A tsunami destroyed the 11-gross register ton, 31.1-foot (9.5 m) motor vessel at Seward, Alaska.
Forward	United States	1964 Alaska earthquake: A tsunami destroyed the 22-gross register ton, 47.5-foot (14.5 m) fishing vessel at Kodiak, Alaska.
Frieda	United States	1964 Alaska earthquake: The Port Bailey (57°56′N 153°02′W), Alaska-based 67-gross register ton, 68.9-foot (21.0 m) motor vessel was reported missing.
G B M Co. No. 3	United States	1964 Alaska earthquake: A tsunami destroyed the 84-gross register ton, 65-foot (19.8 m) motor cargo vessel at Kodiak, Alaska.
Gulf King	United States	1964 Alaska earthquake: A tsunami destroyed the 11-gross register ton, 32-foot (9.8 m) fishing vessel at Valdez, Alaska.
Gypsy	United States	1964 Alaska earthquake: A tsunami destroyed the 57-gross register ton, 70.8-foot (21.6 m) fishing vessel at Valdez, Alaska.
Halcyon	United States	1964 Alaska earthquake: The vessel was reported lost at Kodiak, Alaska.
Hazel A	United States	1964 Alaska earthquake: The 17-gross register ton, 38.8-foot (11.8 m) fishing vessel was reported lost at Kodiak, Alaska.
Heather D	United States	1964 Alaska earthquake: A tsunami destroyed the 8-gross register ton, 27.5-foot (8.4 m) fishing vessel at Valdez, Alaska.
Hekla	United States	1964 Alaska earthquake: The 89-gross register ton, 71.2-foot (21.7 m) fishing vessel was reported lost at Kodiak, Alaska.
Henning-J	United States	1964 Alaska earthquake: The 84-gross register ton, 69.9-foot (21.3 m) fishing vessel was reported lost at Kodiak, Alaska.
Ilaott	United States	1964 Alaska earthquake: A tsunami destroyed the 15-gross register ton, 38.7-foot (11.8 m) fishing vessel at Seward, Alaska.
Invincla	United States	1964 Alaska earthquake: The vessel was reported lost at Kodiak, Alaska.
Isabel N	United States	1964 Alaska earthquake: The vessel was reported lost at Kodiak, Alaska.
Jaguar	United States	1964 Alaska earthquake: The Kodiak Island, Alaska-based 98-gross register ton, 64.5-foot (19.7 m) fishing vessel was reported lost.
Jim Alice	United States	1964 Alaska earthquake: A tsunami destroyed the fishing vessel at Valdez, Alaska.
Jo	United States	1964 Alaska earthquake: A tsunami destroyed the 12-gross register ton, 33.7-foot (10.3 m) fishing vessel at Valdez, Alaska.
Joanne	United States	1964 Alaska earthquake: The 12-gross register ton, 39.6-foot (12.1 m) fishing vessel was reported lost at Kodiak, Alaska.
Jodoha	United States	1964 Alaska earthquake: A tsunami destroyed the 9-gross register ton, 35.6-foot (10.9 m) fishing vessel at Valdez, Alaska.
Judy	United States	1964 Alaska earthquake: A tsunami destroyed the 12-gross register ton, 30.7-foot (9.4 m) fishing vessel at Seward, Alaska.
K F C 6	United States	1964 Alaska earthquake: The 9-gross register ton, 30-foot (9.1 m) fishing vessel was reported lost at Kodiak, Alaska.
K F C 127	United States	1964 Alaska earthquake: A tsunami destroyed the 8-gross register ton, 27.5-foot (8.4 m) fishing vessel on the coast of Kodiak Island in Alaska.
King	United States	1964 Alaska earthquake: A tsunami destroyed the motor vessel at Kodiak, Alaska.
Leading Lady	United States	1964 Alaska earthquake: The 57-gross register ton, 57.8-foot (17.6 m) fishing vessel was reported lost at Kodiak, Alaska.
Loral	United States	1964 Alaska earthquake: The 26-gross register ton, 48.4-foot (14.8 m) fishing vessel was reported lost at Kodiak, Alaska.
Lottie M	United States	1964 Alaska earthquake: A tsunami destroyed the motor vessel at Cordova, Alaska.
Lucky Star	United States	1964 Alaska earthquake: A tsunami destroyed the 44-gross register ton, 49.6-foot (15.1 m) fishing vessel at Kodiak, Alaska.
Marguerite	United States	1964 Alaska earthquake: The vessel was reported lost at Kodiak, Alaska.
Marie N	United States	1964 Alaska earthquake: The 10-gross register ton, 38-foot (11.6 m) pleasure craft was driven ashore and wrecked by a tsunami at Kodiak, Alaska.
Marmot Cape	United States	1964 Alaska earthquake: The Port Bailey (57°56′N 153°02′W), Alaska-based vessel was reported missing.
Mary L	United States	1964 Alaska earthquake: The 8-gross register ton, 31.3-foot (9.5 m) fishing vessel was reported lost at Kodiak, Alaska.
Mary-Ruby	United States	1964 Alaska earthquake: The 119-gross register ton, 78.2-foot (23.8 m) fishing vessel was reported lost at Kodiak, Alaska.
Marylee	United States	1964 Alaska earthquake: A tsunami destroyed the 11-gross register ton, 29.3-foot (8.9 m) fishing vessel at Kodiak, Alaska.
Melody	United States	1964 Alaska earthquake: A tsunami destroyed the 9-gross register ton, 31-foot (9.4 m) fishing vessel at Seward, Alaska.
Millie S	United States	1964 Alaska earthquake: A tsunami destroyed the 21-gross register ton, 43-foot (13.1 m) passenger vessel at Seward, Alaska.
Miss Arctic	United States	1964 Alaska earthquake: The 31-gross register ton, 44.1-foot (13.4 m) fishing vessel was reported lost at Kodiak, Alaska.
Moon	United States	1964 Alaska earthquake: A tsunami destroyed the 8-gross register ton, 30-foot (9.1 m) fishing vessel at Seward, Alaska.
Nefco 7	United States	1964 Alaska earthquake: A tsunami destroyed the 80-gross register ton, 66.3-foot (20.2 m) barge at Point Shepard (60°38′N 145°40′W), Alaska.
Nellie Juan #5	United States	1964 Alaska earthquake: A tsunami washed the barge over 100 feet (30 m) inland at Mink Cove, Port Nellie Juan (60.5658°N 148.2286°W), Alaska. The overturned barge was abandoned where the tsunami left her and became covered with vegetation.
Neptune	United States	1964 Alaska earthquake: The 85-gross register ton, 69.9-foot (21.3 m) motor cargo vessel was reported lost at Kodiak, Alaska.
Norman J	United States	1964 Alaska earthquake: The 18-gross register ton, 35.7-foot (10.9 m) fishing vessel was reported lost at Kodiak, Alaska.
North Wind	United States	1964 Alaska earthquake: A tsunami destroyed the 21-gross register ton, 45.8-foot (14.0 m) diesel pleasure craft at Seward, Alaska.
Ocean Queen	United States	1964 Alaska earthquake: The 13-gross register ton, 39.5-foot (12.0 m) fishing vessel was reported lost at Kodiak, Alaska.
Oma Belle	United States	1964 Alaska earthquake: A tsunami destroyed the 11-gross register ton, 34.4-foot (10.5 m) fishing vessel at Cordova, Alaska.
Oranius	United States	1964 Alaska earthquake: The Kodiak, Alaska-based 18-gross register ton, 37.3-foot (11.4 m) fishing vessel was reported missing.
Padilla	United States	1964 Alaska earthquake: The 20-gross register ton, 38.6-foot (11.8 m) fishing vessel was reported lost at Kodiak, Alaska.
Peril Cape	United States	1964 Alaska earthquake: The Port Bailey 57°56′N 153°02′W), Alaska-based 27-gross register ton, 39.9-foot (12.2 m) fishing vessel was reported missing.
Quadra	United States	1964 Alaska earthquake: A tsunami destroyed the 50-gross register ton, 64.8-foot (19.8 m) fishing vessel at Kodiak, Alaska.
Radar	United States	1964 Alaska earthquake: A tsunami destroyed the 16-gross register ton, 36.5-foot (11.1 m) fishing vessel at Valdez, Alaska.
Rainier	United States	1964 Alaska earthquake: A tsunami destroyed the 15-gross register ton, 35.8-foot (10.9 m) fishing vessel at Seward, Alaska.
Renee	United States	1964 Alaska earthquake: A tsunami destroyed the 7-gross register ton, 26.8-foot (8.2 m) fishing vessel in Shearwater Bay (57°20′N 152°55′W) on the coast of Kodiak Island.
Roosevelt	United States	1964 Alaska earthquake: A tsunami destroyed the 20-gross register ton, 42.6-foot (13.0 m) fishing vessel at Kodiak, Alaska.
S J No. 7	United States	1964 Alaska earthquake: A tsunami destroyed the 9-gross register ton, 30-foot (9.1 m) fishing vessel at Kodiak, Alaska.
Saint Therese	United States	1964 Alaska earthquake: A tsunami destroyed the 14-gross register ton, 33.1-foot (10.1 m) fishing vessel in Prince William Sound near Chenega, Alaska.
Salty Dog	United States	1964 Alaska earthquake: A tsunami destroyed the 23-gross register ton, 44.1-foot (13.4 m) fishing vessel at Valdez, Alaska.
San Juan #4	United States	1964 Alaska earthquake: A tsunami destroyed the barge at Seward, Alaska.
Sea Bird	United States	1964 Alaska earthquake: A tsunami destroyed the 41-gross register ton, 51.6-foot (15.7 m) fishing vessel at Woody Island near Kodiak, Alaska.
Sea Idle	United States	1964 Alaska earthquake: A tsunami destroyed the 11-gross register ton, 29.1-foot (8.9 m) motor pleasure craft at Seward, Alaska.
Sea Scout Boat	United States	1964 Alaska earthquake: The vessel was reported missing at Kodiak, Alaska.
Selief	United States	1964 Alaska earthquake: The 163-gross register ton, 82.2-foot (25.1 m) fishing vessel was reported lost at Kodiak, Alaska.
Shuyak	United States	1964 Alaska earthquake: The 31-gross register ton, 53.8-foot (16.4 m) fishing vessel was reported lost at Kodiak, Alaska.
Silver Spray	United States	1964 Alaska earthquake: A tsunami destroyed the 14-gross register ton, 35-foot (10.7 m) fishing vessel at Seward, Alaska.
Sitka	United States	1964 Alaska earthquake: The Kodiak, Alaska-based vessel was reported lost.
Sophia King	United States	1964 Alaska earthquake: The vessel was reported lost at Kodiak, Alaska.
Spruce Cape	United States	1964 Alaska earthquake: A tsunami destroyed the 17-gross register ton, 37.8-foot (11.5 m) fishing vessel at Kodiak Island, Alaska.
Standard No. 1	United States	1964 Alaska earthquake: A tsunami destroyed the 226-gross register ton, 90-foot (27.4 m) barge at the Copper River Flats near Cordova, Alaska.
Steelhead	United States	1964 Alaska earthquake: A tsunami destroyed the 12-gross register ton, 36-foot (11.0 m) fishing vessel at Valdez, Alaska.
Sweet Fish	United States	1964 Alaska earthquake: A tsunami destroyed the 13-gross register ton, 40-foot (12.2 m) fishing vessel at Seward, Alaska.
Tazlina	United States	1964 Alaska earthquake: A tsunami destroyed the 17 GRT, 41.5-foot (12.6 m) fishing vessel at Seward, Alaska.
Tern	United States	1964 Alaska earthquake: A tsunami destroyed the 8 GRT, 28-foot (8.5 m) fishing vessel at Seward, Alaska.
The Nova	United States	1964 Alaska earthquake: A tsunami destroyed the 10 GRT, 29-foot (8.8 m) fishing vessel at Seward, Alaska.
Tiny	United States	1964 Alaska earthquake: The vessel was lost at Kodiak, Alaska.
Toots	United States	1964 Alaska earthquake: The vessel was reported lost at Kodiak, Alaska.
U F No. 2	United States	1964 Alaska earthquake: A tsunami destroyed the 9 GRT, 30.1-foot (9.2 m) fishing vessel at Kodiak, Alaska.
Vega	United States	1964 Alaska earthquake: A tsunami destroyed the 28 GRT 48-foot (14.6 m) wooden fishing vessel at Seward, Alaska.
Venture	United States	1964 Alaska earthquake: A tsunami destroyed the 9 GRT, 37-foot (11.3 m) wooden fishing vessel at Kodiak, Alaska.
Venus	United States	1964 Alaska earthquake: A tsunami destroyed the 19 GRT, 42-foot (12.8 m) wooden fishing vessel at Seward, Alaska.
Verdon	United States	1964 Alaska earthquake: A tsunami destroyed the 11 GRT, 32.2-foot (9.8 m) wooden fishing vessel at Valdez, Alaska.
Victory Maid	United States	1964 Alaska earthquake: The 67 GRT, 62.1-foot (18.9 m) fishing vessel was lost at Kodiak, Alaska.
Wafico No. 9	United States	1964 Alaska earthquake: A tsunami destroyed the 8 GRT, 31-foot (9.4 m) fishing vessel at Ouzinkie, Alaska.
Wafico No. 12	United States	1964 Alaska earthquake: The Port William, Alaska-based 9 GRT, 30-foot (9.1 m) fishing vessel was reported missing.
West Cape	United States	1964 Alaska earthquake: A tsunami destroyed the 10 GRT, 29.6-foot (9.0 m) fishing vessel at Kodiak Island, Alaska.
Widgeon	United States	1964 Alaska earthquake: A tsunami destroyed the 10 GRT, 29.4-foot (9.0 m) fishing vessel at Kodiak, Alaska.
Windbird	United States	1964 Alaska earthquake: The 11 GRT, 37.3-foot (11.4 m) yacht was reported lost at Kodiak, Alaska.
Yukon	United States	1964 Alaska earthquake: The 40 GRT, 52.6-foot (16.0 m) vessel was reported lost at Kodiak, Alaska.

=== 28 March ===
List of shipwrecks: 18 March 1964
Ship	State	Description
Tajo	Liberia	The Liberty ship sprang a leak and was beached near Las Palmas, Canary Islands, a total loss. She was on a voyage from Takoradi, Ghana to Rotterdam, South Holland, Netherlands.

== April ==
=== 2 April ===
List of shipwrecks: 2 April 1964
Ship	State	Description
Cindy	United States	1964 Alaska earthquake: The 14-gross register ton, 43.6-foot (13.3 m) fishing vessel was wrecked at Kodiak, Alaska.
Vagabond	United States	The 11 GRT, 39.9-foot (12.2 m) wooden fishing vessel was destroyed by a storm in the harbor at St. Paul on Saint Paul Island in the Pribilof Islands.

=== 4 April ===
List of shipwrecks: 4 April 1964
Ship	State	Description
Mule	United States	A storm destroyed the 31-gross register ton, 51.9-foot (15.8 m) fishing vessel near Cape Spencer, Alaska.

=== 6 April ===
List of shipwrecks: 6 April 1964
Ship	State	Description
Dom Jose	Brazil	The ferry, a converted Landing Ship, Tank, foundered in the Atlantic Ocean (6°00′N 56°30′W. She was being towed from Paramaribo, Suriname to Georgetown, Guyana by the tug Ginny (Bahamas).

=== 8 April ===
List of shipwrecks: 8 April 1964
Ship	State	Description
Blue Ocean	Canada	The 68-foot (20.7 m) halibut-fishing vessel was lost in Unimak Pass in the Aleutian Islands in a blinding snowstorm with 80-mile-per-hour (130 km/h) winds when her crew of eight abandoned her on the beach during the storm.

=== 10 April ===
List of shipwrecks: 10 April 1964
Ship	State	Description
Arrow	United States	The 22-gross register ton, 46.7-foot (14.2 m) fishing vessel was destroyed by fire at Kodiak, Alaska.

=== 13 April ===
List of shipwrecks: 13 April 1964
Ship	State	Description
Anapa	Soviet Union	The fishing trawler collided with the frigate HDMS Esbern Snare (Royal Danish Navy) and sank in the Øresund. All 23 crew rescued by HDMS Esbern Snare.
Neckerbay	United States	The 13-gross register ton, 35.5-foot (10.8 m) motor vessel sank in Krestof Sound (57°12′N 135°35′W) in Southeast Alaska near Sitka, Alaska, after striking a log.

=== 14 April ===
List of shipwrecks: 14 April 1964
Ship	State	Description
Hustler	United States	During a test run on Lake Havasu on the border between Arizona and California for a planned attempt to break the world water speed record, the hydroplane – which its support crew thought had reached 290 miles per hour (470 km/h) during the run – crashed into the shore at a speed of at least 100 miles per hour (160 km/h) after its pilot, Lee Taylor, was unable to turn off its jet engine. Taylor leaped from the boat before the crash while traveling at 175 miles per hour (282 km/h) and bounced along the surface of the water for 50 feet (15 m) before coming to rest with severe injuries. The damaged boat crossed the shore and came to rest 25 to 30 feet (7.6 to 9.1 m) inland up a 20-degree incline.

=== 18 April ===
List of shipwrecks: 18 April 1964
Ship	State	Description
Christitsa	Greece	The Liberty ship collided with Città di Beirut (Italy off Hydra Island. Christitsa was on a voyage from Algiers, Algeria to Eleusis. She was beached at Kynosoura.

=== 19 April ===
List of shipwrecks: 19 April 1964
Ship	State	Description
Norco	Bahamas	The cargo ship ran aground and was wrecked and abandoned on Little Corn Island in the Caribbean Sea.

=== 23 April ===
List of shipwrecks: 3 April 1964
Ship	State	Description
Mercantile Victory	Liberia	The Victory ship caught fire in the Red Sea (23°57′N 36°30′E). She was on a voyage from Houston, Texas, United States to Basrah, Iraq. She was towed in to Suez, Egypt. Consequently scrapped in May 1965.

== May ==
=== 1 May ===
List of shipwrecks: 1 May 1964
Ship	State	Description
No. 107	Republic of China Navy	Chinese Civil War: The Hai Lang-class assault boat was sunk by gunfire by the patrol boat No. 572 ( (China) People's Liberation Army Navy).
No. 109	Republic of China Navy	Chinese Civil War: The Hai Lang-class assault boat was sunk by gunfire by the patrol boat No. 572 ( (China) People's Liberation Army Navy).

=== 2 May ===
List of shipwrecks: 2 May 1964
Ship	State	Description
Alkimos	Greece	The wreck of Alkimos on 22 September 2012. The Liberty ship dragged her anchor and was wrecked in the Indian Ocean on the Eglinton Rocks off what is now Yanchep, Western Australia.
USNS Card	United States Navy	Vietnam War: A limpet mine attached by a North Vietnamese frogman sank the aircraft transport, a former Bogue-class escort carrier, as she lay alongside a pier at Saigon, South Vietnam, killing five of her crew. She was refloated on 19 May 1964 and returned to service in December 1964.

=== 4 May ===
List of shipwrecks: 4 May 1964
Ship	State	Description
Dynamite Kid	United States	The 33-gross register ton, 50.1-foot (15.3 m) fishing vessel sank in Cook Inlet on the south-central coast of Alaska about 16 nautical miles (30 km; 18 mi) off Point Pogibshi (59°25′30″N 151°53′00″W).

=== 10 May ===
List of shipwrecks: 10 May 1964
Ship	State	Description
Dona S	United States	The 106-gross register ton, 70.4-foot (21.5 m) fishing vessel sank off Baranof Island in the northern Alexander Archipelago in Southeast Alaska.

=== 17 May ===
List of shipwrecks: 17 May 1964
Ship	State	Description
Amazon River	United Kingdom	The Liberty ship ran aground on the Seranilla Bayk, 200 nautical miles (370 km) off Kingston, Jamaica. She was on a voyage from Cuba to a Japanese port. Refloated on 27 May and towed in to Kingston. Consequently declared a constructive total loss, she was scrapped in 1967.

=== 23 May ===
List of shipwrecks: 23 May 1964
Ship	State	Description
Mermaid	United States	The 24-gross register ton, 41.3-foot (12.6 m) fishing vessel was destroyed by fire at Kodiak, Alaska.

=== 26 May ===
List of shipwrecks: 26 May 1964
Ship	State	Description
Pygmalion	United Kingdom	The 35-ton fishing vessel sank after a gas stove exploded 9 miles east of the Point of Ayre, Isle of Man. Crew rescued from life raft 14 hours later by trawler "Lorraine" (United Kingdom).

=== 27 May ===
List of shipwrecks: 27 May 1964
Ship	State	Description
Almarie	United States	The 12-gross register ton, 36.8-foot (11.2 m) fishing vessel was wrecked on Rosa Reef (55°24′45″N 131°48′05″W) in Southeast Alaska about 2 nautical miles (3.7 km; 2.3 mi) north of Ketchikan, Alaska.

=== 28 May ===
List of shipwrecks: 28 May 1964
Ship	State	Description
Madura	Liberia	The cargo ship was driven ashore in a typhoon at Hong Kong. She was refloated on 10 July but declared at constructive total loss and consequently scrapped.

== June ==
=== 1 June ===
List of shipwrecks: 1 June 1964
Ship	State	Description
P S & W H Ry No. 3	United States	The 167-gross register ton, 105-foot (32.0 m) barge sank in the Kuskokwim River near Bethel, Alaska.

=== 3 June ===
List of shipwrecks: 3 June 1964
Ship	State	Description
Poseidon 3	Belgium	The collier collided with Bencruachan (United Kingdom) in the Scheldt at Hansweert, Netherlands, and sank. One life was lost.

=== 8 June ===
List of shipwrecks: 8 June 1964
Ship	State	Description
Brasilmar	Brazil	The 260.9-foot (79.5 m), 1,759-ton cargo vessel was wrecked off Guaropaba, 12 nautical miles (22 km) north of Imbituba, Santa Catarina, Brazil.

=== 12 June ===
List of shipwrecks: 12 June 1964
Ship	State	Description
Minnie K	United States	The 10-gross register ton, 30.8-foot (9.4 m) fishing vessel sank at Meyers Chuck, Alaska.

=== 13 June ===
List of shipwrecks: 13 June 1964
Ship	State	Description
Armando II	Cuba	The fishing vessel was sunk by a Cuban exile-operated speedboat, with 18 crew members injured.

=== 20 June ===
List of shipwrecks: 20 June 1964
Ship	State	Description
Penn Mariner	Liberia	The Liberty ship sprang a leak and sank in the Indian Ocean 270 nautical miles (500 km) north east of Ceylon (12°07′N 85°38′E). She was on a voyage from Calcutta, India to Kobe, Japan.

=== 21 June ===
List of shipwrecks: 21 June 1964
Ship	State	Description
Union Atlantic	Panama	The Liberty ship sprang a leak and was abandoned in the Bay of Bengal (12°07′N 85°58′E). Presumed subsequently sank.

=== 29 June ===
List of shipwrecks: 29 June 1964
Ship	State	Description
Rajah Soliman	Philippines	Typhoon Winnie/Dading: The destroyer escort sank while tied up at a dock. She later was raised and sold for scrap.

== July ==
=== 2 July ===
List of shipwrecks: 2 July 1964
Ship	State	Description
Chung Hsing No. 5	China	The 360.9-foot (110.0 m), 3,461-ton cargo vessel was sunk in a collision with Ocean Seigneur (Greece) in the Yellow Sea (37°37′00″N 122°41′00″E).

=== 3 July ===
List of shipwrecks: 3 July 1964
Ship	State	Description
Bonifaz	Spain	The tanker collided with Fabiola (France) off the Spanish coast in fog. Bonifaz caught fire and sank. Six of her 50 crew were rescued by Sloman Malaga (West Germany). Bonifaz was also carrying six passengers. Setas (Netherlands) picked up 22 crew and three passengers. Four of the crew subsequently died of their injuries.
Jean	United States	The 7-gross register ton, 29.5-foot (9.0 m) fishing vessel sank at Cape Chacon (54°41′30″N 132°00′50″W) in Southeast Alaska.

=== 8 July ===
List of shipwrecks: 8 July 1964
Ship	State	Description
Arromanches	United Kingdom	The ferry ran aground off Seaford, Sussex in a storm. Refloated after three hours.
Man Quingshéng	Republic of China Navy	Chinese Civil War: The infiltration ship was damaged by gunfire and captured by the frigate Hengyang ( (China) People's Liberation Army Navy), but sank under tow before reaching port.
Man Quingsheng	Republic of China Navy	Chinese Civil War: The infiltration ship was sunk by gunfire by the minesweeper Shajiadian ( (China) People's Liberation Army Navy).

=== 10 July ===
List of shipwrecks: 10 July 1964
Ship	State	Description
Virginia	United States	The 10 GRT, 29.7-foot (9.1 m) fishing vessel foundered in Cook Inlet off the coast of Alaska.

=== 12 July ===
List of shipwrecks: 12 July 1964
Ship	State	Description
Daijin No. 1	Republic of China Navy	Chinese Civil War: The infiltration ship was sunk by gunfire near Hainan, China, by the submarine chasers No. 272 and No. 274 (both People's Liberation Army Navy). She and the infiltration ship Daijin No. 2 (Republic of China Navy) suffered a combined total of 14 killed and 60 taken as prisoners of war.
Daijin No. 2	Republic of China Navy	Chinese Civil War: The infiltration ship was sunk by gunfire near Hainan, China, by the submarine chasers No. 272 and No. 274 (both People's Liberation Army Navy). She and the infiltration ship Daijin No. 1 suffered a combined total of 14 killed and 60 taken as prisoners of war.
Minnie S	United States	The 17-gross register ton, 38.4-foot (11.7 m) fishing vessel sank in Prince William Sound northwest of Green Island on the south-central coast of Alaska.

=== 16 July ===
List of shipwrecks: 16 July 1964
Ship	State	Description
Trepassey	Canada	The sailing ship foundered off Halifax, Nova Scotia (43°10′N 63°10′W).

=== 17 July ===
List of shipwrecks: 17 July 1964
Ship	State	Description
Syra	Greece	The Liberty ship ran aground at Callao, Peru (6°07′S 81°06′W). She was later refloated but declared a constructive total loss and scrapped.

=== 21 July ===
List of shipwrecks: 21 July 1964
Ship	State	Description
Gay Lady	United States	The 11-gross register ton, 29.9-foot (9.1 m) fishing vessel struck a submerged object in Prince William Sound on the south-central coast of Alaska and was lost.
Marquette	France	The cargo ship caught fire in the Atlantic Ocean 800 nautical miles (1,500 km) south east of Cape Race, Newfoundland, Canada. Her 28 crew were rescued by the ore carrier Pentellina (France). Marquette was on a voyage from Montreal, Quebec, Canada to Lisbon, Portugal.

=== 22 July ===
List of shipwrecks: 22 July 1964
Ship	State	Description
John F. Shafroth	United States	The Liberty ship was scuttled 47 nautical miles (87 km) west of Golden Gate, California with a cargo of obsolete ammunition.

=== 23 July ===
List of shipwrecks: 23 July 1964
Ship	State	Description
General Pershing	United States	The 44-gross register ton, 59.6-foot (18.2 m) fishing vessel was destroyed by a storm near Valdez, Alaska, about 4 nautical miles (7.4 km; 4.6 mi) southeast of Glacier Island (60°33′N 147°11′W).

=== 24 July ===
List of shipwrecks: 24 July 1964
Ship	State	Description
Snoopy	United States	The fishing trawler was sunk by a World War II torpedo she brought up in her nets off Currituck Sound, North Carolina. Eight crew were killed, the other four were wounded.
Star of Alexandria	Egypt	The cargo ship exploded and sank at Bône, Algeria, killing at least twenty people and injuring at least 165 others.

=== Unknown date ===
List of shipwrecks: Unknown July 1964
Ship	State	Description
Unidentified vessel	Portuguese Navy	Guinea-Bissau War of Independence: The vessel was sunk by PAIGC action at Quitafine in the Cacine River sometime in July.

== August ==
=== 1 August ===
List of shipwrecks: 1 August 1964
Ship	State	Description
Yukon	United States	The fishing vessel sank in Malina Bay (58°13′N 153°05′W) near Kodiak, Alaska. Her crew survived and reached shore aboard a life raft.

=== 2 August ===
List of shipwrecks: 2 August 1964
Ship	State	Description
Violet	United States	The 11 GRT, 31.7-foot (9.7 m) fishing vessel was destroyed by fire in Anchorage Bay near Chignik, Alaska.

=== 4 August ===
List of shipwrecks: 4 August 1964
Ship	State	Description
USS Spikefish	United States Navy	The decommissioned Balao-class auxiliary submarine was sunk as a target in the Atlantic Ocean off Long Island, New York.

=== 6 August ===
List of shipwrecks: 6 August 1964
Ship	State	Description
Guernsey Coast	United Kingdom	The coaster collided with the steamer Catcher (Liberia) 30 nautical miles (56 km) off Cherbourg, France, and sank. One crewman was reported missing.

=== 8 August ===
List of shipwrecks: 8 August 1964
Ship	State	Description
Ema Marie	United States	The 7-gross register ton, 31.5-foot (9.6 m) fishing vessel sank in Iliamna Bay on the southeastern coast of the Alaska Peninsula in Alaska.

=== 10 August ===
List of shipwrecks: 10 August 1964
Ship	State	Description
Laurie Ann	United States	The motor vessel was destroyed by fire at Cordova, Alaska.

=== 11 August ===
List of shipwrecks: 11 August 1964
Ship	State	Description
S J No. 5	United States	The motor vessel sank in Uyak Bay on the coast of Kodiak Island 4 nautical miles (7.4 km) from Harvester Island (57°39′N 154°00′W).

=== 25 August ===
List of shipwrecks: 25 August 1964
Ship	State	Description
Kenya	United Kingdom	The tug collided with Maarshaven (Netherlands) and sank at Tilbury, Essex, United Kingdom. Later raised and beached.

== September ==
=== 1 September ===
List of shipwrecks: 1 September 1964
Ship	State	Description
Medina Princess	United Kingdom	The cargo ship was driven onto a reef off Djibouti. She was sold for scrapping in 1967.

=== 5 September ===
List of shipwrecks: 5 September 1964
Ship	State	Description
Amonea	Panama	Typhoon Ruby: The cargo ship broke from her moorings in a typhoon at Hong Kong. She collided with other vessels and ras aground on the Datum Rock. She was refloated on 11 October.
Anji	United States	Typhoon Ruby: The Liberty ship was driven ashore at Honk Kong during a typhoon. She was refloated on 24 November and scrapped in March 1965.
Bogota	Hong Kong	Typhoon Ruby: The cargo ship, laid up due to severe damage, was driven ashore on Lantau Island during a typhoon. Further damaged by Typhoon Dot on 13 October, she was refloated on 26 October. Consequently scrapped.
Cosmo Trader	Hong Kong	Typhoon Ruby: The cargo ship was driven ashore on Kau Shau Island, Hong Kong. She was refloated on 4 November but was declared a constructive total loss. She was consequently scrapped.
Dorar	Liberia	Typhoon Ruby: The cargo ship foundered at Hong Kong with the loss of eleven crew.
Southern Paul	United Kingdom	This former coastal minesweeper was acting as a port auxiliary craft in Leith Harbour, South Georgia when she capsized and sank due to the accumulation of snow and ice on deck.
Southern Peter	United Kingdom	This former coastal minesweeper was acting as a port auxiliary craft in Leith Harbour, South Georgia when she capsized and sank due to the accumulation of snow and ice on deck.

=== 6 September ===
List of shipwrecks: 6 September 1964
Ship	State	Description
Leecliffe Hall	Canada	The bulk carrier collided with Apollonia (Greece) and sank with the loss of three crew. Amongst her eight passengers was Maurice Bourget, Speaker of the Senate of Canada. All passengers were rescued.

=== 7 September ===
List of shipwrecks: 7 September 1964
Ship	State	Description
Kirk Maid	Cayman Islands	The cargo ship sprang a leak and sank 4 nautical miles (7.4 km) off Kingston, Jamaica. She was on a voyage from Dominica to Kingston.

=== 11 September ===
List of shipwrecks: 11 September 1964
Ship	State	Description
Globe Explorer	United States	The bulk carrier, a converted T2 tanker, suffered an engine room fire 270 nautical miles (500 km) east of Cape Charles, Virginia and was abandoned by her crew. She was on a voyage from the Hampton Roads, Virginia to Rotterdam, South Holland, Netherlands. She was towed in to the Hampton roads on 16 September. She was repaired in 1965. Her fore part was joined to the stern section of the T2 tanker Appomattox, re-entering service as Globe Explorer. The stern section was joing to the fore section of Appomattox. The ship was renamed Fairwind and sold for scrap.

=== 13 September ===
List of shipwrecks: 13 September 1964
Ship	State	Description
Locks	United States	The 43-gross register ton, 58.7-foot (17.9 m) fishing vessel was lost after she collided with the vessel Fern (United States) at Unalaska in the Aleutian Islands.
Marionga Maris	Panama	The cargo liner ran aground on the Etna Bank, approximately 45 nautical miles (83 km) north of Jakarta, Indonesia. She was on a voyage from Manila, Philippines to a port in Canada. She was refloated and resumed her voyage.

=== 14 September ===
List of shipwrecks: 14 September 1964
Ship	State	Description
Avalon	United States	The barge foundered in a storm off Palos Verdes, California.

=== 17 September ===
List of shipwrecks: 17 September 1964
Ship	State	Description
Penn Carrier	United States	The cargo ship ran aground in the Suez Canal.

=== 18 September ===
List of shipwrecks: 18 September 1964
Ship	State	Description
Trentbank	United Kingdom	The cargo ship collided with Fogo (Portugal) and was flooded.

=== 20 September ===
List of shipwrecks: 20 September 1964
Ship	State	Description
Unidentified tanker	Japan	The tanker collided with the cargo ship Eastern Take (United Kingdom) off Nagoya, Japan, and sank with the loss of seven crew.
Kaptjan Nielsen	Denmark	The dredger capsized and sank at Brisbane, Australia. Seven crew were killed and two reported as missing.

=== 25 September ===
List of shipwrecks: 25 September 1964
Ship	State	Description
Adri XIV	Indonesia	Typhoon Wilda: The cargo ship capsized and sank at Kobe, Japan in a typhoon. Subsequently refloated and laid up at Nadahama, after which no further trace.
Oriental	United Kingdom	Typhoon Wilda: The cargo ship was driven aground at Satsuma, Kagoshima, Japan during a typhoon. All crew were rescued.

=== 29 September ===
List of shipwrecks: 29 September 1964
Ship	State	Description
Livanita	Norway	The bulk carrier ran aground in the Clyde at Scotstoun, Glasgow, United Kingdom. Refloated on 6 October.
Sycamore Hill	United Kingdom	The cargo ship ran aground in the Bosporus, Turkey. Refloated 2 October.

=== 30 September ===
List of shipwrecks: 30 September 1964
Ship	State	Description
Spray	United States	The 8-gross register ton, 31.2-foot (9.5 m) fishing vessel was destroyed by fire at Juneau, Alaska.

=== Unknown date ===
List of shipwrecks: Unknown date 1964
Ship	State	Description
Tosha	United States	The 13-gross register ton, 35.5-foot (10.8 m) fishing vessel was destroyed by fire on the Copper River Flats near Cordova, Alaska.

== October ==
=== 7 October ===
List of shipwrecks: 7 October 1964
Ship	State	Description
USS Barbero	United States Navy	The decommissioned Balao-class guided-missile submarine was sunk as a target in the Pacific Ocean off Pearl Harbor, Hawaii, by the submarine USS Greenfish (United States Navy).

=== 8 October ===
List of shipwrecks: 8 October 1964
Ship	State	Description
Capraay	Sweden	The fishing vessel caught fire and sank in the North Sea. Her crew were rescued by another Swedish fishing vessel.
Erato	West Germany	The cargo ship caught fire at Detroit, Michigan, United States. Two of her crew were killed.

=== 9 October ===
List of shipwrecks: 9 October 1964
Ship	State	Description
Hecta I	Cuba	The fishing vessel was sunk by a Cuban exile-operated speedboat.

=== 12 October ===
List of shipwrecks: 12 October 1964
Ship	State	Description
Stefanios	Greece	The Liberty ship ran aground on the Atlantic coast of Spain just outside the Strait of Gibraltar at 36°01′N 5°43′W. She was later refloated and towed to Gibraltar, where she was declared a constructive total loss. She subsequently was scrapped.

=== 14 October ===
List of shipwrecks: 14 October 1964
Ship	State	Description
Amonea	Panama	Typhoon Dot: The cargo ship was driven ashore in a typhoon at Hong Kong. She was declared a total loss.
Borus	United Kingdom	Typhoon Dot: The tanker, awaiting scrapping, sank in a typhoon at Hong Kong. Subsequently refloated and scrapped.
Dia	Panama	The cargo ship developed a leak and sank south of Savona, Italy (44°12′N 08°38′E). She was on a voyage from Antwerp, Belgium to Bourgas, Bulgaria.
Doris	Netherlands	The cargo ship was driven ashore in a storm at Naples, Italy. She capsized and sank.

=== 15 October ===
List of shipwrecks: 15 October 1964
Ship	State	Description
Famous	United States	The motor vessel sank in Frederick Sound in the Alexander Archipelago in Southeast Alaska.

=== 18 October ===
List of shipwrecks: 18 October 1964
Ship	State	Description
Tulipan	Spain	The cargo ship ran aground on the Monach Islands, Outer Hebrides, United Kingdom. Thirteen of her fourteen crew were rescued by a Royal Air Force helicopter.

=== 20 October ===
List of shipwrecks: 20 October 1964
Ship	State	Description
Navarchos Koundouriotis	Greece	The Liberty ship ran aground on a sandbar at Mar del Plata, Argentina, near the port's entrance. The freighter was on a voyage from Mar del Plata to Marseille, Bouches-du-Rhône, France. She broke in two and was declared a constructive total loss; consequently scrapped.

=== 22 October ===
List of shipwrecks: 22 October 1964
Ship	State	Description
Radio	United States	The 13-gross register ton, 35.3-foot (10.8 m) fishing vessel was destroyed by fire at Hoonah, Alaska.

=== 25 October ===
List of shipwrecks: 25 October 1964
Ship	State	Description
Capetan Vanghelis	Liberia	The cargo ship ran aground on the Goodwin Sands, Kent, United Kingdom. Refloated after six hours by a tug and the Ramsgate lifeboat.

=== 26 October ===
List of shipwrecks: 26 October 1964
Ship	State	Description
Paul L	United States	During a voyage from Aberdeen, Washington, to Kodiak, Alaska, via Ketchikan, Alaska, the 65-gross register ton, 65.4-foot (19.9 m) fishing vessel was wrecked during a storm near the mouth of the Italio River (59°19′40″N 139°14′30″W) 40 nautical miles (74 km; 46 mi) southeast of Yakutat, Alaska. All four members of her crew lost their lives.

=== 27 October ===
List of shipwrecks: 27 October 1964
Ship	State	Description
Charles A. Dunning	Canada	The vessel sank at 46°30′N 61°40′W after breaking its tow from Pictou, Nova Scotia to the scrapyard at Sydney, Nova Scotia.

=== 28 October ===
List of shipwrecks: 28 October 1964
Ship	State	Description
Magdeburg	West Germany	Sank after a collision with Yamashiro Maru (Japan), off Broadness Point, Northfleet, Kent. Later raised and sold, but sank whilst under tow in Bay of Biscay whilst being delivered to her new Greek owners.

=== 29 October ===
List of shipwrecks: 29 October 1964
Ship	State	Description
Tjokroaminoto	Indonesia	Tjokroaminoto in port of Amsterdam The cargo ship sank in Amsterdam Harbour, Netherlands after her cargo of copra caught fire.

== November ==
=== 1 November ===
List of shipwrecks: 1 November 1964
Ship	State	Description
A P S Co. No. 10	United States	The 42-gross register ton, 60.1-foot (18.3 m) barge was destroyed by fire at Sand Point, Alaska.

=== 11 November ===
List of shipwrecks: 11 November 1964
Ship	State	Description
Comet	United States	The 36-gross register ton, 47.9-foot (14.6 m) fishing vessel was wrecked at Shaft Rock (55°27′15″N 133°19′10″W) off Noyes Island in the Alexander Archipelago in Southeast Alaska.
Macedon	Greece	The cargo ship ran aground at Ras Beirut, Lebanon and broke in three. She was on a voyage from Houston, Texas, United States to Bombay, India. She sank on 21 November.

=== 15 November ===
List of shipwrecks: 15 November 1964
Ship	State	Description
Archangelos	Liberia	The Liberty ship sprang a leak and foundered in the Pacific Ocean off Baja California, Mexico. (24°10′N 111°50′W). She was on a voyage from Philadelphia, Pennsylvania, United States to Tokyo, Japan.
Marnic	Liberia	The Liberty ship ran aground at San Salvador, Bahamas. She was on a voyage from Maracaibo, Venezuela to New York, United States. She was later refloated but declared a constructive total loss.

=== 17 November ===
List of shipwrecks: 17 November 1964
Ship	State	Description
Clydefield	United Kingdom	The tanker was severely damaged by fire at Cutuco, El Salvador. She was consequently scrapped.

=== 18 November ===
List of shipwrecks: 18 November 1961
Ship	State	Description
Kali L.	Liberia	The Liberty ship ran aground at Nojima Saki, Japan (34°53′N 139°50′E). She was on a voyage from Iloilo, Philippines to New Orleans, Louisiana, United States. She was refloated on 14 December and towed in to Yokosuka, Japan. Declared a constructive total loss, she was scrapped there in March 1965.

=== 20 November ===
List of shipwrecks: 20 November 1964
Ship	State	Description
Pompadour	Panama	The cargo ship ran aground in the South China Sea, some 70 nautical miles (130 km) west of Palawan, Philippines. Salvonia (United Kingdom) sent to her rescue, but also ran aground whilst towing Pompadour. Both crews rescued by HMS Zest (Royal Navy).

=== 23 November ===
List of shipwrecks: 23 November 1964
Ship	State	Description
Virginia E	United States	The 70 GRT, 68.7-foot (20.9 m) fishing vessel burned at King Cove, Alaska.

=== 24 November ===
List of shipwrecks: 24 November 1964
Ship	State	Description
USS Sea Devil	United States Navy	The decommissioned Balao-class auxiliary submarine was sunk as a target in the Pacific Ocean off Southern California.

=== 26 November ===
List of shipwrecks: 26 November 1964
Ship	State	Description
Stolt Dagali	Norway	The edible products tanker was cut in half in a collision with the ocean liner/cruise ship Shalom (Israel) in the Atlantic Ocean 50 nautical miles (93 km) from New York City, killing 19 of her 44 crew members. Her stern section sank, but her bow section remained afloat.

=== 29 November ===
List of shipwrecks: 29 November 1964
Ship	State	Description
Agios Nikolaos Y	Greece	The cargo ship exploded and sank off Peniche, Portugal. Crew rescued by the tanker Fogo (Portugal).

=== Unknown date ===
List of shipwrecks: Unknown date in November 1964
Ship	State	Description
Meracoulosa	Liberia	The T2 tanker collided with Del Sol (United States) at Port Arthur, Texas, United States and was damaged.
Meracoulosa	Liberia	The T2 tanker collided with Torvanger (Norway in the Sabine Pass. She ran aground and was further damaged.

== December ==
=== 1 December ===
List of shipwrecks: 1 December 1964
Ship	State	Description
Fury	Panama	The cargo ship was driven ashore at Wedge Island, Nova Scotia, Canada in a storm. She was declared a constructive total loss.

=== 2 December ===
List of shipwrecks: 2 December 1964
Ship	State	Description
Acadia Seahawk	Canada	The 124.58-foot (37.97 m) trawler sank in a storm with all 14 hands. She was last reported at (43°30′N 61°10′W) southwest of Sable Island.

=== 3 December ===
List of shipwrecks: 3 December 1964
Ship	State	Description
Union Pacific	United Kingdom	The cargo ship ran aground off Naha, Japan. She was on a voyage from Mormugao, India to Osaka, Japan. She was declared a constructive total loss.

=== 7 December ===
List of shipwrecks: 7 December 1964
Ship	State	Description
Scantic	Denmark	The cargo ship foundered in Saint George's Channel (51°10′N 7°15′W. She was on a voyage from Preston, Lancashire to Goole, Yorkshire, United Kingdom

=== 11 December ===
List of shipwrecks: 11 December 1946
Ship	State	Description
Meracoulosa	Liberia	The T2 tanker was severely damaged by weather, with all bulkheads and her bottom plating fractured. She was on a voyage from Beaumont, Texas, United States to Karachi, Pakistan.

=== 12 December ===
List of shipwrecks: 12 December 1964
Ship	State	Description
Deutschland	West Germany	The coaster collided with Vera (Norway) in the Lower Elbe and sank with the loss of four crew.
Fury	Canada	The cargo ship lost her steering gear and was driven ashore at Canso, Nova Scotia.
Yewcroft	United Kingdom	The cargo ship ran aground at IJmuiden, Netherlands.

=== 13 December ===
List of shipwrecks: 13 December 1964
Ship	State	Description
Tjoba	Netherlands	The coaster capsized and sank in the Rhine at Sankt Goar, West Germany. The ship was raised after eight days when it was discovered that the ship's cat had survived in an air pocket. He was taken to a vet in Koblenz for treatment.

=== 14 December ===
List of shipwrecks: 14 December 1964
Ship	State	Description
Golfo di Trieste	Italy	The Liberty ship sprang a leak and sank in the Pacific Ocean (11°10′N 112°31′E).

=== 17 December ===
List of shipwrecks: 17 December 1964
Ship	State	Description
North Wind	United States	The 32-gross register ton, 50.1-foot (15.3 m) tug sank about 5 nautical miles (9.3 km; 5.8 mi) east of Cape Spencer, Alaska.
San Patrick	Liberia	During a voyage from Vancouver, British Columbia, Canada, to Yokohama, Japan, the 521-foot (159 m) bulk carrier, a converted T2 tanker, was wrecked on Ulak Island in the western Aleutian Islands and broke up on rocks in heavy surf with the loss of her entire crew of 32, all of whom were from northwestern Spain.

=== 22 December ===
List of shipwrecks: 22 December 1964
Ship	State	Description
North Wind	Denmark	The coaster was driven ashore at Preston, Devon, United Kingdom. Crew rescued by breeches buoy.

=== 23 December ===
List of shipwrecks: 23 December 1964
Ship	State	Description
HMCyS Vijaya	Royal Ceylon Navy	The Algerine-class minesweeper ran aground during a cyclone in the Gulf of Mannar.

=== 24 December ===
List of shipwrecks: 24 December 1964
Ship	State	Description
Athenoula T	Liberia	The Liberty ship ran aground at Hook of Holland, South Holland, Netherlands. Later refloated, she was declared a constructive total loss.

=== 25 December ===
List of shipwrecks: 25 December 1964
Ship	State	Description
Smith Voyager	United States	The cargo sank under tow in the South Atlantic. She had been disabled on 21 December following a shift in her cargo of grain. She foundered due to the rupturing of a seam. Four crew drowned, the remaining crew were rescued by a United States Coast Guard cutter.

=== 26 December ===
List of shipwrecks: 26 December 1964
Ship	State	Description
Albinp	Philippines	The trawler sank in the South China Sea 150 nautical miles (280 km) north west of Luzon. Her crew were rescued by the trawler Eduardo (Philippines).
Arturo	Philippines	The trawker sank in the South China Sea 150 nautical miles (280 km) north west of Luzon. Her crew were rescued by the trawler Eduardo (Philippines).
Fuel tide	Greece	The fuel hulk was driven ashore at Skaramangas. She was later refloated.

=== 28 December ===
List of shipwrecks: 28 December 1964
Ship	State	Description
Southbank	United Kingdom	The cargo ship ran aground off Washington Island, Kiribati and broke in two. The crew abandoned ship but returned later when the second mate was drowned and two injured. USCGC Winnebago (United States Coast Guard) was sent to her aid. Winnebago rescued 103 passengers and crew the next day.

=== Unknown date ===
List of shipwrecks: Unknown date 1964
Ship	State	Description
El Firma	United States	The 8-gross register ton, 31.3-foot (9.5 m) fishing vessel sank at Cordova, Alaska.

== Unknown date ==
List of shipwrecks: Unknown date 1964
Ship	State	Description
Betty S	United States	The 12-gross register ton, 38.6-foot (11.8 m) fishing vessel sank off Ketchikan, Alaska.
Margin	United Kingdom	The coaster ran aground at Port Elizabeth, South Africa, subsequently scrapped.
Saint Anna	United States	The 26-gross register ton, 48-foot (14.6 m) fishing vessel was reported in 1964 to have been lost after striking a rock in Johnson Cove (56°05′55″N 132°41′20″W) near Lincoln Rock (56.0569°N 132.6958°W) in Southeast Alaska. The report does not provide a date for the sinking or specify the year in which it occurred.
Thorium	United Kingdom	The ICI coaster ran aground on Knot Spit, Lancashire in 1964 and was refloated six days later.
