= Southern Pride =

British whaling ship

- Southern Pride, after Royal Navy conversion.

History
- Name: Southern Pride,
- Owner: Southern Whaling and Sealing Company, London (1936–1940), Admiralty (1940–44)
- Builder: Smiths Dock Company
- Launched: 1936
- In service: 1936–1944
- Fate: Wrecked near Freetown, 16 June 1944

General characteristics
- Tonnage: 582 GRT
- Length: 160 ft (49 m)
- Installed power: Steam
- Speed: 15.25 knots (28.24 km/h; 17.55 mph)
- Crew: 30

Southern Pride was a steam-powered whaler built by the Smiths Dock Company of Middlesbrough, North Yorkshire, England, in 1936. She was the initial design inspiration for the Flower-class corvettes used to escort convoys in the North Atlantic in World War II. The final design for the Flower class was significantly modified from that of Southern Pride factoring in things like ease of construction.

After World War II began Southern Pride was requisitioned by the Royal Navy, and converted into a warship. Her conversion took six weeks and cost 75,000 pounds. She was wrecked off Freetown in June 1944.
