= HMSAS Parktown (T39) =

South African Navy minesweeping whaler

History

South Africa
- Name: Southern Sky
- Owner: Southern Whaling and Sealing Company, London
- Builder: Smiths Dock & Co Ltd, Middlesbrough
- Launched: 1929
- Home port: Cape Town
- Fate: Sold in 1936

South Africa
- Name: Sidney Smith
- Owner: Union Sealing and Whaling Company, Durban
- Home port: Durban, South Africa
- Fate: Requisitioned on 8 August 1940

South Africa
- Name: HMSAS Parktown
- Namesake: Parktown, Johannesburg, South Africa
- Owner: South African Naval Forces
- Home port: Simon's Town
- Identification: Pennant number: T39
- Honors and awards: South African Waters 1939–1945 (Note: For operations within a radius of 1000 nautical miles of the South African Coast, including South West Africa.); Libya 1940–1942 (Note: For operations inshore, between Port Said and Benghazi.); Mediterranean 1940–1945 (Note: For operations in the whole of the Mediterranean, the western limit being a line joining Cape Spartel and Cape Trafalgar.)
- Fate: Sunk by German E-boats off Tobruk on 21 June 1942

General characteristics
- Type: Minesweeping whaler
- Displacement: 250 tons standard
- Length: 35.36 m (116.0 ft)
- Beam: 7.38 m (24.2 ft)
- Draught: 3.87 m (12.7 ft)
- Propulsion: One coal-fired 3-cylinder triple-expansion reciprocating engine
- Speed: 12 kts maximum
- Armament: 1 × Oerlikon 20 mm cannon; 1 × Quadruple 12.7mm Vickers; LL magnetic sweep

HMSAS Parktown was a minesweeping whaler of the South African Naval Services that was sunk during the Second World War. She was built as the whaler Southern Sky for the Southern Whaling and Sealing Company in 1929 and sold in 1936 to the Union Whaling Company, acquiring the new name Sidney Smith. She was requisitioned on 8 August 1940 as HMSAS Parktown and was converted to sweep magnetic mines. She arrived at Tobruk on 10 June 1942 just in time to take part in the evacuation of Allied forces. She was the last ship to leave Tobruk harbour prior to its capitulation to German forces on 20 June 1942. Parktown embarked 60 troops and took a tug in tow outside the harbour. Her reduced speed led to her being attacked by German E-boats, most probably German E-boats from Derna. Gunfire from the motor boats destroyed the bridge, ruptured the boiler, killed or wounded half of the men on board and led to on-board ammunition exploding, causing her to finally stop moving and setting the ship on fire. She was finally sunk on the evening of 21 June 1942 by an Allied MTB which had arrived to pick up survivors.

== Civilian career ==
The Southern Whaling and Sealing Company of London ordered the laying down of two additional ships for their operations in South Africa in 1929. The order was placed with Smiths Dock Company of Middlesbrough and was for two whalers, to be named Southern Sun and Southern Sky, both of which to be registered in Cape Town. The ships were laid down and launched in 1929. In 1936, both ships were bought by the Union Whaling Company and registered in Durban as Albert Hulett and Sidney Smith respectively. Both ships were used for whaling in the Southern Ocean and Antarctic until 1940.

After the outbreak of World War II, the South African Naval Service was tasked with ensuring free access to the main South African ports (Note: Walvis Bay, Saldanah Bay, Cape Town, Port Elizabeth, East London and Durban.) for Allied ships passing the Cape. The absence of naval minesweepers lead to a program of requisitioning civilian ships and converting them to this role. Albert Hulett and Sidney Smith were requisitioned on 8 August 1940 with Albert Hulett being re-named HMSAS Langlaagte and Sidney Smith as HMSAS Parktown after the Johannesburg suburb of Parktown.

== Naval Service ==
=== Re-fit and Initial Service ===
Both Langlaagte and Parktown were both found to be in a very poor state of repair after their extended use in the Southern Ocean and long periods away from proper maintenance facilities, and were therefore unsuitable for conversion to conventional minesweepers. It was decided to convert them into magnetic minesweepers deploying the LL magnetic sweep, an arrangement of two buoyant cables equipped at the end with electrodes and powered by a 35 kW generator pulsing 3000 amps for 5 seconds each minute. The conversion was completed at Cape Town in February 1941. Parktown sailed in company with Langlaagte from Cape Town for the Mediterranean in April 1942 to join the 167th Minesweeping Group working from Alexandria, Egypt.

=== Mediterranean ===
On 10 June 1942, Parktown arrived in Tobruk Harbour from Alexandria for magnetic minesweeping duties. During the passage she had rescued survivors of two Allied vessels which had been torpedoed off Mersa Matruh. For ten days she continued minesweeping operations off the harbour while the 8th Army were being driven back by advancing German and Italian forces.

=== Sinking off Tobruk ===
On 20 June 1942 General Rommel's Deutsch-Italienische Panzerarmee attacked the Tobruk garrison from the south and south east. By 18:00, the German and Italian forces had overrun the main defence lines and were closing on the harbour and all Allied ships were ordered to embark personnel for evacuation.

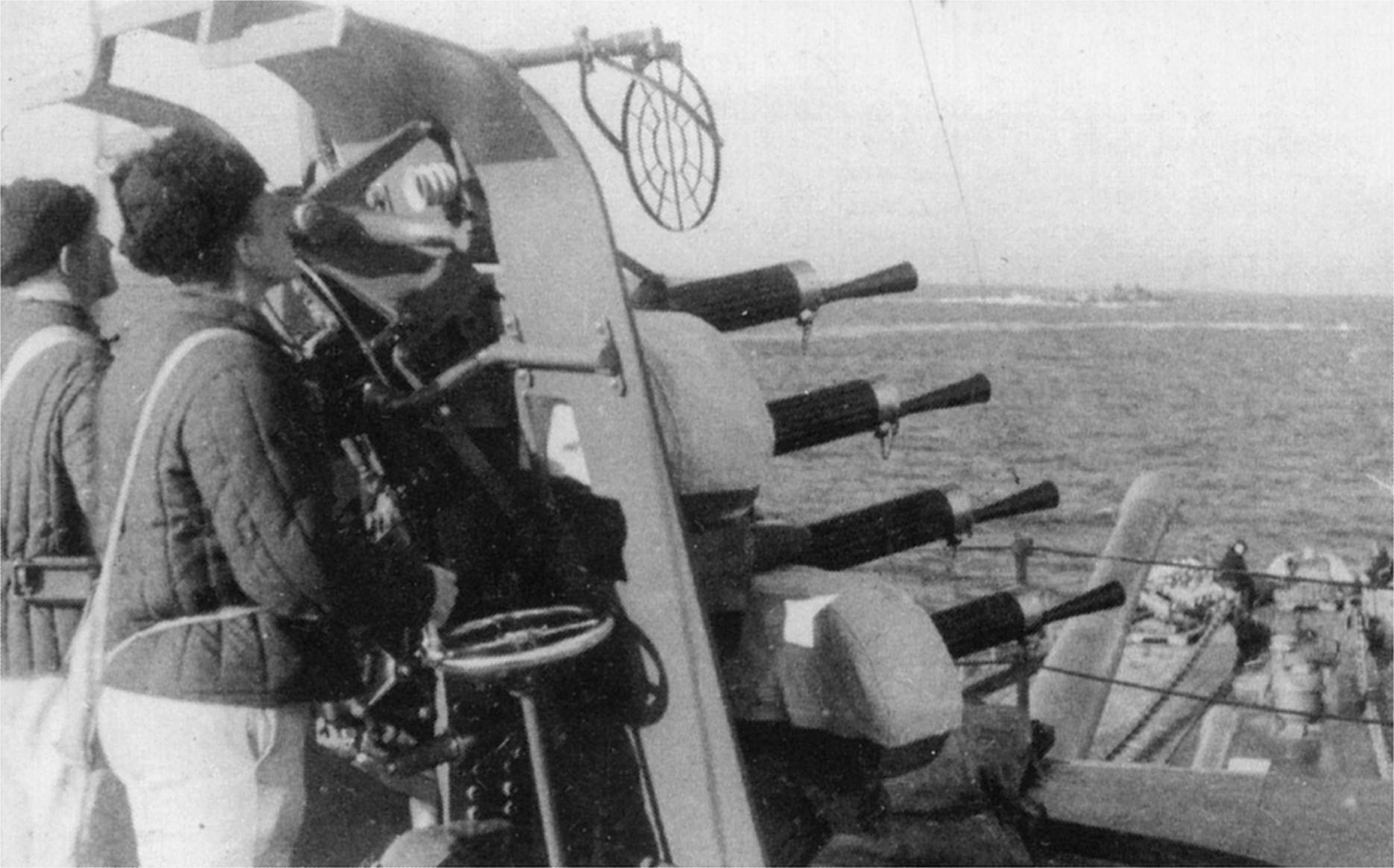
4-barrel 12,7 mm Vickers naval anti-aircraft mounting as carried by HMSAS Parktown (seen here in Soviet use)

By 19:00 German tanks and armoured cars were within the town and started shelling the ships in the harbour. HMSAS Bever received a direct hit as she cast off and as Parktown left the pier, she received small arms fire from German infantry on the jetty. She was also hit by shell-fire from an approaching tank. Under cover of a smoke screen laid by a motor torpedo boat, but still receiving shell-fire from the town, the two ships left the harbour for the open sea. During the night Parktown and Bever became separated. (Note: HMSAS Bever reached Mersa Matruh the next morning (21 June 1942)) Parktown had taken a small tug filled with evacuated soldiers in tow during the night and had slowed to a speed of 5 knots (9.3 km/h). At 06:45 on 21 June, Parktown's crew sighted what they believed was an Italian "MAS" torpedo boat, which had been directed to the slow moving vessel by a German reconnaissance aircraft. According to German reports, Parktown was actually engaged by a flotilla of German E-boats based at Derna. Within 30 minutes, more torpedo boats closed and opened fire. Defending herself with a single Oerlikon and anti-aircraft machine-guns, Parktown was out-numbered and out-gunned by the axis vessels. A direct hit to the bridge killed the captain, Lieutenant (SAN) Leslie John Jagger, as well as the coxswain. Within 15 minutes Parktown was stationary with a hole in the boiler, half of the crew and evacuated soldiers as casualties, out of ammunition and with the upper deck on fire.

The remaining crew and soldiers abandoned ship and clung to carley floats. At this time, an aircraft drove off the hostile ships. The tug which had been in tow had not been engaged by the E-boats and managed to rescue some of the survivors and some of the remaining survivors were rescued by an Allied Motor Torpedo Boat (MTB) which found them close to the burning minesweeper. The MTB then sank the burning wreck of the Parktown with depth charges before returning to Mersa Matruh that evening.

Accounts on the final hours of the Parktown differ:

- Orpen states that the Italian ships were driven off by a South African aircraft. He also records there being four Italian torpedo boats involved in the action.
- Du Toit states that there were six Italian torpedo boats involved and that the aircraft was in fact a German aircraft which erroneously attacked the Italian ships.
- Harris supports the fact that there were four torpedo boats and states that the German aircraft deliberately attacked the Italian vessels as they were firing on survivors in the water.

== Legacy ==
Parktown's commanding officer, Lieutenant Leslie James Jagger was posthumously Mentioned in Despatches for his conduct during the ship's final hours. The name was used for another HMSAS Parktown, formerly MV Suderoy, requisitioned from Suderoy Whaling Company on 3 July 1941.
