= List of shipwrecks in 1961 =

The list of shipwrecks in 1961 includes ships sunk, foundered, grounded, or otherwise lost during 1961.

table of contents
1961
Jan	Feb	Mar	Apr
May	Jun	Jul	Aug
Sep	Oct	Nov	Dec
Unknown date

== January ==
=== 1 January ===
List of shipwrecks: 1 January 1961
Ship	State	Description
Sadie	United States	The 10-gross register ton, 34.8-foot (10.6 m) fishing vessel sank at Tee Harbor (also known as "The Harbor"), Alaska.

=== 3 January ===
List of shipwrecks: 3 January 1961
Ship	State	Description
Indian Navigator	India	The cargo ship sank 60 nautical miles (110 km) off the Isles of Scilly. Thirteen crew of Indian Success (India) that were put on board to salvage the ship after it caught fire were lost. One of her 67 crew was also reported lost.

=== 5 January ===
List of shipwrecks: 5 January 1961
Ship	State	Description
Arcadia	United Kingdom	The ocean liner ran aground off Honolulu, Hawaii, United States. Refloated after two hours.
Harry R. Jones	United States	The cargo ship ran aground off Ardrossan, Ayrshire, Scotland whilst under tow to Troon for scrapping.

=== 9 January ===
List of shipwrecks: 9 January 1961
Ship	State	Description
El Pensativo	Cuba	The motor sailer was intercepted and sunk at sea by an armed boat. Four Cuban intelligence agents were killed.

=== 10 January ===
List of shipwrecks: 10 January 1961
Ship	State	Description
Egoz	Israel	The passenger ship foundered in the Mediterranean Sea with the loss of 46 of the 49 people on board. She was on a voyage from Al Hoceima, Morocco to Gibraltar.

=== 11 January ===
List of shipwrecks: 12 January 1961
Ship	State	Description
HDMS Egenæs	Royal Danish Navy	The patrol vessel ran aground off Odden. She was consequently scrapped.
Vega	United States	While under tow from New York City to Jacksonville, Florida, the 75-foot (22.9 m) motor automobile ferry capsized and sank without loss of life in 55 feet (17 m) of water in the North Atlantic Ocean off Avon-by-the-Sea, New Jersey, at 40°11.646′N 073°56.787′W after her tow line parted during a storm.

=== 12 January ===
List of shipwrecks: 12 January 1961
Ship	State	Description
HMS Oberon	Royal Navy	The Oberon-class submarine ran aground at Rothesay Bay in the Firth of Clyde. Refloated the next day with the assistance of three tugs and two boom defence vessels.
USCGC Triumph	United States Coast Guard	The motor lifeboat sank in the Pacific Ocean off the coast of Oregon during a rescue with the loss of five of her six crew members.

=== 17 January ===
List of shipwrecks: 17 January 1961
Ship	State	Description
SSAFA	United Kingdom	The 137-foot (42 m) fishing vessel stranded on rocks in heavy weather/gale in Friesland Bay, Coll, Inner Hebrides. Crew taken off by Coll livesaving team. Refloated 18 April and taken to Tobermory and beached, later refloated, repaired, and returned to service.

=== 18 January ===
List of shipwrecks: 18 January 1961
Ship	State	Description
Oco	United Kingdom	The TID-class tug collided with Henfield (United Kingdom) in the River Ouse at Swinefleet, Yorkshire. Oco capsized and sank. She was towing barges from Hull to Selby. She was refloated on 1 February and beached, the refloated on 14 February and taken in to Goole. Subsequently repaired and returned to service as Selby Olympia.

=== 20 January ===
List of shipwrecks: 20 January 1961
Ship	State	Description
Caribbean Queen	United Kingdom	The cargo ship sank between Cuba and Florida, United States. All crew rescued.

=== 21 January ===
List of shipwrecks: 21 January 1961
Ship	State	Description
Yewmount	United Kingdom	The coaster collided with Stamatios M. Embiricos (Greece) and sank. She was on a voyage from Liverpool, Lancashire to Glasgow, Renfrewshire. Yewmount was refloated on 30 March 1961 and was scrapped in 1964.

=== 25 January ===
List of shipwrecks: 25 January 1961
Ship	State	Description
Yarasli	Turkey	The cargo ship was sighted off Cephalonia, Greece whilst on a voyage from Istanbul to Bagnoli, Italy. No further trace, presumed foundered with the loss of all hands.

=== 26 January ===
List of shipwrecks: 26 January 1961
Ship	State	Description
S-80	Soviet Navy	The Whiskey-class submarine sank in the Barents Sea with the loss of her entire crew of 68. Her wreck remained undiscovered until 23 June 1968.
Vrmac	Yugoslavia	The cargo ship capsized and sank off Venice, Italy with the loss of five of her 22 crew.

=== Unknown date ===
List of shipwrecks: Unknown date January 1961
Ship	State	Description
Yarasli	Turkey	The coaster foundered in the Ionian Sea. She was last heard from on 25 January.

== February ==
=== 3 February ===
List of shipwrecks: 3 February 1961
Ship	State	Description
De Vilhena	Malta	The tug foundered 40 nautical miles (74 km) north west of Calvi, Corsica, France.

=== 5 February ===
List of shipwrecks: 5 February 1961
Ship	State	Description
Kupreanoff	United States	The 10-gross register ton motor vessel sank at Port Williams (58°29′30″N 152°35′00″W) on the southern coast of Afognak Island in Alaska's Kodiak Archipelago.

=== 8 February ===
List of shipwrecks: 8 February 1961
Ship	State	Description
Braga	Norway	The cargo ship foundered in the English Channel. All 27 crew and both passengers rescued by the tug Rennes and cargo ship Banora (both France) and landed at Newhaven, Sussex or Dieppe, France respectively.

=== 17 February ===
List of shipwrecks: 17 February 1961
Ship	State	Description
BP Explorer	United Kingdom	The coastal tanker capsized and sank in the River Severn at Awre, Gloucestershire with the loss of all five crew.
C 632	Royal Maritime Auxiliary Service	The auxiliary vessel ran aground at Dungeness, Kent and was holed. A pump was put on board and the ship was escorted to Dover.
Eminence	United Kingdom	The coaster collided with American Farmer (United States) off Thames Haven, Essex and was holed, with her steering gear destroyed.
ex-USS Huron	Canada	The former armored cruiser USS South Dakota (later renamed USS Huron) (United States Navy), sank in 80 feet (24 m) of water at Powell River Breakwater in the Powell River, British Columbia, Canada, due to flooding of her hull during a storm.
Parcorali	Liberia	The cargo ship ran aground on the Rosslyn Rock whilst on a voyage from Bangkok, Thailand, to Japan. She was refloated the next day but was consequently declared a constructive total loss and scrapped.

=== 19 February ===
List of shipwrecks: 19 February 1961
Ship	State	Description
Petromar Buenos Aires	Argentina	The tanker collided with Pennsylvania (Denmark) in the Paraná River 217 kilometres (135 mi) from river mouth. The ship and caught fire and was declared a constructive total loss.
Lapwing	United Kingdom	The coastal tanker capsized in the River Humber with the loss of three lives.
Runic	United Kingdom	The cargo ship ran aground on Middleton Rock, 400 nautical miles (740 km) north west of Sydney, Australia. Her crew were rescued by Arabic (United Kingdom). Declared a constructive total loss in March 1961.
Scaldis	Belgium	The tug capsized and sank at the mouth of the Scheldt. Two of the fourteen crew were reported missing.

=== 20 February ===
List of shipwrecks: 20 February 1961
Ship	State	Description
Hilda Garston	United States	The 86-foot (26 m), 159-gross register ton scallop-fishing dragger struck a reef and sank without loss of life in up to 45 feet (14 m) of water in Buzzards Bay off Gooseberry Neck, Westport, Massachusetts, 1 nautical mile (1.9 km) south of Old Cock Rock at 41°16.4′N 071°02.1′W.

=== 26 February ===
List of shipwrecks: 26 February 1961
Ship	State	Description
Yoshiura Maru No. 5	Japan	The cargo ship sank southeast of Hong Kong. All 15 crew were rescued.

=== Unknown date ===
List of shipwrecks: Unknown date
Ship	State	Description
Parks No. 11	United States	The 12-gross register ton, 31.2-foot (9.5 m) fishing vessel was wrecked on Sitkalidak Island in the Kodiak Archipelago.

== March ==
=== 1 March ===
List of shipwrecks: 1 March 1961
Ship	State	Description
Western	United States	The 25-gross register ton, 41.5-foot (12.6 m) fishing vessel sank near Russian Harbor (56°44′N 154°05′W) at the southern end of Kodiak Island, Alaska.

=== 10 March ===
List of shipwrecks: 01 March 1961
Ship	State	Description
Invertay	United Kingdom	The 120.2-foot (36.6 m), 229.89-ton trawler was sunk in a collision with trawler Franz Schau (West Germany) in thick fog 190 miles (310 km) off the Humber in the North Sea (55°11′N 05°10′E). The crew was rescued from life rafts by the trawler Grundmann (West Germany)

=== 11 March ===
List of shipwrecks: 11 March 1961
Ship	State	Description
Newfoundland	United Kingdom	The ocean liner ran aground off Argentia, Newfoundland and Labrador, Canada. Refloated after six hours.
Tundra	United States	The 13-gross register ton, 36.9-foot (11.2 m) fishing vessel was destroyed by fire at Seward, Alaska.

=== 13 March ===
List of shipwrecks: 13 March 1961
Ship	State	Description
Dominator	Panama	Dominator in May 1965 The Liberty ship ran aground off California, United States in dense fog and was wrecked, breaking in half. All 31 crew were rescued.

=== 15 March ===
List of shipwrecks: 15 March 1961
Ship	State	Description
Nicolaos Epiphaniades	Greece	The Liberty ship caught fire, exploded and ran aground at Odesa, Soviet Union. She was refloated in October and detained by Soviet authorities seeking recompense for damage caused to port facilities. Reported to have been scrapped in September 1964.

=== 16 March ===
List of shipwrecks: 16 March 1961
Ship	State	Description
Lizzonia	United Kingdom	The Channel tanker collided with Arctic Ocean (Sweden) and sank in the English Channel 3 nautical miles (5.6 km) west north west of the Varne Lightvessel ( Trinity House). Lizzonia was on a voyage from Antwerp, Belgium to Plymouth, Devon.
Martin Lutjens	West Germany	The coaster collided with Schelde Lloyd (Netherlands) off the coast of the Netherlands and sank. All crew were rescued.

=== 17 March ===
List of shipwrecks: 17 March 1961
Ship	State	Description
Arietta	Greece	The cargo ship ran aground near Novorossiysk, Soviet Union. She was on a voyage from Novorossiysk to Liverpool, Lancashire, United Kingdom. She was refloated on 1 April and towed in to Novorossiysk, where she was declared a constructive total loss.

=== 19 March ===
List of shipwrecks: 19 March 1961
Ship	State	Description
Verao	Fiji	The cargo ship foundered off the coast of Queensland, Australia. All fifteen crew rescued by Iron Flinders (Australia).

=== 21 March ===
List of shipwrecks: 21 March 1961
Ship	State	Description
Mary P Cooper	United Kingdom	The cargo ship collided with the coaster Foamville and sank in the Manchester Ship Canal, blocking it completely. All eight crew were rescued.

=== 22 March ===
List of shipwrecks: 22 March 1961
Ship	State	Description
Chresten	Denmark	The CHANT struck a submerged object and sank near Stubbekøbing. She was on a voyage from Nyborg to Copenhagen. She was refloated on 16 May and taken in to Copenhagen, but was declared a constructive total loss and consequently scrapped.
Mary P. Cooper	United Kingdom	The sand hopper collided with another vessel and sank in the Manchester Ship Canal.

== April ==
=== 3 April ===
List of shipwrecks: 3 April 1961
Ship	State	Description
Clupea	Norway	The factory ship, a converted tank landing ship, caught fire at Port Étienne, Mauritania. The fire was extinguished.

=== 5 April ===
List of shipwrecks: 5 April 1961
Ship	State	Description
Kwang Lung	United States	The T1 tanker suffered an engine room explosion at Kaohsiung, Taiwan and caught fire. She was towed out of port and beached. She was refloated on 9 May.

=== 6 April ===
List of shipwrecks: 3 April 1961
Ship	State	Description
Clupea	Norway	The factory ship, a converted tank landing ship, caught fire at Port Étienne, Mauritania. She sank on 8 April (at 20°53′N 17°03′W) with her superstructure above water. The fire was extinguished on 14 April. She was a total loss.

=== 8 April ===
List of shipwrecks: 8 April 1961
Ship	State	Description
Dara	United Kingdom	The passenger ship suffered an onboard explosion and fire off Dubai, with 238 of the 819 people on board killed. The ship was taken under tow, but sank on 10 April.

=== 14 April ===
List of shipwrecks: 14 April 1961
Ship	State	Description
Marine Merchant	Greece	The bulk carrier, a converted Liberty ship, broke in two and sank in the Atlantic Ocean 40 nautical miles (74 km) south east of Portland, Maine, United States.
Theia Maria	Greece	The Liberty ship ran aground near Punta Galera, Mexico (15°53′N 97°46′W) and broke in two. She was scrapped in situ.

=== 16 April ===
List of shipwrecks: 16 April 1961
Ship	State	Description
USS Baldwin	United States Navy	Baldwin (extreme right) being refloated on 28 April 1961 While under tow, the decommissioned Gleaves-class destroyer ran aground two nautical miles (3.7 km; 2.3 mi) southwest of Montauk Point, Long Island, New York, when her tow line parted. She was later refloated and scuttled.
Comedian	United States	The 12-gross register ton, 38.5-foot (11.7 m) fishing vessel sank off the coast of Mary Island in Alaska. The wreck report does not specify off which of several islands of the name the sinking took place.

=== 17 April ===
List of shipwrecks: 17 April 1961
Ship	State	Description
El Baire	Cuban Revolutionary Navy	Bay of Pigs Invasion: The El Baire-class submarine chaser was bombed and sunk at the Isle of Pines by Cuban Exile-operated Martin B-26 Marauder aircraft.
Houston	Liberia	Bay of Pigs Invasion: The CIA-chartered N3-S-A1 type coaster was bombed and damaged by a Cuban Air Force Hawker Sea Fury and Lockheed T-33 aircraft in the Bay of Cochinas. The ship was beached and later burned out.
Olsen	United States	The retired wooden-hulled fishing trawler and clam dredger was scuttled as an artificial reef in the North Atlantic Ocean off Point Pleasant Beach, New Jersey, in 65 feet (20 m) of water.
Rio Escondido	Liberia	Bay of Pigs Invasion: The CIA-chartered cargo ship, a converted landing craft tank, was rocketed and damaged by Cuban Air Force Hawker Sea Fury and Lockheed T-33 aircraft 2 miles (3.2 km) south of Playa Girón. The ship blew up and sank.
Seagarden	United States	The Liberty ship ran aground off Tobago. She was refloated but declared a constructive total loss.
SV-3	Cuban Revolutionary Navy	Bay of Pigs Invasion: The auxiliary patrol ship was sunk, or damaged and grounded, by ground fire.

=== 19 April ===
List of shipwrecks: 19 April 1961
Ship	State	Description
Larsen Bay No. 3	United States	The 61-gross register ton, 70.2-foot (21.4 m) scow was wrecked at Swikshak Beach near Kodiak, Alaska.
Tuskar	Netherlands	The coaster struck a rock and sank 4 nautical miles (7.4 km) south west of Chicken Rock, Isle of Man. All five crew saved by the cable layer Ariel (United Kingdom).

=== 21 April ===
List of shipwrecks: 21 April 1961
Ship	State	Description
Steffen Naess	Norway	The 86.2-foot (26.3 m) dry cargo ship, a sold off Admiralty drifter, capsized and sank off Kristiansund. Her Master and his 2 sons died.

=== 25 April ===
List of shipwrecks: 25 April 1961
Ship	State	Description
Ivernia	United Kingdom	The ocean liner ran aground off Southampton, Hampshire. Refloated after five hours.
White Cap	United States	The 31-gross register ton, 44-foot (13.4 m) fishing vessel was destroyed by fire near Fox Island in the Aleutian Islands.

=== Unknown date ===
List of shipwrecks: Unknown date April 1961
Ship	State	Description
Green Mountain State and San Luis Maru	United States; Japan	The Victory ship Green Mountain State and the tanker San Luis Maru collided off Yokohama in late April. Both vessels were damaged.
USS Makassar Strait	United States Navy	The wreck of USS Makassar Strait on 22 January 1963. The Casablanca-class escort carrier ran aground on San Nicolas Island, Channel Islands, California. The wreck broke up in January 1963.

== May ==
=== 3 May ===
List of shipwrecks: 3 May 1961
Ship	State	Description
Albatross	United States	The brigantine foundered in the Gulf of Mexico during a squall. Six of the nineteen people on board were killed.

=== 7 May ===
List of shipwrecks: 7 May 1961
Ship	State	Description
R-43	Cuban Revolutionary Navy	The auxiliary patrol ship went missing on this date, lost with all 17 hands.

=== 19 May ===
List of shipwrecks: 19 May 1961
Ship	State	Description
Kwang Lung	United States	The damaged T1 tanker was driven ashore at Kaohsiung, Taiwan. She was refloated on 6 June. Declared a constructive total loss, she was scrapped.

=== 25 May ===
List of shipwrecks: 25 May 1961
Ship	State	Description
Pinebranch	Canada	The tanker was sunk for use as a wharf at Malignant Cove, Nova Scotia.

=== 28 May ===
List of shipwrecks: 28 May 1961
Ship	State	Description
Madura	Liberia	Typhoon Viola: The cargo ship ran aground at Hong Kong. Refloated on 10 August but declared a constructive total loss and consequently scrapped.

=== 31 May ===
List of shipwrecks: 31 May 1961
Ship	State	Description
Marie Kerk	Netherlands	The cargo ship ran aground on the Varne Shoal in the English Channel. She was refloated with the aid of the tugs Diligent, Dominant (both United Kingdom) and Jean Bart (France).
Vercharmian	United Kingdom	The heavy lift ship ran aground in Mormugao Bay, India, She was refloated on 7 July but found to be leaky and was beached. Refloated on 5 October, she was towed to Karachi, Pakistan. Vercharmian was scrapped in 1962.

== June ==
=== 1 June ===
List of shipwrecks: 1 June 1961
Ship	State	Description
Josephine I	United States	The 14-gross register ton, 38-foot (11.6 m) fishing vessel was destroyed by fire at Juneau, Alaska.

=== 6 June ===
List of shipwrecks: 6 June 1961
Ship	State	Description
USS Baldwin	United States Navy	The decommissioned Gleaves-class destroyer was scuttled near Montauk Point, Long Island, New York.

=== 8 June ===
List of shipwrecks: 8 June 1961
Ship	State	Description
Tien Hsiang	Taiwan	The passenger ship sank 20 nautical miles (37 km; 23 mi) south west of Kaohsiung. Two survivors reported of her eleven crew and 33 passengers.

=== 14 June ===
List of shipwrecks: 14 June 1961
Ship	State	Description
Malina	United States	The 165-gross register ton, 82-foot (25.0 m) fishing vessel was wrecked in Bristol Bay off the coast of Alaska near the Black Hills (55°41′N 162°05′W) on the Alaska Peninsula.

=== 18 June ===
List of shipwrecks: 18 June 1961
Ship	State	Description
Southern Author	South Africa	The 439 GRT steam whaler was wrecked after running aground on Dassen Island, 50 nautical miles (93 km) north of Cape Town, South Africa.

=== 25 June ===
List of shipwrecks: 25 June 1961
Ship	State	Description
Evertsen	Netherlands	The coaster collided with Favoriet (Netherlands) and sank 17 nautical miles (31 km) south of Portland Bill, Dorset, United Kingdom. All twelve crew rescued by Favoriet and landed at Weymouth. Evertsen was only five weeks old at the time of her loss.

=== 26 June ===
List of shipwrecks: 26 June 1961
Ship	State	Description
CL-54	Soviet Navy	The target ship, a Storozhevoy-class destroyer foundered in the Sea of Okhotsk off Cape Taran.

=== 28 June ===
List of shipwrecks: 28 June 1961
Ship	State	Description
Melville W. Fuller	United States	The Liberty ship was torpedoed and sunk as a target ship in the Atlantic Ocean 100 nautical miles (190 km) west of Norfolk, Virginia by USS Cutlass (United States Navy).

=== Unknown date ===
List of shipwrecks: Unknown date June 1961
Ship	State	Description
Johnny E	United States	The 24-gross register ton, 44.5-foot (13.6 m) fishing vessel was destroyed by fire at the Icy Straits Cannery in the Alexander Archipelago in Southeast Alaska.

== July ==
=== 1 July ===
List of shipwrecks: 1 July 1961
Ship	State	Description
A R 4	United States	The 8-gross register ton, 27.5-foot (8.4 m) fishing vessel was lost in the vicinity of the Egegik River Buoy near Egegik, Alaska, after she became caught between a fish brailer and the motor vessel Alaska Reefer (United States).

=== 2 July ===
List of shipwrecks: 2 July 1961
Ship	State	Description
Stoyky	Soviet Navy	The Storozhevoy-class destroyer sank in a storm off Cape Taran, Kaliningrad Oblast.

=== 4 July ===
List of shipwrecks: 4 July 1961
Ship	State	Description
Lilly	United States	The 18-gross register ton, 40.1-foot (12.2 m) fishing vessel was destroyed by fire at Cordova, Alaska.

=== 8 July ===
List of shipwrecks: 8 July 1961
Ship	State	Description
Dupont	United States	The 71-gross register ton, 51.8-foot (15.8 m) motor cargo vessel sank off the south-central coast of Alaska approximately 1 nautical mile (1.9 km; 1.2 mi) south of Cape Suckling (59°59′30″N 143°53′00″W). The tug Barbara Foss (United States) rescued her crew of three.

=== 9 July ===
List of shipwrecks: 9 July 1961
Ship	State	Description
Save	Portugal	The cargo liner ran aground at Quelimane, Mozambique and caught fire. Of the 549 passengers and crew, 259 were killed.

=== 15 July ===
List of shipwrecks: 15 July 1961
Ship	State	Description
Dora	Panama	The ship ran aground on the Bitto Bank (10°30′N 107°42′E) and was abandoned. She was on a voyage from Phnom Penh, Cambodia to Hong Kong. Subsequently damaged and declared a total loss.
Welcome	United States	The 12-gross register ton, 42.3-foot (12.9 m) fishing vessel became stranded and was lost in Gambier Bay (57°28′N 133°55′W) on Admiralty Island in the Alexander Archipelago in Southeast Alaska.

=== 18 July ===
List of shipwrecks: 18 July 1961
Ship	State	Description
Kathi J	United States	The 8-gross register ton, 29.2-foot (8.9 m) fishing vessel was destroyed by fire at Naknek, Alaska.

=== 19 July ===
List of shipwrecks: 19 July 1961
Ship	State	Description
Pen 12	United States	The 8-gross register ton 28.6-foot (8.7 m) fishing vessel sank on the coast of Alaska between King Salmon and Bear River.

=== 21 July ===
List of shipwrecks: 21 July 1961
Ship	State	Description
Fort Hearne	Canada	The supply vessel was trapped in ice and sank in the Canadian Arctic.

=== 24 July ===
List of shipwrecks: 24 July 1961
Ship	State	Description
"Charlotte"	United Kingdom	The 33-foot (10 m) sail/auxiliary fishing vessel struck a buoy in Liverpool Bay and sank.

== August ==
=== 4 August ===
List of shipwrecks: 4 August 1961
Ship	State	Description
Mist	United States	The 17-gross register ton, 39.6-foot (12.1 m) fishing vessel sank at Mount Edgecumbe Dock in Sitka, Alaska.

=== 18 August ===
List of shipwrecks: 18 August 1961
Ship	State	Description
Exhibit	United States	The 21-gross register ton, 40.8-foot (12.4 m) motor cargo vessel was destroyed by fire at Hydaburg, Alaska.
Tammie-Norrie	United Kingdom	The yacht collided with the Victory ship Kilinski (Poland) and sank in the Elbe with the loss of five of the eight people on board.

=== 23 August ===
List of shipwrecks: 23 August 1961
Ship	State	Description
Merka	United States	The 8-gross register ton, 34-foot (10.4 m) fishing vessel was destroyed by fire in Controller Bay (60°05′N 144°15′W) on the south-central coast of Alaska.
Peary	United Kingdom	The coaster sank off the coast of Newfoundland, Canada. All eight crew rescued by Fergus (United Kingdom). Ship was built in 1918 as Bautzen, a Navarin-class minesweeper of the French Navy.

=== 24 August ===
List of shipwrecks: 24 August 1961
Ship	State	Description
World Jury	Greece	The tanker ran aground off Masirah Island, Oman and broke up. Twenty-eight of her crew were rescued by HMS Llandaff (Royal Navy).

== September ==
=== 4 September ===
List of shipwrecks: 4 September 1961
Ship	State	Description
Vencedor	Colombia	The passenger ship capsized and sank off Buenaventura with the loss of 50 lives.

=== 9 September ===
List of shipwrecks: 9 September 1961
Ship	State	Description
Denia M	United States	The 19-gross register ton, 38.9-foot (11.9 m) fishing vessel sank off Bold Cape (55°01′30″N 162°15′00″W) near King Cove, Alaska.

=== 11 September ===
List of shipwrecks: 11 September 1961
Ship	State	Description
Smile	United States	The 8-gross register ton, 31.5-foot (9.6 m) fishing vessel was destroyed by fire north of Wrangell Island in the Alexander Archipelago in Southeast Alaska.

=== 12 September ===
List of shipwrecks: 12 September 1961
Ship	State	Description
Alf and Jim	United States	The 12-gross register ton, 34.6-foot (10.5 m) fishing vessel was destroyed by fire at Port Wakefield, Alaska.

=== 13 September ===
List of shipwrecks: 13 September 1961
Ship	State	Description
Pafco No. 9	United States	The 14-gross register ton, 33.1-foot (10.1 m) fishing vessel was destroyed by fire at King Cove, Alaska.

=== 16 September ===
List of shipwrecks: 16 September 1961
Ship	State	Description
Heron	Netherlands	The coaster sank off Jersey, Channel Islands. Of her eleven crew, six were rescued by Cranborne (United Kingdom) and two by Port du Bouc (France).

=== 17 September ===
List of shipwrecks: 17 September 1961
Ship	State	Description
L'Opiniatre	French Navy	The frigate ran aground at Dales Voe, Shetland Islands, United Kingdom. Refloated by Haakon VII (Norway) and towed to Lerwick.

=== 21 September ===
List of shipwrecks: 21 September 1961
Ship	State	Description
Irma Belle	United States	The 9-gross register ton, 27.9-foot (8.5 m) fishing vessel was destroyed by fire at Meyers Chuck, Alaska.
Juno	United States	The 30-gross register ton, 47.7-foot (14.5 m) fishing vessel sank in Japanese Bay (56°56′N 153°41′W) on the coast of Alaska's Kodiak Island.

=== 23 September ===
List of shipwrecks: 23 September 1961
Ship	State	Description
Hyperien	United States	The 18-gross register ton, 43.2-foot (13.2 m) fishing vessel sank in Bartlett Cove (58°27′N 135°55′W) in Glacier Bay in Southeast Alaska.

=== 24 September ===
List of shipwrecks: 24 September 1961
Ship	State	Description
Virgie K	United States	The 13-gross register ton, 39.4-foot (12.0 m) fishing vessel foundered in Sitka Sound in Southeast Alaska.

=== 26 September ===
List of shipwrecks: 26 September 1961
Ship	State	Description
USNS Potomac	United States Navy	The Maumee-class oiler caught fire and was wracked by a series of explosions while moored at a pier at Morehead City, North Carolina, killing two men. Her bow section was declared a constructive total loss, but her 200-foot (61 m) stern section was cut away and combined with a new bow section to create the oiler SS Shenandoah, later renamed USNS Potomac.

== October ==
=== 1 October ===
List of shipwrecks: 1 October 1961
Ship	State	Description
Hess Mariner	United States	The T2 tanker suffered an explosion and fire 106 nautical miles (196 km) east of Jacksonville, Florida. She was on a voyage from Houston, Texas to Perth Amboy, New Jersey. Hess Mariner sank the next day.

=== 2 October ===
List of shipwrecks: 2 October 1961
Ship	State	Description
Pioneer II	United States	The 17-gross register ton 36.9-foot (11.2 m) fishing vessel sank off Driest Point (55°10′40″N 131°36′15″W) on Annette Island in the Alexander Archipelago in Southeast Alaska.
Richard K	United States	The 10-gross register ton, 34-foot (10.4 m) fishing vessel was destroyed by fire at Cold Bay, Alaska.
Sheikh	Greece	The cargo ship was driven ashore on Kito Daito Jiwa, Japan in a typhoon. She was on a voyage from Osaka, Japan to the Philippines. She broke in two and was a total loss.
Simferapol	Soviet Union	The depot ship ran aground between Walvis Bay and Swakopmund, South-West Africa and was wrecked.

=== 3 October ===
List of shipwrecks: 3 October 1961
Ship	State	Description
Chignik Pride	United States	The 7-gross register ton, 27.8-foot (8.5 m) fishing vessel was destroyed by fire at Chignik Lagoon, Alaska.
KFC-7	United States	The 7-gross register ton, 31.5-foot (9.6 m) fishing vessel was destroyed by fire at Chignik Lagoon, Alaska.

=== 4 October ===
List of shipwrecks: 4 October 1961
Ship	State	Description
San John	Lebanon	The cargo ship ran aground in Hudson Bay 20 nautical miles (37 km) north west of Churchill, Manitoba, Canada. She was on a voyage from the River Tyne to Churchill. Refloated the next day, she was declared a constructive total loss but was repaired and returned to service.

=== 8 October ===
List of shipwrecks: 8 October 1961
Ship	State	Description
Partner	United States	The 16-gross register ton, 37.5-foot (11.4 m) troller sank off Lemesurier Island in Icy Strait in Southeast Alaska. All five people aboard – a husband and wife and their three children – perished.

=== 10 October ===
List of shipwrecks: 10 October 1961
Ship	State	Description
USS Guardfish	United States Navy	The decommissioned Gato-class submarine was sunk as a torpedo target in Long Island Sound off New London, Connecticut, by the submarines USS Apogon and USS Blenny (both United States Navy).

=== 13 October ===
List of shipwrecks: 13 October 1861
Ship	State	Description
Husky	United States	The 50-gross register ton, 55.2-foot (16.8 m) fishing vessel was wrecked on Amak Island in the Aleutian Islands.

=== 15 October ===
List of shipwrecks: 15 October 1961
Ship	State	Description
Vibex	United Kingdom	The tanker ran aground in the St. Lawrence River in Canada. She later was refloated and returned to service.

=== 16 October ===
List of shipwrecks: 16 October 1961
Ship	State	Description
B B P 14	United States	The 8-gross register ton, 30-foot (9.1 m) fishing vessel was destroyed by fire at Dillingham, Alaska.

=== 17 October ===
List of shipwrecks: 17 October 1961
Ship	State	Description
Peggy L	United States	The 11-gross register ton, 32-foot (9.8 m) fishing vessel sank near Homer, Alaska.

=== 18 October ===
List of shipwrecks: 18 October 1961
Ship	State	Description
Arctic Viking	United Kingdom	The 501-gross register ton, 167-foot (50.9 m) fishing vessel sank off Flamborough Head, East Riding of Yorkshire, England, with the loss of five of her crew.

=== 19 October ===
List of shipwrecks: 19 October 1961
Ship	State	Description
HMS Barmouth	Royal Navy	The Bar-class boom defence vessel was in danger of running aground between Bempton and Speeton, Yorkshire after her tow line parted. All nine crew rescued by a helicopter from RAF Leconfield.

=== 22 October ===
List of shipwrecks: 22 October 1961
Ship	State	Description
Bianca C.	Italy	The passenger ship suffered an explosion and fire off Grenada. Although taken in tow by HMS Londonderry (Royal Navy), she sank on 24 October. One crew member was killed and eight were injured. Over 700 people were rescued.
Bascobel	United States	The tug sank at Mariners Harbor, New York. She was declared a constructive total loss, and scrapped in December 1963.
Halronell	Ireland	The collier ran aground on the Black Rock, off Rosslare Harbour, County Wexford. She was on a voyage from Newport, Monmouthshire, United Kingdom to Haulbowline, County Cork. She broke in two the next day and sank.
Tucuman	Argentina	The Victory ship ran aground at Bahía Blanca. She was on a voyage from Bahía Blanca to Liverpool, Lancashire, United Kingdom. She was refloated on 31 October and towed in to Bahía Blanca. Although declared a constructive total loss, she was repaired and returned to service.

=== 23 October ===
List of shipwrecks: 23 October 1961
Ship	State	Description
Halronell	Ireland	The cargo ship struck Black Rock, off Rosslare County Wexford coast and broke in two. Three of her six crew were killed, the other three were rescued by a helicopter from RAF Brawdy, Pembrokeshire, United Kingdom.

=== 27 October ===
List of shipwrecks: 27 October 1961
Ship	State	Description
Ruby S	United States	The 8-gross register ton, 31.8-foot (9.7 m) fishing vessel sank near Duke Island in the Alexander Archipelago in Southeast Alaska.

=== 30 October ===
List of shipwrecks: 30 October 1961
Ship	State	Description
Hwei Sung	Taiwan	The Liberty ship ran aground at Naoyetsu, Japan. She was later refloated but declared a constructive total loss and scrapped.

=== Unknown date ===
List of shipwrecks: Unknown date 1961
Ship	State	Description
Guy Junior	United States	The 50-gross register ton, 58.6-foot (17.9 m) fishing vessel sank off Montague Island on the south-central coast of Alaska.
Silver Star	United States	The 37-gross register ton, 43.9-foot (13.4 m) fishing vessel sank near Sukoi Bay on the south-central coast of Alaska sometime on or after 8 October with the loss of her entire crew of three. Her wreckage was found on a beach near Cape Douglas (58°52′N 153°16′W) on 14 October.
VIC 48	United Kingdom	Approval was given for the VIC-type lighter to be sunk as a target. She was based at Singapore at the time.

== November ==
=== 1 November ===
List of shipwrecks: 1 November 1961
Ship	State	Description
Brant	United States	The 44-foot (13.4 m) fishing vessel disappeared off the north coast of Alaska's Kodiak Island with the loss of her entire crew of three.

=== 2 November ===
List of shipwrecks: 2 November 1961
Ship	State	Description
Diskos	Greece	The Liberty ship ran aground off Panama City, Florida, United States. She was on a voyage from Panama City to Kobe, Japan. She was refloated and resumed her voyage, but suffered further damage en route in severe weather and was consequently scrapped in May 1962.

=== 5 November ===
List of shipwrecks: 5 November 1961
Ship	State	Description
Clan Keith	United Kingdom	The Ocean ship struck rocks and sank off Cape Bon, Tunisia.

=== 6 November ===
List of shipwrecks: 6 November 1961
Ship	State	Description
Carmella J	United States	The 35-gross register ton, 44.3-foot (13.5 m) fishing vessel was destroyed by a storm off Ugak Bay (57°25′N 152°35′W) on the coast of Alaska's Kodiak Island.
Clan Keith	United Kingdom	The cargo ship hit rocks (initially thought to have exploded but later disproved) and sank off the coast of Tunisia with the loss of 62 of her 68 crew.

=== 7 November ===
List of shipwrecks: 7 November 1961
Ship	State	Description
Union Reliance	Taiwan	The cargo ship collided with Berea (Norway) in the Houston Ship Channel, Texas, United States, killing twelve people on board Berea. Union Reliance subsequently caught fire and grounded and was abandoned by her owners. She was scrapped in March 1962.

=== 10 November ===
List of shipwrecks: 10 November 1961
Ship	State	Description
Freshfield	United Kingdom	In a fog, the coaster was struck by the Guinness ship Lady Gwendolen (Ireland) and sank in the Crosby Channel, River Mersey. All nine crew rescued after taking to the liferafts.

=== 12 November ===
List of shipwrecks: 10 November 1961
Ship	State	Description
Bluebelle	United States	The ketch was scuttled in the Atlantic Ocean by her captain after he murdered five of the other six people on board.

=== 16 November ===
List of shipwrecks: 16 November 1961
Ship	State	Description
Sparky	United States	The 7-gross register ton, 28.7-foot (8.7 m) fishing vessel was wrecked on the Copper River Flats in south-central Alaska.

=== 21 November ===
List of shipwrecks: 21 November 1961
Ship	State	Description
Ruth L	United States	The 55-gross register ton, 60.4-foot (18.4 m) motor vessel sank with the loss of three lives near Cape Douglas (58°51′N 153°15′W) on the south-central coast of Alaska.

=== 23 November ===
List of shipwrecks: 23 November 1961
Ship	State	Description
Amvrakikos	Greece	The Liberty ship ran aground on the Pancake Shoal, in Lake Superior. She was on a voyage from Toledo, Spain to a Japanese port. She was refloated on 26 November.

=== 24 November ===
List of shipwrecks: 24 November 1961
Ship	State	Description
Peggy Foss	United States	The 32-gross register ton, 51.9-foot (15.8 m) tug was destroyed by ice at Anchor Point, Alaska.

== December ==
=== 4 December ===
List of shipwrecks: 4 December 1961
Ship	State	Description
Stientje Mensinga	Netherlands	The coaster struck a rock off Eagle Island, County Mayo, Ireland and sank. Four crew took to a lifeboat. An attempt to rescue them was made by Maria Schulte (West Germany), which resulted in the loss of five crew from that ship too. Six crew were rescued by an Irish Navy helicopter.

=== 6 December ===
List of shipwrecks: 6 December 1961
Ship	State	Description
Antonakis	Panama	The cargo ship ran aground at Cape Spartel, Morocco (35°43′N 5°57′W) and broke in two. Declared a total loss. She was on a voyage from Santiago de Cuba, Cuba to Shanghai, China.
Montsoreau	France	The T2 tanker collided with the tanker Isidora (France) 12 nautical miles (22 km) north of Cape Spartel, Morocco. Montsoreau was towed to Gibraltar by Isidora and was beached. Montsoreau was on a voyage from La Skhirra, Tunisia to Port-de-Bouc, Bouches-du-Rhône. She was refloated on 19 December and towed to Port-de Bouc by the tug Laurent Chambon (France). She was consequently sold for scrapping.
Ondo	United Kingdom	The cargo ship ran aground on a sandbank near the Elbe No.2 Lightship (West Germany). She was abandoned as a total loss. She was on a voyage from Sapele, Nigeria to Riga, Soviet Union.

=== 8 December ===
List of shipwrecks: 8 December 1961
Ship	State	Description
Thorsheimer	Norway	The tanker ran aground on the Goodwin Sands, off the coast of Kent, United Kingdom.

=== 9 December ===
List of shipwrecks: 9 December 1961
Ship	State	Description
Sofia T	Greece	The cargo ship sank off Marmara Island, Turkey (40°35′N 27°34′E) with the loss of three crew.
Wiema	Netherlands	The coaster sank 2 nautical miles (3.7 km) north of the South Bishop Lighthouse, Pembrokeshire, United Kingdom. Her cargo had shifted in a storm and she attempted to make for Pembroke. Assistance was offered by the Admiralty tug Empire Netta (United Kingdom) but refused. She sank following engine failure, all five crew were rescued by the Trinity House vessel Argus (United Kingdom).

=== 10 December ===
List of shipwrecks: 10 December 1961
Ship	State	Description
Combine I	Panama	The cargo ship foundered 700 nautical miles (1,300 km) north east of Singapore. Only five of her 29 crew were rescued.
Ondo	United Kingdom	The cargo ship ran aground in the Elbe and was abandoned after attempts to salvage her were abandoned.

=== 12 December ===
List of shipwrecks: 12 December 1961
Ship	State	Description
Streatham Hill	United Kingdom	The cargo ship ran aground in the Schelde at Westkapelle, Belgium. Later refloated and returned to service.

=== 13 December ===
List of shipwrecks: 13 December 1961
Ship	State	Description
Allegrity	United Kingdom	The Empire Cadet-class coastal tanker ran aground at St Anthony Head, Cornwall. She was on a voyage from Le Havre, Seine-Maritime, France to the Stanlow Oil Refiner, Cheshire. She was refloated but ran aground at Veryan. Allegrity capsized on 22 December and was declared a total loss.
Spartan	Lebanon	The Liberty ship, ex-Henry Watterson, ran aground at Pasa Buenavista, Cuba. She was refloated on 29 May 1962, and towed to Havana. Declared a constructive total loss and scrapped.

=== 18 December ===
List of shipwrecks: 18 December 1961
Ship	State	Description
NRP Afonso de Albuquerque	Portuguese Navy	Annexation of Portuguese India: The Afonso de Albuquerque-class aviso's crew ran her aground after she suffered serious damage in combat with the frigates INS Betwa and INS Beas and a minesweeper (all Indian Navy) in the harbor at Goa, India. 5 killed and 13 wounded. Captured by Indian forces the next day, she was refloated in 1962 and scrapped.
Bascobel	United States	The tug sank at Mariners Harbor, New York, United States. She was refloated but declared a constructive total loss and consequently scrapped.
NRP Sirius	Portuguese Navy	Annexation of Portuguese India: The Antares-class patrol ship was scuttled at Goa, India to prevent capture.
NRP Vega	Portuguese Navy	Annexation of Portuguese India: The Antares-class patrol ship was strafed and sunk off Diu, India by Indian Air Force De Havilland Vampire aircraft. Her captain and one crewman were killed.

=== 22 December ===
List of shipwrecks: 22 December 1961
Ship	State	Description
Allegrity	United Kingdom	The coaster capsized and sank on Veryan beach, Cornwall. Her fourteen crew were saved by the Falmouth lifeboat.

=== 25 December ===
List of shipwrecks: 25 December 1961
Ship	State	Description
Maria	Greece	The Liberty ship ran aground at Maizuru, Japan. She was declared a constructive total loss.

=== 29 December ===
List of shipwrecks: 29 December 1961
Ship	State	Description
Malgomaj	Sweden	The bulk carrier collided with the tanker Esso Berlin (West Germany) in the Westerschelde and caught fire. Rondefjell (Norway) ran aground trying to avoid the two ships.

=== 30 December ===
List of shipwrecks: 30 December 1961
Ship	State	Description
Klyuchevsky	Soviet Union	The fishing trawler disappeared in the Bering Sea 90 nautical miles (170 km; 100 mi) west of Saint Paul Island.

== Unknown date ==
List of shipwrecks: Unknown date 1961
Ship	State	Description
Charleston	Canada	The former cruiser was removed from the Powell River Breakwater to prevent sinking and run aground in Kelsey Bay, Vancouver Island, Canada, sometime in 1961.
Jubilee	United States	The 30-foot (9.1 m) fishing vessel sank in Prince William Sound on the south-central coast of Alaska.

== See also ==
- Lists of shipwrecks
