= Rob Payne =

Canadian novelist

Rob Payne is a Canadian novelist.

Payne is married and lives in Perth, Australia with his wife and daughter.

He is the author of three dramatic-comedy novels for adults, and two science fiction, comedy-adventure novels for young adults. He is also known for his work as a writer and/or editor for such publications as The Globe and Mail, Canadian Fiction, Front and Centre and Quarry.

How to Be a Hero on Earth 5 was nominated for the 2007 White Pine Award.

== Bibliography ==
- Live By Request - (2002)
- Working Class Zero - (2003)
- Sushi Daze - (2005)
- How to Be a Hero on Earth 5 - (2006)
- How to Save the Universe Again - (2007)

Essays

- The Brisbane International Arts Festival
