= SS Dollart =

German built merchant ship (1912–1961)

History
- Name: Dollart (1912–45); Empire Constancy (1945–47); Polzeath (1947–51); Meltem (1951–56); Yener 9 (1956–59); Yarasli (1959–61)
- Owner: Bugsier Reederei und Bergungs AG (1912–45); Ministry of War Transport (1945); Ministry of Transport (1945–47); S Hannan & Co (1947–51); Azize Arkan v. Ortaklari (1951–56); Erpak Vap. Ithalkat Ihracat, (1956–59); Zeki v. Ziya Son (1959–61)
- Operator: Bugsier Reederei und Bergungs AG (1912–45); Rose Line Ltd (1945–47); S Hannan & Co (1947–51); Azize Arkan v. Ortaklari (1951–56); Erpak Vap. Ithalkat Ihracat, (1956–59); Zeki v. Ziya Son (1959–61)
- Port of registry: (German Empire) Hamburg (1912–19); (Weimar Republic) Hamburg (1919–33); (Nazi Germany) Bremerhaven (1933–45); (United Kingdom) London (1945–47); Turkey (1947–61)
- Builder: Stettiner Oderwerke AG,
- Launched: 1912
- Out of service: January 1961
- Identification: Code Letters RSMN (1912–34); Code Letters DHFJ (1934–45); Code Letters GFXT (1945–51); United Kingdom Official Number 180639 (1945–51)
- Fate: Disappeared in January 1961, presumed sunk

General characteristics
- Class & type: Coaster
- Tonnage: 535 GRT; 266 NRT
- Length: 165 ft 8 in (50.50 m)
- Beam: 28 ft 6 in (8.69 m)
- Depth: 11 ft 5 in (3.48 m)
- Installed power: Compound steam engine
- Propulsion: Screw propeller

Dollart was a 535 GRT coaster that was built in 1912 by Stettiner Oderwerke AG, Stettin, Germany for German owners. She was seized by the Allies in May 1945, passed to the Ministry of War Transport (MoWT) and was renamed Empire Constancy. In 1947, she was sold into merchant service and renamed Polzeath. In 1951, she was sold to Turkey and renamed Meltem. Further sales saw her renamed Yener 9 in 1956 and Yarasli in 1959. She went missing in the Ionian Sea in January 1961.

== Description ==
The ship was built in 1912 by Stettiner Oderwerke, Stettin.

The ship was 165 feet 8 inches (50.50 m) long, with a beam of 28 feet 6 inches (8.69 m) and a depth of 11 feet 5 inches (3.48 m). The ship had a GRT of 535 and a NRT of 268.

The ship was propelled by a compound steam engine which had one cylinder of 17 3/16 inches (43.7 cm) and one cylinder of 31 1/2 inches (80 cm) diameter by 21 3/4 inches (55 cm) stroke. The engine was built by Stettiner Oderwerke.

== History ==
Dollart was built for Bugsier Reederei und Bergungs AG, Hamburg. Her port of registry was Hamburg, the Code Letters RSMN were allocated. On 1 May 1914, Dollart struck the wreck of SS Werner in the River Elbe at Glückstadt and sank with the loss of two crew. In May 1919, Dollart transported a cargo of food and clothing from Germany to Scapa Flow, Orkney Islands to supply the crews of Kaiserliche Marine crews interned there. In 1933, her port of registry was changed to Bremerhaven. The following year, her Code Letters were changed to DHFJ.

In May 1945, Dollart was seized by the Allies at Copenhagen, Denmark. She was passed to the MoWT and renamed Empire Constancy. Her port of registry was changed to London and she was placed under the management of Rose Line Ltd. The Code Letters GFXT and United Kingdom Official Number 180639 were allocated. In 1947, Empire Constancy was sold to S Hannan & Co Ltd, Polzeath and was renamed Polzeath.

In 1951, Polzeath was sold to Azize Arkan v. Ortaklari, Turkey and was renamed Meltem. In 1956, she was sold to Erpak Vap Ithalkat Ihracat, Turkey and was renamed Yener 9. In 1959, she was sold to Zeki v Ziya Son Izzet Kirtil, Turkey and was renamed Yarasli. On 14 January 1961, Yarasli sailed from Istanbul bound for Bagnoli, Italy. On 25 January, she reported passing Kefalonia, Greece. Nothing further was heard of her and it is presumed she foundered in the Ionian Sea.
