= Front and Centre =

- Genre: Music
- Written by: Chris Beard
- Country of origin: Canada
- Original language: English
- No. of seasons: 1
- No. of episodes: 12

Production
- Producer: Terry Kyne

Original release
- Network: CBC Television
- Release: 3 July – 18 September 1963

Front and Centre is a Canadian music variety television series that aired on CBC Television in 1963.

== Premise ==
Front and Centre was patterned after The Ed Sullivan Show and was recorded with a live audience with a stage shaped like a star. Musical directors such as Lucio Agostini, Ricky Hyslop, and Eddie Karam were featured on various episodes. Dancers appearing during the series run included Don Gillies and Bob Van Norman. Guest artists included Tommy Hunter, Ian and Sylvia and Larry D. Mann.

Series sponsors were Kraft Foods and Pepsi-Cola's Canadian division.

== Scheduling ==
The half-hour series was broadcast Wednesdays at 8:30 p.m. from 3 July to 18 September 1963.
