= List of shipwrecks in 1943 =

The list of shipwrecks in 1943 includes ships sunk, foundered, grounded, or otherwise lost during 1943.

table of contents
1943
Jan	Feb	Mar	Apr
May	Jun	Jul	Aug
Sep	Oct	Nov	Dec
Unknown date

== Unknown date ==
List of shipwrecks: Unknown date 1943
Ship	State	Description
Alice L. Pendleton	United States	The 228-foot (69 m), four-masted lumber schooner (1,394 GRT, 1918) was abandoned at the Palmer Shipyard on the west side of the Mystic River in Noank, Connecticut, sometime during the 1940s, gradually rotted away, and settled on the river bottom in 10 feet (3.0 m) of water.
Cafernströn	Sweden	World War II: The cargo ship was bombed and sunk at Gdynia, Poland, by United States Army Air Forces aircraft.
Cretestem	United Kingdom	World War II: The 125-foot (38 m) concrete tugboat, was bombed and destroyed sometime in 1943.
D S S Co. No. 8	United States	The 33-gross register ton, 54.2-foot (16.5 m) scow sank in the Taku River in the Territory of Alaska.
Enna	Italy	World War II: The cargo vessel was bombed and sunk by Allied aircraft. Raised and scrapped in 1947
Galveston	United States Army	The US Army Corps of Engineers dredge sank in a hurricane, probably off Galveston, Texas. 12 crew were killed.
Gelmer	United States	The dredge sank south of Apalachicola, Florida in the Gulf of Mexico (29°19′N 84°55′W) in 88 feet (27 m) of water.
Gambhira	United Kingdom	World War II: The cargo ship was sunk as a target ship off Llandudno, Caernarfonshire.
Gerhard	Germany	World War II: The 184.7-foot (56.3 m), 777-ton cargo vessel was bombed and sunk at Hamburg. Raised, repaired and returned to service.
Gyoraitei No. 109	Imperial Japanese Navy	The TM 4/No. 102-class motor torpedo boat (13.1/19 t, 1942) was lost in 1943 or 1945.
Gyoraitei No. 110	Imperial Japanese Navy	The TM 4/No. 102-class motor torpedo boat (13.1/19 t, 1942) was lost in 1943 or 1945.
Gyoraitei No. 111	Imperial Japanese Navy	The TM 4/No. 102-class motor torpedo boat (13.1/19 t, 1942) was lost in 1943 or 1945.
Kaifuku Maru	Japan	World War II: The cargo ship was torpedoed and sunk in the East China Sea by the submarine USS Seawolf (United States Navy) between 5 October and 27 November.
Miyadonu Maru	Japan	World War II: The cargo liner was torpedoed and sunk in the Pacific Ocean by the submarine USS Growler (United States Navy) sometime between 17 February and 27 October.
Moliette	United Kingdom	The 125.5-foot (38.3 m), out-of-service, concrete-hulled merchant ship was put in use as a machine gun and rocket target for the United States Army Air Forces, and was sunk in this role on an unknown date off West Mersea (51°46′N 00°59′E).
Sidney	Australia	The wreck of the former HMAS Protector at low tide on 22 March 2008. After suffering damage in a collision with a tug off Gladstone, Queensland, Australia, and being abandoned c. July 1943, the former lighter – originally the flatiron gunboat HMAS Protector (Royal Australian Navy) – was scuttled for use as a breakwater at Heron Island off Queensland on an unknown date.
Taiau Maru	Japan	World War II: The cargo ship was torpedoed and sunk in the Pacific Ocean by the submarine USS Gudgeon (United States Navy) sometime between 1 September and 6 October.
Tateyama Maru	Japan	World War II: The cargo ship was torpedoed and sunk in the Philippine Sea by the submarine USS Pickerel (United States Navy) sometime between 10 July and 26 August.
Thaddeus S. C. Lowe	United States	The Liberty ship was damaged while loading landing ships in heavy seas and was declared a constructive total loss.
Unknown shipwreck		A wreck was charted in 1943 6.8 miles (10.9 km) from the American Shoal Light, Florida at 24°34′N 81°24′W. The wreck was destroyed on 24 March 1944.
Unknown shipwreck		A wreck was charted in 1943 just off the north west coast of Key West, Florida at 24°35′N 81°48′W.
Unknown shipwreck		A wreck was charted in 1943 east of Marathon, Florida at 24°42′N 80°52′W.
Wuhu Maru	Japan	World War II: The cargo ship was torpedoed and sunk in the East China Sea by the submarine USS Seawolf (United States Navy).
Yamagibu Maru	Japan	World War II: The cargo ship was torpedoed and sunk in the Celebes Sea by the submarine USS Pargo (United States Navy) sometime between 13 June and 3 September.
Zibello	Italy	The 160-foot (49 m) barge was sunk off Internati Island National Park in the River Po.

== See also ==
- List of shipwrecks
