= SS Robert Treat Paine =

Liberty ship of WWII

History

United States
- Name: Robert Treat Paine
- Namesake: Robert Treat Paine
- Owner: War Shipping Administration (WSA)
- Operator: Agwilines Inc.
- Ordered: as type (EC2-S-C1) hull, MCE hull 32
- Awarded: 14 March 1941
- Builder: Bethlehem-Fairfield Shipyard, Baltimore, Maryland
- Cost: $1,142,364
- Yard number: 2019
- Way number: 6
- Laid down: 6 January 1942
- Launched: 28 March 1942
- Completed: 5 May 1942
- Identification: Call sign: KETK
- Fate: Sold to France, 10 January 1947

France
- Name: Dieppe
- Namesake: Dieppe
- Owner: France
- Operator: Cie. Generale Transatlantique
- Fate: Sold, 1954

Liberia
- Name: Brother George
- Owner: Garraway S.A
- Operator: Wigham Richardson & Co
- Fate: Scrapped following grounding 1964

General characteristics
- Class & type: Liberty ship; type EC2-S-C1, standard
- Tonnage: 10,865 LT DWT; 7,176 GRT
- Displacement: 3,380 long tons (3,434 t) (light); 14,245 long tons (14,474 t) (max)
- Length: 441 feet 6 inches (135 m) oa; 416 feet (127 m) pp; 427 feet (130 m) lwl
- Beam: 57 feet (17 m)
- Draft: 27 ft 9.25 in (8.4646 m)
- Installed power: 2 × Oil fired 450 °F (232 °C) boilers, operating at 220 psi (1,500 kPa); 2,500 hp (1,900 kW)
- Propulsion: 1 × triple-expansion steam engine, (manufactured by General Machinery Corp., Hamilton, Ohio); 1 × screw propeller
- Speed: 11.5 knots (21.3 km/h; 13.2 mph)
- Capacity: 562,608 cubic feet (15,931 m^{3}) (grain); 499,573 cubic feet (14,146 m^{3}) (bale)
- Complement: 38–62 USMM; 21–40 USNAG
- Armament: Varied by ship; Bow-mounted 3-inch (76 mm)/50-caliber gun; Stern-mounted 4-inch (102 mm)/50-caliber gun; 2–8 × single 20-millimeter (0.79 in) Oerlikon anti-aircraft (AA) cannons and/or, 2–8 × 37-millimeter (1.46 in) M1 AA guns

SS Robert Treat Paine was a Liberty ship built in the United States during World War II. She was named after Robert Treat Paine, an American lawyer, politician, and Founding Father best known as a signer of the United States Declaration of Independence as a representative of Massachusetts. He served as the state's first attorney general, and served as an associate justice of the Massachusetts Supreme Judicial Court, the state's highest court.

== Construction ==
Robert Treat Paine was laid down on 6 January 1942, under a Maritime Commission (MARCOM) contract, MCE hull 32, by the Bethlehem-Fairfield Shipyard, Baltimore, Maryland; and was launched on 28 March 1942.

== History ==
She was allocated to Agwilines Inc., on 5 May 1942. On 10 January 1947, she was sold to for commercial use to France, for $544,506, and renamed Dieppe. In 1954, she was sold and renamed Brother George. In 1964, she was grounded off the Isle of Wight, and scrapped in the Netherlands, the same year.

== Bibliography ==
- "Bethlehem-Fairfield, Baltimore MD". www.ShipbuildingHistory.com. 14 August 2008.
- Maritime Administration. "Robert Treat Paine". Ship History Database Vessel Status Card. U.S. Department of Transportation, Maritime Administration.
- Davies, James (May 2004). "Specifications (As-Built)" (PDF). p. 23.
- "SS Robert Treat Paine".
