= List of ship launches in 1947 =

The list of ship launches in 1947 includes a chronological list of all ships launched in 1947.

Date	Ship	Class / type	Builder	Location	Country	Notes
8 January	Agapenor	Cargo ship	Scotts Shipbuilding and Engineering Company	Greenock	United Kingdom	For China Mutual Steam Navigation Company Ltd.
4 February	Worcester	Worcester-class cruiser	New York Shipbuilding	Camden, New Jersey	United States	First of class
6 February	Khalafabad	Tank barge	J. Bolson & Son Ltd.	Poole	United Kingdom	For Petroleum Steamship Co. Ltd.
20 February	La Heve	Cargo ship	Harland & Wolff	Belfast	United Kingdom	For Compagnie Génerale Transatlantique.
25 February	Parthia	Cargo liner	Harland and Wolff	Belfast, Northern Ireland	United Kingdom	For Cunard Line
7 March	Salinas	Cargo ship	Harland & Wolff	Belfast	United Kingdom	For Pacific Steam Navigation Company.
23 March	Empire Stroma	Cargo ship	Shipbuilding Corporation Ltd.	Newcastle upon Tyne	United Kingdom	For Ministry of Transport. Completed as Ashantian for United Africa Co. Ltd.
25 March	Acheron	Amphion-class submarine			United Kingdom	
25 March	Munster	Ferry	Harland & Wolff	Belfast	United Kingdom	For Coast Lines.
25 March	Salem	Des Moines-class cruiser	Fore River Shipyard	Quincy, Massachusetts	United States	
9 April	BO-183	Kronshtadt-class submarine chaser	Zelenodolsk Gorky Plant	Zelenedolsk	Soviet Union	
9 April	BO-184	Kronshtadt-class submarine chaser	Zelenodolsk Gorky Plant	Zelenedolsk	Soviet Union	
9 April	BO-185	Kronshtadt-class submarine chaser	Zelenodolsk Gorky Plant	Zelenedolsk	Soviet Union	
22 April	Centaur	Centaur-class aircraft carrier	Harland and Wolff	Belfast, Northern Ireland	United Kingdom	For Royal Navy.
23 April	Soochow	Ferry	Harland & Wolff	Belfast	United Kingdom	For The China Navigation Company.
27 April	BO-181	Kronshtadt-class submarine chaser	Zelenodolsk Gorky Plant	Zelenedolsk	Soviet Union	
27 April	BO-182	Kronshtadt-class submarine chaser	Zelenodolsk Gorky Plant	Zelenedolsk	Soviet Union	
28 April	Empire Ronaldsay	Cargo ship	Shipbuilding Corporation Ltd.	Sunderland	United Kingdom	For Ministry of Transport. Completed as Lagosian for United Africa Co. Ltd.
7 May	Suffolk Ferry	Train ferry	John Brown and Company	Clydebank, Scotland	United Kingdom	For London and North Eastern Railway
16 May	Albion	Centaur-class aircraft carrier	Swan Hunter	Wallsend, England	United Kingdom	
20 May	Leinster	Ferry	Harland & Wolff	Belfast	United Kingdom	For Coast Lines.
3 June	Kantara	Cargo ship	Harland & Wolff	Belfast	United Kingdom	For Moss Hutchinson Line.
16 June	Roanoke	Worcester-class cruiser	New York Shipbuilding	Camden, New Jersey	United States	
17 June	Imperial Star	Refrigerated cargo ship	Harland & Wolff	Belfast	United Kingdom	For Blue Star Line.
19 June	Thorshavet	Factory ship	Harland & Wolff	Belfast	United Kingdom	For A/S Thor Dahl Ltd.
15 August	Zarian	Cargo ship	Shipbuilding Corporation Ltd	Newcastle upon Tyne	United Kingdom	For United Africa Co. Ltd
16 August	Empire Birdsay	Cargo ship	Shipbuilding Corporation Ltd.	Newcastle upon Tyne	United Kingdom	For Ministry of Shipping. Completed as Zarian for United Africa Co. Ltd.
19 August	Pretoria Castle	Passenger ship	Harland & Wolff	Belfast	United Kingdom	For Union-Castle Line.
29 August	Salamanca	Cargo ship	Harland & Wolff	Belfast	United Kingdom	For Pacific Steam Navigation Company.
2 September	Pelorus	Pilot tender	Harland & Wolff	Belfast	United Kingdom	For Trinity House.
16 September	Tiru	Balao-class submarine	Mare Island Navy Yard	Vallejo, California	United States	
30 September	Lotorium	Tanker	Harland & Wolff	Belfast	United Kingdom	For Anglo-Saxon Petroleum Company.
2 October	Karnak	Cargo ship	Harland & Wolff	Belfast	United Kingdom	For Moss Hutchinson Line.
2 October	Melbourne Star	Refrigerated cargo ship	Harland & Wolff	Belfast	United Kingdom	For Blue Star Line.
14 October	Orcades	Ocean liner	Vickers Armstrong	Barrow-in-Furness, England	United Kingdom	For Orient Line
16 October	Edinburgh Castle	Passenger ship	Harland & Wolff	Belfast	United Kingdom	For Union-Castle Line.
30 October	Caronia	Ocean liner/Cruise ship	John Brown & Company	Clydebank, Scotland	United Kingdom	For Cunard Line
30 October	Penlee	Pilot tender	Harland & Wolff	Belfast	United Kingdom	For Trinity House.
7 November	Empire Ely	Cargo ship	Flender Werke	Lübeck	Germany	For Ministry of Transport
8 November	Equity I	Fishing trawler	Brooke Marine Ltd.	Lowestoft	United Kingdom	For Scottish Co-operative Wholesale Society Ltd.
11 December	British Ranger	Tanker	Harland & Wolff	Belfast	United Kingdom	For British Tanker Company.
20 December	Tobruk	Battle-class destroyer	Cockatoo Island Dockyard	Sydney, New South Wales	Australia	
Unknown date	Dwarka	Cargo liner	Barclay, Curle & Co. Ltd.	Glasgow	United Kingdom	For British India Steam Navigation Company.
Unknown date	Falaise	Ferry	William Denny and Brothers	Dumbarton	United Kingdom	For Southern Railway.
Unknown date	MFV-439	Naval Motor Fishing Vessel	J. Bolson & Son Ltd.	Poole	United Kingdom	For Royal Navy.
Unknown date	MFV-440	Naval Motor Fishing Vessel	J. Bolson & Son Ltd.	Poole	United Kingdom	For Royal Navy, completed as commercial vessel.
Unknown date	MFV-441	Naval Motor Fishing Vessel	J. Bolson & Son Ltd.	Poole	United Kingdom	For Royal Navy.
Unknown date	MFV-442	Naval Motor Fishing Vessel	J. Bolson & Son Ltd.	Poole	United Kingdom	For Royal Navy.
Unknown date	MFV.1225	Motor Fishing Vessel	Berthon Boat Co. Ltd	Lymington	United Kingdom	For Royal Navy.
Unknown date	Pemex 464	Tank barge	Alabama Drydock and Shipbuilding Company	Mobile, Alabama	United States	For Compania Petroleos Mexicanos.
Unknown date	Pemex 465	Tank barge	Alabama Drydock and Shipbuilding Company	Mobile, Alabama	United States	For Compania Petroleos Mexicanos.
Unknown date	Persian Knot	Type C1 ship	Southeastern Shipbuilding Corporation	Savannah, Georgia	United States	For private owner.
Unknown date	Ring Hitch	Type C1 ship	Southeastern Shipbuilding Corporation	Savannah, Georgia	United States	For private owner.
Unknown date	SK-133	Barge	Alabama Drydock and Shipbuilding Company	Mobile, Alabama	United States	For Southern Kraft Corporation.
Unknown date	SK-134	Barge	Alabama Drydock and Shipbuilding Company	Mobile, Alabama	United States	For Southern Kraft Corporation.
Unknown date	SK-135	Barge	Alabama Drydock and Shipbuilding Company	Mobile, Alabama	United States	For Southern Kraft Corporation.
Unknown date	SK-136	Barge	Alabama Drydock and Shipbuilding Company	Mobile, Alabama	United States	For Southern Kraft Corporation.
Unknown date	Five vessels	Tank barges	Alabama Drydock and Shipbuilding Company	Mobile, Alabama	United States	For Compania Petroleos Mexicanos; prefixed "Pemex", likely followed by a number.
Unknown date	Unnamed	Motor yacht	J. Bolson & Son Ltd.	Poole	United Kingdom	For private owner.
Unknown date	Unnamed	Barge	J. Bolson & Son Ltd.	Poole	United Kingdom	For R. & J. H. Rea Ltd.
