= Offinso Municipal District =

- Municipal District
- Districts of Ashanti Region

- Location of Offinso Municipal District within Ashanti
- Coordinates: 6°59′N 1°41′W
- Country: Ghana
- Region: Ashanti
- Capital: Offinso

Government
  - Municipal Chief Executive: Hon. Solomon Kesse

Area
  - Total: 1,451 km^{2} (560 sq mi)

Population (2002)
  - Total: 138,190
- Time zone: UTC+0 (GMT)
- ISO 3166 code: GH-AH-OF

Offinso Municipal District is one of the forty-three districts in Ashanti Region, Ghana. Originally created as an ordinary district assembly in 1988 when it was known as Offinso District, which it was created from the former Offinso District Council; until the northern part of the district was later split off to create Offinso North District on 29 February 2008; while the remaining part was elevated to municipal district assembly status on the same year to become Offinso Municipal District. The municipality is located in the northern part of Ashanti Region and has Offinso as its capital town.

== History ==
In the early 18th century, the people of Offinso were regarded as one of the Ashanti Empire’s strongest armies and played a role in the conquering of Denkyira, Akyem and Bono territory. Led by Nana Wiafe Akenten I, the second paramount chief of Offinso, they assisted in the Ashanti Empire’s great expansion over Ghana.

As a reward for Offinso people’s contributions in war, Nana Osei Tutu I granted Nana Wiafe Akenten I, a vast amount of land in the kingdom. The land granted is what makes up the present day Offinso Municipality.

== Settlements ==
- Aboasu
- Abofour
- Amowi
- Anyinasuso
- Asuboi
- Asuosu
- Dome
- Kayera
- Aduana
- Koforidua
- Kokote
- Maase
- Mpehi
- Namong
- Oboase
- Dentin
- Ahodwo
- Ampabame
- New Town
- Agyempra
- Obuasi
- Asamankama
- Sakam
- Antoa
- Offinso Old Town
- Sampronso
- Koforidua
- Ayensua
- Bonsua
- Abofour Camp

== Education ==
In Offinso District there are:

- 44 kindergartens (teacher-pupil ratio of 1:19)
- 95 primary schools (teacher-pupil ratio of 1:28)
- 48 junior secondary schools (teacher-pupil ratio of 1:16)
- four senior secondary schools
- a polytechnic
- a Bible school
- a teacher training college
- a midwifery training school (Midwifery Training School, Offinso)

Public schools

There are 52 kindergartens, 94 primary schools, and 52 junior secondary schools.

Private schools

There are 44 kindergartens, 42 primary schools, and 15 junior secondary schools.

== Culture ==
The indigenous people of the Offinso district are Ashanti’s, hence the large cultural presence in the area.

The Municipality has a major festival known as Mmoaninko, which is celebrated every four years. It is an occasion which brings Offinso citizens, home and abroad, together to discuss the development of the Municipality. The festival also remembers the great efforts of Nana Wiafe Akenten I and the Offinso people in the wars for the Ashanti Empire in the early 18th century.

== Demographics ==
About 85% of the population are Asante, while the remaining 15% comprises other ethnic groups, the majority of whom hail from the Northern, Upper West, and Upper East Regions.

Christianity is the main religion practiced in the district, although there is a significant Muslim population in the town of Offinso.

== Governance ==
The Municipality has one paramount chief, the Offinsohene, and several sub-chiefs.

== Notable people ==
- Most Rev Dr Peter Kwasi Sarpong, Emeritus Archbishop of Kumasi Catholic Archdiocese.
- Dr. Opoku (Executive Director, Seed Production Division (SPD), Ghana Cocoa Board
- Kwame Owusu Achaw – author, Ako Te Brofo English Grammar
- Brother Oppong Addai – retired soldier.
- Dr. Apea – owns a clinic at Bomso
- Dr. Kofi Konadu Apraku – politician, hails from the northern part of Offinso
- Adiyiah Dominic – striker, Arsenal Kyiv and the National Team (Black Stars of Ghana)
- Dr. Nyarko – art education, Kwame Nkrumah University of Science and Technology
- Nana Sir Osei Sarpong, Mpehihene, and President, Offinso Monchengladbach Co-operation for Development
- P. A. Okyere – author
- Rudolf Osei – Librarian, Ghana Education Service and CEO, Holy Uriel Printers, Kwadaso
- The Late Hon. Kwabena Safo – MP Offinso South Constituency, 2001 - 2005
- Dr. K.K Sarpong – chairman of Kumasi Asante Kotoko FC
- Babara Serwa – politician, National Democratic Congress

== Sources ==
- "Districts of Ghana". Statoids.
- GhanaDistricts.com
