= George James Cole, Baron Cole =

Cole in 1965 by Walter Bird

George James Cole, Baron Cole, GBE, (3 February 1906 – 26 November 1979) was a British industrialist and politician. He was raised to the peerage on 24 March 1965.

George James Cole was born 3 February 1906 in Malaya, the son of James Francis Cole, and was educated at the Raffles Institute in Singapore.

Cole held a number of Industrial positions including, Joint Managing Director of The United African Co. Ltd, 1952–5, a Director of Taylor Woodrow (W. Africa) Ltd. 1947–55, Chairman of Palm Line Ltd. 1952–5, Director of The Niger Co. Ltd 1951–70, Director of Finance Corporation for Industry 1957–73, Director of Commonwealth Development Finance Co. Ltd. 1966–70, Chairman of Unilever Ltd. 1960–70. He was also Chairman of the Governing body of the London Graduate School of Business Studies 1965–70, Chairman of the Advisory Committee on Appointment of Advertising Agents 1965-71 and Chairman of Rolls-Royce (1971) Ltd. 1971–72.

He was a Commander of the Order of Orange Nassau of the Netherlands.

He was created a life peer as Baron Cole, of Blackfriars, in the County of London on 24 March 1965.

In the Birthday Honours of 1973 he was appointed a Knight Grand Cross of the Order of the British Empire, for services to industry.

In 1940 he married Ruth Harpham and had two children, Jonathon Dare and Juliet Anthea. He died on the 26 November 1979 at the age of 73.

Coat of arms of George James Cole, Baron Cole

Crest
In front of a palm tree a lymphad sail furled Proper pennon and flags flying Gules.
Escutcheon
Barry wavy of eight Argent and Azure a fess and supporting it in base a chevron enarched Sable.
Supporters
Dexter an okapi Proper, sinister a Malayan deer (Sambar) Proper
Motto
Consult Resolve And Act
