= Ambas Bay Trading Company =

Ambas Bay Trading Company was a British company which operated in Cameroon between 1884 and 1920. It was one of the smaller companies that preceded the United African Company. It also operated under the name in Fernando Po until 1970.

The firm was founded in November 1888 by Walter Woodin in partnership with Benjamin Bullock. Woodin served as the manager and also managed his own firm, W.D. Woodin and Co. The company's activities was concentrated in Victoria and Santa Isabel, Fernando Po, operation began at a time Germany colonized Kamerun and the firm had to compete with both Liverpool and German firms. In 1913, Ambas Bay acquired a large cocoa plantation in Bwinga and owned a rubber estate at Bai but due to war, business activities slowed in 1914. After the war, most of the firm's properties in Victoria were sold to W.D. Woodin and Co and remaining shares were sold to the African & Eastern Trade Corporation. In San Fernando Po, Ambas Bay Trading continued to conduct business under the name until 1970.
