= Nana Wiafe Akenten II =

- Offinsohene

Paramount Chief of Offinso
- Reign: 1946 – 1959
- Enstoolment: 1946
- Predecessor: Nana Kwabena Wiafe
- Successor: Nana Kwabena Wiafe
- Reign: 1966 – 1993
- Enstoolment: 1966
- Predecessor: Nana Kwabena Wiafe
- Successor: Nana Wiafe Akenten III
- Born: 12 November 1910; Offinso-Tutuase, Ashanti Region, Gold Coast (British colony) (now Ghana)
- House: Asona
- Education: Achimota College

Nana Wiafe Akenten II (born 12 November 1910, date of death unknown) was a traditional ruler and Omanhene of the Offinso Traditional Area. He is known to be the second Offinso royal who was enstooled twice.

== Early life and education ==
Akenten II was born on 12 November 1910, in Offinso-Tutuase, in the Ashanti Region. He began his early education at the Kumasi Roman Catholic School, and was sent to Achimota College by his uncle, Nana Kwabena Poku, who served as the omanhene of Offinso from 1921 to 1929. Subsequently, he completed his education at Achimota College and graduated as a teacher.

== Career and reign ==
After teaching at the Catholic School in Kumasi, Akenten II worked as a Cocoa Produce Buyer at the United Africa Company (U. A. C.) in Berekum. He later became the First Head Teacher of the Kumasi Division School. He served in the capacity of secretary for the Offinso Unity Club, an association of literates in Offinso. During the 1940s, the club presented development proposals to the colonial administration, aiming to address the needs and advancement of the Offinso Traditional area.

On April 25, 1946, Akenten II was enstooled as the Offinsohene. Following the colonial reforms of the Native Authority system, he assigned individuals associated with the club to roles within the newly established Native Authority committees in the Offinso area. During his reign, Akenten II was a member of the management committee of WACRI for five years. During his reign, he resigned from the North District Council and the Offinso State and Local Councils. In 1959, he was destooled by the then CPP government, following disturbances that occurred at Offinso. He was later enstooled in 1966 after the Nkrumah government was overthrown. He subsequently spent the period between 1959 and 1966 in exile.

== Personal life ==
Akenten II's hobbies included hunting, lawn tennis, and arts and crafts.
