= List of Empire ships (S) =

There were over 140 Empire ships that had a suffix beginning with S. They can be found at:

- List of Empire ships (Sa–Sh)
- List of Empire ships (Si–Sy).
