= Nana Kwabena Wiafe =

Ghanaian monarch of Offinso

- Offinsohene

Paramount Chief of Offinso
- Reign: 1935 – 1945
- Enstoolment: 1935
- Predecessor: Nana Kofi Boateng
- Successor: Nana Wiafe Akenten II
- Reign: 1959 – 1966
- Enstoolment: 1959
- Predecessor: Nana Wiafe Akenten II
- Successor: Nana Wiafe Akenten II
- Born: Kwabena Sanwo Ansah; 1905; Offinso, Ashanti Region, Gold Coast (British colony) (now Ghana)
- Died: 13 August 1981 (aged 75–76)
- Spouse: Nana Afia Birago
- Issue: 26 children
- House: Asona
- Education: Accra Academy

Nana Kwabena Wiafe also known as Nana Kwabena Wiafe Ababio or, in private life, Kwabena Sanwo Ansah (1905 – 1981), was a traditional ruler and Omanhene of Offinso Traditional Area. He is known to be the first Offinso royal to be enstooled twice in Offinso history. He reigned from 1935 to 1945 and from 1959 to 1966.

== Early life ==
Wiafe was born in 1905. He received his elementary education at St. Peter's School in Kumasi before continuing his studies at the Accra Academy in Accra for his secondary education. After completion of his schooling, Nana Kwabena Wiafe ventured into the cocoa industry and became a cocoa buying agent at Ashanti Bekwai.

== Reign ==
Wiafe was enstooled as the Omanhene of Offinso in 1935, succeeding Nana Kofi Boateng. Wiafe, however, abdicated in 1945 and was succeeded by Nana Wiafe Akenten II. In 1959, he was re-enstooled as Nana Kwabena Wiafe Ababio following disturbances in Offinso, which led to the de-stoolment of Nana Wiafe Akenten II and the stripping of Offinso of its paramountcy by the then CPP government.

Wiafe was enstooled for a second time when nineteen chiefs convened a meeting in Offinso, during which they collectively passed a resolution urging the CPP government to reinstate Offinso's former status of paramountcy. Wiafe presided over the meeting. In attendance were representatives from the Offinso Youth Association and the Ratepayers Association.

During the meeting, the attendees also supported the council's decision to destool seven wing chiefs within the division. These chiefs were removed from their positions due to their uncooperation with Nana Kwabena Wiafe and for challenging his authority. The affected chiefs included Nana Kwaku Afriyie, the Krontihene; Nana Yaw Akoto, Kyidomhene; Nana Akwasi Amankwa, Nkinkasuhene; and Opanin Kwasi Feh, Odikro of Namong.

The state secretary, Bobie Ansah, had disclosed that copies of the resolution were to be forwarded to CPP leader and Prime Minister, Kwame Nkrumah; his Minister of Justice and Local Government; and the Regional Commissioner for Ashanti. The resolution sent out by the chiefs to reinstate Nana Kwabena Wiafe, the previous occupant of the stool, to his former office was endorsed by the CPP government, which had demoted Wiafe Akenten's status from that of a paramount ruler in 1958.

Following these events, Nana Kwabena Wiafe became known as the first Offinso royal in Offinso's history to be enstooled as Omanhene on two separate occasions.

== Personal life ==
Wiafe was survived by five widows and 26 children. He died on Thursday, 13 August, 1981 and was laid to rest on Friday, 21 August, 1981.
