= MV Globe Star =

History

Singapore
- Name: Burutu Palm (1952); Globe Star (1973)
- Owner: Globe Navigation of Singapore
- Port of registry: Singapore
- Builder: Short Brothers of Sunderland
- Launched: 23 April 1952
- Fate: Ran aground, 4°04′5″S 39°42′01″E

General characteristics
- Tonnage: 5,411 GRT; 8,441 DWT
- Length: 451 ft (137 m)
- Beam: 57 ft (17 m)
- Installed power: 3,000 hp (2,200 kW)
- Propulsion: Doxford 4-cylinder diesel
- Speed: 12 knots (22 km/h; 14 mph)

Globe Star was a cargo ship that ran aground on 27 April 1973 along Nyali Reef, just off Mombasa, Kenya. It was carrying 10,000 tons of wheat bound for Karachi, Pakistan. Despite an intensive salvage operation, the vessel broke in half and was abandoned. In November 1973, five personnel involved in a salvage attempt died in hold No. 3 due to gas poisoning while conducting diving operations. In 1978, the wreck was demolished by Divecon Ltd, Mombasa, leaving the main engine visible and the remains of the ship less than 10 feet (3.0 m) below the surface.

== Building ==
The ship was built as the Burutu Palm for the London-based shipping company Palm Line, trading to and from West Africa and Liverpool. In 1967, it was sold to Greek owners and in 1973 sold to Globe Navigation of Singapore.

== Loss ==
The Globe Star stranding was attributed to a navigation error, in that the ship approached too close to the harbour entrance prior to picking up a pilot, and having been advised to return to the anchorage, turned to starboard instead of port and ran aground.

== Tourism ==
The remains of the Globe Star lie in shallow waters that are well suited to diving. She is a popular recreational scuba diving destination.
