= Midwifery Training School, Offinso =

The Offinso Midwifery Training College is public tertiary health institution in the Offinso in the Ashanti Region of Ghana. The college is in the Offinso Municipality. The Nurses and Midwifery Council (NMC) is the regulates the activities, curriculum and examination of the student nurses and midwives. The council's mandate Is enshrined under section 4(1) of N.R.C.D 117.

== Mission ==
Their mission is to contribute to socio-economic development and the development of local health industry by promoting health and vitality through access to quality health for all people living in Ghana using motivated personnel.

== Vision ==
The school's vission is to let all people in Ghana to have timely access to quality heath services irrespective of the ability to pay at the point of use.

== Goal ==
Their goal is to increase access to quality essential health care and population-based services by 2030.
