= Offinso =

Offinso Offinso New Town
- District Capital
- Location in Ghana
- Coordinates: 6°56′N 1°40′W
- Country: Ghana
- Region: Ashanti Region
- District: Offinso Municipal
- Elevation: 348 ft (106 m)

Offinso is a town in the Offinso Municipality in the Ashanti Region of Ghana. The town is about fifteen minutes drive from Kumasi, the capital of the Ashanti Region; due to Offinso's proximity to Kumasi, many of the Offinso natives have relocated to Kumasi.

The indigenous people are Asante (Asantefoɔ) thus the dominance of Asante Culture in the town.

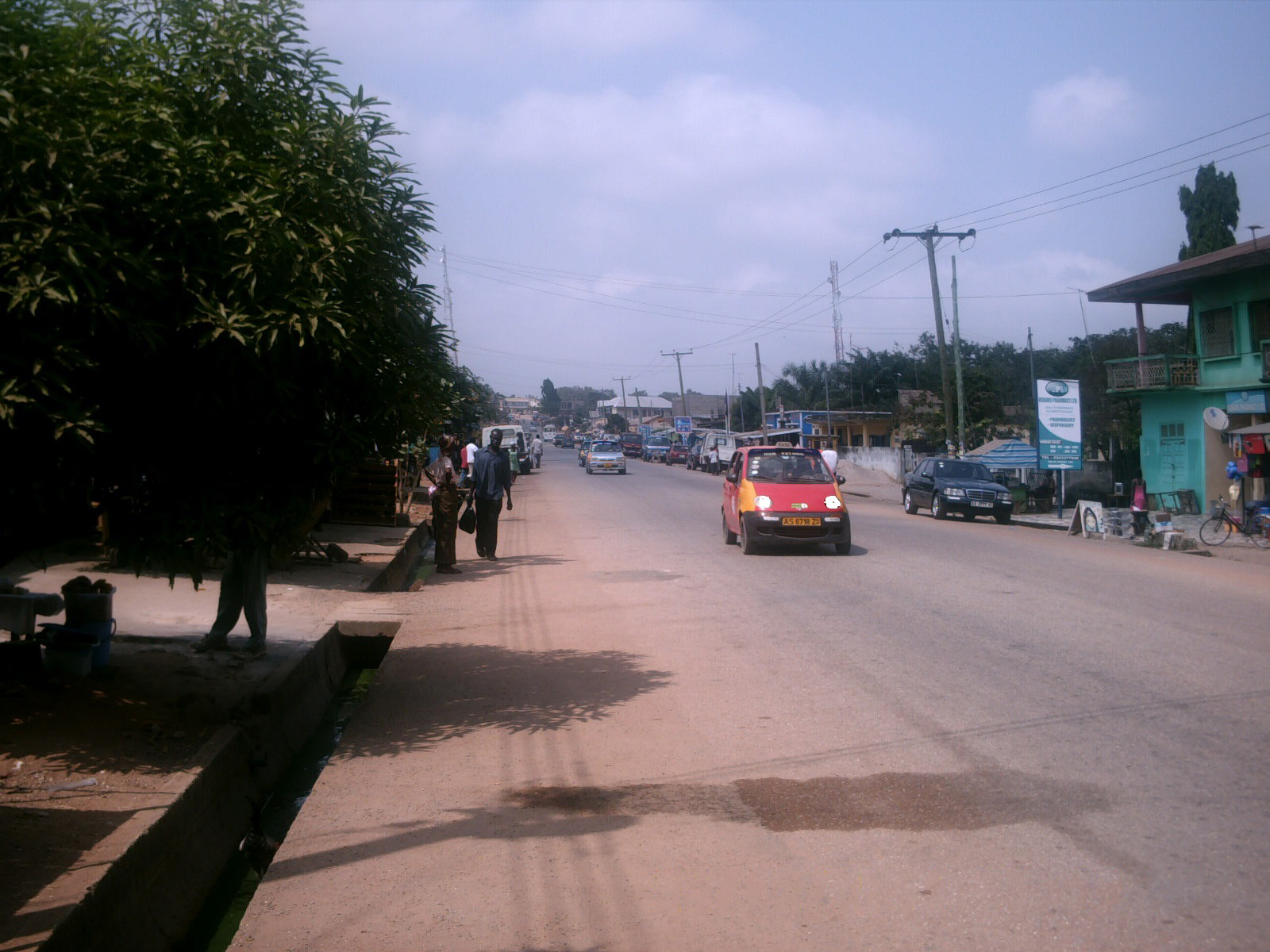
Offinso Street (Old Education)

Offinso is the anglicised version of 'ɔfenso'. The town was named after the River Ofe (ɔfe in Asante) which serves as the boundary for the Offinso South Municipality and Ahenkro, a town in the Afigya Sekyere District also in Ashanti Region.

== History and population ==
The old Offinso District was divided into Offinso South Municipal and Offinso North District with their capitals at New Offinso and Akomadan respectively.

According to the 2021 Population Census in Ghana, 137,272 inhabitants were living in Offinso - most of them being the native Asante people.

In the early 18th century, Offinso played a role in the conquering of Denkyira, Akyem and Bono territory during the great expansion of the Ashanti Empire. The founder and first king of the Ashanti Kingdom, Nana Osei Tutu I rewarded Offinsohene, Nana Wiafe Akenten I with a vast amount of land for his enormous contributions in war. History has it that the vast land was given to the Offinsohene on his request. He wanted nothing but land as his reward for the contributions he made during the war.

Typical of any Akan community, Offinso has a festival called Mmoaninko (Mmoaninkɔ), the festival remembers the great efforts of Nana Wiafe Akenten I and the people of Offinso in war.

== Occupations ==
Most of the inhabitants are farmers whilst others also work as traders, teachers, drivers, doctors, nurses, lawyers, military officers, accountants and others.

Offinso South Municipal is home to four large market centres: Kɔkɔte, Krofrom, Anyinasuso and the Abɔfoɔ (Abofour) markets - people living in and around Offinso bring food items, clothes, shoes and other items to sell during the market days: Sunday, Friday, Tuesday and Thursday respectively.

== Education ==
Offinso has several government-owned and private Primary and Junior High Schools; Offinso is also home to the Offinso Training College (OTC) now Offinso College of Education, Jones Polytechnic, Dwamena Akenten Senior High School, Namong Senior High Technical School, St. Jerome Senior High School, The Bible Baptist Missionary Association of Africa Bible School (Agyeimpra, Offinso) and the St. Patrick's Midwifery Training School (Maase - Offinso). There is also a technical school at Amoawi, a suburb of Offinso.

The University of Education, Winneba has planned to open a campus at Offinso.

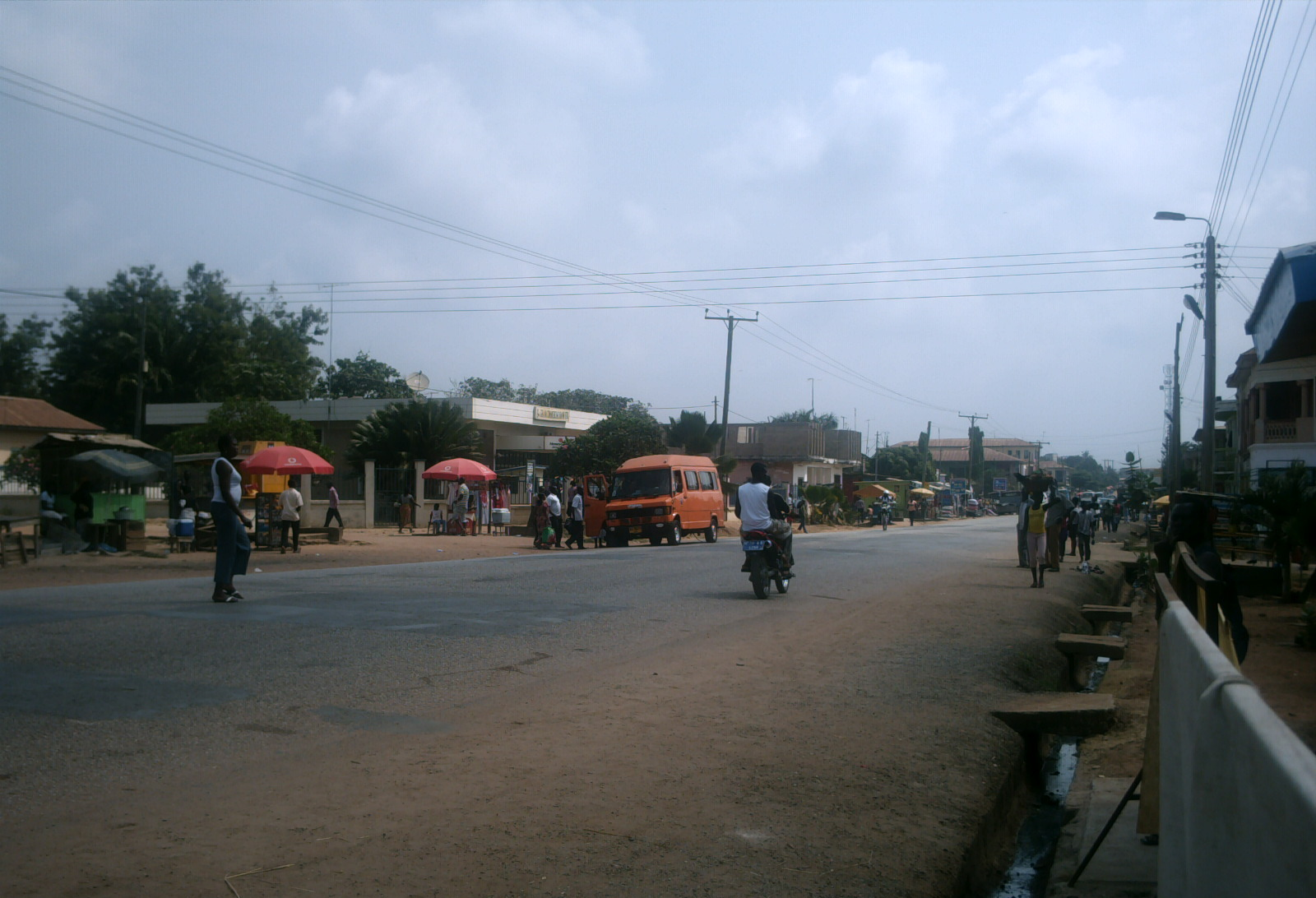
Offinso Krofurom

A two-storey library complex has also been built in Offinso to assist students of this town in their studies.

Some of the Primary and Junior High Schools are Offinso State 'A' JHS (public), OTC JHS (public), Abofour New Life Int. School (Abofour - Offinso), Blessed Child School (private), King Solomon Int. School (private), Offinso State 'B' JHS (public), Offinso State 'C' JHS (public), Immaculate Heart Preparatory (private), Future Island School (private), Osei Sarpong International School (Private), Namong Methodist JHS (Public), Agyeimpra Methodist Primary School (Public), Dominican International School (Private), Old Offinso M/A JHS(Public), etc.

== Politics ==
=== List of traditional rulers ===
The town is ruled by the ɔmanhene (the paramount Chief) and his sub chiefs. Below is the list of rulers of Offinso since its founding in the 16th century.

- Nana Foroben Twea 1540–1556
- Nana Amponsa Kwatia 1556–1580
- Nana Abena Boa ( Woman ) 1580-1630
- Nana Dankwa Gyeawowa 1630–1660
- Nana Dwamena Akenten I 1660–1701
- Nana Wiafe Akenten I (also known as Nana wiafe Kofi or Wiafe Kwagyan.) 1701-1730
- Nana Wiafe Taapem
- Nana Amponsah Akyiano
- Nana Yankyera Korkor
- Nana Naka Abigi
- Nana Gyan Frimpong
- Nana Nyankomago Yaw
- Nana Yaw Ofeh (During his reign, Abofuo Mmie and other gods were founded.)
- Nana Kwaku Dwoma
- Nana Kwadwo Appiasei
- Nana Kwadwo Appiah (also known by the name Nana Kwadwo Kwahu)
- Nana Yaw Berko
- Nana Kofi Kessie
- Nana Kwabena Konadu
- Nana Kwame Duodu
- Nana Kwabena Opoku (Known to have built the Offinso palace at Tutuase.)
- Nana Kofi Boateng (Also known by the name Nana Kofi Minkah.)
- Nana Kwabena Wiafe (Also known by the name Nana Kwabena Sanwo Ansah, he was enstooled twice as Offinsohene.)
- Nana Wiafe Akenten II
- Nana Wiafe Akenten III

=== MPs and MCEs ===
Offinso also has a Municipal Chief Executive who is appointed by the president of Ghana.

The town also has one representative at the Ghana's Parliament - the current MP for Offinso South Constituency is Hon. Ben Abdallah Bandah - he belongs to the New Patriotic Party, NPP.

== Notable people ==
- Dominic Adiyiah (striker, Nakhon Ratchasima and the National Team, Black Stars of Ghana)

== Religion ==
Christianity dominates in this town though there is a significant number of Muslims and Traditional Worshipers in this town.
