= Palm Line =

Former UK-owned Shipping Line - engaged in the West African trade

- Company type: Subsidiary of United Africa Company (UAC)
- Industry: Shipping
- Founded: 1911, as Southern Whaling and Sealing Company Ltd
- Defunct: 1986; 40 years ago
- Successor: Ocean Transport & Trading in 1985
- Headquarters: UAC House, Blackfriars Road, London, United Kingdom
- Area served: Northern Europe, West Africa and Mediterranean
- Key people: Frank Samuel (First Chairman); Lord Cole, Chairman 1952-55
- Parent: Unilever

The Palm Line was a UK-owned shipping line that was engaged in the West African trade from 1949, primarily servicing the ports along 5,000 miles of coastline from Morocco in the north to Angola in the far south. It ceased trading in 1986.

Palm Line was a member of both UK/West Africa Lines Joint Service (UKWAL) and Continent/West Africa Conference (COWAC) together with Elder Dempster, Black Star Line, Nigerian National Shipping Line, Guinea Gulf Line and Norwegian Hoegh Line.

== Background ==
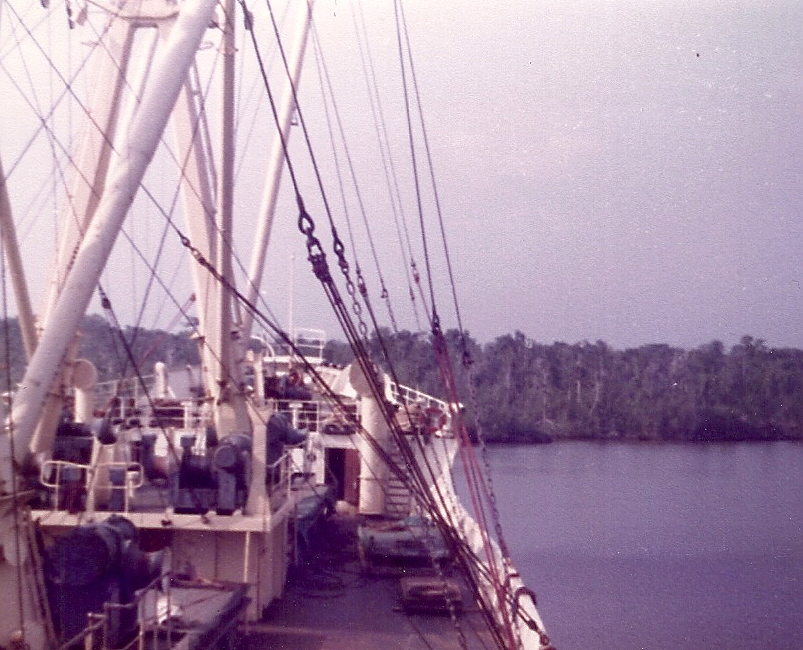
Ilesha Palm navigating the Escravos River to Sapele, Nigeria (1979)

In the post-war period of the late 1940s, UAC decided to divest its shipping fleet to become an independent company in its own right. On 16 February 1949, an extraordinary general meeting of shareholders was held to set up the new company. This was done by reviving the dormant articles of association of the old Southern Whaling and Sealing Company, which Lever Bros. had bought in 1919 then sold to Christian Salvesen Ltd in 1941, and changing the name to Palm Line.

The name of the new company had not been decided upon without considerable discussion. At one stage the name Sun Line had been put forward. It was Mr Frank Samuel, later to become the new company's first chairman who thought of the name 'Palm'.

=== The Creeks ===
It is notable that all Palm Line ships, with the exception of Kano Palm and Katsina Palm, built before 1970 had to be less than 500 feet (150 m) long in order to navigate the creeks of Nigeria. Draught is another important feature. The coast of West Africa is extremely flat, and the slow-moving rivers and tidal currents have combined to build up long sand bars a mile or two off the coast. To enter most of the rivers, ships must pass over these bars; 27 feet (8.2 m) being the maximum draught to serve all ports. Even so, to enter many rivers, - for example the Escravos River which leads to Sapele - ships cannot carry more than 4,000 tons since the maximum draught to successfully make it over the Escravos Bar is limited to 17 feet (5.2 m), so vessels would often cross over the bar at the entrance to the adjacent Forcados River, then take the connecting creek to the Escravos River.

=== Krooboys ===
It was common practice for all vessels to call in at Freetown both south- and northbound to take on both fuel bunkers and 'Krooboys' - additional local West African crew members; their duties being mainly chipping, painting and hold cleaning. They had their own separate accommodation on deck between hatches 1 & 2, with the headman having his own cabin in the fo'c'sle.

Palm Line house flag

=== The End ===
The early 1980s spelled the beginning of the end for Palm Line. From 1982 until 1986 the dramatic drop in Europe / West Africa trade meant the increasing need to charter the vessels out to third parties. Palm Line was sold to Ocean Fleets in 1986. The last Chairman of Palm Lines was Gordon Williams of Pontypool.

=== Emblem ===
The palm tree emblem had already been used on a Unilever Ltd house flag designed in 1939.

=== Merseyside Maritime Museum ===
From Jun-Dec 2018 the museum had a temporary exhibition entitled 'Palm Line - A new company for a new era', with a scale-model of MV Matadi Palm (1970) as its centrepiece.

== The Fleet ==
Ship	Built	Shipyard & Ship Number	IMO Number	Speed (knots)	Type	GRT	Notes
MV Africa Palm	1953	Short Brothers, Pallion - 512	5004075	11	General Cargo	5,415	Sister ship to MV Burutu Palm (1953) Sold in 1972 to Panama and renamed Savoydean; She suffered a fire on 24 July 1975 in Calcutta, and was eventually scrapped in April 1976 at Bombay.
MV Africa Palm	1971	Warnowwerft, Warnemünde - 376	7125328	14	General Cargo	10,008	ex-Joruna; purchased from Johansen & Knutsen, Oslo in 1974 In 1983 chartered and renamed Santa Barbara Pacific, then reverted to Africa Palm later in 1983; Sold in 1984 to Cyprus and renamed Messaria
MV Akassa Palm	1958	Bremer Vulkan, Vegesack - 870	5006712	14	General Cargo	9,000	Sold in 1972 and renamed Elenma Sold in 1977 and renamed Ionian Sky; Sold in 1981 and renamed Magdalini K Scrapped in Nov 1984
MV Andoni Palm	1958	Bremer Vulkan, Vegesack - 869	5016391	14	General Cargo	9,000	Sold in 1976 to Panama and renamed Mastro Manolis Scrapped in Nov 1982
MV Apapa Palm	1973	Stocznia Szczecińska, Gdańsk, Poland - 242	7305801	16	General Cargo	9,417	ex-MV Schauenburg. MV Apapa Palm (9,417 GRT). Laid up on the River Scheldt in Antwerp, May 1982 Bought by Palm Line in 1977 from H. Schuldt (Hamburg) and renamed Apapa Palm. She was fitted with a Sulzer two-stroke diesel engine. She was one of a batch of six sister ships, two of which were the Shonga and Sherbro belonging to Elder Dempster Lines, part of Blue Funnel Line. The Ministry of Defence requisitioned both Shonga & Sherbro for duty in the Falklands War. At the time Apapa Palm was laid up in Antwerp. In 1985 sold to Venezuelan owners and renamed General Salom
MV Ashanti Palm	1947	Shipbuilders Corporation, Newcastle upon Tyne	n/a	10½	General Cargo	5,123	ex-Ashantian Powered by a 3-cyl engine from North-Eastern Marine Engineering Co (1938) Ltd (Wallsend). 18 Nov 1962 sank in Naples harbour where she had arrived from Leghorn to load 400 tons of general cargo. She dragged her anchor in a fierce gale and drifted onto rocks surrounding the breakwater. There were no casualties.
MV Badagry Palm	1956	Swan, Hunter & Wigham Richardson, Neptune Yard, Low Walker - 1928	5033521	14	General Cargo	5,042	Carried Dr. Kwame Nkrumah to London for the Commonwealth Prime Minister's Conference. Powered by a 4500bhp 4-cyl 2-stroke Doxford marine diesel Sold in 1972 to Barada Shipping & Trading Co, Famagusta; renamed Irene's Grace Resold in 1977 to Palineon Shipping Co, Piraeus Broken up in Jun 1981 in Bombay
MV Badagry Palm	1979	Sunderland Shipbuilders, North Sands - 741	7726873	16	General Cargo	12,279	She carried the very last Doxford ship engine ever built; the J-type. In 1985 she was taken over by UAC, who renamed her Badagry. In 1986 she was sold to new owners who registered her in Panama renaming her Cordigliera. Tragically the Cordigliera sank with all (23) hands in very rough weather off Port St Johns, South Africa 31°21′S 30°1′E on 14 Nov 1996, after issuing out a distress to Durban radio at 10:30pm .
MV Bamenda Palm	1956	Swan, Hunter & Wigham Richardson, Neptune Yard, Low Walker - 1926	5035440	14	General Cargo	5,154	MV Bamenda Palm Sold in 1972 to Spetsai Shipping Co Ltd, Famagusta; renamed Lenio. Resold in 1977 to Marlinea Armadora SA, Piraeus, and then again in 1978 to Moineau Cia Naviera SA, Piraeus; renamed ELSA SK. In 1981 renamed Eternal Sea, before being finally scrapped in May 1983.
MV Bamenda Palm	1979	Hyundai Heavy Industries, Ulsan - 1294	7725843	16	General Cargo	11,223	MV Bamenda Palm in Middle Docks, South Shields drydock undergoing conversion to mv Lloyd Texas (1984) Built by Hyundai of South Korea in 1979. On 18 December 1980 she appeared in a front-page article of the UK Sunday Express newspaper under the headline 'Drama At Sea As Gales Sweep Coast'. Bamenda Palm had accidentally rammed a Romanian fish factory ship whilst entering Carrick Roads, Falmouth harbour during the early hours in a southerly force 9 gale. The fish-factory ship was holed just below the water-line midships on the port side by the bulbous bow of the Bamenda Palm. Her Master was George Holeyman. There were no casualties. In May 1984 she was chartered to Lloyd Brasileiro, Rio de Janeiro and renamed Lloyd Texas, whilst in Middle Docks dry dock, South Shields. As Lloyd Texas she sailed from South Shields to Teesport, Middlesbrough to load cement for the new RAF runway in Ascension Island. In 1985 she reverted to Bamenda Palm - from Lloyd Texas - and taken over by UAC. In 1986 she was sold to Cyprus & renamed Arko Glory. She has had several name changes since then, namely, MC Ruby (Jun 1989), Medipas Tide (Jul 1989), MC Ruby (1990), Ville de Damas (Nov 1993), MC Ruby (May 1994), Runner (Sep 1994), CMBT Eagle (Oct 1994), Runner (Jan 1999), Renata (Jun 2000) and finally African Star (Apr-Dec 2005) under the Bahamian flag (Bahamas). She was scrapped at Alang in 2009. The 1996 TV film Deadly Voyage was set on board MC Ruby
SS Benin Palm	1936	Deschimag Seebeck, Bremerhaven - 896	n/a		General Cargo	5,424	ex-Ethiopian Sold in 1959 to Panama (Panama) and renamed Faneromeni, but registered in Lebanon
SS Burutu Palm	1936				General Cargo	5,424	
MV Burutu Palm	1953	Short Brothers, Pallion		12	General Cargo	5,410	Sister ship to MV Africa Palm (1953) Sold in 1967 to Astrocid Naviera of Piraeus and renamed Tyhi; In 1973 she was re-sold to Globe Navigation of Singapore and renamed MV Globe Star. Later that year, 27 Apr 1973, she struck Leven Reef sank off Mombasa and sank. She had been en route from Iskenderun to Karachi.
SS Dahomey Palm	1937	Furness Shipbuilding Company, Haverton Hill	n/a		General Cargo	4,876	ex-Conakrian Sold in 1959 to Wallem & Co., Hong Kong and renamed Southern Mariner. She was finally broken up in 1968.
MV Elmina Palm	1957	Swan, Hunter & Wigham Richardson, Neptune Yard, Low Walker - 1932	5102372	14	General Cargo	5,356	MV Elmina Palm (5,356 GRT). At anchor, Abidjan, Ivory Coast Powered by a 4500bhp 4-cyl Doxford 2-stroke marine diesel. The first British cargo ship to make extensive use of aluminium in her superstructure - which made an extra 55 tons available for cargo deadweight - and later Palm Line ships followed this design. Unlike the other ships built during this period, she was not fitted with 'deep tanks' for the carriage of vegetable oil. Sold in 1977 to Panama and renamed Cyprus Sky
MV Enugu Palm	1958	Swan, Hunter & Wigham Richardson, Neptune Yard, Low Walker - 1948	5104722	14	General Cargo	7,963	Sold in 1978 to Kuwait and renamed Athari
MV Gambia Palm	1937	Deutsche Schiff- und Maschinenbau AG, Wesermünde - 571	n/a		General Cargo	5,452	MV Gambia Palm (1937) on the River Mersey in front of Liverpool's Liver Building Laid down originally as MV Empire Tweed but completed as MV Gambian. Seized in 1941 by Vichy French forces at Dakar, Senegal. Renamed St Gabriel under the Vichy flag. Returned to Britain in 1943, and name returned to MV Gambian, then to MoWT and renamed Empire Tweed. Returned to United Africa Company Ltd in 1946 and again renamed Gambian. Sold in 1949 to Palm Line Ltd and renamed Gambian Palm. Sold in 1959 to E N Vernicos Shipping Co, Greece and renamed Irini’s Blessing, under the flag of Lebanon. Scrapped in July 1963 in Hong Kong.
MV Ibadan Palm	1959	Swan, Hunter & Wigham Richardson, Neptune Yard, Low Walker - 1970	5157767	14	General Cargo	5,658	Sister ship of the Ilorin Palm. She had a 4500bhp 4-cylinder 2-stroke Doxford engine. In 1978 she was sold to Ali Khalifa Mirchandani Shipping Co, Kuwait; renamed Hind; In 1979 she was resold to Al Navigation Ltd, Hong Kong; renamed Arunkamal; In 1980 she was resold to Hind Shipping Co Ltd, Hong Kong; Broken up in 1983
MV Ikeja Palm	1961	Swan, Hunter & Wigham Richardson, Neptune Yard, Low Walker - 1982	5158553	14	General Cargo	5,816	Sister ship of Ilesha Palm. She had a 4-cylinder 2-stroke Doxford engine generating 4500bhp. In 1981 she was sold to Cia Naviera Pancarib SA, Piraeus; renamed GME Palma (registered her in Panama); In 1982 she was resold to Daniko Maritime Co SA, Piraeus; renamed Palma
MV Ilesha Palm	1961	Swan, Hunter & Wigham Richardson, Neptune Yard, Low Walker - 1984	5158785	14	General Cargo	5,816	Sister ship of the Ikeja Palm. She had a 4-cylinder 2-stroke Doxford engine generating 4500bhp. MV Ilesha Palm (1961) In 1979 she was handed over in Bombay & sold to Chaldeos Freighters Ltd of Greece. The new owners registered her in Liberia and renamed her Daphnemar. Laid up at Mini Saqr in February 1982 and sold again to Barnwood Shipping Corp. of Panama., just over two years later she was towed to Karachi for breaking by Abbasi Shipping, arriving in the March 1984.
MV Ilorin Palm	1960	Swan, Hunter & Wigham Richardson, Neptune Yard, Low Walker - 1972	5159105	14	General Cargo	5,658	Sister ship of the Ibadan Palm. She had a 4-cylinder 2-stroke Doxford engine. MV Ilorin Palm (1960) In 1979 she was sold to new owners who registered her in Liberia and renamed her Diamant Captain. Sold in 1982 and renamed twice; first Cape Blanco then Sea Venturer; Scrapped in Dec 1982 in Chittagong
SS Kano Palm	1936	Howaldtswerke, Hamburg	n/a		General Cargo	5,129	ex-Guinean Sold in 1954 to Panama and renamed St.George, but registered in Greece
MV Kano Palm	1958	Swan, Hunter & Wigham Richardson, Neptune Yard, Low Walker - 1946	5181342	14¼	General Cargo	8,734	Sister ship of the Katsina Palm (1957). Powered by a 5600bhp Doxford 5cyl 2-stroke marine diesel Sold in 1979 to Shanti Shipping (Singapore) Pte Ltd; renamed Purna Shanti; Sold again in 1979 to Marvia Shipping Co SA, Panama; renamed Island Trader; Scrapped Sep 1982 in Bombay, India
MV Katsina Palm	1957	Swan, Hunter & Wigham Richardson, Neptune Yard, Low Walker - 1938	5183883	14¼	General Cargo	8,734	Sister ship of the Kano Palm (1958). Powered by a 5600bhp Doxford 5cyl 2-stroke marine diesel Sold in 1978 to Nan Chiao Shipping Pte Ltd, Singapore; renamed New Dragon; Broken up in 1984
SS Kumasi Palm	1943	Furness Shipbuilding Company, Haverton Hill - 351	n/a		General Cargo	7,221	ex-Kumasian Sold in 1960 to Panama and renamed Flower
SS Lagos Palm	1947	Shipbuilders Corporation, Southwick - 11	5261271		General Cargo	5,047	ex-Lagosian In 1960 renamed Oguta Palm then sold in 1964 to Greece and renamed Heraclitos. Then renamed Herodemos in 1969; Eventually broken up in Split in April 1973.
MV Lagos Palm	1961	Swan, Hunter & Wigham Richardson, Neptune Yard, Low Walker - 1980	5202275	16	General Cargo	6,256	MV Lagos Palm leaving Freetown, Sierra Leone in 1979 Sister ship of the Lobito Palm. She had a 6-cylinder 2-stroke Doxford engine generating 7500bhp Sold in 1981 to Lifedream Cia Nav SA, Limassol; renamed City of Lobito Broken up in 1984 after being wrecked in Sep 1983
MV Lagos Palm	1982	Stocznia Szczecińska - 368	7822768	16	General Cargo	15,575	1984 chartered to Lloyd Brasileiro and renamed Lloyd Rio; Sold in 1986 to USSR and renamed Boris Andreyev. In 1996 she was re-sold and became Pearce for a short while, before becoming Nieves B until 2009 under a Spanish flag. In 2009 she was re-sold to Saint Kitts and Nevis and became Ahraf B before being broken up.
MV Lobito Palm	1960	Swan, Hunter & Wigham Richardson, Neptune Yard, Low Walker - 1978	5210143	16	General Cargo	6,256	MV Lobito Palm Sister ship of the Lagos Palm (1961). She had a 6-cylinder 2-stroke Doxford engine generating 7500bhp Sold in 1979 to Cyprus and renamed Lobito Pal. Sold in 1980 to Middle East Maritime Co Ltd. (Piraeus) and renamed Minoa. Sold in 1980 to Minoa Maritime Enterprises Ltd. and renamed Peruvian Trader. In 1982 renamed Richmond. In 1983 renamed Eurco and finally scrapped at Chittagong in 1983
SS Lokoja Palm	1947	Shipbuilding Corporation Ltd, Low Walker - 21	5210973	10½	General Cargo	5,122	ex-Zarian Ordered as Empire Birdsay for the MOWT. A Type-C wartime standard cargo ship. Sold in 1966 to Compagnia Navigazione Kea of Panama; renamed Despina L. In 1969 renamed Nova; registered in Cyprus Broken up in Dec 1971
MV Lokoja Palm	1982	Stocznia Szczecińska - 371	7822770	16	General Cargo	15,576	Spent the majority of her short life with Palm Line chartered to the German company Woermann Line and renamed Wameru In 1984 chartered to Lloyd Brasileiro and renamed Lloyd Australia; Sold in 1986 to USSR and renamed Mekhanik Bardetskiy
MV Makeni Palm	1951	Joseph L. Thompson and Sons, North Sands - 665	5218028		BVOC		ex-British Rover bought from British Petroleum in 1961 as a replacement for MV Opobo Palm Sold in 1967 to Panama and renamed Kerkennah. Sold in 1971 and renamed Palau; Scrapped in Jun 1978 in Brindisi
MV Makurdi Palm	1953	AG Weser Seebeckwerft, Bremerhaven - 743	5218080		BVOC		See MV Tema Palm
MV Matadi Palm	1948	Sir James Laing & Sons, Deptford Yard - 776			BVOC	6,246	ex-Matadian Sold for scrap in February 1963
MV Matadi Palm	1970	Swan Hunter, Haverton Hill - 20	7025243	16	BVOC	13,700	MV Matadi Palm A purpose-built BVOC parcel-tanker 483 ft (147 m) in length, she carried refined vegetable oils, in up to 28 separate tanks, such as rape seed oil from northern Europe to West Africa, and returned with mainly unrefined palm oil or coconut oil. She was built without double-bottoms for the cargo tanks, so although each tank had permanent steam coils installed - in order to maintain the oil at a constant carriage temperature of 96 °F (36 °C), with the temperature being raised to 110 °F (43 °C)-120 °F (49 °C) for discharge. This did not wholly compensate for the lack of a double-bottom and made discharging the unrefined oil in N.Europe during winter time more difficult. Getting the remainder of the expensive oil from the bottom of each tank was an arduous, manual and messy job called "puddling". She had a 4-cylinder 2-stroke Doxford (Type J) engine. Only 483 feet (147 m) long, but with 28 separate tanks to carry several small parcels of oil cargo, for example, groundnut oil, palm kernel oil and palm oil may be shipped in different grades. For a long period in the 1970s, following the 1966 National Union of Seaman strike, all deck crew (not officers) were from Galicia in Spain, rather than from the British Shipping Federation. In 1986 she was taken over by UAC and renamed Matadi. In 1986 she was sold to Troodos Shipping & Trading Co., London and renamed Modesty.
SS Mendi Palm	1936	Deschimag Seebeck, Bremerhaven - 898			General Cargo	5,419	ex-Leonian Sold in 1959 to Panama and renamed Rio Yape
SS Niger Palm	1948	Furness Shipbuilding Company, Haverton Hill - 441			General Cargo	5,202	ex-Nigerian Sold in 1966 to Panama and renamed Triana, but registered in Liberia. She was eventually scrapped in October 1968
MV Oguta Palm	1943	Furness Shipbuilders, Haverton Hill - 352			General Cargo	7,221	ex-Lafian Sold in 1960 to Aristidis SS Co, Piraeues and renamed Aristoteles; She sank on 16 December 1962 off Funchal whilst en route from Detroit to Calcutta.
MV Opobo Palm	1942	Swan, Hunter & Wigham Richardson, Neptune Yard, Low Walker - 1708			BVOC	6,083	ex-Congonian Sold 1961 to Windward Shipping Co., Hong Kong and renamed Winwar; Eventually broken up in June 1963
MV Sapele Palm	1954	AG Weser, Bremerhaven, Germany - 744	5313775		General Cargo		Sailed under the German flag & operated by a subsidiary company Ölhandel-und Transport-Gesellschaft In 1960 transferred to Palm Line (British flag), then in 1966 sold to Panama and renamed Capetan Georgis
MV Takoradi Palm	1937	Deschimag Seebeck, Wesermünde - 572			General Cargo	5,452	ex-Takoradian. Sold in 1959 to Panama and renamed Irini's Luck, but registered in Lebanon. Scrapped in June 1963 at Santander, Spain.
MV Tema Palm	1953	AG Weser Seebeckwerft, Bremerhaven - 743	5218080		BVOC	6,255	Sailed under the German flag & operated by a subsidiary company Ölhandel-und Transport-Gesellschaft 1960 transferred to Palm Line (British flag) and renamed Makurdi Palm, then in 1969 sold to Peru and renamed Santamar. Scrapped in February 1976 at Gadani Beach
SS Volta Palm	1936	Howaldtswerke, Hamburg - 739			General Cargo	5,129	ex-Liberian Sold in 1954 to Finland and renamed Hermes; In 1958 renamed Noemi; Broken up in December 1960 at Yokosuka.

== Bibliography ==
- Kohn, Roger (1970). Palm Line: The Coming of Age 1949–1970. London: Raithby, Lawrence and Company.
- Dunn, Laurence & Heaton, P. M. (1994). Palm Line. Abergavenny, Wales: P.M. Heaton Publishing. ISBN 1-872006-01-9.
