= African & Eastern Trade Corporation =

British colonial-era trading company active in West and Central Africa (1919–1929)

- Type: Limited company
- Industry: Import–export; produce buying; agency services
- Predecessor: African Association Ltd; Miller Brothers (Liverpool) Ltd; F. & A. Swanzy Ltd
- Founded: 20 May 1919
- Fate: Merged with Niger Company to form the United Africa Company (1929)
- Successor: United Africa Company (UAC)
- Headquarters: Liverpool, United Kingdom
- Area served: West and Central Africa

The African & Eastern Trade Corporation (A&ETC) was a British trading company created in 1919 in Liverpool through the merger of the African Association Ltd, Miller Brothers (Liverpool) Ltd, and F. & A. Swanzy Ltd. It operated an extensive produce-buying and import–export network across British West Africa and parts of Central Africa. In 1929 the company merged with the Niger Company to form the United Africa Company (UAC), which subsequently became a subsidiary within Unilever.

It served in the Congo side by side with the British Consulate as a semi-official representative for British trading interests in that Colony. Both Huileries du Congo Belge (HCB) and the African and Eastern Trade Corporation employed a number of English-speaking employees of both European and African origin. In 1929 the corporation merged with the Royal Niger Company (both owned by Lever Brothers) forming a new trading enterprise, the United Africa Company Limited (UAC).

The African and Eastern Trading Corporation was also a large share owner in the Ashanti goldfield in the Gold Coast, as well it had a shipping line. By 1930 the merged United Africa Company was having financial difficulty and had suffered large losses, mainly because of the African and Eastern Trade Corporation component being unable to bear its half-share of the UAC losses. By this time the parent company Lever Brothers had amalgamated with the Margarine Union to form the company known as Unilever. Unilever came to the rescue with millions of pounds, in return for which Unilever took over the conglomerate of companies.

== History ==
During the late nineteenth and early twentieth centuries, several Liverpool- and London-based firms dominated British trade on the West African coast. Among these were the African Association Ltd (formed 1889 as a merger of multiple coastal houses), Miller Brothers (Liverpool) Ltd, and F. & A. Swanzy Ltd. In the immediate aftermath of the First World War - partly in response to intensifying competition and rising capital requirements—these firms consolidated as the African & Eastern Trade Corporation on 20 May 1919. The company was registered and headquartered in Liverpool.

=== Operations in West and Central Africa ===
A&ETC acted as a produce buyer (palm products, cocoa, groundnuts, and other tropical commodities) and as an importing agency for British and other manufactured goods, operating agencies and depots in major ports and river stations across British West Africa and parts of Central Africa.

=== Merger into the United Africa Company (1929) ===
In 1929 A&ETC merged with the Niger Company to create the United Africa Company (UAC). The merger formed part of a wider consolidation of British trading interests in Africa during the interwar years. The UAC soon came under the control of the newly formed Unilever group in the early 1930s, and operated thereafter as a major Unilever subsidiary in Africa.

== See also ==
- United Africa Company
- Royal Niger Company
- Colonial Nigeria
- History of Ghana
