= SS Lokoja Palm =

British-built steam powered cargo vessel

History
- Name: Zarian (1947–49); Lokoja Palm (1949–66); Despina L (1966–69); Nova (1969–71)
- Owner: United Africa Co Ltd (1947–49); Palm Line Ltd (1949–66); Compagnia Navigazione Kea (1966–69); Nova Shipping Co Ltd (1969–71)
- Operator: United Africa Co Ltd (1947–49); Palm Line Ltd (1949–66); Compagnia Navigazione Kea (1966–69); Pergamos Shipping Co Ltd (1969–71)
- Port of registry: United Kingdom (1947–66); Panama (1966–69); Cyprus (1969–71)
- Ordered: 1947
- Builder: Shipbuilding Corporation Ltd, Low Walker
- Yard number: 21
- Laid down: 1947
- Launched: 15 August 1947
- Completed: December 1947
- Fate: Scrapped December 1971

General characteristics
- Type: General Cargo
- Tonnage: 7,369 GRT, 4,207 NRT
- Length: 447.9 feet (136.5 m)
- Beam: 56.4 feet (17.2 m)
- Draught: 24.2 feet (7.4 m)
- Propulsion: Hick, Hargreaves Triple expansion engine
- Speed: 10.5 knots (19.4 km/h)

Lokoja Palm was a 7,369 GRT cargo steamship built by Shipbuilding Corporation Ltd, Low Walker, in 1947. She was laid down as Empire Birdsay and launched as Zarian. In 1949 she was sold and renamed Lokoja Palm. Towards the end of her career she was sold and renamed Despina L and then Nova registered in Cyprus, being scrapped in December 1971 in Shanghai.

== Description ==
Empire Birdsay was ordered by the Ministry of War Transport but the war ended before she was completed. She was built by Shipbuilding Corporation Ltd, Newcastle upon Tyne. She was yard number 21 and was launched as Zarian on 16 August 1947 with completion in December.

== Career ==
Zarian was owned and operated by the United Africa Co Ltd. In 1949, the company became Palm Line Ltd and she was renamed Lokoja Palm. On 16 December 1954, Lokoja Palm arrived at Avonmouth, Somerset with a cargo including 40 animals destined for London Zoo. Lokoja Palm served with Palm Line for seventeen years and was sold in 1966 to Compagnia Navigazione Kea, Panama and renamed Despina L. In 1969, she was sold to Nova Shipping Co Ltd, Cyprus and renamed Nova. She was operated under the management of Pergamos Shipping Co Ltd. Nova was scrapped in China in December 1971.

== Propulsion ==
The ship was propelled by a Hick, Hargreaves & Co. Ltd Triple expansion steam engine, she was capable of 10.5 knots (19.4 km/h).
