= List of Empire ships (Si–Sy) =

== Suffix beginning with e ==
=== Empire Sidney ===
Empire Sidney was a 6,904 GRT cargo ship which was built by Harland & Wolff Ltd, Belfast. Launched on 4 September 1941 and completed in May 1942. Allocated in 1943 to the Dutch government and renamed Van der Helst. Sold in 1946 to Koninklijke Java-China-Japan Lijn, Netherlands and renamed Tjimenteng. Sold in 1963 to Diamandis Eikidi Naftiliaki Eteria and renamed Diamandis. Operated under the management of A Halcoussis & Co, Greece. Arrived on 20 January 1970 at Cartagena, Spain for scrapping.

=== Empire Silas ===
Empire Silas was a 275 GRT tug which was built by Cochrane & Sons Ltd, Selby. Launched on 13 December 1943 and completed in April 1944. Sold in 1946 to Fairplay Towing & Shipping Co Ltd, London and renamed Fairplay Two. Capsized on 22 June 1947 and sank off Vlissingen, Netherlands when towing Kuurtanes. Refloated on 13 August 1947 and towed to Antwerp, Belgium. Declared a constructive total loss but repaired. Sold in 1948 to Société Cherif de Remorquage et Sauvetage, Casablanca and renamed Ifrane. Scrapped in 1978 at Casablanca.

=== Empire Silver (I) ===
Empire Silver was an 8,145 GRT tanker which was built by Blythswood Shipbuilding Co Ltd, Glasgow. Launched on 19 October 1940 and completed in January 1941 as RFA Denbydale for the Royal Fleet Auxiliary. Damaged on 19 September 1941 at Gibraltar by a limpet mine laid by Italian submarine Scirè. Her back was broken and she was relegated to a fuelling hulk at Gibraltar. Her engines were removed and fitted in RFA Derwentdale. Arrived on 22 July 1957 at Blyth, Northumberland for scrapping.

=== Empire Silver (II) ===
Empire Silver was an 8,602 GRT tanker which was built by Sir J. Laing & Sons, Sunderland. Launched on 28 November 1940 and completed in March 1941. Sold in 1946 to Northern Petroleum Tankship Co. Ltd. and renamed Sylvafield. Sold in 1952 to Castro Bello Compagnia Armadora S.A., Panama and renamed Radiant. Renamed Andros Sun in 1957. Sold to Star Lane Shipping Co. Inc., Panama in 1958 and renamed Capetan Theo. Arrived at Split for breaking on 14 November 1960.

=== Empire Simba ===
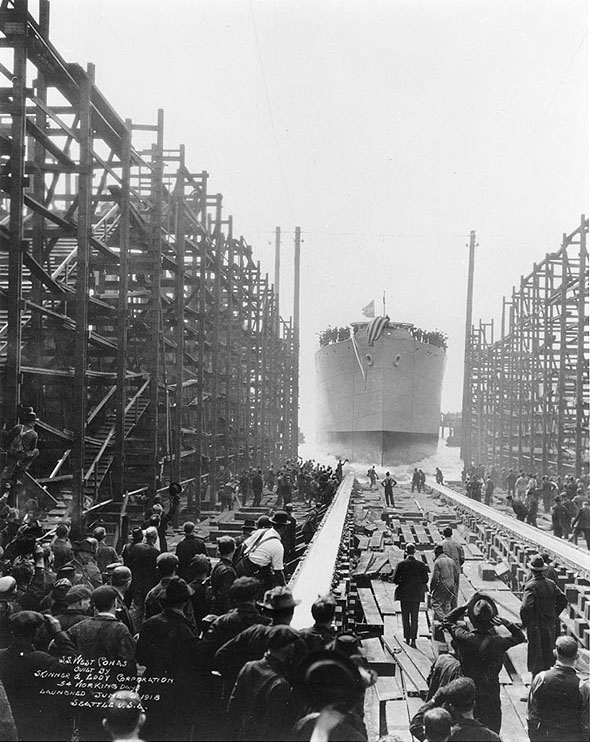
Launch of West Cohas

Empire Simba was a 5,647 GRT cargo ship which was built by Skinner & Eddy Corp, Seattle. Completed in 1918 as West Cohas for the United States Shipping Board (USSB). To Lykes Brothers-Ripley Steamship Co Inc in 1933. To MoWT in 1940 and renamed Empire Simba. Damaged on 1 March 1941 by bombing in the Irish Sea (52°21′N 05°23′W) and abandoned. Towed to Liverpool. On 12 March a parachute mine was discovered onboard after an air raid. This exploded on 14 March, damaging her amidships, later repaired. Scuttled on 13 September 1945 at 55°30′N 11°00′W with a cargo of obsolete chemical ammunition.

=== Empire Simon ===
Empire Simon was a 275 GRT tug which was built by Cochrane & Sons Ltd, Selby, Launched on 11 July 1945 and completed in July 1946 as Simonia for Overseas Towage & Salvage Co Ltd. Sold in 1951 to Les Abeilles Remorquage et Sauvetage, Le Havre and renamed Abeille No 8. Sold in 1966 to G D'Alessio, Italy and renamed Antonia D'Alessio. Sold in 1975 to Rim. Calabrese SpA, Italy and renamed Grecale.

=== Empire Sinew ===
Empire Sinew was a 250 GRT tug which was built by Scott & Sons Ltd, Bowling, West Dunbartonshire. Launched on 14 July 1942 and completed in November 1942. Sold in 1948 to Union des Remorquage de L'Ocean, Dakar and renamed Faidherbe. Sold in 1954 to Adelaide Steamship Company. Left Cape Town on 24 October 1954 and last reported on 26 October in distress off Cape Agulhas. Foundered with loss of all hands.

=== Empire Singapore ===
Empire Singapore was a 7,381 GRT cargo ship which was built by William Doxford & Son Ltd, Sunderland. Launched on 15 November 1944 and completed in March 1945. Sold in 1946 to Reardon Smith Line Ltd and renamed Fresno City. Sold in 1964 to Vergocean Steamship Co Ltd and renamed Sea Captain. Operated under the management of Vergottis Ltd, London. Scrapped in June 1975 in Shanghai.

=== Empire Skipper ===
Empire Skipper was a 313 GRT coaster which was built by Richard Dunston Ltd, Thorne. Launched on 23 August 1943 and completed in October 1943. Sold in 1947 to South Coast Sand & Gravel Ltd, converted to a sandsucker and renamed Sand Skipper. Sold in 1950 to Zinal Steamship Co Ltd. Operated under the management of J Burness & Sons Ltd. sold in 1954 to South Coast Shipping Co Ltd. Operated under the management of Burness Shipping Co Ltd, London. Management passed in 1956 to William Cory & Son. Scrapped in July 1970 at Southampton.

=== Empire Skua ===
Empire Skua was an 8,400 GRT LST (3) which was built by Yarrows Ltd, Esquimalt, British Columbia. Launched in September 1945 as LST 3517. To Royal Navy as HMS St Nazaire. To Ministry of Transport in 1956 and renamed Empire Skua. Operated under the management of Atlantic Steam Navigation Co Ltd. In 1961, management passed to British India Steam Navigation Co Ltd. Arrived on 31 January 1968 at Spezia, Italy for scrapping.

In 1962, the Empire Skua undertook to tow a military "heavy ferry"—a 4 × 4 cell pontoon platform with fold-back ramps on both ends—from Cyprus to Benghazi, Libya to take part in military exercises. En route, one of the pontoons sprung a hefty leak, and the platform began to sink. The problem was not spotted until daybreak about halfway through the trip when the tow rope started to "sing" indicating it was under considerable stress and tension. Before it could be cut loose, it snapped and the ship-half of the tow wrapped itself around the accommodation block, before it disappeared to the bottom of the Mediterranean Sea, a sequence of photographs were taken as proof that the ferry had sunk.

=== Empire Sky ===
Empire Sky was a 7,455 GRT cargo ship which was built by J L Thompson & Sons Ltd, Sunderland. Launched on 10 February 1941 and completed in June 1941. Torpedoed on 14 November 1942 and sunk by U-625 at 76°20′N 32°26′W.

=== Empire Sloane ===
Empire Sloane was a 419 GRT coaster which was built by Shipbuilding Corporation, Newcastle upon Tyne. Launched on 17 January 1946 and completed later that year. Sold in 1948 to Broadway Holdings Ltd, London. To London Missionary Society later that year and converted to a missionary ship and renamed John Williams VI, the sixth of seven missionary ships successively operated by the Society, named after the missionary John Williams. Sold in 1963 to Burns, Philip & Co Ltd, London and renamed Manutai. She was used as a trading vessel in the New Hebrides (Vanuatu) carrying general cargo from Port Vila and collecting copra for export from plantations and co-operative groups. She also had an on-board store for the sale of domestic goods and groceries, including frozen food. Sold in 1975 to Rabi Holdings Ltd, London.

=== Empire Snipe ===
Empire Snipe was a 2,689 GRT cargo ship which was built by Manitowoc Shipbuilding Corp, Manitowoc, Wisconsin. Completed as Lake Gaither for the USSB. Sold in 1926 to Western Reserve Navigation Co Inc, Cleveland, Ohio. Sold in 1927 to Newtex Steamship Corp, New York. Renamed Texas Ranger in 1932. To MoWT in 1940 and renamed Empire Snipe. Damaged on 14 July 1942 by a limpet mine off Gibraltar. Out of service until 14 October 1942 when repairs completed. First British or allied ship to enter Bizerta on 13 May 1943 after its capture by the American 2nd corps. Sold in 1946 to W Brown, Atkinson & Co Ltd and renamed Staxton. Sold in 1948 to Sirketi Aldikacti, Turkey and renamed Ileri. Scrapped in July 1968 at Haliç, Turkey.

=== Empire Snow ===
Empire Snow was a 6,327 GRT cargo ship which was built by C Connell & Co Ltd, Glasgow. Launched on 16 December 1940 and completed in February 1941. Sold in 1946 to Cairns, Noble & Co Ltd and renamed Cairnavon. Sold in 1961 to Compagnia Naviagzione Sirikari, Panama and renamed Vergolivada. Operated under the Lebanese Flag. On 19 September 1966 she became stranded on the Dognarslan Bank, Dardanelles after a rope became wrapped around her propeller. Part of her cargo of rocks was jettisoned but this was stopped as an artificial reef was being created. The remaining cargo was transhipped and Vergolivada was refloated on 1 October 1966. Arrived in November 1968 in Shanghai for scrapping.

=== Empire Snowdrop ===
Empire Snowdrop was a 339 GRT coaster which was built by Van Diepen Scheepswerf Gebroeders NV, Waterhuizen, Netherlands. Completed in 1939 as Caribe I for S G Hallstrom, Amsterdam. Requisitioned by MoWT in 1940 and renamed Empire Snowdrop. Sold in 1946 to Malta Steamship Co Ltd, Valletta and renamed De Vilhena after the 18th-century grandmaster. Foundered on 3 February 1961 40 nautical miles (74 km) north-west of Calvi, Corsica.

=== Empire Soar ===
Empire Soar was a 2,740 GRT cargo ship that was built by Blyth Shipbuilding & Drydock Co Ltd. Completed in 1924 as Tullochmoor for W Runciman & Co. Sold in 1936 to Franz L Nimitz, Stettin. Seized in May 1945 at Hamburg as a war prize. To MoWT and renamed Empire Soar. Allocated in 1946 to Greece. To the Greek government and renamed Preveza. Sold in 1948 to Synodinos Brothers, Greece and renamed Danapris. Sold in 1957 to A. Angelicoussis & Co, Greece and renamed Armonia. Bombed in 1958 by a CIA aircraft in an air raid on Amboina. Sold in 1959 to Keanyew Shipping Co, Panama and renamed Keanyew. Sold in 1960 to Southern Commercial Co, Panama and renamed Charlie. Scrapped in January 1960 at Hong Kong.

=== Empire Soldier ===
Empire Soldier was a 4.536 GRT cargo ship which was built by Lithgows Ltd, Port Glasgow. Completed in 1928 as Aelybryn. Sold in 1937 to Fisser & Van Doornum, Emden and renamed Konsul Hendrik Fisser. When war broke out she was at Vigo, Spain. She sailed flying a false Norwegian Flag and with Norwegian colours painted on her hull. Sighted on 22 November 1939 by HMS Calypso north of the Faroe Islands. Weather too rough for a boarding party and crew unable to scuttle and abandon her for some reason. Escorted towards land under threat of sinking. Captured on 23 November. To MoWT and renamed Empire Soldier. Collided on 16 September 1942 with tanker F. J. Wolfe off St John's, Newfoundland and sank.

=== Empire Song ===
Empire Song was a 9,228 GRT cargo liner which was built by Greenock Dockyard Co, Greenock. Launched on 18 June 1940 and completed in October 1940. Struck an Italian mine on 9 May 1941 in the Strait of Sicily and sank at the position 37°9′12″N 11°1′24″E while member of Convoy WS 58 as part of Operation Tiger.

=== Empire Sophy ===
Empire Sophy was a 261 GRT tug which was built by Goole Shipbuilding and Repairing Co Ltd, Goole. Launched on 13 December 1943 and completed in June 1944. To the Admiralty in 1947 and renamed Behest. Sold in 1957 to Colombo Port Authority, Ceylon. Reported to have sunk at Colombo Harbour at an unknown date.

=== Empire Sorcerer ===
Empire Sorcerer was a 2,594 GRT hopper dredger which was built by Ferguson Brothers, Port Glasgow. Launched on 21 February 1946 and completed in April 1946. Sold in 1947 to the Argentinian government and renamed M O P 230-C. Renamed Miguel Miranda in 1949 and renamed M O P 224-C in 1958.

=== Empire Sound ===
Empire Sound was a 325 GRT coaster which was built by Richards Ironworks Ltd, Lowestoft. Launched on 8 August 1941 and completed in December 1941. To the Dutch government in 1943 and renamed Zuiderhaven. Sold in 1946 to Entreprise Générale de Transport Maritimes SA, France and renamed Tamise II. Sold in 1950 to Société Anonyme de Ciments de Dannes, France and renamed Cimcour II. Sold in 1953 to A/S Sjaholm, Norway and renamed Sjaholm. New diesel engine fitted in 1958. Sold in 1965 to A Remoy Partrederi, Norway and renamed Pokal. Sold in 1968 to I/S Peddership-Pedersen & Sonner, Norway and renamed Bjerkosund. Sold in 1972 to Nesser R/A, Norway and renamed Eidsvag. Sold in 1983 to G Mallion, London and sold in 1985 to Nick Ocean International, Panama.

=== Empire Southey ===
Empire Southey was a 7,041 GRT cargo ship which was built by Short Brothers Ltd, Sunderland. Launched on 15 May 1942 and completed in July 1942. Sold in 1946 to Bank Line Ltd and renamed Hollybank. Operated under the management of A Weir & Co Ltd. Sold in 1953 to Halcyon Lijn NV, Netherlands and renamed Stad Rotterdam. Sold in 1963 to Ocean Shipping & Enterprises SA, Panama and renamed Ocean Unity. Arrived on 8 March 1967 at Kaohsiung, Taiwan for scrapping.

=== Empire Southwark ===
Empire Southwark was a 3,486 GRT cargo ship which was built by William Gray & Co Ltd, West Hartlepool. Launched on 11 June 1945 and completed in September 1945. Sold in 1946 to Pelton Steamship Co Ltd, Newcastle upon Tyne and renamed Tempo. Sold in 1961 to Anemi Compagnia Navigazione, Panama and renamed Nagusena. Sank on 17 October 1967 4 nautical miles (7.4 km) off Esbjerg, Denmark.

=== Empire Southwold ===
Empire Southwold was a 7,370 GRT cargo ship which was built by Bartram & Sons Ltd, Sunderland. Launched on 16 January 1946 and completed in May 1946 as Hesperia for Houston Line Ltd. Sold in 1960 to Clan Line Steamers Ltd and renamed Clan Murdoch. Sold in 1961 to King Line Ltd. Operated under the management of Dodd, Thompson & Co Ltd. sold in 1962 to Sadikzade Denizcilik Ltd, Turkey and renamed Mustafa. Sold in 1974 to Z Sonmez, Turkey and renamed Denizhanlar. Scrapped in March 1979 at Aliağa, Turkey.

=== Empire Spartan ===
Empire Spartan was a 6,987 GRT cargo ship which was built by Lithgows Ltd, Port Glasgow. Launched on 17 February 1942 and completed in April 1942. Sold in 1951 to Ellerman & Bucknall Steamship Co Ltd and renamed City of Cardiff. Sold in 1959 to Kam Kee Navigation Co Ltd and renamed Shun Wing. Operated under the management of Jebshun Shipping Co Ltd, Hong Kong. Sold in 1971 to Chun Moo Choo, operated under the Somali flag and Jebshun's management. Arrived in January 1972 in Hong Kong after being detained in Onahama, Japan following the bankruptcy of her owners and laid up. On 10 May 1972, she dragged her anchors and collided with ferry Macau. Arrived on 23 September 1972 at Kaohsiung, Taiwan for scrapping.

=== Empire Spearhead ===
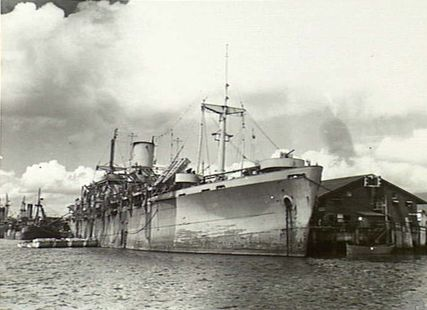
Empire Spearhead

Empire Spearhead was a 7,177 GRT (11,600 tons displacement) Type C1-S-AY-1 cargo ship which was built by Consolidated Steel Corp, Wilmington, California. Laid down as Cape Girardeau and completed in January 1944 as Empire Spearhead for MoWT. To United States Maritime Commission in 1947, renamed Cape Girardeau in 1948. Proposed sale in May 1948 to China and renaming Hai Mei was cancelled. Renamed Empire Spearhead in August 1950 and laid up in the James River. Scrapped in November 1966 in Baltimore, Maryland.

=== Empire Spenser ===
Empire Spenser was an 8,194 GRT tanker which was built by Harland & Wolff Ltd, Belfast. Launched on 17 February 1942 and completed in July 1942. Torpedoed on 8 December 1942 and sunk by U-524 at 57°04′N 36°01′W.

=== Empire Spey ===
Empire Spey was a 4,292 GRT cargo ship which was built by Ardrossan Dockyard Co Ltd, Ardrossan. Completed in 1929 as Blairspey for Geo Nisbet & Co, Glasgow. Torpedoed on 18 October 1940 byU-101 at 57°55′N 11°10′W while a member of Convoy SC 7. Abandoned, torpedoed again on 19 October by U-100. Taken in tow and beached in the Clyde on 25 October. Later towed to Greenock and a new bow section was built. To MoWT in 1942 and renamed Empire Spey. Reverted to George Nisbet & Co in 1946 and renamed Blairspey. Sold in 1961 to Marfuente Compagnia Navigazione, Lebanon and renamed Evandros. Scrapped in May 1967 at Spezia, Italy.

=== Empire Spinel ===
Empire Spinel was a 650 GRT coaster which was built by Henry Robb Ltd, Leith. Completed in 1937 as Spinel for William Robertson, Glasgow. Bombed on 21 May 1940 by German aircraft and sunk at Dunkerque. Salvaged on 4 July by Germany, repaired and entered service. Seized in May 1945 at the Channel Islands. To MoWT and renamed Empire Spinel. Returned to William Robertson in 1946 and was renamed Spinel. Scrapped in April 1970 at Dalmuir, West Dunbartonshire.

=== Empire Spinney ===
Empire Spinney was an 872 GRT coaster which was built by A & J Inglis Ltd, Glasgow. Launched on 26 June 1941 and completed in September 1941. Sold in 1946 to General Steam Navigation Co Ltd and renamed Peregrine. Sold in 1965 to D Vassilatos & others, Greece and renamed Libya. Sold later that year to Elias Condos & others, Greece. Sold in 1971 to S Kondopoulos & Co, Greece and renamed Rozmary.

=== Empire Spitfire ===
Empire Spitfire was a 235 GRT tug which was built by A Hall & Co Ltd, Aberdeen. Launched on 23 January 1943 and completed in April 1943. To the Admiralty in 1947 and renamed Warden. Renamed Prompt in 1951. Sold in 1975 to Thames Services Ltd, London and renamed Torque. Sold in 1979 to Shoreham Salvage & Marine Ltd, Shoreham, West Sussex. Sold in 1982 to Maryport Maritime Museum, Maryport, Cumbria. Scrapped in 1986 in Millom, Cumbria.

=== Empire Splendour ===
Empire Splendour was a 7,335 GRT cargo ship which was built by Harland & Wolff Ltd, Belfast. Launched on 18 December 1941 and completed in September 1942. Sold in 1946 to Ocean Steamship Co Ltd and renamed Medon. Operated under the management of A Holt & Co Ltd. Sold in 1963 to Olistim Navigation Co SA, Greece and renamed Tina. Scrapped in January 1970 in Shanghai.

=== Empire Sportsman ===
Empire Sportsman was a 325 GRT coaster which was built by Richards Ironworks Ltd, Lowestoft. Launched on 6 May 1943 and completed in September 1943. Sold in 1946 to R Rix & Sons Ltd, Hull and renamed Norrix. New diesel engine fitted in 1961, sold in 1963 to Odysseas & Charalabous, Greece and rename Ionion. Sold later that year to N T Giannoutsos, Greece. Scrapped in May 1985 in Perama, Greece.

=== Empire Spray ===
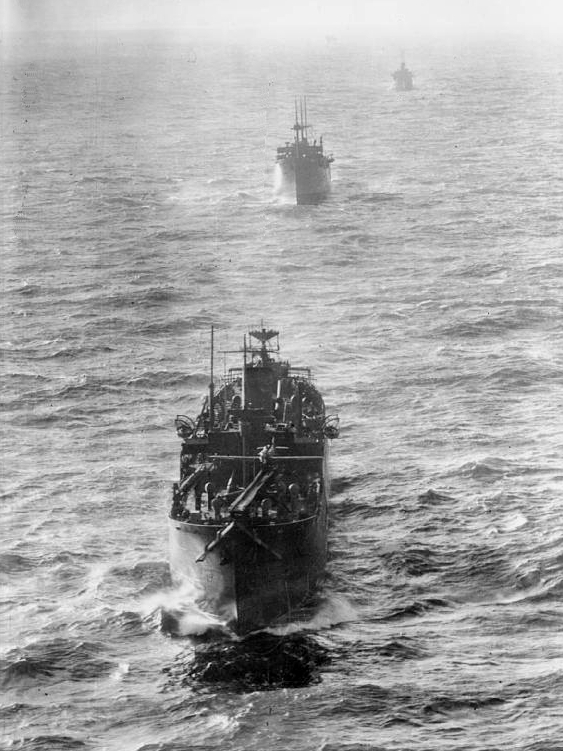
Empire Spray

Empire Spray was a 7,308 CAM ship which was built by William Doxford & Sons Ltd, Sunderland. Launched on 11 February 1941 and completed in May 1941. Allocated in 1943 to the Dutch government and renamed Gerard Dou. Sold in 1947 to Stoomvaart Maatschappij NV, Rotterdam and renamed Marken. Sold in 1953 to Douglas Steamship Co Ltd and renamed Inchmull. Operated under the management of Williamson & Co Ltd, Hong Kong. Management passed in 1966 to Mullion & Co, Hong Kong. Scrapped in February 1969 at Kaohsiung, Taiwan.

=== Empire Spring ===
Empire Spring was a 6,946 GRT CAM ship which was built by Lithgows Ltd, Port Glasgow. Launched on 8 March 1941 and completed in June 1941. Torpedoed on 14 February 1942 and sunk by U-576 in the North Atlantic.

=== Empire Springbuck ===
Empire Springbuck was a 5,591 GRT cargo ship which was built by the Ames Shipbuilding and Drydock Company, Seattle. Ordered as War Dido for the British Shipping Controller and completed in October 1918 as Westmead for the USSB. To Strand Steamship Co, New York in 1920, returned to USSB in 1921. To Williams Steamship Co Inc, New York in 1927 and renamed Willanglo. To Babcock Steamship Corp, New York in 1928 and then to Pacific-Atlantic Steamship Company, Portland, Oregon in 1929. To MoWT in 1940 and renamed Empire Springbuck. Torpedoed on 19 September 1941 by U-81 off Cape Farewell, Greenland and sank at 61°38′N 40°40′W.

=== Empire Springfjord ===
Empire Springfjord was a 2,036 GRT cargo ship that was built by Trondheim Mekaniske Verksted, Trondheim. Launched in 1939 as Springfjord for Springwell Shipping Co Ltd, London. Seized by Germany and completed in 1940 for "Hansa Line" as Rüdesheimer. Seized in May 1945 at Tønsberg. To MoWT and renamed Empire Springfjord. To Springwell Shipping Co Ltd, London in 1947 and renamed Springfjord. Napalmed by CIA "Liberation Air Force" on 27 June 1954 at Puerto San José, Guatemala during the 1954 Guatemalan coup d'état, burned and sunk.

=== Empire Sprite ===
Empire Sprite was a 244 GRT tug which was built by Henry Scarr Ltd, Hessle. Launched on 17 February 1942 and completed in June 1942. To the French government in 1946 and renamed Inflexible. Sold in 1951 to Les Abeilles Remorquage et Sauvetage, Le Havre and renamed Abeille No 23. Sold in 1961 to Società di Navigazione Capieci, Italy and renamed Capo Milazzo. Reported to have been scrapped in 1979 at Augusta, Sicily.

=== Empire Spruce ===
Empire Spruce was a 129 GRT tug which was built by R Dunston Ltd, Thorne. Launched on 13 January 1942 and completed in March 1942. In a collision on 9 January 1943 with a Royal Navy ship at the entrance to Gareloch and sank. Refloated on 24 February 1943, towed to Glasgow and repaired. To the Admiralty in 1947 and renamed Emulous. Sold in 1958 to H G Pounds, Portsmouth. Sold in 1961 to J D Irving Ltd, Canada, a new diesel engine was fitted and she was renamed Irving Oak.

=== Empire Squire ===
Empire Squire was a 7,044 GRT cargo ship which was built by John Readhead & Sons Ltd, South Shields. Launched on 4 November 1941 and completed in January 1942. Allocated in 1943 to the Greek government and renamed Makedonia. Sold in 1947 to A G Pappadakis, Greece. Sold in 1962 to Compagnia Navigazione y de Comercio Adonis Ltd, Costa Rica and renamed Anthas. Arrived on 23 June 1967 at Shanghai for scrapping.

=== Empire Stalwart ===
Empire Stalwart was a 7,045 GRT cargo ship which was built by William Gray & Co Ltd, West Hartlepool. Launched on 23 March 1943 and completed in May 1943. Sold in 1946 to Alexander Shipping Co Ltd and renamed Easbury. Operated under the management of Houlder Bros & Co Ltd, London. Sold in 1968 to Transportes Maritimos Mexicanos SA, Mexico and renamed Constitucion. Scrapped in October 1968 at Veracruz, Mexico.

=== Empire Standard ===
Empire Standard was a 7,050 GRT cargo ship which was built by Sir W G Armstrong Whitworth & Co (Shipbuilders) Ltd, Newcastle upon Tyne. Launched on 26 September 1942 and completed in October 1942. Torpedoed on 9 March 1943 by U-596 off Algiers and damaged. Arrived at Algiers the next day, cargo discharged and ship moved to a repair berth. Torpedoed on 26 March by German aircraft and back broken. Declared a constructive total loss. Towed out to sea and scuttled.

=== Empire Stanley ===
Empire Stanley was a 6,942 GRT CAM ship which was built by Greenock Dockyard Co Ltd, Greenock. Launched on 15 July 1941 and completed in September 1941. Torpedoed on 17 August 1943 and sunk by U-197 south of Madagascar (27°08′S 48°15′E).

=== Empire Star ===
Empire Star (not an "Empire ship"), official number 143407, was a 7,199 GRT, 423.4' × 56.0' × 28.7', refrigerated cargo liner built by Lithgows Ltd., Port Glasgow as Empirestar of the Empirestar S.S. Co. Ltd., renamed Empire Star in 1929 and Tudor Star in 1935 as new ship was taking the name. Sold 1950 to N.V. Scheepsloperijen Machinehandel to be broken up at Hendrik-Ido-Ambacht, the Netherlands.

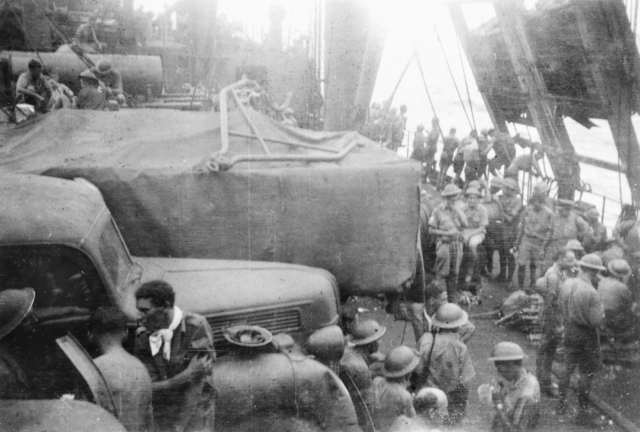
Evacuated troops from Singapore at sea aboard the second Empire Star, 12 February 1942

Empire Star (not an "Empire ship"), official number 163219, was an 11,093 GRT, 524.2' × 70.4' × 32.3', refrigerated cargo ship built by Harland & Wolff Ltd, Belfast owned by Frederick Leyland & Co. Ltd. The ship was among those in the first Trans-Tasman convoy in reaction to activities of German raiders in the Indian and South Pacific oceans. She was among the 13 ships evacuating Singapore on the night of 11–12 February 1942 with some 900 service people. During the day of the 12th the convoy was under air attack with Empire Star being hit with numerous casualties and fourteen military and two civilian refugees killed. On 16 February Empire Star departed Tanjung Priok with refugees bound for Fremantle. The ship underwent repairs for damage at Fremantle and Sydney. She was on a voyage from Liverpool to East London, South Africa when torpedoed by U-615 north of the Azores with 32 lost.

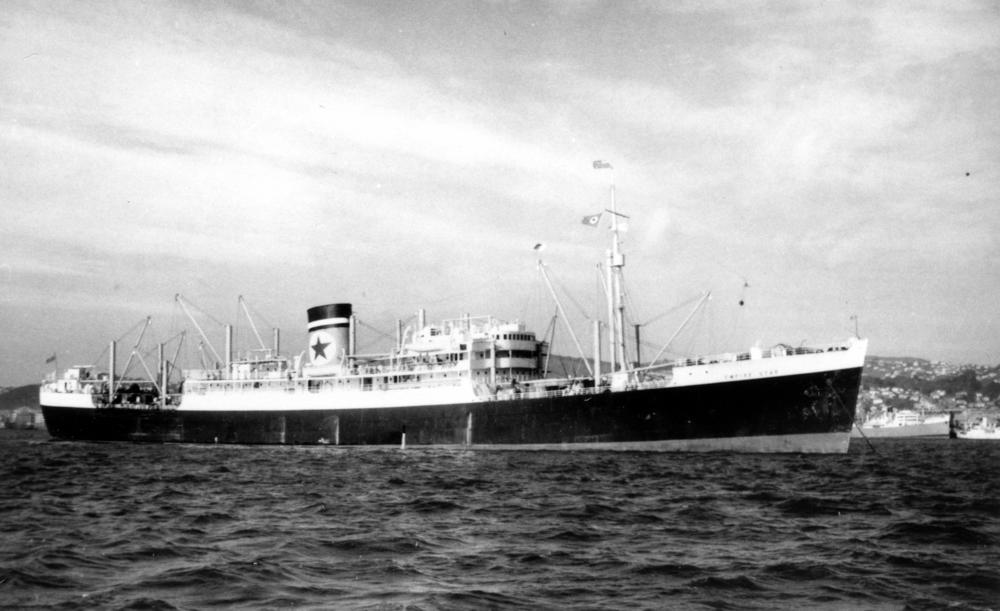
The third Empire Star

Empire Star , official number 181546, was an 11,000 GRT, 521.4' × 70.5' × 30.9', refrigerated cargo ship that was built by Harland & Wolff Ltd, Belfast. Launched on 4 March 1946 as Empire Mercia for MoWT. Completed in December 1946 as Empire Star for Blue Star Line. Sold in 1950 to Lamport & Holt Line Ltd., then in 1971 to Long Jong Industrial Co. Ltd., Taiwan for scrapping on 20 October 1971 at Kaohsiung, Taiwan.

=== Empire Starlight ===
Empire Starlight was a 6,854 GRT cargo ship which was built by Hong Kong and Whampoa Dock Co Ltd, Hong Kong. Launched on 4 April 1941 and completed in July 1941. Joined Convoy PQ 13, repeatedly bombed and sank on 1 June 1942 at Murmansk. Salvaged by USSR in 1945, repaired and renamed Murmansk, now 7,153 GRT. Sailed from Nagoya, Japan on 12 October 1979 bound for Nakhodka, USSR, reported to have been converted to a storage barge.

=== Empire Starling ===
Empire Starling was a 6,060 GRT cargo ship which was built by Moore Shipbuilding Co, Oakland, California. Completed in October 1919 as Nockum for USSB. To MoWT in 1938 and renamed Empire Starling. Torpedoed on 27 November 1939 by U-48 and sunk south of United Kingdom.

=== Empire State ===
Launched as Shaume by American International Shipbuilding, Hog Island, Pennsylvania. Renamed 1931. Not an Empire ship.

=== Empire Statesman ===
Empire Statesman was a 5,306 GRT cargo ship which was built by Societ per Azioni Ansaldo, Sestri Ponente, Italy. Completed in 1920 as Ansaldo VIII for Società Naz. Di Navigazione, Italy. Renamed Ansaldo Ottavo in 1925. Sold in 1928 to Società Comm. De Navigazione, Genoa and renamed Pellice. Sailed from the Tyne on 9 June 1940 and captured by the Royal Navy at sea the next day. Escorted to Methil, Fife. To MoWT and renamed Empire Statesman. Torpedoed on 11 December 1940 and sunk by U-94 in the North Atlantic.

=== Empire Steel ===
Empire Steel was an 8,138 GRT cargo ship which was built by Cammell Laird & Co Ltd, Birkenhead. Launched on 4 December 1940 and completed in March 1941. Torpedoed on 24 March 1942 by U-123 and finished off by gunfire north-east of Bermuda (37°45′N 74°50′W).

=== Empire Steelhead ===
Empire Steelhead was a 7,586 GRT cargo ship which was built by Pusey & Jones Co, Gloucester, New Jersey. Ordered by Pennsylvania Shipping Co, completed in 1920 as Patrick Henry for USSB. To Lykes Brothers-Ripley Steamship Co Inc, New York in 1933. To MoWT in 1940 and renamed Empire Steelhead. Allocated in 1942 to the Greek government and renamed Crete. Sold in 1947 to D Vernicos, Greece and renamed Vernicos Nicolaos. Sold in 1951 to Compagnia Marittima de Petroleo, Panama and renamed El Greco. Scrapped in September 1952 at Savona, Italy.

=== Empire Stella ===
Empire Stella was a 292 GRT tug which was built by Cochrane & Sons Ltd, Selby. Launched on 16 March 1945 and completed in August 1945. Boiler explosion on 1 January 1946, laid up and later sold to United Towing Co Ltd. Replacement steam engine fitted that had been intended to be installed in Empire Keith. A new diesel engine was fitted in 1961. Sold in 1969 to Rim. Sardi, Italy and renamed Poetto.

=== Empire Stevedore ===
Empire Stevedore was an approximately 750 GRT cargo ship which was built as Kriegtransporter KT 3. Taken over at Hamburg in October 1949 by the Royal Engineers. To Marchwood, Hampshire in 1950 for use as a stevedore training ship, replacing Empire Flamian.

The Empire Stevedore was reputed to be haunted, supposedly by the spirit of her last German captain, who—it was said—shot himself when the ship was captured towards the end of WWII. The ghostly figure could be seen shortly after midnight, standing in the wheelhouse, looking through binoculars towards the prow of the ship. Those brave enough to go aboard the ship after midnight could hear the captains footsteps as he climbed the step ladder to the bridge inside the accommodation.

=== Empire Stevenson ===
Empire Stevenson was a 6,209 GRT cargo ship which was built by John Readhead & Sons Ltd, South Shields. Launched on 25 August 1941 and completed in October 1941. Torpedoed on 13 September 1942 and sunk by German aircraft north of Bear Island (76°10′N 10°05′E) while a member of Convoy PQ 18.

=== Empire Stickleback ===
Empire Stickleback was a 1,984 GRT tanker which was built by American Shipbuilding Co, Cleveland, Ohio. Completed in 1895 as Malta. Converted to a barge in 1911 and rebuilt as a steamship in 1921. To Canada Steamship Lines and renamed Thunder Bay. Sold in 1940 to Branch Lines Ltd, Montreal. Converted to a tanker and renamed Pinebranch. To MoWT in 1945 and renamed Empire Stickleback. Returned to Branch Lines in 1946 and renamed Pinebranch. Cut down to deck level in 1961 and sunk on 24 May as a wharf at Malignant Cove, Nova Scotia.

=== Empire Storm ===
Empire Storm was a 7,290 GRT cargo ship which was built by John Readhead & Sons Ltd, South Shields. Launched on 27 January 1941 and completed in March 1941. Torpedoed on 29 May 1941 and sunk by U-557 at 55°00′N 39°50′W while a member of Convoy HX 128S.

=== Empire Story ===
Empire Story was a 7,037 GRT cargo ship which was built by Short Brothers Ltd, Sunderland. Launched on 19 December 1941 and completed in March 1942. Ran aground on 4 May 1942 at Briar Island, Nova Scotia and abandoned. Refloated herself at high tide and drifted off in fog. Taken in tow by Foundation Franklin with the intention to take her to Digby but she capsized and sank at 44°35′N 66°19′W.

=== Empire Stour ===
Empire Stour was a 4,696 GRT cargo ship which was built by Bartram & Sons Ltd, Sunderland. Completed in 1930 as Harpenden for National Steamship Co. Operated under the management of J & C Harrison. Torpedoed on 11 September 1940 by U-28 and severely damaged at the stern. Towed to the Clyde and declared a constructive total loss. Rebuilt in 1941, to MoWT and renamed Empire Stour. Sold in 1946 to Bharat Line, Bombay and renamed Bharatjal. Sold in 1957 to C A Petroutsis, Geneva and renamed Al-Riyadh. Transferred in 1958 to C A Petroutsis, Trieste and renamed Spetsai Patriot. Placed under arrest in 1962 at Lagos. Sold by Court Order, scrapped in September 1963 at Split, Yugoslavia.

=== Empire Strait ===
Empire Strait was a 2,841 GRT collier which was built by William Gray & Co Ltd, West Hartlepool. Launched on 31 October 1940 and completed in December 1940. Bombed on 28 April 1941 and damaged off Great Yarmouth. Sold in 1945 to Granta Steamship Co Ltd and renamed Granta. Operated under the management of Witherington & Everett, Newcastle upon Tyne. Scrapped in December 1960 at Harlingen, Netherlands.

=== Empire Stream ===
Empire Stream was a 2,922 GRT ore carrier which was built by Lithgows Ltd, Port Glasgow. Launched on 2 December 1940 and completed in March 1941. Torpedoed on 25 September 1941 and sunk by U-124 at 46°03′N 24°40′W while a member of Convoy HG 73.

=== Empire Strength ===
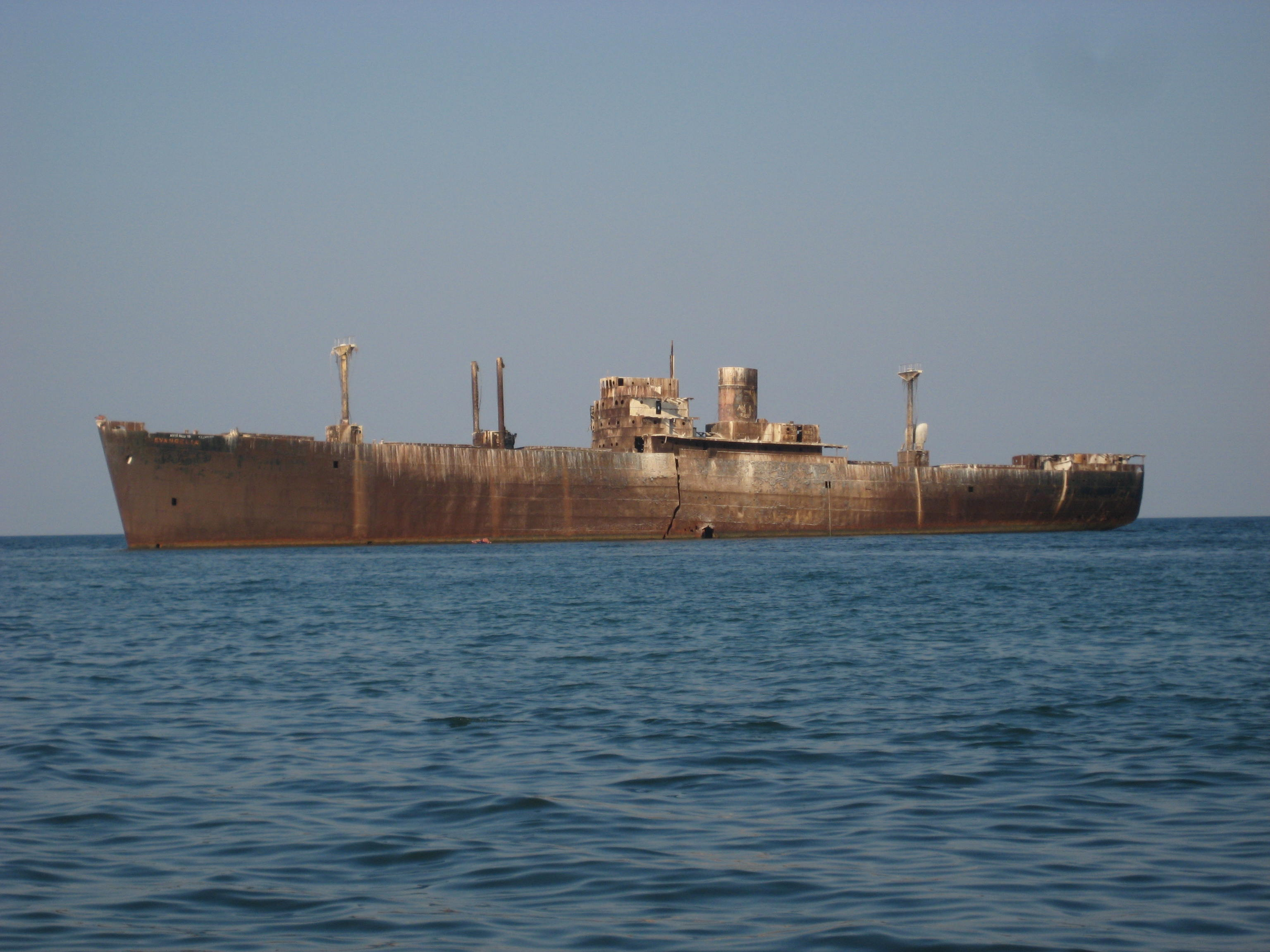
Wreck of E Evangelia, former Empire Strength

Empire Strength was a 7,355 GRT refrigerated cargo ship that was built by Harland & Wolff Ltd, Belfast in 1942, being launched on 28 May and completed in December. Sold in 1946 to Blue Star Line Ltd and renamed Saxon Star. Sold in 1961 to D L Street Ltd, Cardiff and renamed Redbrook. Sold in 1965 to Hegif Compagnia Navigazione SA and renamed E Evangelia. Operated under the management of H Embiricos, Greece. Ran aground on 15 October 1968 off Constanța, Romania (43°58′N 28°39′E) and declared a constructive total loss. The wreck is now a tourist attraction in Costinești.

=== Empire Stroma ===
Empire Stroma was a 5,123 GRT cargo ship which was built by Shipbuilding Corporation Ltd, Newcastle upon Tyne. Launched on 23 March 1947 and completed in July 1947 as Ashantian for United Africa Co Ltd. Sold in 1949 to Palm Line Ltd and renamed Ashanti Palm. Operated under the management of United Africa Co Ltd. Ran aground on 18 November 1962 on rocks at the entrance to Naples Harbour, Italy and sank.

=== Empire Stronghold ===
Empire Stronghold was a 7,050 GRT cargo ship which was built by Sir W G Armstrong-Whitworth (Shipbuilders) Ltd, Newcastle upon Tyne. Launched on 14 September 1943 and completed in December 1943. Allocated in 1945 to the French government and renamed Camille Porche. Sold in 1948 to Société Navale Delmas-Vieljeux, France and renamed Colonel Vieljeux. Sold in 1960 to Vita Shipping Co, Liberia and renamed Atticos. Sold in 1961 to Supreme Shipping Co Inc, Panama and renamed Valor. Ran aground on 28 March 1963 at Mukho, South Korea, declared a constructive total loss.

=== Empire Stronsay ===
Empire Stronsay was a 7,318 GRT cargo ship which was built by Shipbuilding Corporation Ltd, Newcastle upon Tyne. Laid down as Empire Stronsay and launched on 26 September 1946 as Louis E Durand. Completed in December 1946 as Chef Mecanician Durand for the French government. Sold in 1949 to Compagnie Maritime Normande and renamed Rollon. Operated under the management of J Chastellain et Compagnie, Rouen. Sold in 1963 to Aegis Shipping Co Ltd Greece and renamed Aeakos. Ran aground on 9 September 1965 off Borneo (05°07′N 112°33′E) and abandoned. A salvage vessel was despatched from Singapore on 11 November but the ship was seized by pirates on 5 December 1965 and the salvage vessel returned to base.

=== Empire Stuart ===
Empire Stuart was a 7,067 GRT cargo ship which was built by Short Brothers Ltd, Sunderland. Launched on 29 October 1943 and completed in February 1944. Sold in 1946 to Norwood Steamship Co Ltd and renamed Lord Lloyd George. Operated under the management of Ships Finance & Management Co Ltd, London. Sold in 1955 to Rotterdamsche Kolen Centrale NV, Rotterdam and renamed Atje-Ray-S. Sold in 1957 to Insulare Compagnia Sicula di Armamento, Sicily and renamed Gianfranco. Operated under the management of CITMAR, Genoa. Scrapped in December 1964 at Vado Ligure, Italy.

=== Empire Success ===
Empire Success was a 5,988 GRT cargo ship which was built by Vulkan Werke, Hamburg. Completed in 1921 as Hagen for Hamburg America Line. Seized on 8 September 1939 at Durban by the South African Navy. To the South African government and renamed Ixia. Bombed on 30 September 1940 at Peterhead, Aberdeenshire and damaged. To MoWT, repaired and renamed Empire Success. Laid up in January 1948 at Liverpool after a collision. Uneconomic to repair and scuttled on 22 August 1948 in the Bay of Biscay with a cargo of obsolete chemical ammunition.

=== Empire Summer ===
Empire Summer was a 6,949 GRT cargo ship which was built by Short Brothers Ltd, Sunderland. Launched on 27 December 1940 and completed in May 1941. Sold in 1946 to Turnbull, Scott & Co Ltd, London and renamed Stonegate. Sold in 1955 to C Meentzen Schiffahrt und Handel GmbH, Bremen and renamed Hastedt. Sold in 1959 to the Chinese government and renamed Hoping Wu Shi Err. Renamed Ho Ping 52 in 1979 and Zhan Dou 52 c1985. Removed from shipping registers in 1987.

=== Empire Sun ===
Empire Sun was a 6,952 GRT cargo ship which was built by Short Brothers Ltd, Sunderland. Launched on 10 April 1941 and completed in June 1941. Torpedoed on 7 February 1942 and sunk by U-751 south of Halifax, Nova Scotia (43°55′N 64°22′W).

=== Empire Sunbeam ===
Empire Sunbeam was a 6,711 GRT cargo ship which was built by William Gray & Co Ltd, West Hartlepool. Launched on 16 January 1941 and completed in March 1941. Sold in 1945 to Ropner Shipping Co Ltd and renamed Swainby. Sold in 1962 to Trafalgar Steamship Co Ltd and renamed Newgate. Operated under the management of Tsavliris (Shipping) Ltd, London. Sold in 1967 to Kantara Shipping Co Ltd, Cyprus. Sold in 1968 to Newgate Shipping Co Ltd, Cyprus. Arrived on 2 October 1971 at Istanbul for scrapping.

=== Empire Sunrise ===
Empire Sunrise was a 7,459 GRT cargo ship which was built by J L Thompson & Sons Ltd, Sunderland. Launched on 13 November 1940 and completed in February 1941. Torpedoed on 2 November 1942 and damaged by U-402 while a member of Convoy SC 107. Later torpedoed and sunk by U-84.

=== Empire Surf ===
Empire Surf was a 6,640 GRT cargo ship which was built by Bartram & Sons Ltd, Sunderland. Launched on 13 January 1941 and completed in April 1941. Torpedoed on 14 January 1942 and sunk by U-43 south-east of the Faroe Islands (58°42′N 19°16′W) while a member of Convoy ON 55. Of the crew of 53, 47 died. It was part of convoy ON 55 en route from Manchester to Jacksonville, Florida, without cargo and Albert Sandham was the Master of the ship, at the time of the sinking.

=== Empire Susan ===
Empire Susan was a 593 GRT tug which was built by Clelands (Successors) Ltd, Willington Quay-on-Tyne. Launched on 19 July 1944 and completed in October 1944. Sold in 1946 to William Watkins Ltd and renamed Rumania. Ran aground on 10 February 1956 on Long Sands Bank, Thames Estuary while assisting Loide-Honduras which was also aground. Crew rescued by helicopter before she sank, declared a total loss.

=== Empire Swale ===
Empire Swale was a 5,452 GRT cargo ship which was built by Deutsche Schiff- und Maschinenbau AG, Wesermünde. Completed in 1937 as Takoradian for United Africa Company, Liverpool. Seized in 1941 by French authorities at Dakar, Senegal and renamed St Paul. Returned to Britain in 1943 and renamed Takoradian. To MoWT later that year and renamed Empire Swale. Returned to the United Africa Company in 1946 and renamed Takoradian. In 1948 caught fire and sank at Copenhagen, was re-floated after temporary repairs then sailed to Bremen for a complete overhaul. Parent company Unilever underwent restructuring in which UAC shipping assets became Palm Line Ltd in 1949, and the ship was renamed Takoradi Palm. Sold in 1959 to E N Vernicos Shipping Co, Greece and renamed Irini's Luck. Scrapped in May 1963 at Vigo, Spain.

=== Empire Swallow ===
Empire Swallow was a 209 GRT coaster which was built by J Koster, Groningen, Netherlands. Completed in 1928 as Meuse. Sold in 1935 to William H Muller & Co, London and renamed Swallow. Damaged on 12 June 1940 during the occupation of Paris and abandoned. Salvaged by Germany, renamed Schwalbe. Seized in May 1945 at the Channel Islands. To MoWT and renamed Empire Swallow. Returned to Muller's in 1946 and renamed Swallow. Sold in 1958 to H & T Schoning, Düsseldorf and renamed Lies. Rebuilt in 1962, now 249 GRT. Sold in 1969 to M Harmstorf, Hamburg and renamed Mariana. Removed from shipping registers in 1987.

=== Empire Swan ===
Missourian

Empire Swan was a 7,965 GRT cargo ship which was built by the Merchant Shipbuilding Corporation, Chester, Pennsylvania. Completed in June 1922 as Missourian for American Hawaiian Steamship Co. To MoWT in 1940 and renamed Empire Swan. Allocated in 1942 to the Belgian government and renamed Belgian Freighter. Sold in 1946 to Compagnie Maritime Belge and renamed Capitaine Potié. Sold in 1948 to Compagnia Genovese di Navigazione a Vapore SA, Genoa and renamed Genova. Sold in 1955 to Compagnia Genovese di Armamento and renamed Flaminia. Now 8,791 GRT. Sold in 1963 to Compra Vendita Covena, Genoa. Sold in 1965 to Bakhashab Mohammed Abubakur, Saudi Arabia and renamed King Abdelaziz. Arrived on 23 April 1970 at Kaohsiung, Taiwan for scrapping.

=== Empire Swordsman ===
Empire Swordsman was a 7,067 GRT cargo ship which was built by William Hamilton & Co Ltd, Port Glasgow. Launched on 11 May 1944 and completed in July 1944. Sold in 1948 to Goulandris Brothers Ltd, London and renamed Granrock. Sold in 1950 to Ben Line Steamers Ltd and renamed Benloyal. Sold in 1951 to Glasgow United Shipping Co Ltd and renamed Loch Ranza. Operated under the management of Maclay & McIntyre Ltd. Sold in 1960 to Trico Corp SA, Lebanon and renamed Tertric. Arrived on 26 April 1968 at Kaohsiung, Taiwan for scrapping.

=== Empire Sybil ===
Empire Sybil was a 275 GRT tug which was built by Cochrane & Sons Ltd, Selby. Launched on 7 May 1943 and completed in August 1943. Sold in 1947 to Mersey Docks and Harbour Board and renamed Assistant. Sold in 1962 to Alexandra Towing co Ltd and renamed Caswell. On 18 November 1962 she was towing RFA Green Ranger from Cardiff to Plymouth for a refit when the towline broke. Green Ranger was driven ashore at Sennen Cove and broke in two. Caswell arrived on 25 March 1969 at Passage West, County Cork for scrapping.

=== Empire Symbol ===
Empire Symbol was a 7,030 GRT cargo ship which was built by C Connell & Co Ltd, Glasgow. Launched on 30 July 1943 and completed in October 1943. Allocated in 1943 to the French government and renamed Professeur Emile Lagarde. Sold in 1957 to Compagnia Navigazione Primula SA and renamed North Baroness. Operated under the management of A G Pappadakis, Greece. Sold in 1959 to Faik Zeren, Turkey and renamed Anadolu. Scrapped in July 1967 in Istanbul.

== See also ==
The above entries give a précis of each ship's history. For a fuller account see the linked articles.

== Bibliography ==
- Mitchell, W. H.; Sawyer, L. A. (1990). The Empire Ships (2nd ed.). London, New York, Hamburg, Hong Kong: Lloyd's of London Press Ltd. ISBN 1-85044-275-4.
