= Thorshavet =

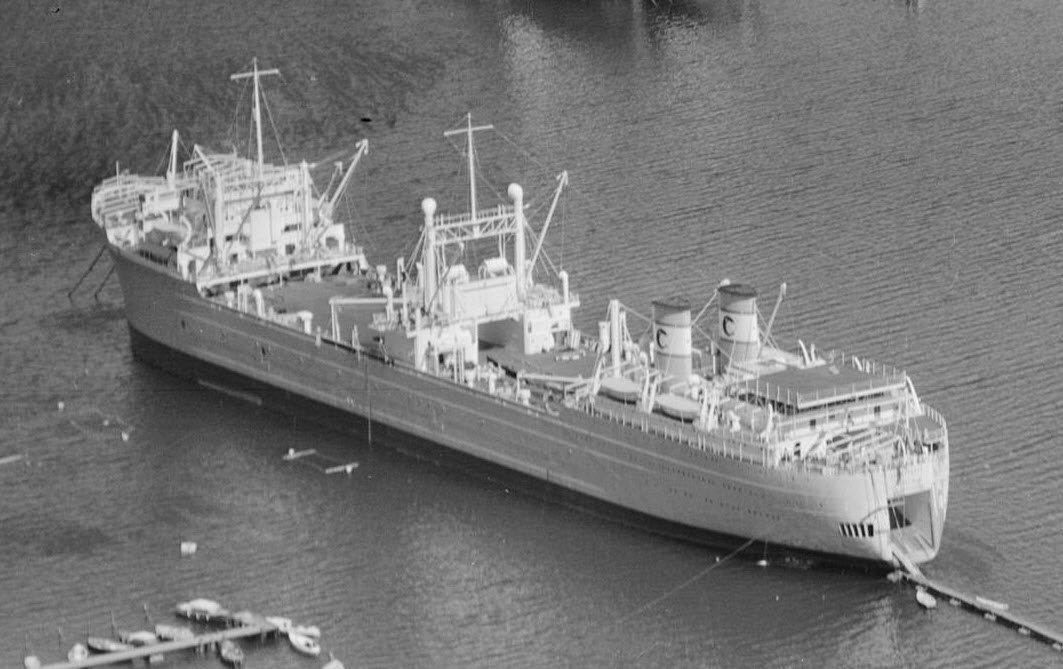
Thorshavet in 1956.

Thorshavet was a Norwegian whaling factory ship built in 1947 off the coast of Mauritania. It was later named Astra.

It collided with the cargo ship Karonga (Singapore) off the coast of Portuguese Guinea. It sank on 17 April 1974 with the loss of a crew member.
