= Anyinasuso =

Community in Ashanti Region, Ghana

- Town
- Country: Ghana
- Region: Ashanti Region
- District: Ahafo Ano North Municipality

Population
  - Total: —
- Time zone: GMT
  - Summer (DST): GMT

Anyinasuso is a community near Tepa in the Ahafo Ano North Municipality in the Ashanti Region of Ghana.
