= United Africa Company =

British company which principally traded in West Africa during the 20th century

- Company type: Subsidiary of Unilever
- Industry: Import & Export Trading, Shipping, Palm Oil plantations
- Predecessor: Royal Niger Company
- Founded: 1929
- Defunct: 1987
- Successor: Unilever
- Headquarters: London, United Kingdom
- Area served: West & Central Africa
- Key people: Sir Arthur Edward Dyson, Sir Robert Whaley Cohen, Lord Trenchard, Frank Samuel & Sir Arthur Smith
- Parent: Unilever

The United Africa Company (UAC) was a British company which principally traded in West Africa during the 20th century.

The United Africa Company was formed in 1929 as a result of the merger of The Niger Company, which had been effectively owned by Lever Brothers since 1920, and the African & Eastern Trade Corporation. In the early 1930s the United Africa Company was nearly reduced to bankruptcy and as a result it came under the control of Unilever which had just been formed. Unilever had only been created from the merger of Lever Brothers and the Dutch Margarine Union earlier on 3 March 1929. The United Africa Company continued as subsidiary of Unilever until 1987 when it was absorbed by the parent company.

== Chairmen ==
- 1929–1931 Robert Whaley Cohen
- 1936–1953 Hugh Trenchard
- Frank Samuel
- 1969 Arthur Smith

== Merchant fleet ==
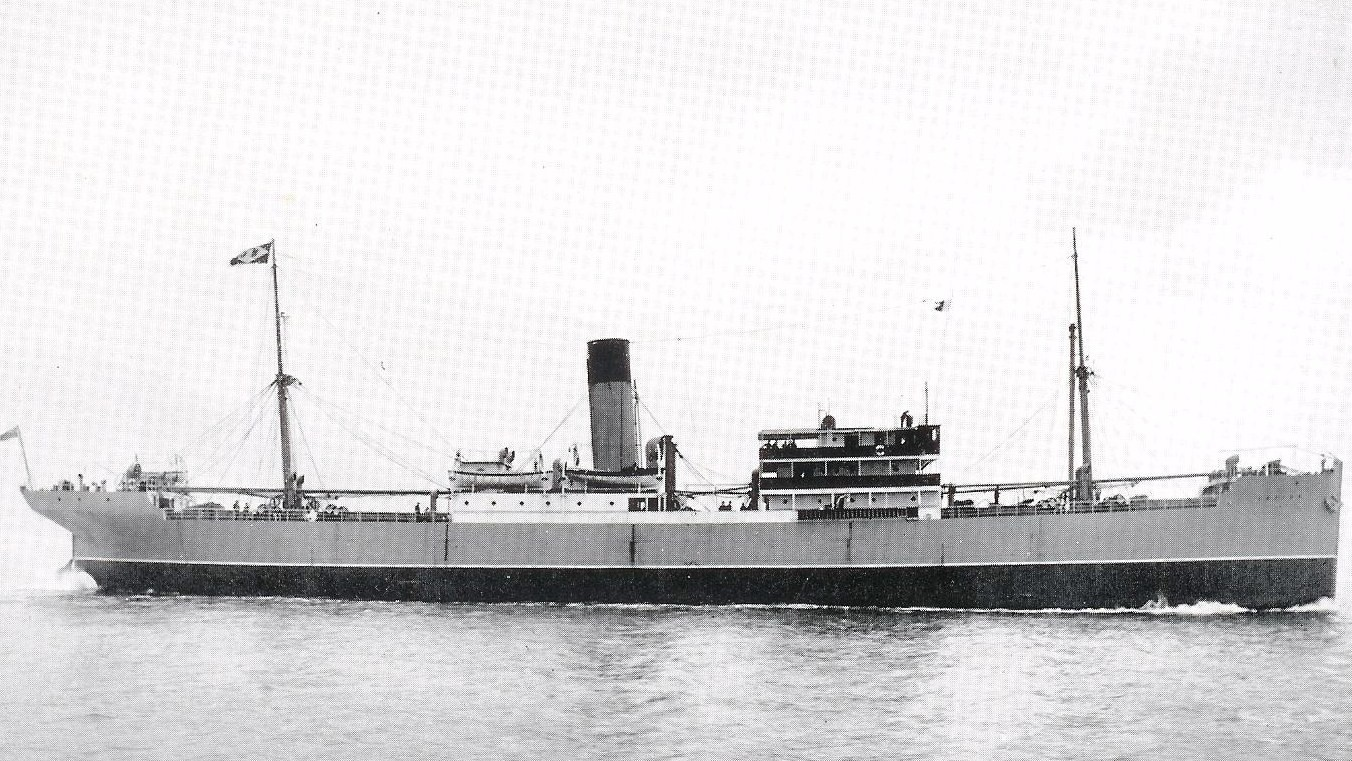
3,832 GRT Lafian: built in 1928, scrapped 1968

=== Background ===
William Hesketh Lever was a well known soap manufacturer and became involved in the West Africa trade to supply his company, primarily with palm oil.

In 1916 Lever took over the Manchester firm of H. Watson & Co., which had a fleet of eight vessels, with names derived from villages in Cheshire and Shropshire: Colemere, Delamere, Eskmere, Flaxmere, Linmere, Oakmere, Rabymere and Redesmere. This small fleet, whose tonnages ranged from 1,251 to 2,293, was formed into the Bromport Steamship Company Ltd. – named after Bromborough, a town on the Wirral Peninsula that, like Port Sunlight, was dominated by Lever-owned businesses. It sailed under a new blue house flag, marked with a white star, the letters BSCL and a central L for Lever.

In the two remaining years of the First World War the Bromport Line lost half of its ships (Colemere, Eskmere, Redesmere and Delamere) to German U-boats.

In 1918 the twin-screwed vessel SS Kulambanga, owned by Lever's Pacific Plantations, was added to the fleet. In February 1920 Lever acquired the Royal Niger Company, just in time for the West African trade bubble to burst (the price of palm kernel oil fell from £115 per ton in Feb 1920 to £55 per ton in July 1920). In 1923 Lever Brothers decided to cut their losses and withdraw from deep sea shipping.

In 1923, African & Eastern had formed a fleet of its own. It included a 2,116 GRT Scandinavian steamer that was renamed Ashantian, the 2,513 GRT steamship Woodville that was bought from the Southern Whaling and Sealing Company, and a 2,739 GRT steamer that was renamed Ethiopian. Oakmere was sold to MacAndrews & Co Ltd, Manchester and renamed Bazan. She was subsequently sold on in 1936 to Westcliffe Shipping Co Ltd, London and renamed Thorpehall. She was bombed and sunk off Valencia on 25 May 1938 in the Spanish Civil War.

In 1925 African & Eastern commissioned its first ship, the 3,543 GRT Nigerian, and when the Woodville was sold in 1928 she was replaced by another new ship, the 3,832 GRT Lafian. In the same year the Niger Company, encouraged by the improvement in its fortunes and influenced by the example of its rival, took the steps to create its own fleet with the purchase of the Cunard steamer Tyria, which was renamed Ars – from the old Royal Niger Company Latin motto, Ars Jus Pax (art, justice, peace). Ars was scrapped in 1930

=== Post-merger ===
When the merger took place the new company had a fleet of five ships. The idea of trading companies in West Africa to operate their own fleets was not new since many of the companies that now formed part of UAC, including Hatton & Cookson, had had their own fleets, sixty or more years before. Millers Ltd and F&A Swanzy Brothers, both African & Eastern subsidiaries, were still operating sailing ships as late as 1924; and John Holt's, the Liverpool-based company that was one of UAC's rivals in West Africa also operated its own fleet.

The chief requirement of the West African trade was a fleet made up of several small ships rather than a few large ones. Deliveries had to be frequent, and there were many ports to be served. The size of the new company meant that the prospects for the new UAC fleet were much better than had been the case with the old Bromport Line. Soon UAC began to rapidly expand its fleet.

Between 1930 and 1934 seven more second-hand ships were bought, the largest of which was the 5,449 GRT Lagosian. Following the traditions of A&E ships were named after countries or ports with which they served – Mendian, Zarian, Kumasian, Lagosian, Congonian, Gambian and Dahomian. There was a second wave of fleet expansion in 1930's partly due to improved trading conditions but also because Unilever had large sums of money in Germany which had been blocked by the German government. It was impossible to get this money out of the country in the normal way, but it could be used to build ships in Germany. This new building programme was agreed upon in 1934, and the first ship to be completed joined the fleet in 1935. She was the 4,917 GRT Ashantian – the second ship to bear this name; the first having been sold in 1932. This was closely followed by her sister ship, the Kumasian.

As the building programme gathered pace, most of the old second-hand vessels were sold; Zarian and Mendian were sold for scrap, and the original Kumasian and Congonian to Italian buyers in 1935 and 1936 respectively. The Gambian was sold in 1936. The launching of Lafian and Zarian in 1938 marked the end of this major building programme.

With the outbreak of war in September 1939 the British government immediately requisitioned all 16 UAC ships.

=== September 1939 ===
| Ship | Built | Type | GRT | Notes |
|---|---|---|---|---|
| SS Lagosian | 1928 | General Cargo | 5,449 | |
| SS Dahomian | 1929 | General Cargo | 5,277 | Built by Northumberland Shipbuilding Company (1927) Ltd, Howden-on-Tyne. Completed in June 1929 as Greek Themoni for Kassos Steam Navigation Co Ltd (Pnevmaticos, Rethymnis, Yannaghas), Syra. In 1933 she was sold to Britain and renamed Dahomian for United Africa Co Ltd, London. |
| SS Warrian | 1929 | General Cargo | 1,057 | African coastal services, ex- Frank. In 1937 purchased from C. J. Reim, Porsgrunn, (Norway) renamed Warrian. She was sunk in a collision in the Gulf of Guinea on 12 December 1941. |
| SS Ashantian | 1935 | General Cargo | 4,917 | |
| SS Kumasian | 1935 | General Cargo | 4,917 | |
| SS Guinean | 1936 | General Cargo | 4,900 | German-built |
| SS Liberian | 1936 | General Cargo | 5,129 | German-built |
| SS Nigerian | 1936 | General Cargo | 5,423 | German-built |
| SS Leonian | 1936 | General Cargo | 5,419 | German-built |
| SS Ethiopian | 1936 | General Cargo | 5,424 | German-built |
| SS Matadian | 1936 | BVOC | 4,275 | |
| MV Congonian | 1937 | BVOC | 5,065 | German-built |
| MV Gambian | 1937 | General Cargo | 5,457 | German-built |
| MV Takoradian | 1937 | General Cargo | 5,599 | German-built |
| SS Conakrian | 1937 | General Cargo | 4,876 | |
| SS Lafian | 1937 | General Cargo | 4,876 | |
| SS Zarian | 1937 | General Cargo | 4,876 | |

=== Wartime service ===
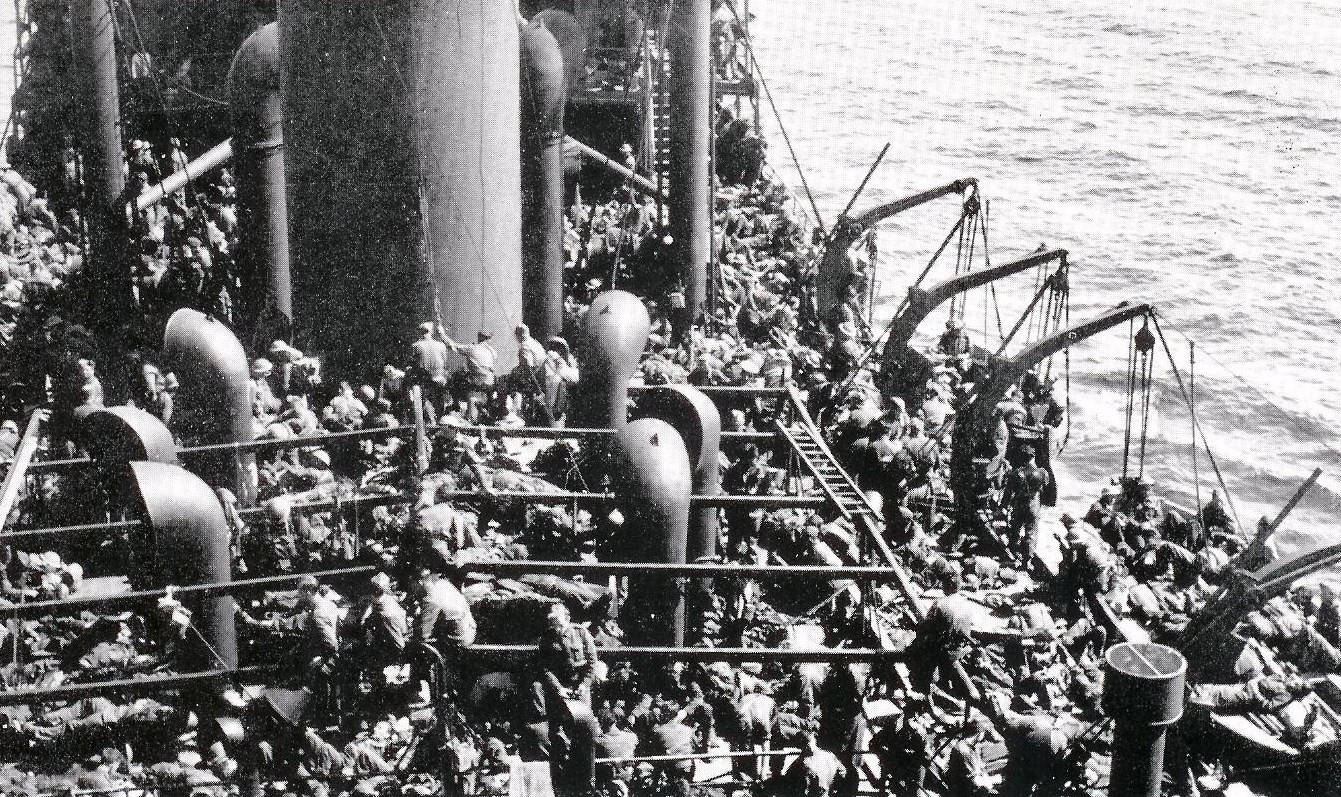
Aboard Guinean in June 1940: some of the 3,600 men personnel repatriated from France in Operation Aerial

Guinean was the first of the fleet to see action. On 17 June 1940 she was at Saint-Nazaire taking part in the evacuation of remnants of the British Expeditionary Force (BEF) in Operation Aerial.

On 30 June 1940 the Zarian was torpedoed by U-26 250 nautical miles (460 km) off the Scilly Isles. She was struck amidships on the port side aft. Fortunately there were no casualties and she was towed to Falmouth by the tug HMS Salvonia for repair and she returned to service in June 1941. She had been en route in ballast from Portsmouth to Dakar.

Lagosian was not so lucky. In September 1940 she was bombed in the North Sea with the loss of five lives. Like the Conakrian, which was torpedoed in October 1940, she was able to reach port, but on 18 November 1940 the Congonian was the first ship to be lost. She was torpedoed off Freetown by U-65.

A different fate befell the Takoradian and Gambian however. They had entered Dakar for diesel bunkers, and on 5 July 1940, shortly after the fall of France, they were boarded by Vichy French officials and impounded. They were not released until 1943.

At sea the losses continued. On 5 August 1941 the Kumasian was sunk by torpedo off the Irish Coast by U-74. There was only one fatality, with all 59 survivors being picked up by Royal Navy corvette HMS La Malouine.

In the early hours of 24 September 1941, Convoy SL-87, bound from Freetown to Liverpool, was attacked 500 miles off the Azores. Three ships were lost, namely Lafian, John Holt and Elder Dempster's Dixcove. U-107 was responsible for all three.

Captain Evan Llewellyn Philips MBE, master of the Lafian, left this account of her last voyage.

On the fifth or sixth night after our departure from Freetown the fun started. The first ship to be torpedoed was one of the Silver Line, which was hit amidships and dropped astern...On the next night, about the same time, 2230 hours, the enemy struck again and two ships were hit and sunk. On the following night he (German Type IX submarine U-67) came again at about the same time but he only succeeded to strike one on this occasion, St Clair, managed by UAC and commanded by Captain Readman. She soon disappeared, in fact they did not have time to lower any boats and had to jump for it. They were later picked up by one of the escort vessels, but there were 13 missing when a roll call was taken. About 0430 hours the same night we were hit amidships as was the John Holt, the Commodore ship, and another ship belonging to Elders. There now remained four vessels out of the 13 which left Freetown, but I did hear that the remaining four reached their destination.

When I reached the bridge after we were hit my Chief Officer, Mr Croft, asked if he could lower the lifeboats. I could feel the ship was doomed as she was filling up and taking a list to starboard. I of course agreed and then went forward to the sailor's and firemen's quarters to make sure that none had slept through it. I found no one and returned amidships where all the officers and crew were assembled, all accounted for. We lowered the boats and while the men were filling them an apparition in white flew past me. This later turned out to be the 2nd Officer going for his trousers...

According to the best traditions and customs I was the last man to leave the ship... Shortly after the two boats got clear of the Lafian she turned over and slowly sank.

All of the crew members, including the master, 37 crew members, 5 DEMS gunners and 4 passengers were picked up by HMS Gorleston and landed at Ponta Deldaga in the Azores. There was no loss of life.

The unescorted Nigerian was sunk at 00:05 hours on 9 December 1942. She had survived an air raid in Liverpool during the blitz, but this time she was sunk by torpedo 130 miles off Trinidad by the German Type IX submarine U-508. Four crew members and one passenger died. There were 56 survivors. Four passengers (an RAF officer and three army officers) were taken prisoner in the submarine. The master and 29 survivors were picked up on 11 December 1942 by US Navy submarine-chaser USS PC-624 and landed at Moruga Bay, Trinidad. The chief officer and 14 survivors were picked up by Canadian merchant ship Newbrundoc and the 2nd officer and 6 survivors were picked up by Panamanian merchant ship Maravi.

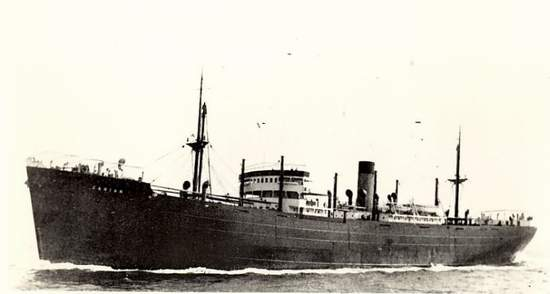
4,871 GRT Zarian

Twenty days later, at 21:23 on 28 December 1942, on her way from Leith to Takoradi and straggling from Convoy ON 154, Zarian was torpedoed and sunk by U-591, with the loss of four lives. Zarian had been initially struck by a torpedo from U-406, but it was U-591 that delivered the coup de grâce on the, now abandoned, Zarian just before midnight. Four crew members were lost, with the 49 remaining survivors picked up by the destroyer HMS Milne at 08:15, and landed at Ponta Delgada in the Azores.

On 28 March 1943 the Lagosian, which had been repaired after her earlier attack, was finally sunk by torpedo by U-167 on her way from Algiers to Takoradi via Gibraltar. She was hit by one torpedo and broke in two and sank southeast of the Canary Islands. 11 people were killed, and the 35 survivors were picked up by the British tug Empire Denis and landed at Bathurst, Gambia.

A month later came the fleet's worst tragedy of the war. On 21 April 1943, on the way to New York in Convoy ONS-3, the Ashantian was torpedoed by U-415 and sunk northeast of St.Johns with the loss of 16 crew members, including the master, Captain Charles Carter-Taylor and convoy commodore Captain Jeffery Elliott, DSO, RD, RN. They were both last seen trying to release a raft aft. She was struck by one torpedo on the starboard side, and suddenly sank only 7 minutes after the torpedo hit. The survivors were picked up by HMS Northern Gift within 3 hours.

Ashantian had survived an earlier attack by U-137 on 26 September 1940, when, as part of Convoy OB 218, she was hit amidships on the port side by a single torpedo. It disabled the ship, killing four crew members on watch in the engine room. Both port lifeboats had been destroyed, and the 38 surviving crew members immediately abandoned ship using only the starboard 2 lifeboats, but one of them swamped, so all had to board the single remaining lifeboat. At daylight they reboarded the vessel, recovered the swamped lifeboat and sent distress signals to a circling aircraft. The commander of the Flower-class corvette HMS Gloxinia ordered the crew to leave the vessel again because a U-boat was reported in nearby Dromore Bay. On 27 September 1940, the master and crew were returned to the vessel where she was towed to Rothesay by tugs HMS Superman and HMS Seaman. She was beached in Kames Bay on 30 September 1940. In May 1941 the ship was refloated and towed to Glasgow, where she was repaired and returned to service in September 1941.

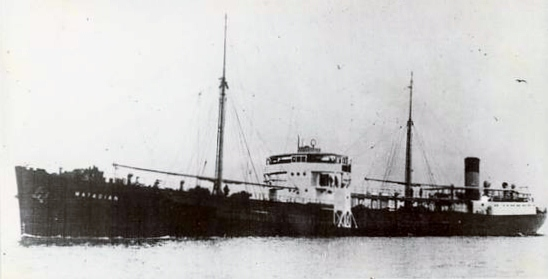
4,275 GRT Matadian

The crew of the unescorted Matadian were luckier when she was attacked and sunk by U-66 in the Gulf of Guinea, en route from Lagos to the UK, on 21 March 1944. The only injury came when the Chief Officer was blown off the bridge by the blast. They were close enough to shore to be picked up by two Royal Navy motor launches HMS ML-282 and HMS ML-1016.

The also unescorted Dahomian was lost 10 miles west-southwest off Cape Point, South Africa on 1 April 1944, torpedoed by U-852. Two crew died, and there were 49 survivors. They were picked up by two South African armed whalers HMSAS Krugersdorp and HMSAS Natalia, and landed in Simonstown. She was en route from New York to Cape Town, via Trinidad. She was the last UAC ship to go down. Of the 16 ships that started the war, nine had been sunk. Of the seven remaining, five were damaged. The only two ships unscathed were Leonian and Ethiopian which had served most of the war with the Royal Navy. In addition to the ships, 46 lives had been lost.

During the war, UAC had tried to make good their losses by building three replacement vessels, namely, the Congonian (1942), the Kumasian (1943) and Lafian (1943). By 1945, UAC had only 10 ships.

=== End of the fleet ===
In 1947 three new ships were bought under the government ship disposal scheme and named Ashantian, Lagosian and Zarian. the following year the company commissioned two more ships: Nigerian and the tanker Matadian.

These additions increased the fleet to 15. But the ships alone did not solve the problem of how UAC's shipping interest should best operate in the post-war era. It was becoming clear that the future of the shipping side of the business could best be served by establishing it as an independent company, a common carrier able to operate in the same way as other lines and not tied exclusively to UAC traffic. Hence, on 16 February 1949, an extraordinary general meeting of the shareholders was held to set up a new company. This was done by reviving the dormant articles of association of the old Southern Whaling and Sealing Company and changing its name to Palm Line.

== See also ==
- United Africa Company of Nigeria

== Bibliography ==
- Baker, Geoffrey L. (1996). Trade Winds on the Niger: Saga of the Royal Niger Company, 1830–1971. London: Radcliffe Press. ISBN 978-1860640148.
- Butler, Lawrence J. (1997). Industrialisation and the British Colonial State: West Africa 1939–1951. London: Frank Cass.
- Davies, Peter N. (1979). Henry Tyrer: A Liverpool Shipping Agent and His Enterprise, 1879–1979. Taylor & Francis. ISBN 9780856649660.
- Fage, John Donnelly; Roberts, A. D.; Oliver, Roland Anthony (1986). The Cambridge History of Africa. Cambridge University Press. p. 116. ISBN 978-0-521-22505-2.
- Gann, Lewis H.; Duignan, Peter, eds. (1975). Colonialism in Africa, 1870-1960: The Economics of Colonialism. Cambridge University Press. p. 107. ISBN 0-521-08641-8.
- Kohn, Roger (1970). Palm Line: The Coming of Age 1949–1970. London: Raithby, Lawrence and Company Ltd.
- Smith, Sir Arthur (1969). "A Business Man's View of Africa". African Affairs. 68 (273). Oxford University Press: 334. doi:10.1093/oxfordjournals.afraf.a095925.
