= Asene Manso Akroso District =

Asene-Manso-Akroso District
- District
- Districts of Eastern Region

- Location of Asene-Manso-Akroso District within Eastern
- Coordinates: 5°54′17.64″N 0°53′6.36″W
- Country: Ghana
- Region: Eastern
- Capital: Akim Manso

Area
  - Total: 1,090 km^{2} (420 sq mi)

Population (2021)
  - Total: 77,498
- Time zone: UTC+0 (GMT)

Asene Manso Akroso District is one of the thirty-three districts in Eastern Region, Ghana. Originally it was formerly part of the then-larger and first Birim South District in 1988, which it was created from the former Birim District Council, until the western part of the district was split off to create a new Birim South District, with Akim Swedru as its capital town; thus the remaining part has been renamed as Birim Central Municipal District on 29 February 2008, with Akim Oda as its capital town, which it was elevated to municipal district assembly status on that same year. However, on 15 March 2018, the southeast part of the district was split off to become Asene-Manso-Akroso District; thus the remaining part has been retained as Birim Central Municipal District. The district assembly is located in the southwest part of Eastern Region and has Akim Manso as its capital town.
