= Achiase District =

District in Eastern Region, Ghana

- District
- Districts of Eastern Region

- Location of Achiase District within Eastern
- Coordinates: 5°50′6″N 0°59′49.2″W
- Country: Ghana
- Region: Eastern
- Capital: Achiase

Population (2021)
  - Total: 56,348
- Time zone: UTC+0 (GMT)

Achiase District is one of the thirty-three districts in Eastern Region, Ghana. Originally it was formerly part of the then-larger and first Birim South District (with Akim Oda as its capital town) in 1988, which was created from the former Birim District Council, until the western part of the district was split off to create a new Birim South District on 29 February 2008; thus the remaining part has been renamed as Birim Central Municipal District, with Akim Oda as its capital town. However on 15 March 2018, the eastern part of the district was split off to create Achiase District; thus the remaining part has been retained as Birim South District. The district assembly is located in the southwest part of Eastern Region and has Achiase as its capital town.

== Background ==
Other towns in the district include Aperade, Akenkasu, Osorase, Akim Anyinam and Anamase among others. Achiase District is relatively a new district requiring infrastructural development across all sectors. Akim Achiase is the main commercial Centre with two major market days in a week on Tuesdays and Fridays. On such days, the district capital gets busy with heavy trading primarily from traders across towns and villages in the district and also from nearby districts like Birim South, Birim Central and Asikuma-Odoben-Brakwa. The district currently has two senior high schools namely Achiase Senior High and Aperade Senior High School. The district also has railway coverage from Achiase through to Aperade but currently require investment as the lines have been idle for over a decade. The Ghana Armed Forces also has a Jungle Warfare Training School in Achiase called Seth Anthony Barracks as it was named after Major Seth Anthony, the first black African Soldier to become an officer in the British Army.

== External links and sources ==
- Achiase (District, Ghana) - Population Statistics, Charts, Map
- BusinessGhanaAchiaseDistrict Assembly highlightsachievements2020
- Newly Created Achiase District Inaugurated Feb 22, 2019] AllAfrica.comGhana
