= Kwabena Adusa Okerchiri =

Ghanaian politician

Hon. Kwabena Adusa Okerchiri

Member of Parliament for Nkawkaw Constituency
- In office 7 January 1996 – 6 January 2008
- President: John Agyekum Kufuor
- Preceded by: J.K Abankwa
- Succeeded by: Seth Adjei Baah

Personal details
- Party: New Patriotic Party
- Education: University of Ghana, Accra
- Profession: Lawyer

Kwabena Adusa Okerchiri is a Ghanaian politician and a member of parliament representing the New Patriotic Party for the Nkawkaw constituency in the Eastern region of Ghana. He served his term in three consecutive parliaments from the Second till the Fourth parliament of the fourth republic of Ghana from 1996 to 2004. He was then taken over by Seth Adjei Baah.

== Early life and education ==
Kwabena Adusa attended the University of Ghana. He was born in the year 1960 and comes from the Eastern region.

== Career ==
Kwabena Adusa Okerchiri is a lawyer by profession.

== Politics ==
Adusa was first elected during the December 1996 Ghanaian general elections on the ticket of the New Patriotic Party for the Nkwakwa Constituency in the Eastern Region of Ghana. He polled 18,279 votes out of the 34,086 valid votes cast representing 41.40% over his opponents William Bimpong Asante an NDC member, Ebenezer Kese Antwi a CPP member, El-Abdul-Hameed Sachibu a PNC member and Kofi Frimpong a DPP member who polled 11,460 votes, 4,634 votes, 459 votes and 254 votes respectively.

He won the parliamentary seat for three consecutive terms from the 1996 elections to the 2008 Ghanaian general elections. He lost this seat to Seth Adjei Baah who represented the Independent party in the Nkawkaw constituency in the 2008 Ghanaian general elections. Adjei Baah won the elections by 19,757 votes to defeat Kwabena Adusa Okerchiri, who had 14,376 votes. In 2004, Kwabena Adusa won the elections by a total vote count of 23,706 in a percentage of 58.2%. In 2000, Kwabena Adusa won the Nkawkaw constituency parliamentary seat with 20,481 votes which is equivalent to 64.90% of the total valid votes cast. He stretched his opponents with more than half of the total votes cast. Mr. Okerchiri won on the ticket of the New Patriotic Party.William Kwasi Agyare of the National Democratic Congress had 8,574 votes which is comparable to 27.20%. Other parliamentary candidates; Ebenezer Kese Antwi of the Convention People's Party, Eugene Osei Boakye of the National Reform Party, and Tatiga Samson Basuri of the People's National Convention had 5.40%, 1.40% and 1.00% respectively. These percentages are equivalent to 1,716, 456 and 314 votes respectively.

=== 2000 Elections ===
In the year 2000, Okekyere won the general elections as the member of parliament for the Nkawkaw constituency of the Eastern Region of Ghana. He won on the ticket of the New Patriotic Party. His constituency was a part of the 18 parliamentary seats out of 26 seats won by the New Patriotic Party in that election for the Eastern Region.The New Patriotic Party won a majority total of 99 parliamentary seats out of 200 seats. Okekyere was elected with 20,481 votes. This was equivalent to 64.90% of the total valid votes cast. He was elected over William Kwasi Agyare of the National Democratic Congress, Ebenezer Kese Antwi of the Convention People's Party, Osei Aboagye Eugene of the National Reformed Party, Tatiga Samson Basuri of the Peoples National Congress. These won 8,574,1,716, 456 and 314 votes out of the total valid votes cast respectively. These were equivalent to 27.20%, 5.40%, 1.40% and 1.00% respectively of total valid votes cast.

== Personal life ==
He is a Christian.

== See also ==
- New Patriotic Party Ministers
- List of MPs elected in 1996, 2000, 2004.
- Members of parliament for the Nkawkaw constituency.
