= Albert Kwame Onwona- Agyeman =

Ghanaian politician

Albert Kwame Onwona-Agyeman

Member of Parliament for North Birim

Personal details
- Born: Oda, Eastern Region

Albert Kwame Onwona-Agyeman was a Ghanaian politician and a Second Parliamentary Secretary appointed by Dr. Kwame Nkrumah.

== Early life ==
Onwona-Agyeman hails from Oda in the Eastern Region of Ghana.

== Politics ==
Onwona-Agyeman was a member of the Convention People's Party and the Member of Parliament for North Birim.

== Career ==
Onwona-Agyeman was a former Deputy Minister of Finance during Nkrumah's regime.
