= Charles Asuako Owiredu =

Ghanaian politician

Hon. Charles Asuako Owiredu MP

Member of the Ghana Parliament for Abirem Constituency
- Incumbent
- Assumed office January 2025
- Preceded by: John Frimpong Osei

Personal details
- Born: 7 June 1975 (age 51) Akyem Afosu
- Party: New Patriotic Party
- Children: 3
- Education: Ghana National College; Komenda College of Education; University of Cape Coast; University of London; University of Sunderland
- Occupation: Politician, Diplomat
- Profession: Teacher

Charles Asuako Owiredu (born 7 June 1975) is a Ghanaian politician, diplomat who is a member of the Ghana Parliament and currently the member of parliament for Abirem Constituency in the Eastern Region of Ghana. He served as Ghana's High Commissioner to South Africa, Seychelles and Mauritius.

== Early life and education ==
Owiredu was born in AKyem Ofosu in the Birim North District in Eastern Region of Ghana. He had his O'Level education at the Ghana National College in 1993. He later obtained a Teachers' Certificate A in 1996 from the Komenda College of Education and proceeded to the University of Cape Coast for his Bachelors of Education in 2023. He obtained a Bachelors of Law from the University of London and Masters in Law from the University of Sunderland in 2021 and 2024 respectively.

== Political life ==
Charles Asuako Owiredu contested the New Patriotic Party primaries in January 2024 and beat the then incumbent member of parliament John Frimpong Osei to become the parliamentary candidate for the 2024 Ghanaian general election. In December 2024, he won the 2024 Ghanaian general election on the ticket of the New Patriotic Party with 18,008 votes representing 60% of votes cast while the National Democratic Congress (Ghana) candidate, Nurudeen Fuseini polled 12,003 representing 40% of votes cast.

He was appointed Ghana's High Commissioner to South Africa by former president Nana Akufo-Addo. He was later appointed Ghana's ambassador to Seychelles. He also doubled as is a non-resident High Commissioner to Mauritius.

He also served as Deputy Minister of Foreign Affairs under former president Nana Akufo-Addo first term in government.
