= Eric Osei-Owusu =

Ghanaian politician

Hon. Eric Osei-Owusu

Member of the Ghana Parliament for Afram Plains South Constituency
- In office 7 January 2017 – 6 January 2021
- Preceded by: Joseph Appiah Boateng
- Succeeded by: Joseph Appiah Boateng

Personal details
- Born: 11 September 1963 (age 63) Kwanim, Ghana
- Party: National Democratic Congress
- Education: Voronezh State University, Middlesex University
- Occupation: Politician
- Profession: Chief executive officer
- Committees: Agriculture Committee

Eric Osei-Owusu is a Ghanaian politician and member of the Seventh Parliament of the Fourth Republic of Ghana representing the Afram Plains South Constituency in the Eastern Region on the ticket of the National Democratic Congress.

== Early life and education ==
Osei-Owusu was born on 11 September 1963 and hails from Kwanim in the Eastern Region of Ghana. He had his diploma from Voronezh State University in Russia. He further had his bachelor's degree in business from Middlesex University in Britain in 1999.

== Career ==
Osei-Owusu was the chief executive officer of the National Food Buffer Stock Company (NAFCO) at the Ministry of Food and Agriculture in Accra.

== Politics ==
Osei-Owusu is a member of the National Democratic Party. He was the member of parliament for Afram Plains South Constituency from 2017 to 2021. During the National Democratic Congress primaries in August 2019, Osei-Owusu lost his reelection bid to Joseph Appiah Boateng to represent the Afram Plains South Constituency in parliament.

=== 2016 election ===
In the 2016 Ghanaian general election, he won the Afram Plains South Constituency parliamentary seat with 11,479 votes making 54.1% of the total votes cast whilst the NPP parliamentary candidate Hor William had 9,376 votes making 44.2% of the total votes cast and the CPP parliamentary candidate Jordan Yumbow Michael had 360 votes making 1.7% of the total votes cast.

=== Committee ===
Osei-Owusu was a member of the Agriculture Committee of Parliament.

== Personal life ==
Osei-Owusu is a Christian.

== Philanthropy ==
In June 2017, Osei-Owusu deployed 100 teachers to support education in the Afram Plains South constituency.

On 30 March 2020, he donated PPEs such as Veronica buckets, hand sanitizers, hand soaps and digital thermometers to the Kwahu Afram Plains Health Directorate in the fight against COVID-19 pandemic.

In October 2020, he donated logistics such as posters and exercise books to Kade Constituency, Abetifi Constituency, Mpraeso Constituency and Nkawkaw Constituency in the Eastern Region.
