= Esther Obeng Dapaah =

Ghanaian politician and lawyer

Hon. Esther Obeng Dapaah

Member of the Ghana Parliament for Abirem
- In office 7 January 2008 – 6 January 2013

MP for Abirem
- President: John Dramani Mahama
- Preceded by: Muhammad Mumuni

Minister for Lands Forestry and Mines
- In office January 2004 – January 2008
- President: John Kufour; John Agyekum Kufour
- Preceded by: Dominic Fobih

Personal details
- Born: 18 January 1945 (age 81)
- Party: New Patriotic Party
- Children: 3
- Education: Ghana School of Law
- Profession: Lawyer

Esther Obeng Dapaah (born 9 May 1945) is a Ghanaian politician and lawyer. She was the member of parliament for Abirem constituency in the 5th Parliament of the 4th Republic of Ghana.

== Early life and education ==
Dapaah comes from Nkwarteng, in the Eastern Region of Ghana. She was born on 9 May 1945. She received a Bachelor of Laws degree from the Chelmer Institute of Education in Essex, England, in 1977. She received another Bachelor of Laws degree from Lincoln's Inn in 1978 and from the Ghana School of Law in 1979.

== Employment ==
Obeng Dapaah is a lawyer by profession. She has worked in the London Borough of Newham as a rent enforcement officer.

== Political career ==
She is a member of the New Patriotic Party. She served under John Agyekum Kufuor as a minister of lands, forests and mines. She has been the member of Parliament for the Abirem constituency in Ghana since 2004. She was once chairman of the Committee for Women and Children and currently a member of the Committee for Constitutional and Legal Affairs. She was also a member of the Pan-African Parliament.

== Elections ==
Obeng Dapaah was elected as the member of Parliament for the 5th Parliament of the 4th Republic for the Abirem constituency in the 2008 Ghanaian general elections. She was elected with 13,319 votes out of the 21,962 valid votes cast, equivalent to 60.6% of the total valid votes.

== Personal life ==
Esther is a Christian and a member of the Church of Pentecost. She is single with three children.
