= Kwakye Addo =

Ghanaian politician (born 1951)

MP for Afram Plains South
- In office 7 January 2001 – 6 January 2005
- President: John Agyekum Kufour

Personal details
- Born: 23 February 1951 (age 75) Afram Plains South, Eastern Region Gold Coast (now Ghana)
- Party: National Democratic Congress
- Education: Abetifi Training College, Ghana
- Occupation: Politician
- Profession: Political teacher

Kwakye Addo (born 23 February 1951) is a Ghanaian politician and a member of the Second and Third Parliament of the Fourth Republic representing the Afram Plains South Constituency in the Eastern Region of Ghana.

== Early life and education ==
Addo was born on 23 February 1951 at Afram Plains south in the Eastern Region of Ghana. He attended the Abetifi Training College and obtained his Teaching Training Certificate.

== Politics ==
Addo was elected into the first parliament of the fourth republic of Ghana on 7 January 1993 after he was pronounced winner at the 1992 Ghanaian parliamentary election held on 29 December 1992. He was therefore re-elected into the second parliament of the fourth republic of Ghana on the Ticket of the National Democratic Congress after emerging winner at the December 1996 Ghanaian General elections for the Afram Plain South Constituency in the Eastern Region of Ghana. He polled 11,495 votes out of the 21,525 valid votes cast representing 42.40% over his opponents Raphael Kofi Ahaligah an IND member, Daneil Kwaku Adjepong an NPP member and Edward Ofori Addo a CPP member who polled 6,804 votes, 2,994 votes and 268 votes respectively.

In the 2000 Ghanaian General elections, He polled 7,011 votes out of the 15,209 valid votes cast representing 46.10%. He was chosen over Anthony Adongo and independent candidate, John Addo Amponsah of the New Patriotic Party, and Anthony Mensah of the National Reform Party. Mr. Adongo attained 4,660 votes which is equivalent to 30.60%. The NPP candidate John had 2,079 which is 13.70% of the total valid votes cast. Mr Mensah of the NRP had 9.60% of the votes. He was defeated by Raphael Kofi Ahaligah in the 200 parties primary elections.

== Career ==
Addo is a Political Teacher and a former member of Parliament for the Afram Plains South from 2001 to 2005.

== Personal life ==
Addo is a Christian.
