= St. Dominic Hospital =

Catholic medical facility in Akwatia, Eastern Region, Ghana

St. Dominic Catholic Hospital (SDCH)
- Ministry of Health

Geography
- Location: Akwatia, Denkyembour District, Eastern Region, Ghana

Organisation
- Care system: Public - Ghana Health Service
- Type: Not-for-profit

Services
- Beds: 357

History
- Founded: 1960

Links
- Lists: Hospitals in Ghana

St. Dominic Catholic Hospital (SDCH) is a not-for-profit Catholic medical facility located in Akwatia in the Denkyembour District in the Eastern Region of Ghana. On 10 January 2024, the hospital received a magnetic resonance imaging (MRI) scanner to be the first in the Eastern Region to receive the device. The device was inaugurated by EASE Ghana.

== History ==
The hospital was established in 1960.

In 1998, the Chaplain at the hospital was Monsignor Alex Bobby-Benson.

As at 2008, Dr Mrs Constance Addo Yobo was a chief dental surgeon at the hospital. As at 2008, Dr Mrs Mercy Dawson was a medical superintendent at the hospital.

As at 2024, the manager and administrator of the hospital is Rev. Fr. Ebenezer Kenneth Abban PhD. As at 2024, Dr Maite Alfonso Romero is the medical director of the hospital.

== Facilities ==
- COVID-19 High Dependency Unit (HDU)
- Dental clinic
- Neo Natal Intensive-Care Unit (NICU)
- Solar plant

== Controversy ==
In 2016, it was alleged the head of finance of the hospital, Mr. Yaw Opoku Agyei spearheaded fraudulent activity at the hospital which caused the Government of Ghana to lose money.

In 2022, the hospital was accused by Madam Lydia Dagasu of neglecting her baby.
