= Kade Senior High-Technical School =

Kade Senior High/Technical School

Location
- P. O. Box 134; Kade, Ghana; Eastern Region; Kade, Ghana, Eastern Region; Ghana; 6°05′46″N 0°51′01″W

Information
- School type: Government funded, Boarding/ Day
- Motto: Dwen Mprenu (Think Twice)
- Patron saint: Chief of Kade
- Established: 1982
- Founder: Nana Appiawiah I
- School board: Board of Governors
- School district: Kwaebibirem Municipal Assembly
- Oversight: Ghana Education Service
- Grades: Forms' (1–3)
- Gender: Boys
- Age range: 14–18
- Campus: Kade
- Houses: 7
- Colours: Green and cream
- Athletics: Track and Field
- Nickname: Great Kasstech
- Rival: Asuom Senior High
- USNWR ranking: Grade B
- Affiliation: Public, Ghana
- Alumni: Kade Senior High/Technical School Old Students Association(KOSA)

Kade Senior High/Technical School (Kasstech), formerly Kade Day Secondary/Technical School, is a mixed public senior high school located in Kade, the capital of the Kwaebibirem Municipal Assembly of the Eastern Region, Ghana. The motto of the school is Dwen Mprenu which means Think Twice.

== History ==
Established in 1982 by the then Chief of Kade, Nana Appiawiah I, and his elders, Kasstech had the aim of tackling the educational challenges confronted by the youth of Kade and its environs. Initially, the school started with only eight male students, operating from the abandoned match factory of the Industrial Development Corporation, set up in 1959 under Kwame Nkrumah, which is now the location of the Ghana National Fire Service station in Kade.

== Courses offered ==
Kasstech offers the following courses:

- General Science
- Business
- General Arts
- Home Economics
- Technical
- Visual Arts
- Agricultural Science

== Headmasters ==
The table below shows the list of headmasters since the school was established and their tenure of office

Headmaster	Beginning from office	End of office
S. R. Aseidu	1982	1998
John Adjei	1998	2000
Ransford Boadi-Danquah	2002	2016
Emmanuel Nana Yaw Danquah	2017	2021
Stella Oye Adjei	2022	date

== Achievement ==
- Kade Day Senior High Technical School placed 2nd Regional NCCE Quiz in 2015
- Kade Day Senior High Technical School scored 99.34 per cent in fifth place in the 2013 WASSCE rankings

=== National Maths and Science Quiz ===
In July 2024, the school qualified to the national preliminaries of the National Science and Maths Quiz and also advanced to the next stage of the Eastern Regional Championship after beating Krobo Girls SHS, St. Roses' SHS, and Boso SHTS
