= Juaso Senior High School =

School in Ghana

Juaso Senior High Technical School (often referred to as JUASHTECH) is a co-educational public senior high and technical school located in Juaso, the capital of the Asante Akim South Municipal District in the Ashanti Region of Ghana.
