= Oda Senior High School =

Location
- P. O. Box; Akim Oda; Eastern Region; Ghana; 5.969°N 0.993°W

Information
- Type: Public high school
- Established: 1960
- Status: Active
- School district: Birim Central Municipal District
- Oversight: Ministry of Education
- Head teacher: Mr. Evans K. Boafo
- Gender: Co-educational
- Age: 13 to 19
- Classes offered: General arts, Home economics, General science, Business, Visual arts, Agriculture
- Colours: Green and yellow
- Slogan: Knowledge, truth and service

Oda Senior High School (ODASCO) is a co-educational second-cycle institution in Akim Oda, situated in the Birim Central Municipal District in the Eastern Region of Ghana. The school offer courses like General Science, Agriculture, Business, Visual Arts, Home Economics and General Arts. Because of their performance in WASSCE, it has been ranked among category B.

== History ==
The school was established in 1960 with only 95 students. The Erstwhile Ghana Educational Trust (GET), under the distinguished chairmanship of Nana Ayirebi Acquah of Winneba, established the school situated at Oda Eastern Region of Ghana in the Birim South District as a co-educational boarding institution in September 1960 during the Nkrumah regime.

The late Nana Frempong Manso III, Omanhene of the Akyem Kotoku traditional area, readily offered large tract of land covering one mile square in 1957 for the construction of the school.

Hon. N. A. Welback, Minister of Works and Housing under the Nkrumah regime, officially laid the foundation stone in January 1960.

The school enrolled its first batch of students numbering eighty-seven (17) boys and fifteen (15) girls. The school was governed by an eleven-member board of governors under the able chairmanship of the late Hon. Albert Kwame Onwona Agyeman, Member of parliament North Birim and Deputy Minister of Finance in the Nkrumah regime.

The school's first headmaster between Sept 1960-Jan 1961 was the late Rev J.W. de Graft Johnson who also became the headmaster of Wesley Grammar School, Accra and Agona Swedru Secondary school. Rev. de Graft Johnson at the initial stage of his appointment had a scholarship and left for the United Kingdom and U.S.A on a study tour.

The first group of students sat for the G.C.E. “O” Level exam in October 1965 and excelled in the examination. Sixth-form (Arts & Science) courses were started in October 1968. Enrolment increased tremendously.

It is worthy of mention that from September 1960 to the present, the school has produced many prominent products. Some of these products are now owned by members of the teaching staff who hold responsible senior positions in the school [6]

== Enrollment ==
As of 2015, Oda Senior High School had a student population of 2,242 students.

== Headmasters and Headmistresses ==
Name	Tenure
David Afosah-Anim	2003 - 2015
Francis K. Appiah	2008- 2019
Madam Philomena	2019-2021
Mr. Evans Boafo	2021-2025
Mr. Eric Amoah	2025–present

== Alumni ==
- Edward Amoako Asante, Ghanaian judge
- Albert Antwi-Boasiako, public servant
- Akua Sarpong-Ayisa, Ghanaian entrepreneur
- Sammy Flex, journalist
- William Quaitoo, politician
