= Otumi =

Human settlement in Ghana

- Town
- Location within Ghana Location within Africa
- Coordinates: 6.21667°N 0.9°W
- Country: Ghana
- Region: Eastern Region, Ghana
- Districts: 1 district: Kwaebibirem Municipal District
- Settled: 15th century

Government
  - Municipal Chief Executive (MCE): Emmanuel Kofi Nti
- Time zone: UTC+00:00 (GMT)
- Area code: 030

Otumi is a town situated in Kwaebibirem District, Ghana. Ghana Oil Palm Development Company (GOPDC) currently owns two industrial plantations.
