= Apinamang =

Mining community in Eastern Region, Ghana

Akyem Apinamang Apinamang
- Town
- Location of Apinamang in Eastern Region
- Coordinates: 06°04′56.53″N 00°41′34.25″W
- Country: Ghana
- Region: Eastern Region
- District: Denkyembour
- Time zone: GMT
  - Summer (DST): GMT

Akyem Apinamang is a mining community near Akwatia in the Denkyembour District in the Eastern Region of Ghana. The people of Akyem Apinamang celebrate the Kobredwa Festival.

== History ==
In 2017, the Chief of Apinamang was Osabarima Bibiarawonemere Oware Asare Pinkro III.

In February 2023, Professor Sam Agyei-Ampomah who was the Dean of the School of Liberal Arts and Social Sciences of the Ghana Institute of Management and Public Administration was enstooled as a sub-chief of Akyem Apinamang.
