= Aperadi =

Akim Aperade Aperade
- Town
- Location of Akim Aperade in Eastern Region
- Coordinates: 5°49′N 1°00′W
- Country: Ghana
- Region: Eastern Region
- District: Birim South District
- Elevation: 541 ft (165 m)

Population
  - Ethnicity: Akan people
  - Demonym: Aperadian
- Time zone: GMT
  - Summer (DST): GMT

Akim Aperade is a small town in Achiase District, in the Eastern Region of Ghana.
