= Akyemansa District =

District in Eastern Region of Ghana

- District
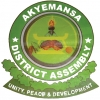
- Seal

- Districts of Eastern Region

- Location of Akyemansa District within Eastern
- Coordinates: 6°10′N 1°9′W
- Country: Ghana
- Region: Eastern
- Capital: Ofoase

Government
  - District Executive: Paul Asamoah

Population (2021 census)
  - Total: 91,038
- Time zone: UTC+0 (GMT)

Akyemansa District is one of the thirty-three districts in Eastern Region, Ghana. Originally it was formerly part of the then-larger Birim North District in 1988, which was created from the former Birim District Council, until the southern part of the district was split off to create Akyemansa District on 29 February 2008; thus the remaining part has been retained as Birim North District. The district assembly is located in the southwest part of Eastern Region and has Ofoase as its capital town. Kojo Nkrumah is the member of Parliament

== List of settlements ==
Settlements of Akyemansa District
No.	Settlement	Population	Population year
1	Ofoase	1	2022

== Sources ==
- "Akyemansa District". Statoids.
- Districts: Akyemansa District
