= William Quaitoo =

Ghanaian politician

Hon. William Agyapong Quaitoo MP

Member of the Ghana Parliament for Akim Oda Constituency
- In office 7 January 2012 – 6 January 2021
- Succeeded by: Alexander Akwasi Acquah

Deputy Minister of Agriculture
- Succeeded by: Kennedy Osei Nyarko

Personal details
- Born: 11 September 1966 (age 59) Akim Gyadam, Ghana)
- Party: New Patriotic Party
- Children: 5
- Education: University of Cape Coast, University of Ghana
- Occupation: Politician
- Profession: Manager
- Committees: Parliamentary Select Committee on Education (Chairman)

William Agyapong Quaitoo (born September 11, 1966, in Akim Gyadam) is a Ghanaian politician. He served as a member of parliament for Akim Oda Constituency, Eastern Region in the 7th Parliament. He was appointed Deputy Minister of Agriculture in 2013. He is the chief executive officer of the Tree Crops Development Authority.

== Early life and education ==
Quaitoo was born on 11 September 1966 and hails from Akim Gyadam in the Eastern Region of Ghana. He attended Kalpohin Primary School in Tamale, Yoo Roman Catholic Primary School in Savelugu and the Vitting Experimental Junior Secondary School in Tamale all in the Northern Region of Ghana. He attended Ghana Secondary Technical School for his GCE 'O' Level in Takoradi and Oda Secondary School for his GCE 'A' Level in Akim Oda. He studied at Galilee College in Israel where he obtained a Diploma in Agribusiness, Export and Marketing Management. He attended the University of Cape Coast where he graduated with a BSC (HONS) in Chemistry and Diploma in Education. He also has an MBA from the University of Ghana.

== Career ==
Quaitoo started his career in 2000 when he was appointed Market Development Manager of OIC International. He served as manager of the establishment till 2002. In 2002, he was appointed Programmes Manager of Enterprise Works, Ghana where he worked in that position till 2006. In late 2006, he was offered another appointment as Manager of Ghana Cocoa Board until 2012.

== Politics ==
Quaitoo is a member of the New Patriotic Party. He is the former Member of Parliament for Akim Oda Constituency. In 2020 during the NPP parliamentary primaries he lost his seat to Alexander Ackum.

=== 2012 election ===
In the 2012 Ghanaian general election, he won the Akim Oda Constituency parliamentary seat with 18,982 votes making 62.74% of the total votes cast whilst the NDC parliamentary candidate Kwabena Nkansah Asare had 6,315 votes making 20.87% of the total votes cast, the PPP parliamentary candidate Kofi Asamoah-Siaw had 782 votes making 2.58% of the total votes cast, the NDP parliamentary candidate Aninakwah Joshua Kwabena had 278 votes making 0.92% of the total votes cast, an Independent parliamentary candidate Baa Abora had 1,626 votes making 5.37% of the total votes cast and another Independent parliamentary candidate Augustus Ennin Attafuah had 1,993 votes making 6.59% of the total votes.

=== 2016 election ===
In the 2016 Ghanaian general election, he again won the Akim Oda Constituency parliamentary seat with 21,131 votes making 73.4% of the total votes cast whilst the NDC parliamentary candidate Kwabena Nkansah Asare had 6,892 votes making 23.9% of the total votes cast, the PPP parliamentary candidate Baa Abora had 599 votes making 2.1% of the total votes cast and the CPP parliamentary candidate George Owusu Agyemang had 161 votes making 0.6% of the total votes cast.

=== Committee ===
Quaitoo was the Chairman of the Parliamentary Select Committee on Education.

== Resignation as Deputy Minister ==
In August 2017, Quaitoo made some ethnocentric comments about people in the Northern region of Ghana. In his statement he said "Our brothers [in northern Ghana], it is so difficult to deal with them. I lived there for 27 years, I speak Dagbani like a Dagomba and all that. They are very difficult people. Nobody can substantiate. If anybody says that his farm was destroyed by armyworm, the person would have to come and prove it. We have no records of that. It's just a way of taking money from the government; that's what they do all the time." After his comment, members of the general public called for his resignation condemning the comments as being tribalistic. Following his call for resignation, on August 29, 2017, he resigned officially from his office as Deputy Minister of Agriculture. He was succeeded by Kennedy Osei Nyarko.

== Personal life ==
Quaitoo is married with five children. He is a Christian and worships as a Baptist. He speaks English, Twi, Dagbani, Hausa and Ga.
