= Kojo Oppong Nkrumah =

Ghanaian politician and lawyer

Hon. Kojo Oppong Nkrumah
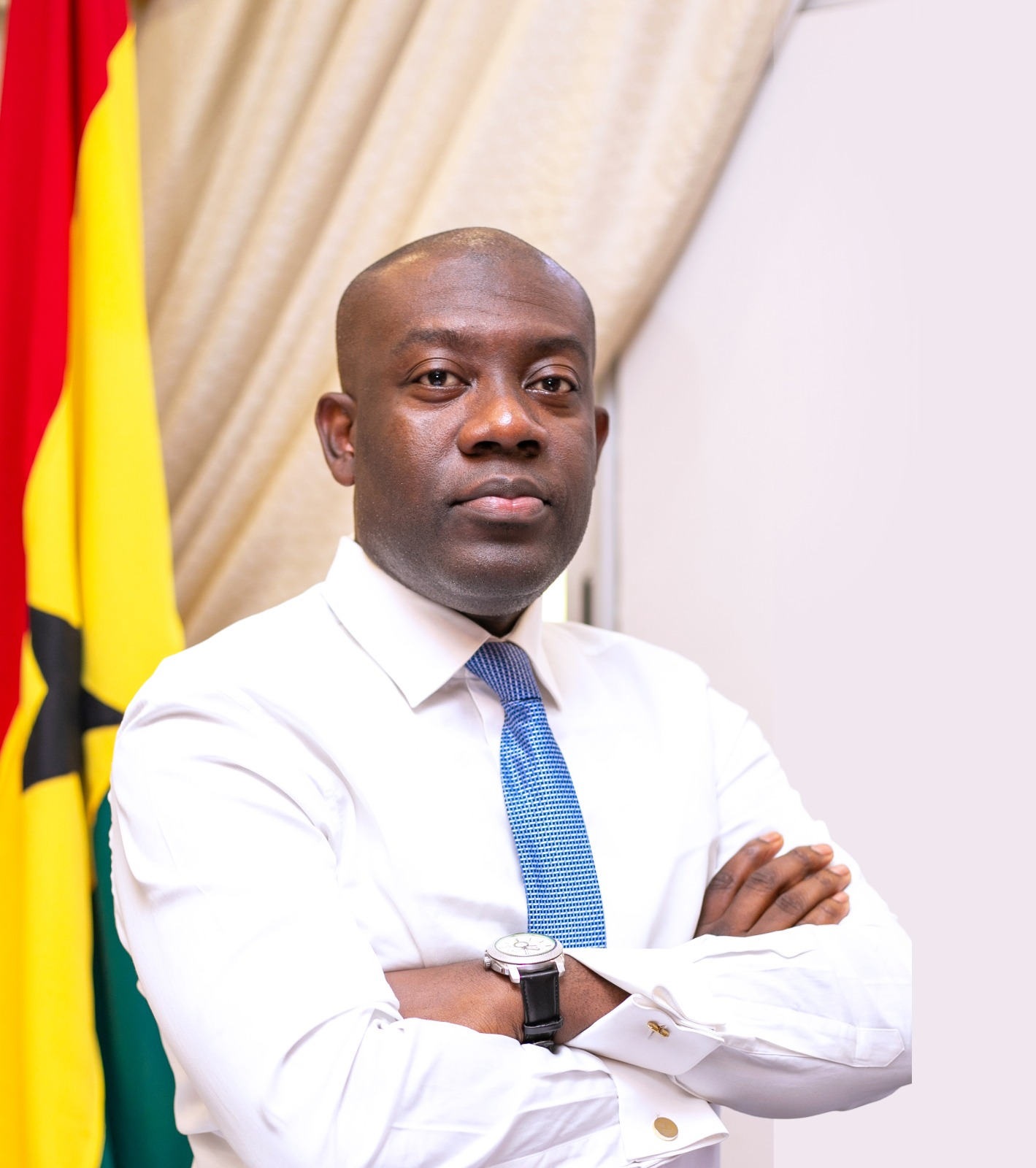

Member of Parliament for Ofoase-Ayirebi
- Incumbent
- Assumed office 7 January 2017

Deputy Minister for Information
- In office January 2017 – November 2018

Minister for Information
- In office November 2018 – February 2024
- Preceded by: Dr. Mustapha Abdul-Hamid
- Succeeded by: Fatimatu Abubakar

Minister of Works and Housing
- In office 19 February 2024 – January 2025
- Preceded by: Asenso Boakye

Personal details
- Born: Kojo Oppong Nkrumah; 5 April 1982 (age 44) Koforidua, Ghana
- Party: New Patriotic Party
- Spouse: Akua Oppong Nkrumah
- Children: 4
- Education: Pope John Senior High School and Minor Seminary; University of Cape Coast; University of Ghana; GIMPA
- Occupation: Politician, Lawyer, Farmer
- Website: http://www.konkrumah.com/
- Nickname: KON

Kojo Vincent Oppong Nkrumah (born 5 April 1982) is a Ghanaian politician and lawyer. He is the member of parliament for the Ofoase-Ayirebi constituency. He previously served as the Minister of Information from November 2018 and later as the Minister for Works and Housing during the NPP tenure of office.

== Early life ==
Nkrumah was born in Koforidua, in the Eastern Region of Ghana. His parents are Kwame Oppong Nkrumah and Felicia Oppong Nkrumah. His mother was a teacher and his father was initially a teacher before becoming a banker. He hails from Akim Anyinase.

== Education ==
Nkrumah had his basic school education at St. Bernadette Soubirous School in Dansoman, continued to Pope John Senior High School and Minor Seminary in Koforidua for his senior high education, and later studied at the University of Cape Coast, where he received a bachelor's degree in Commerce. In 2012, he graduated with an MBA in Marketing from the University of Ghana, Legon. In 2014, he was awarded a bachelor's degree in law (LLB) at the GIMPA Faculty of Law after two years of studies. In 2016, he was called to the Bar as a barrister and solicitor of the Supreme Court of Ghana.

Before embarking on his legal career, he had undertaken and successfully completed a Fellowship with the African Leadership Initiative. This experience not only enriched his knowledge and perspective but also contributed significantly to his personal and professional growth.

To give back to society, Nkrumah founded the Oppong Nkrumah Education and Skills Development Fund in 2017 to provide education and skills development support for the youth of his constituency. As at 2022, the fund provided scholarships to more than 300 constituents across different tertiary institutions in the country.

== Career ==
Nkrumah started his career as a Treasury Analyst at British American Tobacco in 2006. He moved on to Joy FM as a broadcast journalist, hosting the Super Morning Show after the departure of host Komla Dumor. In 2014, Nkrumah bowed out of broadcasting to establish an investment firm, West Brownstone Capital. By 2016, he had become a lawyer, practising at Kulendi, Attafuah and Amponsah at law. In 2023, Oppong Nkrumah chaired the Africa Internet Governance Forum (AfIGF) where he called for coordinated measures to combat online misinformation and disinformation across the continent.

He was selected as one of the world's 115 Young Global Leaders for 2020 by the World Economic Forum.

According to data released by the Ghana Audit Service obtained via a Right to Information request, Oppong Nkrumah filed his asset declarations in September 2017 and January 2021,though he omitted the mandatory conclusion of the administration's first term.

== Politics ==
In 2015, he contested and won the NPP parliamentary primaries for Ofoase-Ayirebi constituency in the Eastern Region of Ghana.

He subsequently won this parliamentary seat during the 2016 Ghanaian general elections. He is the longest-serving Minister for Information serving in this portfolio from 2018 to February 2024 before his appointment as Minister for Works and housing the same year.

He additionally served as a member of the Finance and Constitutional committees of the 7th and 8th Parliament of Ghana.

In August 2023, Kojo Oppong Nkrumah, as the Minister of Information, urged CSOs and media to back efforts for diplomatic resolution to the crisis in Niger.

In January 2024, he was maintained as the parliamentary candidate of the New Patriotic Party for the Ofoase-Ayirebi (Ghana parliament constituency).

He subsequently won the parliamentary election during the 2024 Ghanaian general election garnering 18,601 of the total valid votes.

In 2026,he introduced the public financial management(Amendment) Bill as a Private Member's Bill designed to strengthen fiscal discipline and restrict off-plan spending by public ministries.

== Personal life ==
Kojo is married to Akua, and they are both devoted Christians. They have four children so far, Kwaku, Afua, Araba and Kofi.

== Philanthropy ==
In March 2020, Kojo Nkrumah donated various personal protective and sanitary supplies to two health facilities in Akyem Oda and Akyem Ofoase in the Eastern Region to fight against COVID 19. The donated items, which included alcohol-based hand sanitizers, gun thermometers, Veronica buckets, examination gloves, face masks, washing bowls, liquid soap, and tissue paper, were given to the Oda Government Hospital and the Akyemansa District Health Directorate.

Minister of Information Kojo Oppong Nkrumah gifted a Public Address (PA) system to the Gbewaa Palace in Yendi, located in the Northern Region on August 5, 2021. This donation was made to fulfill a promise the minister had made to Ya Na Abukari Mahama II, the Overlord of the Dagbon Traditional Area, during a working tour of Northern Ghana earlier that year.

Kojo Nkrumah together with his family donated to the Nsawam Prisons during his 42nd birthday celebration with important items such as rice, beans, gari, sachets of water, t-rolls, washing powder, oil and medical supplies on Friday, April 5, 2024.
