= Seth Adjei Baah =

Ghanaian politician

Member of the Ghana Parliament for Nkawkaw
- In office 7 January 2009 – 6 January 2013
- President: John Evans Atta Mills

Personal details
- Born: 18 May 1960 (age 66)
- Children: 4
- Education: Trinity College and University, Madrid, Spain
- Occupation: Politician
- Profession: Businessman

Seth Adjei Baah (born May 18, 1960) is a businessman and a politician. He was a former Member of Parliament for the Nkawkaw constituency of the Eastern region of Ghana.

== Early life and education ==
Baah was born in 1960. He hails from Kwahu-Asakraka in the Eastern region of Ghana. He studied at Trinity College and University, Madrid, Spain where he earned a Bachelor of Arts degree.

== Personal life and career ==
Baah is a Christian and married with four children. He worships with the Church of Pentecost. He is a businessman and the CEO of Shaaba Enterprises Limited. From January 2011 to January 2016 he was the president of the Chamber of Commerce and Industry of Ghana. He is also the president of the Pan African Chamber of Commerce and Industry (PACCI)

== Politics ==
Baah's political career began 2008 when he became a member of the Fifth Parliament of the Fourth Republic of Ghana for the Nkwakwa constituency as an independent member. He lost the New Patriotic Party parliamentary primaries in 2008 at Nkawkaw constituency and therefore, decided to stand as an independent candidate and won the elections. He won the seat with a total number of 21, 640 votes out of the 40, 004 valid votes cast making 54.1%. He lost his seat in the 2012 Ghanaian general elections to the New Patriotic Party's Eastern Regional treasurer, Eric Kwakye Daffour. After that he regretted going into Politics.
