= Ofoase-Ayirebi (Ghana parliament constituency) =

Ghana parliament constituency

- constituency for the Parliament of Ghana
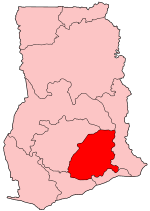
- District: Akyemansa District
- Region: Eastern Region of Ghana

Current constituency
- Party: New Patriotic Party
- MP: Kojo Oppong Nkrumah

Ofoase and Ayirebi are two of the four area councils that constitute the Akyemansa District.

Kojo Oppong Nkrumah is the member of parliament for the constituency. He was elected on the ticket of the New Patriotic Party (NPP). and won a majority of 17,796 votes to become the MP. He had represented the constituency in the 7th parliament of the 4th Republic held on the 7th of December 2016.

== See also ==
- List of Ghana Parliament constituencies
