= Topremang =

Town in Denkyembour district in Ghana

Topremang is a town in the district of Denkyembour in the Eastern Region of Ghana.
