= Birim Central Municipal District =

Municipal District in the Eastern Region of Ghana

- Municipal District
- Seal

- Districts of Eastern Region

- Location of Birim Central Municipal District within Eastern
- Coordinates: 5°55′29.89″N 0°58′55.78″W
- Country: Ghana
- Region: Eastern
- Capital: Akim Oda

Government
  - Municipal Chief Executive: Ophelia Koomson

Area
  - Total: 1,090 km^{2} (420 sq mi)

Population (2021)
  - Total: 76,302
- Time zone: UTC+0 (GMT)
- Website: Official Website

Birim Central Municipal District is one of the thirty-three districts in Eastern Region, Ghana. Originally created as an ordinary district assembly in 1988 when it was known as the first Birim South District, which it was created from the former Birim District Council, until the western part of the district was split off to create a new Birim South District, with Akim Swedru as its capital town; thus the remaining part has been renamed as Birim Central Municipal District on 29 February 2008, with Akim Oda as its capital town, which it was elevated to municipal district assembly status on that same year. However on 15 March 2018, the southeast part of the district was split off to become Asene-Manso-Akroso District; thus the remaining part has been retained as Birim Central Municipal District. The municipality is located in the southwest part of Eastern Region and has Akim Oda as its capital town.

== Boundaries ==
Birim Central Municipal District is located in the southwestern corner of the Eastern Region. To the north is the Birim North and Kwaebibirem Districts and to the west, the Adansi South District in the Ashanti and the Assin North District. Birim Central Municipal district's southern neighbours are Asikuma-Odoben-Brakwa and Agona West Municipal Districts in Central Region. The West Akim Municipal District lies to the east of Birim Central Municipal District.

== Tourism ==
The Big Tree is one of the major attractions in Birim Central Municipal District. It is believed to be the biggest in West Africa and measures 12 metres in circumference and 66.5 metres in height. The tree is in the Esen Epan Forest Reserve, one of 9 forest reserves in the Birim Central Municipal District.

== List of settlements ==
Settlements of Birim Central Municipal District
No.	Settlement	Population	Population year
1	Akim Oda	60,604	2013
