= Akim Oda (Ghana parliament constituency) =

Constituency in Ghana

- constituency for the Parliament of Ghana
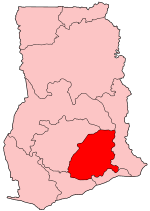
- District: Birim Central Municipal District
- Region: Eastern Region of Ghana

Current constituency
- Party: New Patriotic Party
- MP: Alexander Akwasi Acquah

Alexander Akwasi Acquah is the member of parliament for the Akim Oda constituency in Ghana's 8th parliament under the fourth republic. The first time MP was elected on the ticket of the New Patriotic Party (NPP). With a majority of 25,380 votes out of the 31,943 total votes cast (which represents 79.45%), he defeated his opponents and won the seat as the 5th MP for the Constituency. He succeeded William Quaitoo who represented the constituency for eight years from 2012 to 2020 on the ticket of the New Patriotic Party (NPP). Before him was Yaw Owusu-Boateng as the member of parliament for the constituency for four years (2008-2012) until a new constituency was created out of the Akim Oda constituency in 2012 which had him representing the newly created Constituency, Asene Akoroso Manso on the ticket of the New Patriotic Party (NPP) that year.

== Members of Parliament ==
First elected	Member	Party
First Republic - Oda
1965	Albert Kwame Onwona-Agyemang	Convention People's Party
Second Republic
1969	Samuel Benson Adjepong	Progress Party
Third Republic
1979	S. B. Attafua	People's National Party
Fourth Republic - Akim Oda
1992	Nana Boaten-Abora	National Democratic Congress
1996	Yaw Osafo-Maafo	New Patriotic Party
2008	Yaw Owusu-Boateng	New Patriotic Party
2012	William Quaitoo	New Patriotic Party
2020	Alexander Akwasi Acquah	New Patriotic Party
2024	Alexander Akwasi Acquah	New Patriotic Party

== Elections ==
2024 Ghanaian general election: Akim Oda
Party	Candidate	Votes	%	±%
NPP	Alexander Akwasi Acquah	19,341	72.18	−7.27
NDC	Jones Asante	7,455	27.82	+8.22
Majority		11,886	44.36	—
Turnout		26,973		
Registered electors				

2020 Ghanaian general election: Akim Oda
Party	Candidate	Votes	%	±%
NPP	Alexander Akwasi Acquah	25,380	79.45	—
NDC	Jones Asante	6,262	19.60	+—
Ghana Union Movement	Lucy Ansah	301	0.94	−—
Majority		19,118	59.85	
Turnout		31,943		
Registered electors				

Alexander Akwasi Acquah was elected as MP for the constituency in 2020 with 25,380 votes representing 79.45% on the ticket of NPP.

== See also ==
- List of Ghana Parliament constituencies
