= Joseph Appiah Boateng =

Ghanaian politician

Hon Joseph Appiah Boateng
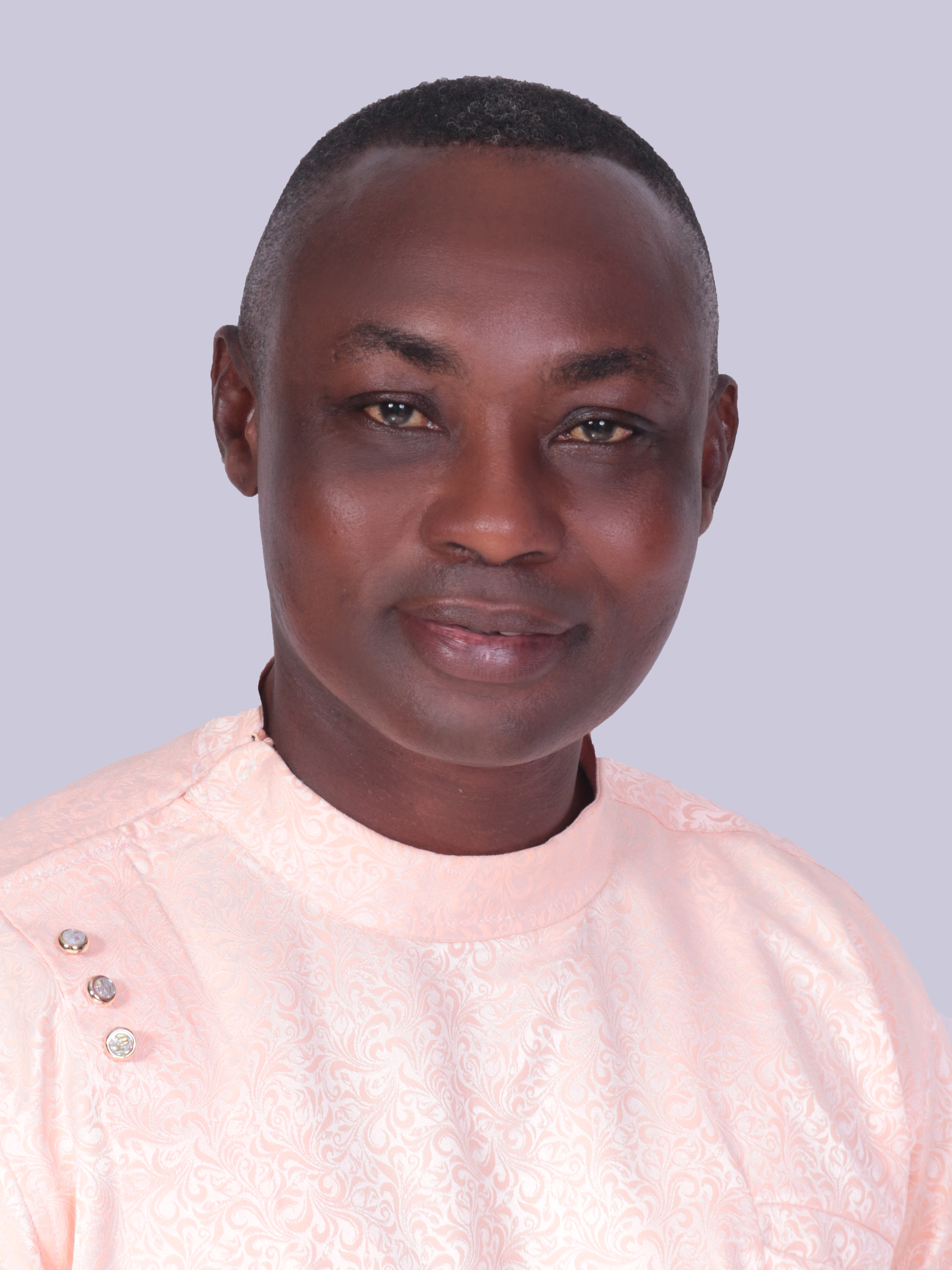

Member of the Ghana Parliament for Afram Plains South
- Incumbent
- Assumed office 7 January 2021
- Preceded by: Eric Osei-Owusu

Personal details
- Born: Joseph Appiah Boateng; 24 August 1975 (age 51) Obo Kwahu, Ghana
- Party: National Democratic Congress
- Education: Australia Nursing College
- Occupation: Politician
- Profession: Architect
- Committees: Government Assurance Committee, Environment, Science and Technology Committee

Joseph Appiah Boateng (affectionately known as JAB1) is a Ghanaian politician and member of the National Democratic Congress. He is the member of parliament for Afram Plains South in the Eastern Region of Ghana.

== Early life and education ==
Joseph was born on 4 August 1975 in Obo-Kwahu in the Eastern region. He had Diploma in Nursing at the Australia Nursing College in 2008–2011 in Paramatta. He also had his Post-Graduate in Strategic Management in 2020.

== Politics ==
He is a member of National Democratic Congress. He was a committee member of Selection, Lands and Forestry. In 2016, Joseph opted out of the parliamentary race after a court granted a motion by Dickson Adjei Danso that he should be prevented due to a criminal case against Joseph.

=== 2012 election ===
In the 2012 Ghanaian general election, he won the Afram Plains South Constituency parliamentary seat with 14,946 votes making 61.46% of the total votes cast whilst the NPP parliamentary candidate Adongo Anthony had 7,348 votes making 30.22% of the total votes cast, an Independent parliamentary candidate Ahaligah Rapahel Kofi had 1,814 votes making 7.46% of the total votes cast and the CPP parliamentary candidate Darfour Janet had 209 votes making 0.86% of the total votes cast.

=== 2020 election ===
In the 2020 Ghanaian general election, he won the Afram Plains South Constituency parliamentary seat with 18,246 votes making 66.24% of the total votes cast whilst the NPP parliamentary candidate Willie Horr had 9,300 votes making 33.76% of the total votes cast.

=== Committees ===
He is a member of the Government Assurance Committee and also a member of the Environment, Science and Technology Committee.

== Employment ==
Joseph is a development worker/architect/quantity surveyor. He was the CEO of Twenties Jog Company Limited in Sowutuom, Accra. He was the sales manager for Twimbros Enterprise from 1996 to 2007. He also worked at Regis Care as a Nurse from 2008 to 2011.

== Personal life ==
Joseph is married with three children. He is a Christian (Church of Pentecost)

== Philanthropy ==
He has embarked on projects such as schools, provision of street lights and boreholes.

== Controversy ==
It was alleged he was deported from Ghana, later joined the National Democratic Congress and represented the Afram Plains South Constituency in Parliament in 2012. It was alleged he committed crimes in New Zealand and Australia. On 8 December 2017, he was cleared of any wrongdoing as there were not adequate evidence to back the allegation.
