= Birim South District =

District in the Eastern Region of Ghana

- District
- Seal

- Districts of Eastern Region

- Location of Birim South District within Eastern
- Coordinates: 5°53′39.98″N 1°0′55.22″W
- Country: Ghana
- Region: Eastern
- Capital: Akim Swedru

Government
  - District Executive: Baffour Mensah-Takyi
  - Presiding Member: Kwaku Amoah Bosompem

Area
  - Total: 231.7 km^{2} (89.5 sq mi)

Population (2021)
  - Total: 35,654
  - Density: 153.9/km^{2} (399/sq mi)
- Time zone: UTC+0 (GMT)
- Area code: +233 34 292
- Website: Official Website

Birim South District is one of the thirty-three districts in Eastern Region, Ghana. Originally it was formerly part of the then-larger and first Birim South District (with Akim Oda as its capital town) in 1988, which was created from the former Birim District Council, until the western part of the district was split off to create a new Birim South District on 29 February 2008; thus the remaining part has been renamed as Birim Central Municipal District, with Akim Oda as its capital town. However, on 15 March 2018, the eastern part of the district was split off to become Achiase District; thus, the remaining part has been retained as Birim South District. The district assembly is located in the southwest part of Eastern Region and has Akim Swedru as its capital town.

== Boundaries ==
The Birim South District is located in the south of Eastern Ghana. It is bordered on the northeast by the Birim Central Municipal District. To the west is the Assin North Municipal District in the Central Region and to the south, the newly created Achiase District and Agona West District, also in the Central Region.

== Geography ==
The district covers an area of 299.5 square kilometres. Within it are a lot of hills, streams and rivers. It has 2 peak rain seasons during May–June and September–October. The relative humidity ranges from 56% during the dry season and 70% during the rainy season. The district lies within a semi-deciduous rainforest region. The Birim River flows through Birim South District.

== Demographics ==
The population of Birim South District in the 2021 census was 35,654. This is down from the 2010 figure of 46,551. The sex distribution is 48.9% male and 51.1% female. The proportion of people living in rural areas remained about the same 56.7& (previously 56% of the population) and 43.3% live in uban areas. The district has a relatively young age distribution. Those between 15 and 64 years make up 59.5% of the population. The young (0 - 14 years) are 34% and the elderly (65 years and over) are 6.4%. The literacy rate is 79.5%. Akans make up the largest ethnic group and are 79.8% of the total.

== Administration ==
The highest political and administrative body in the district is the District Assembly. The District Executive is the political and administrative head. The assembly also has a presiding member who is the chairperson. There are 3 sub-district councils. They are the Akim Swedru Urban Council, Achiasi Town Council and the Aperadi Area Council.

== List of settlements ==
The town of Akim Swedru, is the capital. The other major settlements in the Birim South district are Achiasi and Aperadi. Achiasi is the main commercial centre.

Settlements of Birim South District
| No. | Settlement | Population | Population year |
| 1 | Achiasi | | |
| 2 | Adiembra | | |
| 3 | Aduasa | | |
| 4 | Aggreykrom | | |
| 5 | Akim Swedru | 10,379 | 2013 |
| 6 | Akortekrom | | |
| 7 | Akyem Swedru | | |
| 8 | Anamase | | |
| 9 | Anyinam | | |
| 10 | Aperadi | | |
| 11 | Apoli | | |
| 12 | Awisa | | |
| 13 | Bieni | | |
| 14 | Bomoden | | |
| 15 | Duakon | | |
| 16 | Kokobeng | | |
| 17 | Nyankomase | | |
| 18 | Osorase | | |

== See also ==
- Eastern Region
- Akim Swedru

== Sources ==
- "Birim South District". Statoids.
- Districts: Birim South District
- Birim South District Official Website
