= Achiase Senior High School =

Second cycle co-ed school in Akim Achiase, Ghana

Coordinates: 5.810306°N 1.006368°W

Akim Achiase Senior High School is a second cycle co-educational institution located in Akim Achiase in the Achiase District, near Akim Oda in the Eastern Region of Ghana. The school has its motto in the Akan language reading "Nsiye Bu Mmusu Abasa Mu" which means Perseverance Conquers Difficulties. It has the nickname of ACHISEC. Old students of Achisec have an association called OSAASSS formed to support the development of the school. Achisec can boast of their powerful cadet because they are situated in the same town with Ghana Army's Jungle Warfare School named, Seth Anthony Barracks. The colours of their school uniforms include blue, yellow and green. The school currently offers the following courses: General Science, Business, General Arts, General Agriculture, Home Economics and Visual Arts.

== History ==
The school was established in 1983 by a Methodist church of Ghana missionary school.

== Headmasters ==
- Frank GYIMAH Aniagyei 2025 to date
- Eric Amoah - 2019 - 2025
- Alex Badji- 2017 to 2019
- Frank Yao Dzamaklu
- Kofi Acheampong

== School Motto ==
Nsiye Bu Mmusu Abasa Mu

== School Accommodation ==
Day/Boarding

== Gender ==
Mixed

== School Category ==
Category B

== School Courses ==
- Business
- Agriculture
- Home Economics
- Visual Art
- General Arts
- General Science
