= John Frimpong Osei =

Ghanaian politician

Hon. John Frimpong Osei MP
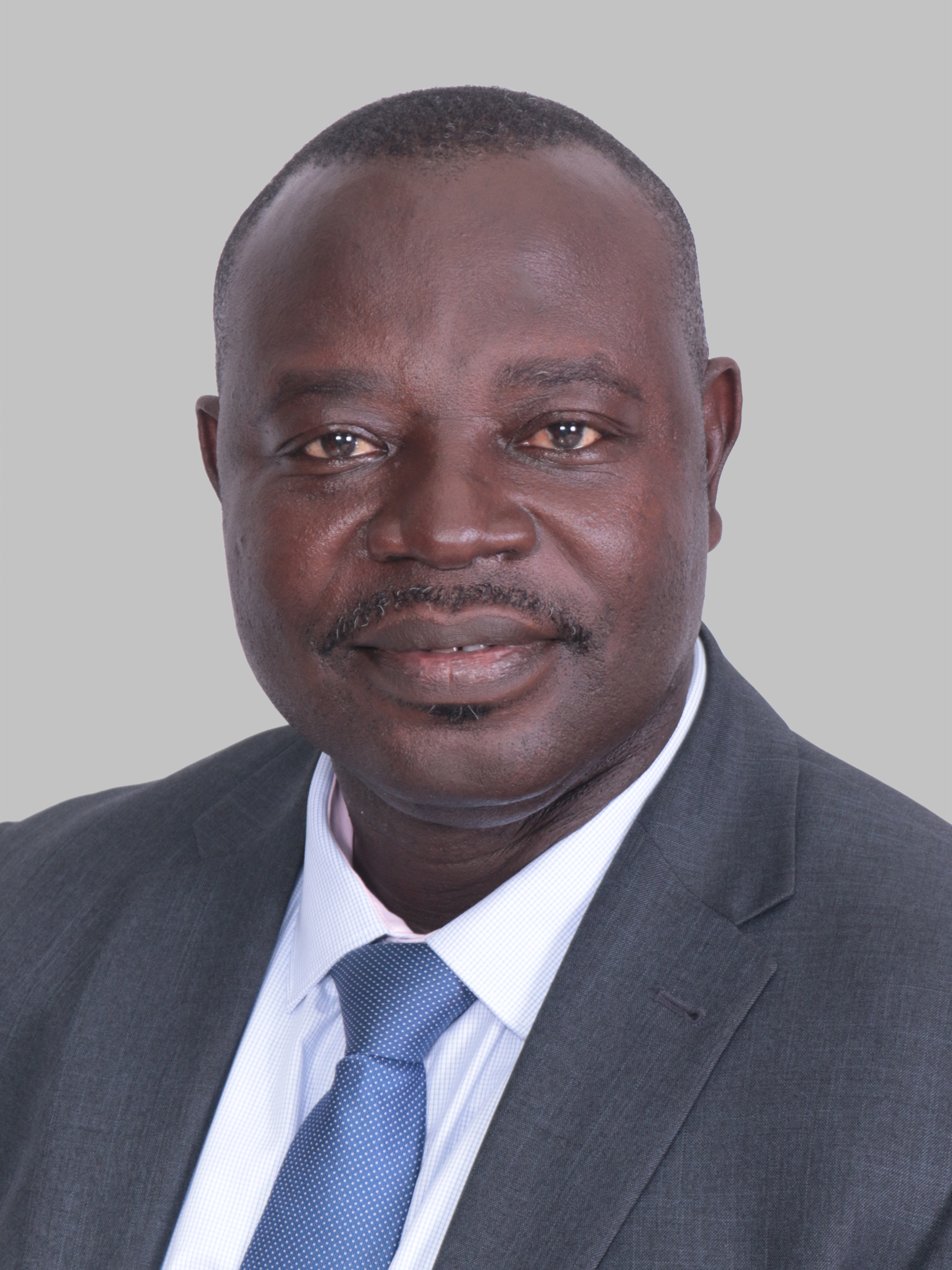

Member of the Ghana Parliament for Abirem Constituency

Personal details
- Born: 5 March 1971 (age 55)
- Party: New Patriotic Party

John Frimpong Osei (born 5 March 1971) is a Ghanaian politician who was a member of the Seventh Parliament of the Fourth Republic of Ghana and currently a member of the Eighth Parliament of the Fourth Republic of Ghana representing the Abirem Constituency in the Eastern Region on the ticket of the New Patriotic Party.

== Early life and education ==
John Frimpong was born in Akim Ntronang in the Eastern Region of Ghana. John Frimpong had his Middle School Certificate in 1986. He later obtained his Ordinary Level in 1991 and Advanced Level in 1993. John Frimpong proceeded to have his Bachelor of Arts (Geography Resource Development) in 1998 and M.PHIL (Micro Finance Geography) in 2004 from the University of Ghana, Legon – Ghana.

== Career ==
John Frimpong was the manager of O-M Finance and Business Service Limited from 1999 to 2000, He was also the special assistant to the ministry from 2002 to 2005 at the Ministry of Finance and Economic Planning and the Ministry of Education as well as the Ministry of Youth and Sports. John Frimpong is now working as the Member of Parliament (MP) for Abirem Constituency.

== Political life ==
John Frimpong won the parliamentary seat in his constituency (Abirem Constituency) in the Eastern Region during the 2016 Ghanaian general elections on the ticket of the New Patriotic Party to join the Seventh (7th) Parliament of the Fourth Republic of Ghana with 19208 votes (61.0%) against Mavis Ama Frimpong of the National Democratic Congress who had 12,217 votes (38.8%). He won again in the 2020 Ghanaian general elections on the ticket of the New Patriotic Party to join the Eighth (8th) Parliament of the Fourth Republic of Ghana with 19,151 votes (55.2%) against Mavis Ama Frimpong of the National Democratic Congress who had 15,110 votes (43.5%).

He lost in the NPP 2024 parliamentary primaries.

=== Committees ===
John Frimpong is a member of the Food, Agriculture and Cocoa Affairs Committee as the chairman. He is also a member of Privileges Committee of the Eighth (8th) Parliament of the Fourth Republic of Ghana.

== Personal life ==
John Frimpong is a Christian.

== Philanthropy ==
John Frimpong has donated 100 pieces of street bulbs to help stop ritual killings at night in his municipality. According to John Frimpong, it came to his noticed that, for some past months in 2022, mad women have been killed which their body parts were removed calling it to be ritual killings.

== Awards ==
John Frimpong was awarded as United Clergy International Association (UCIA) 2020 Hall Of Fame Award For Excellence In Leadership by The United Clergy International Association (UCIA) held its 11th edition of the awards at All Nations University on 8 August 2020.
