= Joseph Frempong =

Ghanaian politician

Hon. Joseph Frempong
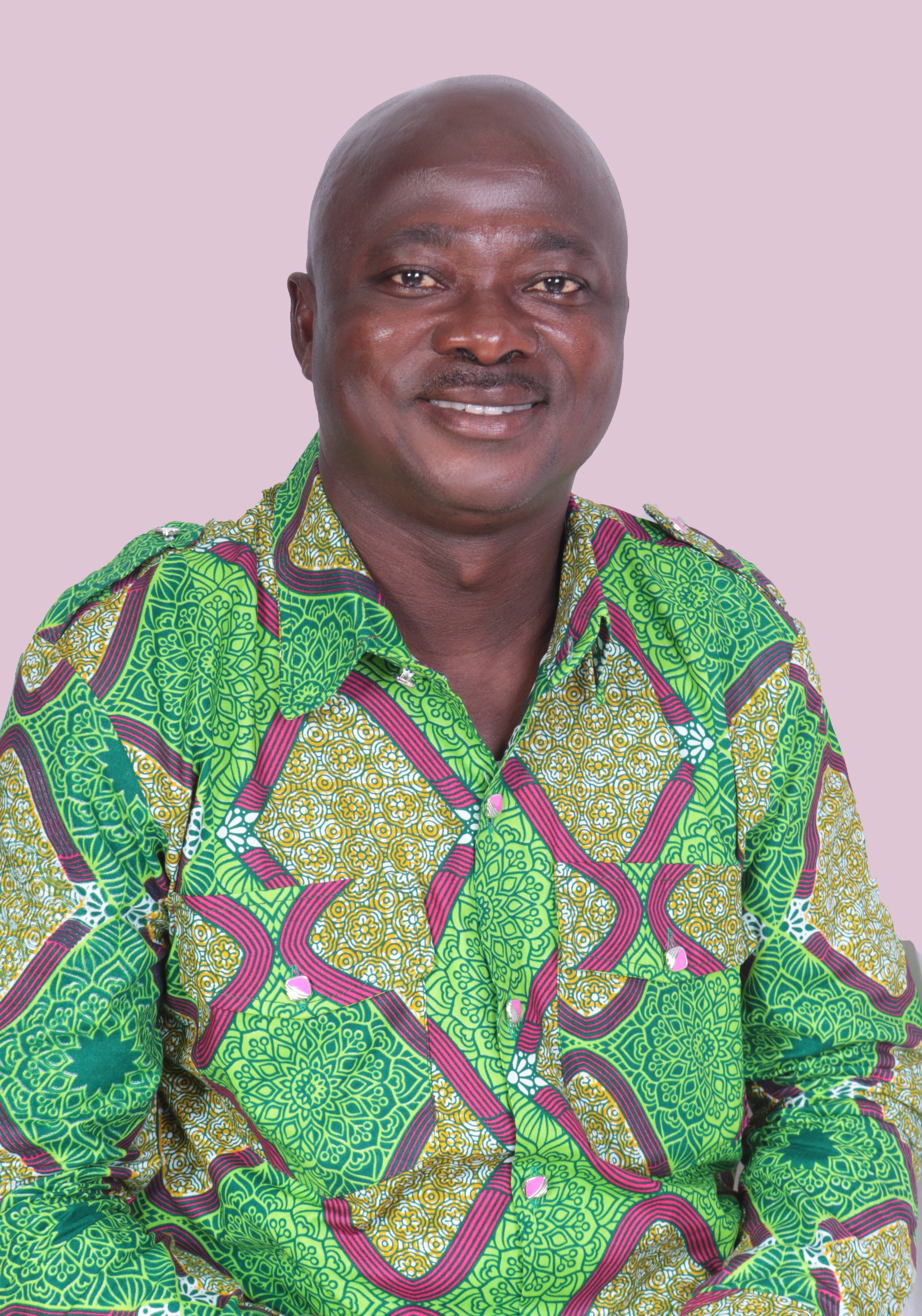

Member of Parliament for Nkawkaw Constituency
- Incumbent
- Assumed office 7 January 2021

Personal details
- Born: Joseph Frimpong; 16 July 1969 (age 57) Obo Kwahu, Ghana
- Party: New Patriotic Party
- Occupation: Politician
- Profession: Lecturer
- Committees: Gender and Children committee; Communications Committee

Joseph Frimpong is a Ghanaian politician and member of the Eighth Parliament of the Fourth Republic of Ghana representing the Nkawkaw Constituency in the Eastern Region on the ticket of the New Patriotic Party.

== Early life and education ==
Frempong was born on 16 July 1969 and hails from Obo Kwahu in the Eastern Region. He completed his GCE O level in 1990 and his GCE A level in 1992. He later obtained his bachelor's degree in Social Studies in 2004. He further had his master's degree in Public Affairs in 2011.

== Career ==
Frempong was a teacher at Adosu Islamic School. He was also the Geography teacher at the Sendema Senior High Technical School. He was also the Geography teacher at Nkawkaw Senior High School. He was also the Assistant Lecturer at the University of Education, Winneba.

=== Political career ===
Frempong is a member of the NPP and currently the MP for the Nkawkaw Constituency in the Eastern region. In the 2020 Ghana general elections, he won the parliamentary seat with 44,067 votes, while the NDC parliamentary aspirant Oppong Francis had 14,272 votes.

==== Committees ====
Frempong is a member of the Gender and Children committee and also a member of Communications Committee.

== Personal life ==
Frempong is a Christian.

== Philanthropy ==
In August 2021, Frempong helped over 15,000 people in his constituency to either renew or register for the National Health Insurance Scheme. He also presented electric beds to the Nkawkaw Municipality health directorate.
