= Dampong =

- Town
- Location in Ghana
- Coordinates: 6°33′15″N 1°02′45″W
- Country: Ghana
- Region: Ashanti Region
- District: Asante Akim South District

Dampong is a town in the Asante Akim South, a district in the Ashanti Region of Ghana.

== Education ==
There is a Secondary school at Dampong called Jubilee Mission Senior High School which was opened in September 2007 by Ashanti Akim Community Organisation AACO.

== Citizens abroad ==
There is DAMPONG DIASPORA ASSOCIATION(DDA) Dampong citizens in the Diaspora whose aim is to help in the development of the town. The association was founded by Mr Appiah Ofosu-hene a citizen of Dampong based in the UK. The association is involved in the development of the town and has established a development committee with an office in the town. This group has been involved in various programs and as of March 2023 helping in fixing an abandoned public place of convenience and other things. Under the able leadership of the current executives being led by the Chairman Rev. Yaw Adu-Dwumaa who is based in the UK.
