= Adonten Senior High School =

Coordinates: 5.841307185729781°N 0.1875246255944478°W

- Aburi; Eastern Region; Ghana

Information
- Type: Public high school
- Established: 1957; 69 years ago
- Founder: Moses Agyare Kwabi
- Status: Active
- School district: Akuapim South Municipal District
- Oversight: Ministry of Education
- Gender: Co-educational
- Age: 14 to 18
- Classes offered: General Arts, Home Economics, General Science, General Agriculture, Business, Visual Arts
- Language: English
- Houses: 4

Adonten Senior High School is a coeducational first-cycle institution located south of Aburi in the Eastern Region of Ghana.

The school runs courses in Business, Science, general arts, general agric, Home Economics and visual arts, leading to the award of a West African Senior School Certificate (WASSCE).

== History ==
The school was established in 1957 by Moses Agyare Kwabi and Djan Opare-Addo (both retired Circuit Court Judges) as a private school. However, in 1963, the Ministry of Education took charge of the school and changed it into the public system as a day secondary school with hostel attached.

In 1972–73 academic year, the Government of Ghana fully took over the running of the school. The Objective was to maintain self-discipline and moral uprightness to improve discipline and to provide full secondary school education to the growing number of boys and girls, especially those resident around the Akuapem North and South community.

The school runs both day, boarding and hostel system with majority of the students in the boarding house.

== School Code ==
0020302

== School Motto ==
Brighten Your Corner

== School Slogan ==
Mpanyin Ahyia

== School Category ==
Category B

== Enrollment ==
The school has about 2,500 students enrolled in Business, Science, general arts, general agric, Home Economics and visual arts courses.

== Facilities ==
- 3 Science Laboratories ( Physics, Biology and Chemistry)
- I.C.T Lab
- Library
- Home Economics Lab
- Visual Arts Center
- School Farm
- Sports (standard field for soccer and athletics, basketball court, volley and handball court)
- School Clinic
- Barbering shop

== See also ==
- Education in Ghana
- List of senior high schools in Ghana
