= Obogu =

- Village
- Location in Ghana
- Coordinates: 06°31′15″N 01°07′06″W
- Country: Ghana
- Region: Ashanti Region
- District: Asante Akim South District

Government
- Elevation: 46 ft (14 m)
- Time zone: GMT
  - Summer (DST): GMT

Obogu is a Town in Ashanti Akim South district the southern part of the Ashanti of Ghana. The Town has different ethnic groups but largely occupied by the Ashanti people. The main occupation is farming. There is a river called Yaa Yaa-Mu. The Town has a population of about 15,000 people The kinship of Obogu is aligned to the Asante Kingdom. The mayor is Godfred Abrokwa.
