= Ekow Benson =

Ghanaian footballer

Personal information
- Full name: Ekow Benson
- Date of birth: April 23, 1989 (age 37)
- Place of birth: Akwatia, Ghana
- Height: 1.74 m (5 ft 9 in)
- Position: Midfielder

Team information
- Current team: Asante Kotoko F.C.
- Number: 10

Youth career
- 1999–2003: New Odona Schalke O4
- 2004–2006: Fauzan FC

Senior career*
Years	Team	Apps	(Gls)
2006–2008	Tema Youth		
2008–2010	Hearts of Oak		
2010–2011	Tema Youth		
2011–2012	Asante Kotoko F.C.		
2012–2013	Medeama SC		
2013–	Tema Youth		

International career
2008	Ghana	1	(0)
- * Club domestic league appearances and goals

Ekow Benson (born April 23, 1989, in Akwatia) is a Ghanaian football player, he is currently attached to Asante Kotoko F.C.

== Career ==
Benson began his career for New Odona Schalke 04 and joined in 2004 to Fauzan FC. After two years for Fauzan, he joined in January 2006 to Tema Youth who has been a trial with Stade Rennais in 2007. He played two and a half year for Tema Youth and signed in August 2008 for Asante Kotoko.

=== Position ===
He is usually fielded as right winger.

== International career ==
Benson made his debut for Ghana in a friendly against Brazil on March 27, 2008.

== Personal life ==
His half brother is John Mensah.
