= Mavis Ama Frimpong =

Eastern Regional Minister of Ghana

Hon. Mavis Ama Frimpong

Regional Minister
- President: John Dramani Mahama

Deputy Regional Minister

Personal details
- Born: Ghana
- Party: NDC

Mavis Ama Frimpong is a Ghanaian diplomat, development consultant, and former government official who serves as Ghana’s Ambassador to France. She has extensive experience in governance, public health, and international development, with over two decades of service in both political leadership and global development initiatives. She is a politician who held Birim North District Chief Executive position prior to being selected to be the deputy Eastern Regional Minister of Ghana. She was further appointed to the position of Eastern Regional Minister of Ghana during the John Dramani Mahama administration.

== Education ==
Mavis Ama Frimpong holds a Master’s degree in Public Health from the University of Ghana and a Bachelor of Arts degree in Social Sciences from the University of Cape Coast.

== Career ==
=== Political and public service career ===
Frimpong has held several political and administrative positions in Ghana. She served as District Chief Executive for Birim North (2011–2013), Deputy Eastern Regional Minister and the Eastern Regional Minister (2013–2017). During her tenure as regional minister, she oversaw development initiatives including infrastructure expansion, particularly road construction, and promoted policies on gender equity, education, and public health.

She also contributed to national policy development, serving as Chair of the Health Technical Advisory Committee for the National Democratic Congress manifesto (2024) and participating in policy think tanks for earlier national development agendas.

=== International development work ===
Frimpong has worked extensively in international development, particularly in public health. She served as a Maternal, Child, and Reproductive Health Advisor for the Millennium Villages Project in West Africa. In this role, she coordinated multi-country health programs across Ghana, Nigeria, Senegal, and Mali, contributing to improved maternal health outcomes, increased skilled birth deliveries, reduction in infant mortality and the expansion access to family planning services. She also collaborated with international partners, including UN agencies and NGOs, to support healthcare interventions such as fistula repair surgeries in West Africa.

Additionally, she contributed to Ghana’s National HIV/AIDS Strategy and supported USAID-funded health programmes aimed at reducing mother-to-child transmission of HIV.
