= Asankare =

Coordinates: 6°36′N 1°03′W

- Town
- Location within Ghana
- Country: Ghana
- Region: Ashanti Region
- Municipality: Asante Akim South District

Population (2010)(2010)
  - Total: 2,958
  - Ethnicity: Ashanti people
- Time zone: GMT
  - Summer (DST): GMT

Asankare is a town and Electoral Area in the Asante Akim South Municipal of the Ashanti Region of Ghana. Honourable Michael Koomson is the current Assembly Member of Asankare Electoral Area.

Asankare is located off Accra - Kumasi highway. Asankare is about 73 kilometres (45 miles) away from Kumasi, the Ashanti capital

Asankare had a settlement population of 2,958 people in 2010 (Source: Ghana Statistical Service).The people of Asankare are predominantly Akans with Ashanti origin with predominant occupation of farming. More than half of the population is Christian, one - fourth Muslim, and a small segment adheres to the Traditional indigenous religions.

Asankare can boast of six (6) basic schools and one second cycle institution. Three (3) of these schools namely New Central International School, Emmanuel Preparatory School and Faisatu Ahmed Educational Complex are privately owned schools. Asankare M/A JHS, Asankare Presby Primary School and Asankare Emmanuel Methodist School are all public schools. Asankare Technical Institute is the only second cycle institution in the Electoral Area.

The Community has eight suburbs namely: Hiamankyen, Asikafoamantem, Camp, Old Zongo, New Zongo, Attakurom, Quarters and Nkokobuom

Asankare is the home of two Factories at various stages of completion. One is a Fertilizer Factory and the other, a Meat Processing Factory. Mponua Rural Bank Ltd has a branch in Asankare. There is one privately owned Guest house (Sunkwa Guest House) in Asankare. There's also a rest top called Snat.

There is a community based organisation in the town called, Asankare Youth for Development (AYD) that engages young people in volunteer work, communal projects and initiatives aimed at improving education, health and social welfare in the town.

The Paramount Chief of Asankare owes allegiance to the Ashanti Kingdom. Nana Okoforobour Kwakye Dopoah III is the Omanhene (Paramount Chief) of Asankare Traditional Area and Nana Abena Kyerewaa I is the Omanhemaa (Queen Mother).
