= Akro Senior High Technical School =

Public school in Eastern Region, Ghana

Coordinates: 6.14621°N 0.00266°E

- Odumase Krobo, Eastern Region; Ghana

Information
- Type: secondary/high school, Technical
- Established: 1991 (35 years ago)
- Grades: Forms [1-3]
- Nickname: ASHTECH

Akro Senior High Technical School (also known as ASHTECH) is a public school located in the Odumase-Krobo in the Lower Manya Krobo Municipality in the Eastern region of Ghana.

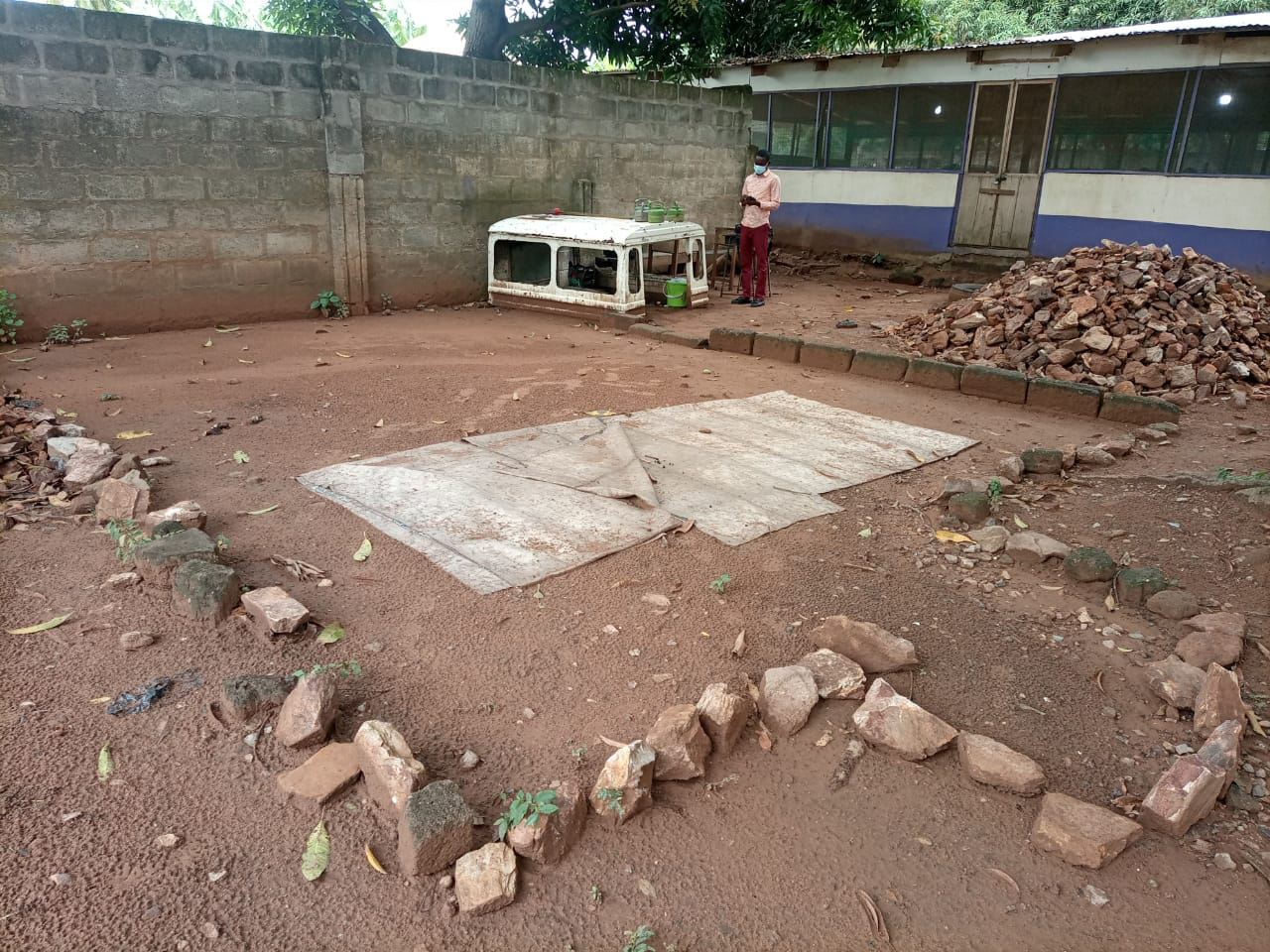
Praying place for Muslim students in the school

== Notable alumni ==
1. Benjamin Narh-Madey - PhD Genetics Candidate, University of Wisconsin-Madison
