= Alexander Akwasi Acquah =

Ghanaian politician

Hon. Alexander Akwasi Acquah
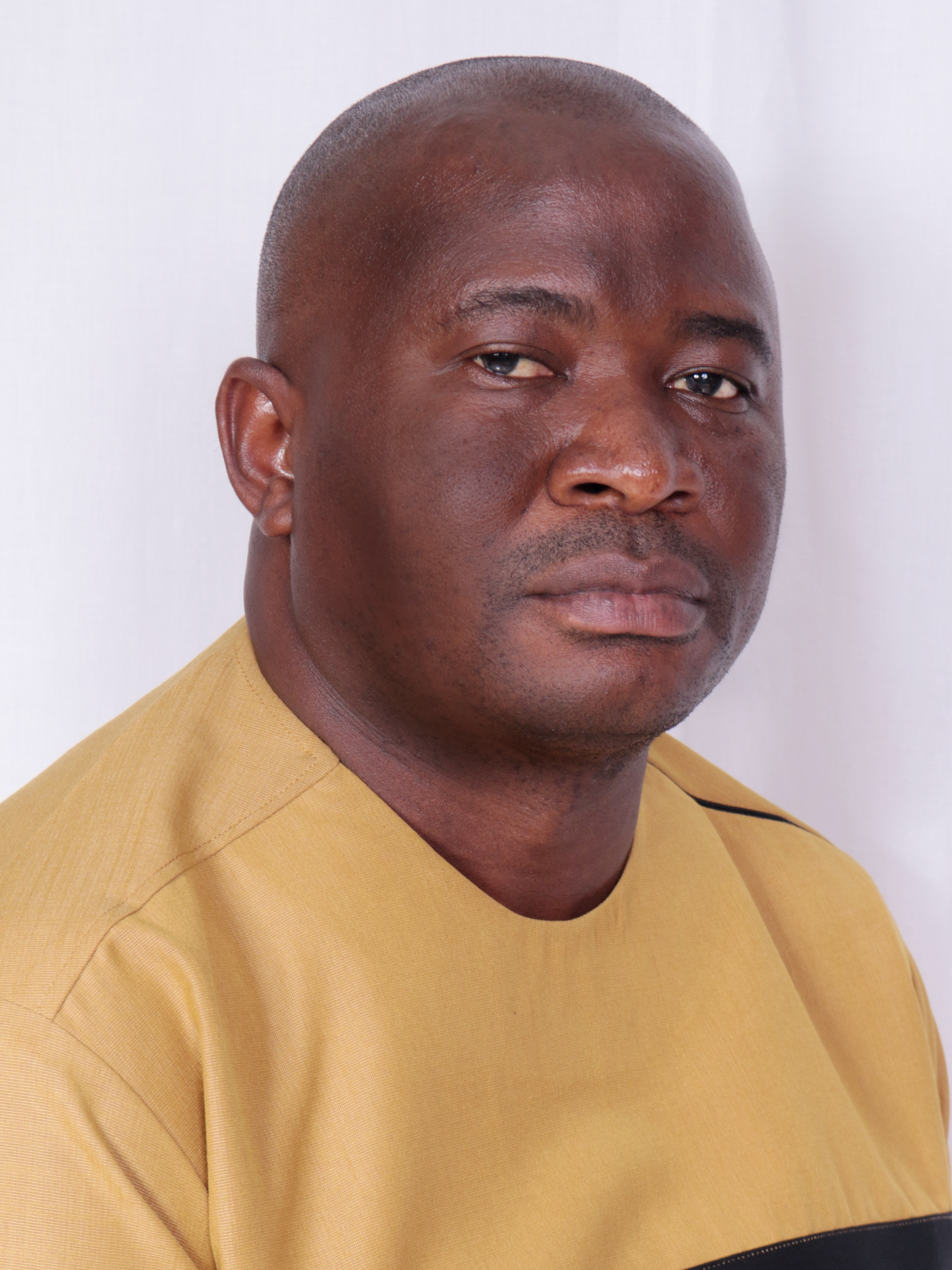

Member of Parliament for Akim Oda
- Incumbent
- Assumed office 7 January 2021
- Preceded by: William Quaitoo

Personal details
- Born: Alexander Akwasi Acquah; 8 December 1974 (age 51) Akim Oda, Ghana
- Party: New Patriotic Party
- Occupation: Politician
- Committees: Trade, Industry and Tourism Committee Government Assurance Committee Health Committee

Alexander Akwasi Acquah (born Sunday 8 December 1974) is a Ghanaian politician who is a member of the New Patriotic Party and a member of parliament for the Akim Oda constituency in the Eastern Region of Ghana. He hails from Akim Oda and a christian by religion.

== Early life and education ==
Akwasi was born on 8 December 1974 and hails from Akim Oda. He acquired his O'level in the year 1991 and GCE A' level in 1993. He holds Masters Degree in Peace and Security in 2020. He also had his Diploma in Political Reporting in 2000.

== Career ==
Akwasi was the chief executive officer of the Community Hospitals Group. He is an entrepreneur and a business analyst. He worked with the National Health Insurance Scheme as it public relation Officer.

== Politics ==
Akwasi is a member of the New Patriotic Party. He is currently the Member of Parliament for Akim Oda Constituency in the Eastern Region of Ghana.

=== 2020 election ===
In the 2020 Ghanaian general elections, he won the parliament seat with 25,380 votes making 79.45% of the total votes cast whilst the NDC parliamentary candidate Jones Asante had 6,262 votes making 19.60% of the total votes cast and the GUM parliamentary candidate Madam Lucy Ansah had 301 making 0.94% of the total votes cast.

=== Committees ===
Akwasi is the Vice Chairperson of the Trade, Industry and Tourism Committee; a member of the Government Assurance Committee and also a member of Health Committee.

== Philanthropy ==
In April 2022, he gave pieces of GTP wax prints to about 180 elderly men and women in his constituency during the Easter celebrations.

In October 2022, he presented medical equipment to four health facilities in the Akim Oda Constituency.

In November 2022, he presented 100,000 cedis to aid in the renovation of the Akyem Oda Municipal park. He also donated mathematical sets to JHS students in his constituency.

In January 2023, he honored 31 workers and 17 'professionals' in the Akim Oda Constituency.

== Personal life ==
Akwasi is a Christian. He is married to Henrietta Acquah and their marriage has produced four sons, Kevin Acquah, Alvin Acquah, Marvin Acquah and Shiloh Acquah
