= Akim Swedru =

Town in Eastern Region, Ghana

- Town
- Location of Akim Swedru in Eastern Region, Ghana
- Coordinates: 05°53′38.24″N 01°00′45.6″W
- Country: Ghana
- Region: Eastern Region
- District: Birim South District
- Elevation: 116 m (381 ft)

Population (2013)
  - Total: 10,379
- Time zone: GMT
  - Summer (DST): GMT

Akim Swedru is a town and the capital of Birim South District, a district in the Eastern Region of south Ghana.

== People ==
According to the Diocese of Koforidua, Akim Swedru was founded by a group that migrated from Kokofu led by Nana Koragye Ampaw.

The people of Akim Swedru belong to the Akyem people. They are one of the groups which make up the Akan people in Ghana.

== Location ==
To the northwest of Swedru is Aduasa. To the north is a village called Jedem and spanning from northeast to the east is Akim Oda. Other towns and villages to the east are Ewisa, Akim Asawaase, Ntutumerim, Anyinam, Aboabo, Asene, Batabe, Manso, Asuboa and Anamasi. To the south are Akyease and Aperade.
