= Kwaebibirem Municipal District =

Municipal District in Eastern Region, Ghana

- Municipal District
- Seal

- Districts of Eastern Region

- Location of Kwaebibirem Municipal District within Eastern
- Coordinates: 6°13′N 0°54′W
- Country: Ghana
- Region: Eastern
- Capital: Kade

Government
  - Municipal Chief Executive: Yaw Yiadom Boakye

Area
  - Total: 1,147 km^{2} (443 sq mi)

Population (2021)
  - Total: 121,698
- Time zone: UTC+0 (GMT)

Kwaebibirem Municipal District is one of the thirty-three districts in Eastern Region, Ghana. Originally created as an ordinary district assembly in 1988 when it was known as Kwaebibirem District, which was created from the former West Akim District Council. However on 6 February 2012 (effectively 28 June 2012), the southern part of the district was split off to create Denkyembour District; thus the remaining part has been retained as Kwaebibirem District. Later, it was elevated to municipal district assembly status on 15 March 2018 to become 'Kwaebibirem Municipal District. The municipality is located in the southern part of Eastern Region and has Kade as its capital town.

== List of settlements ==
Settlements of Kwaebibirem Municipal District
No.	Settlement	Population	Population year
1	Akim-Wenchi		
2	Apinamang		
3	Anweaso		
4	Asempanaye		
5	Afreseni – Camp		
6	Afreseni		
7	Aworokrom		
8	Asibey-Nkwanta		
9	Akwatia	23,766	2013
10	Asibeykrom		
11	Amakom		
12	Asuokor		
13	Attakrom		
14	Aponaponso		
15	Adugyama		
16	Kade	16,542	2013
17	Kumawu		
18	Bonkrom		
19	Nyehwee		
20	Kunsu		
21	Abodum		

== Sources ==
- "Kwaebibirem Municipal District". Statoids.
- District: Kwaebibirem Municipal District
