= New Abirem =

New Abirem Aberem
- Town
- Birim North District logo

- Location of New Abirem in Eastern Region, Ghana
- Coordinates: 6°18′N 0°59′W
- Country: Ghana
- Region: Eastern Region
- District: Birim North District
- Elevation: 512 ft (156 m)
- Time zone: GMT
  - Summer (DST): GMT

New Abirem is a small town in south Ghana and the capital of the Birim North District, a district in the Eastern Region of south Ghana. A curiosity is that this remote town hosts a modern resort called Beige Village Golf Resort and Spa, where locals, tourists and especially expats can be entertained by various activities such as golf and spa treats. The resort is well known in the country for organising Junior Golf competitions.

The mining giant, Newmont Golden Ridge Ltd had its Akyem mines in the District and operated in the District since 2011. The operations of the mine is largely credited for the rapid expansion and development of the District, especially the capital. In 2024, Newmont sold the mine to Zijin Mining for up to $1 billion in cash.
