= Birim District =

- Former District Council
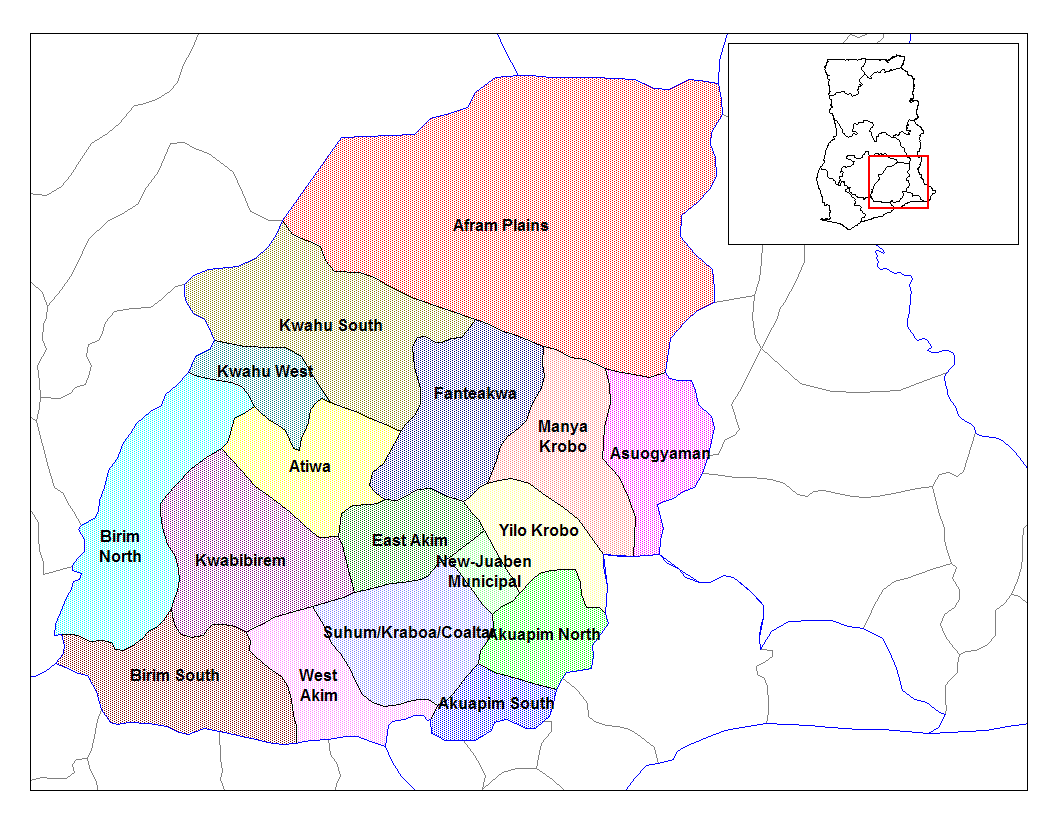
- Districts of Eastern Region

- Location of Birim District within Eastern
- Coordinates: 5°55′29.89″N 0°58′55.78″W
- Country: Ghana
- Region: Eastern
- Capital: Akim Oda
- Time zone: UTC+0 (GMT)

Birim District is a former district council that was located in Eastern Region, Ghana. Originally created as an ordinary district assembly in 1975. However, on 10 March 1989, it was split off into two new district assemblies: Birim South District (capital: Akim Oda) and Birim North District (capital: New Abirem). The district assembly was located in the southwest part of Eastern Region and had Akim Oda as its capital town.
