= Denkyembour =

District in the Eastern Region of Ghana

Denkyembour District
- District
- Districts of Eastern Region

- Location of Denkyembour District within Eastern
- Coordinates: 6°3′N 0°48′W
- Country: Ghana
- Region: Eastern
- Capital: Akwatia

Population (2021)
  - Total: 77,029
- Time zone: UTC+0 (GMT)

Denkyembour District is one of the thirty-three districts in Eastern Region, Ghana. Originally it was formerly part of the then-larger Kwaebibirem District in 1988, which was created from the former West Akim District Council. However, on 6 February 2012 (effectively 28 June 2012), the southern part of the district was split off to create Denkyembour District; thus the remaining part has been retained as Kwaebibirem District, which it was elevated to municipal district assembly status on 15 March 2018 to become Kwaebibirem Municipal District. The district assembly is located in the southern part of Eastern Region and has Akwatia as its capital town.

== Localities ==
- Akwatia
- Topremang
- Dwenase
- Apinamang
- Boadua
- Sekyikrom
