= Kade, Ghana =

Kade
- Town
- Location of Kade in Eastern Region, Ghana Kade (Africa)
- Coordinates: 06°05′N 00°50′W
- Country: Ghana
- Region: Eastern Region
- Municipal: Kwaebibirem Municipality
- Elevation: 131 m (430 ft)

Population (2013)
  - Total: 16,542
- Time zone: GMT
  - Summer (DST): GMT

Kade is a town and the capital of Kwaebibirem Municipal, a district in the Eastern Region of south Ghana. Kade has a 2013 settlement population of 16,542 people.

== Geography ==
Kade is the location of an important placer mine, Kade is located 120 km from Accra.

== Transport. ==
=== Train ===
Kade is the terminus of a Ghana railway branch off the central line, built to serve the Kade mine.

== Sports ==
The football team Kade United F/C is based in this town Kade.

== Education ==
Kade Senior High School is secondary school located in Kade.

== See also ==
- Railway stations in Ghana
