= Shai Hills Resource Reserve =

Protected area in Doryumu, Ghana

- IUCN category VI (protected area with sustainable use of natural resources)
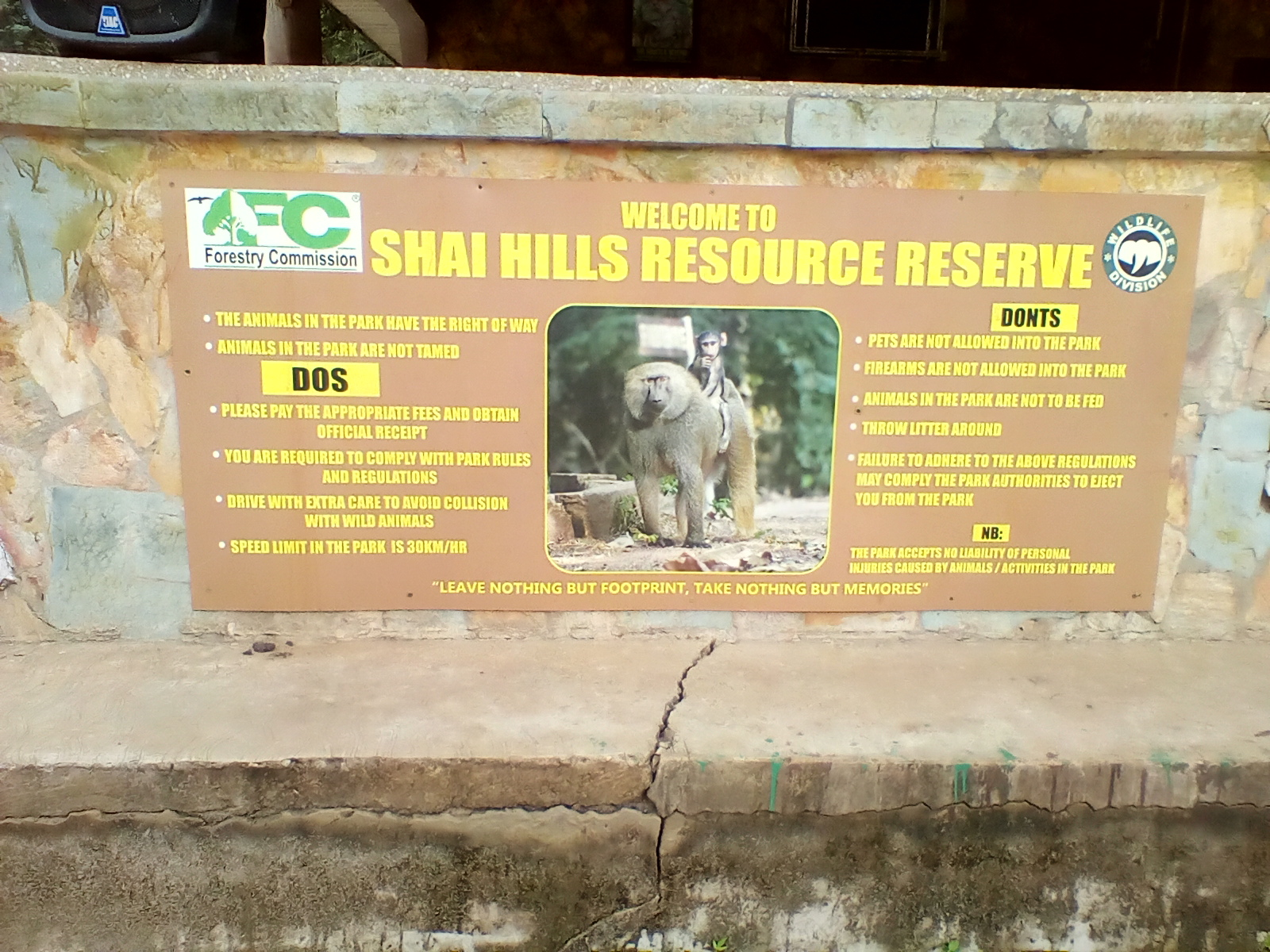
- Sign post of the Shai Hills Resource Reserve

- Location within Ghana
- Location: Doryumu, Greater Accra Region, Ghana
- Nearest city: Accra
- Coordinates: 5.9094°N 0.0653°E
- Area: 51 km^{2} (5,100 ha; 20 sq mi)
- Established: 1962

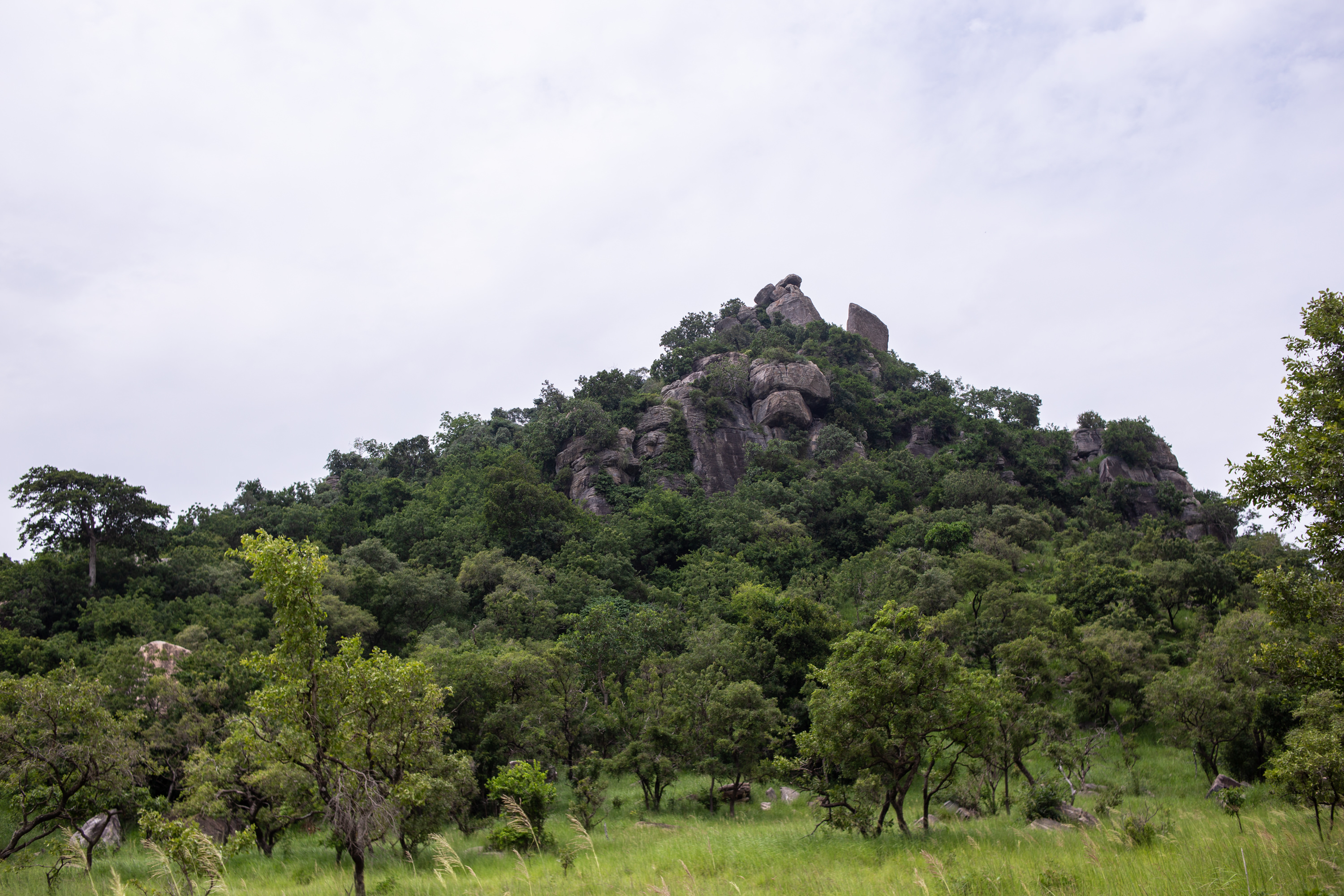
Shai Hills

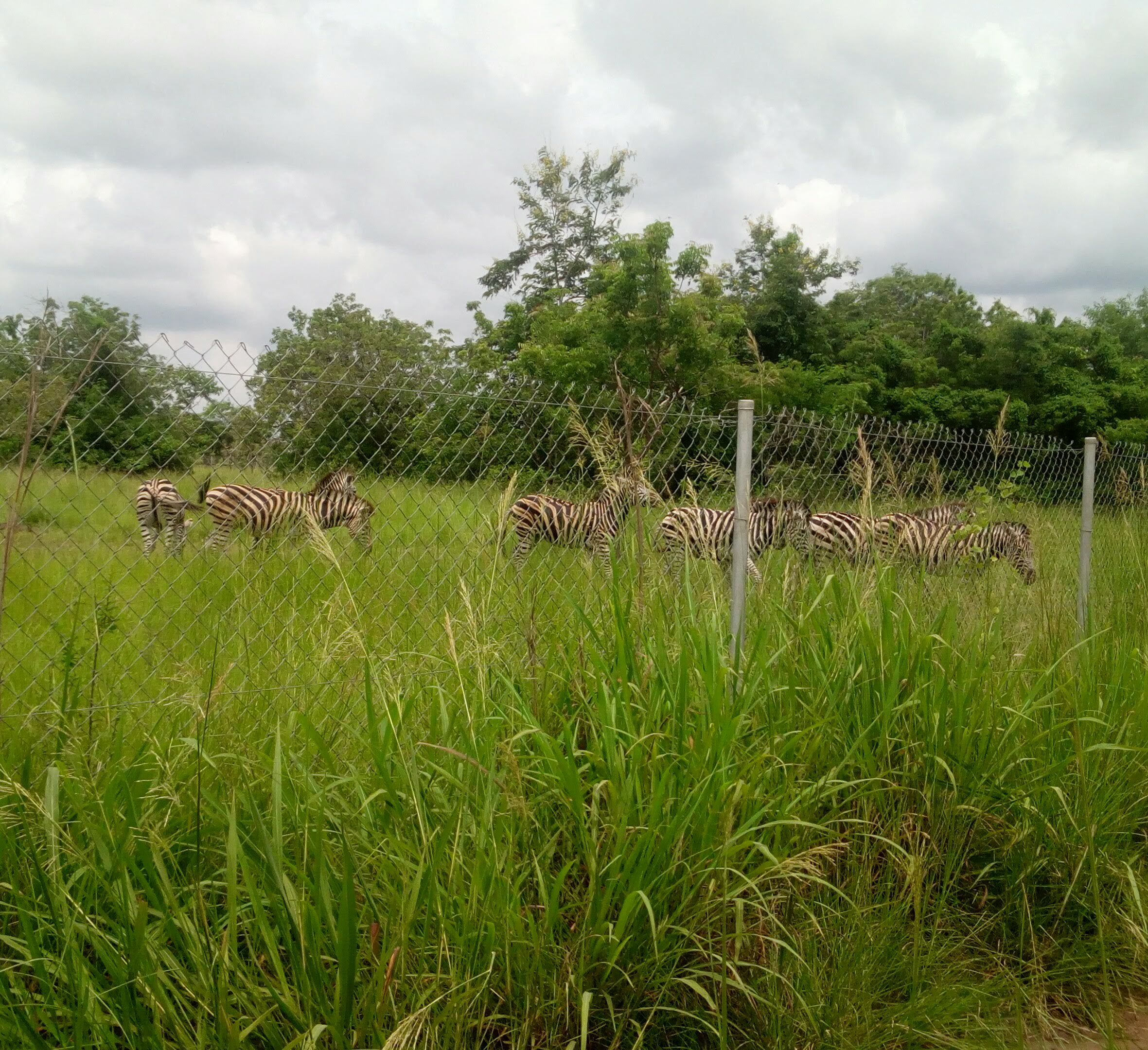
Zebra at the Shai Hills Reserve

Shai Hills Resource Reserve is a resource reserve located in Doryumu in the Shai Osudoku District all in the Greater Accra Region of southern Ghana. It lies along the Tema-Akosombo Highway some 57 km from Accra.

== History ==
The protected area was home to the Shai people before they were ejected by the British in 1892. Remains of Shai people's works can still be found in the reserve.

The reserve was established in 1962 with area of 47 km^{2} (18 sq mi) which was later extended to 51 km^{2} (20 sq mi) in 1973. It was made a Game Production Reserve in 1971.

== Environment ==
The Shai Hills Resource Reserve is covered with grassland and low dry forest vegetation. There are nearly 400 plant species spread on the five separate hills at the Shai Hills Resource Reserve.

=== Wildlife ===
There are numerous animals. Bird species include violet turaco, paradise flycatcher, green turaco, red-billed hornbill, yellow-fronted tinkerbird, guineafowl and red-necked buzzard.The reserve has been designated an Important Bird Area (IBA) by BirdLife International because it supports significant populations of many bird species.

Other animals present include antelopes, bats, baboons, cats, duiker, kobs, green monkeys, monitor lizards, African python, royal python and zebras. Zebras are not native to Ghana, and the ones in the reserve are imports from South Africa. Guides employed at the reserve reported (in September 2024) that five zebras had been born to date in the park, and some of those now live in Ghanaian zoos.

=== Access ===
Visitors can visit the attractive region of hilly rocks and grassy plains in the reserve all year round. Touring the reserve during the early rainy season (May through July) could be difficult because of rough road conditions. Popular activities include game viewing, bird watching, nature walking, and rock-climbing.

=== Threats ===
The reserve is bedeviled with a lot of threats such as danger from speeding vehicles because some of the baboons find their way to the highway. The reserve is also situated close to a stone quarry and this also affects the day-to-day activities of the park.

== Recreation ==
The area is of the best tourism hubs in Ghana. It has been a host to recreational activities such as Picnics, and in 2017 hosted the National Biking & Abseil Festival.

=== Events ===
Events held at Shai Hills resource reserve has been home to these events:

S/N	Name	Year	Ref
1	WildaLand Festival	2021, 2022	
2	The Inter Tourism Expo Accra	2021	
