= Ofoase =

- Town
- Location of Ofoase in Ashanti Region, Ghana
- Coordinates: 6°10′N 1°9′W
- Country: Ghana
- Region: Ashanti Region
- District: Asante Akim South Municipal District
- Elevation: 440 ft (134 m)
- Time zone: GMT
  - Summer (DST): GMT

Ofoase is a small town in the Ashanti Akim South Municipal, with Juaso being the capital in the Ashanti, Ghana.

== Education ==
- Ofoase Senior High Technical School

The school is a second cycle institution.
