= Abirem (Ghana parliament constituency) =

Constituency in the Eastern Region, Ghana

- constituency for the Parliament of Ghana
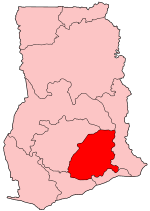
- District: Birim North District
- Region: Eastern Region of Ghana

Current constituency
- Party: New Patriotic Party
- MP: Charles Asuako Owiredu

Charles Asuako Owiredu is the current member of parliament for the constituency. He was elected on the ticket of the New Patriotic Party (NPP) and won a majority of 18,008 votes. He represents the constituency in the Ninth Parliament of the fourth republic.

== See also ==
- List of Ghana Parliament constituencies
