= Asante Akim South Municipal District =

- Municipal District
- Districts of Ashanti Region

- Location of Asante Akim South Municipal District within Ashanti
- Coordinates: 6°34′N 1°7′W
- Country: Ghana
- Region: Ashanti
- Capital: Juaso

Government
  - Municipal Chief Executive: Mr. Alexander Frimpong

Area
  - Total: 1,275 km^{2} (492 sq mi)

Population (2021)
  - Total: 123,633
  - Density: 96.97/km^{2} (251.1/sq mi)
- Time zone: UTC+0 (GMT)

Asante Akim South Municipal District is one of the forty-three districts in Ashanti Region, Ghana. Originally created as an ordinary district assembly in 1988 as Asante Akim South District, which it was created from the former Asante Akim District Council. Later it was elevated to municipal district assembly status on 15 March 2018. The municipality is located in the eastern part of Ashanti Region and has Juaso as its capital town.

== Settlements ==
- Juaso (capital)
- Ofoase
- Obogu
- Pra-River
- Morso
- Komeso
- Dampong
- Asuboa
- Dwendwenase
- Wenkyi
- Nnadieso
- Asuboa
- Dampong
- Breku
- Adansi
- Atwedie
- Banso
- Banso-Asuboi
- Banka
- Bankame
- Yawkwei
- Kyempo
- Odubi
- Nkwanta
- Atiemo
- Tokwai
- Tokwai-Asuboi
- Bompata
- Asankare
- Kadjo Formanso
- Takyikrom

== Sources ==
- "Districts of Ghana". Statoids.
- GhanaDistricts.com
