= Akwatia =

- Town
- Nickname: diamond city
- Location of Akwatia in Eastern Region
- Coordinates: 06°03′00″N 00°48′00″W
- Country: Ghana
- Region: Eastern Region
- District: Denkyembour
- Elevation: 482 ft (147 m)

Population (2013)
  - Total: 23,766
- Time zone: GMT
  - Summer (DST): GMT

Akwatia is the capital of Denkyembour, a district in the Eastern region of south Ghana and west of the Atewa Range in the Birim River basin. Akwatia or Akortia also means "He returned here or there" In the indigenous language formerly known as Oji-Ounji now called Anii. Akwatia has a 2013 settlement population of 23,766 people. Akwatia is the main center of diamond extraction in Ghana. The town is the center of the Denkyembour parliamentary constituency.

== Facilities ==
=== Education ===
- St. Rose's´High School
- Akwatia Technical Institute

=== Sports ===
Among the athletes hailing from this town are: Kabiru Moro, Ekow Benson, Emmanuel Boateng, Oppong Enoch Opare among others. Among the notable football clubs are the Akwatia Diamond Stars, Diamond Academy, Akwatia Vidaco Football Club, Akwatia Frankfurt Football Academy, Young Diamonds and Deelorm Academy

=== Healthcare ===
Akwatia has two hospitals, Saint Dominic's Hospital and The Ghanaian Consolidated Diamonds Company Hospital (G.C.D Hospital). The Saint Dominic's Hospital in Akwatia is a 320-bed facility, and the hospital opened an Eye Clinic since 2003.

== Diamond mining ==
The Akwatia diamond field lies in Birimian rocks and has produced over 100,000,000 carats (20,000 kg) of diamonds, mostly industrial grade. The Ghana government-owned Ghana Consolidated Diamonds (GCD) is the only formal commercial producer of diamonds, using strip mining with Manitowoc draglines. Large additional resources of diamonds have been identified in the nearby Birim River deposits, including an altered meta-lamproite that may represent a primary diamond source.
