= Juaso =

- District capital
- Location in Ghana
- Coordinates: 6°36′N 1°8′W
- Country: Ghana
- Region: Ashanti Region
- District: Asante Akim South District

Juaso is a town and is the capital of Asante Akim South, a district in the Ashanti Region of Ghana.

== Transport ==
The town is served by a station on the central line of Ghana Railway Corporation.

== See also ==
- Railway stations in Ghana
