= Achiase =

Achiasi Akim Achiase
- Town
- Location of Achiasi in Eastern Region
- Coordinates: 5°50′N 1°00′W
- Country: Ghana
- Region: Eastern Region
- Achiase District: Achiase District
- Elevation: 551 ft (168 m)

Population
  - Ethnicity: Akan people
  - Demonym: Achiasian
- Time zone: GMT
  - Summer (DST): GMT
- Website: http://www.ghana.gov.gh/index.php/media-center/regional-news/5418-newly-created-achiase-district-inaugurated

Achiase is a town which doubles as the district capital of Achiase District which was carved out of the Birim South District in February 2019 in the Eastern Region of Ghana. Achiase is also referred to as Akim Achiase, Akyem Achiase or Akyem Akyease and officially, most documents refer to this town as Akim-Achiase. On Google maps, it is listed as Akyease. The Chief of Achiase (Achiasehene) is the 2nd In command of the Ninfa Division of the Akyem Abuakwa Traditional Area. The Achiasehene, Daasebre Gyenin Kantan II, plays a critical role traditionally labeled Takwa which translates as Military Intelligence Unit and thus, his title is Takwahene in the Abuakwa Traditional Area which literally means Intelligence Chief. Achiase also houses a Military Jungle Warfare Training School for the Ghana Military named Seth Anthony Barracks. This military school also offers strategic training to corporate organisations which seek its services. Over the years, multinationals like MTN are among the corporate bodies who have been trained at this facility.
