= Nkawkaw (Ghana parliament constituency) =

Ghana parliament constituency

- constituency for the Parliament of Ghana
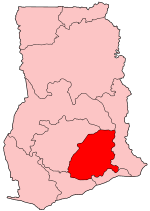
- District: Kwahu West Municipal District
- Region: Eastern Region of Ghana

Current constituency
- Party: New Patriotic Party
- MP: Joseph Frempong

The Nkawkaw constituency is in the Eastern region of Ghana. The current member of Parliament for the constituency is Joseph Frempong. He was elected on the ticket of the New Patriotic Party in the 2024 General election to win the constituency election to become the MP. He succeeded Kwakye Darfour who had represented the constituency in the 4th Republican parliament on the ticket as an Independent candidate.

== See also ==
- List of Ghana Parliament constituencies
