= Afram Plains South (Ghana parliament constituency) =

Ghana parliament constituency

- constituency for the Parliament of Ghana
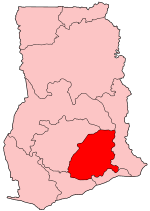
- District: Kwahu North District
- Region: Eastern Region of Ghana

Current constituency
- Party: National Democratic Congress
- MP: Hon Joseph Appiah-Boateng

The Afram Plains South constituency is in the Eastern region of Ghana. The current member of Parliament for the constituency is Hon. Eric Osei Owusu He was elected on the ticket of the National Democratic Congress and won a majority of 11,186 votes representing 53.57%, to win the constituency election to become the MP. He was the CEO of National Food Buffer Stock Company, 2010–2016.

== See also ==
- List of Ghana Parliament constituencies
