= Birim North District =

- District
- Seal

- Districts of Eastern Region

- Location of Birim North District within Eastern
- Coordinates: 6°18′N 0°59′W
- Country: Ghana
- Region: Eastern
- Capital: New Abirem

Government
  - District Executive: Mavis Ama Frimpong

Area
  - Total: 566.5 km^{2} (218.7 sq mi)

Population (2021)
  - Total: 82,669
  - Density: 145.9/km^{2} (378.0/sq mi)
- Time zone: UTC+0 (GMT)
- Website: Official Website

Birim North District is one of the thirty-three districts in Eastern Region, Ghana. Originally created as an ordinary district assembly in 1988, which was created from the former Birim District Council, until the southern part of the district was split off to create Akyemansa District on 29 February 2008; thus the remaining part has been retained as Birim North District. The district assembly is located in the southwest part of Eastern Region and has New Abirem as its capital town.

== Geography ==
The Birim River flows through the Birim North District, an important source of diamonds. Newmont Ghana partnered with COCOBOD to repair the Nkawkaw-Noyem to New Abirem cocoa road. The project was part of the government's 2020 "Year of Roads Agenda". The road improves transportation for people and farm produce, and makes it easier for farmers to transport their cocoa beans to buying centers.

== List of settlements ==
Settlements of Birim North District
No.	Settlement	Population	Population year
1	Abenase		
2	Adjobue		
3	Adubiase		
4	Adwafo		
5	Afosu		
6	Akoase		
7	Akokoaseo		
8	Amuana Praso		
9	Anyinase		
10	Ayirebi		
11	Brenase		
12	Chia		
13	Kotokuom		
14	Mamanso		
15	New Abirem		
16	Nkwa Teng		
17	Ntronang		
18	Ofoasekese		
19	Otchereso		
20	Pankese		
