= Akim Oda =

Town in Eastern Region of Ghana

Akim Oda Akyem Oda
- Town
- Birim Central Municipal District logo

- Location of Akim Oda in Eastern Region, Ghana
- Coordinates: 05°55′25″N 00°59′18″W
- Country: Ghana
- Region: Eastern Region
- District: Birim Central Municipal

Population (2013)
  - Total: 60,604
- Time zone: GMT
  - Summer (DST): GMT

Akim Oda is a town in Ghana's Eastern Region, serving as the administrative and traditional center of the Birim Central Municipal District and Akyem Kotoku, respectively. The town has 60,604 residents as of 2013.

== Geography and climate ==
Akim Oda is a town in the south of Ghana, surrounded by rain forests. It is located in the basin of the Birim River, which is rich in gold and diamonds. Akim Oda is the capital of the Birim Central Municipal District and has a population of about 60,000 people.

The climate of Akim Oda is semi-equatorial and wet, with significant precipitation during the rainy season from April to June and again from September to November. A dry season is experienced between December and February. During this period, temperatures are also significantly colder.

Climate data for Akim Oda (1991–2020)
Month	Jan	Feb	Mar	Apr	May	Jun	Jul	Aug	Sep	Oct	Nov	Dec	Year
Record high °C (°F)	36.6 (97.9)	38.7 (101.7)	38.0 (100.4)	36.7 (98.1)	35.6 (96.1)	34.1 (93.4)	33.2 (91.8)	33.4 (92.1)	33.7 (92.7)	35.4 (95.7)	34.9 (94.8)	34.8 (94.6)	38.7 (101.7)
Mean daily maximum °C (°F)	32.3 (90.1)	34.6 (94.3)	34.2 (93.6)	33.4 (92.1)	32.5 (90.5)	30.7 (87.3)	29.4 (84.9)	29.0 (84.2)	30.4 (86.7)	31.8 (89.2)	32.6 (90.7)	32.2 (90.0)	31.9 (89.4)
Daily mean °C (°F)	26.9 (80.4)	28.8 (83.8)	28.7 (83.7)	28.3 (82.9)	27.8 (82.0)	26.8 (80.2)	25.9 (78.6)	25.6 (78.1)	26.5 (79.7)	27.2 (81.0)	27.5 (81.5)	27.3 (81.1)	27.3 (81.1)
Mean daily minimum °C (°F)	21.4 (70.5)	23.0 (73.4)	23.2 (73.8)	23.2 (73.8)	23.2 (73.8)	22.9 (73.2)	22.4 (72.3)	22.2 (72.0)	22.6 (72.7)	22.6 (72.7)	22.5 (72.5)	22.4 (72.3)	22.6 (72.7)
Record low °C (°F)	13.8 (56.8)	15.2 (59.4)	16.5 (61.7)	18.5 (65.3)	17.4 (63.3)	20.0 (68.0)	19.0 (66.2)	18.8 (65.8)	20.0 (68.0)	18.5 (65.3)	19.0 (66.2)	13.8 (56.8)	13.8 (56.8)
Average precipitation mm (inches)	23.5 (0.93)	57.2 (2.25)	119.1 (4.69)	140.3 (5.52)	164.1 (6.46)	209.6 (8.25)	133.2 (5.24)	72.2 (2.84)	122.5 (4.82)	201.8 (7.94)	130.1 (5.12)	40.2 (1.58)	1,413.8 (55.66)
Average precipitation days (≥ 1.0 mm)	1.8	3.9	8.8	9.1	11.9	13.4	9.8	8.1	11.8	14.8	11.1	3.8	108.3
Source: NOAA

== Economy ==
=== Agriculture ===
Akim Oda's economy relies heavily on cocoa, which is grown both on formal and informal plantations, sometimes along the roads. Harvested beans are dried and stored in warehouses until they are ready to be shipped.

The Birim River's northern region hosts a number of palm oil plantations, occupying an area of roughly 6,000 hectares. These plantations are mostly small-scale and independently owned.

The production of palm oil generates various byproducts that can be utilized for other purposes. One of these byproducts is palm kernel cake which is rich in fatty acids and can be used as a raw material for soap-making. Another crop cultivated in Akim Oda is bamboo, which has multiple applications in different sectors. Bamboo can be processed into furniture, flooring, paper, and even building materials, making it a versatile and sustainable resource.

=== Mining ===
The Birim river, which flows through the town of Akim Oda, is a source of valuable minerals such as gold and diamonds. Local miners use traditional methods to extract these resources from the river bank, often with simple tools and equipment.

=== Forestry ===
The forests near Akim Oda are home to many precious trees, but they are also exploited for timber. Ghana's forest cover has shrunk from 8.2 million hectares in 1900 to 1.6 million hectares in 2000 and is still decreasing rapidly due to the high demand for exports and construction from the growing Ghanaian economy. To counter this trend, forest plantations are being established near Akim Oda (and across the country) under the National Forest Plantation Development Program.

=== Tourism ===
Akim Oda offers visitors a variety of experiences, from exploring the mining operations on dug-out boats to witnessing traditional ceremonies with Akan drumming to admiring the largest tree in West Africa. The tree measures 12 meters in circumference and 66.5 meters in height. The outdoor market is also a lively place to sample Ghanaian food and interact with the locals.

== Healthcare ==
Akim Oda Government Hospital serves the Kotoku traditional area and also acts as a referral point for nearby communities in the Akyem states. There are also other major private clinics in the town, such as the Jubilee Hospital and Oda Community Hospital. They provide health care to the people of Akyem Kotoku, Bosome, and part of the Abuakwa traditional area.

== Education ==
Several educational institutions, both public and private, operate in the Kotoku traditional area. The public sector has more than fifteen primary and junior high schools and three major senior high schools. The private sector has over 20 competitive schools.

== Notable people ==
Notable people born in Akim Oda include:

- Kuami Eugene, a Ghanaian musician
- Alexander Akwasi Acquah, politician
- Benjamin Azamati-Kwaku, a Ghanaian sprinter
- Frederick Asare Bekoe, Chief of Air Staff
- Ursula Owusu, a Ghanaian lawyer and politician
- Benny Morgan, a Ghanaian musician
- Emmanuel Oti Essigba, a Ghanaian footballer
- Justice Joe Appiah, a politician

== Media coverage ==
The Akyem states and the nation benefit from four major radio stations in Akim Oda. These stations influence social, economic and political issues with their broadcasts.

== See also ==
- Akim Oda Constituency
