= Eastern Region (Ghana) =

Region of Ghana

Coordinates: 6°30′N 0°30′W

- Region
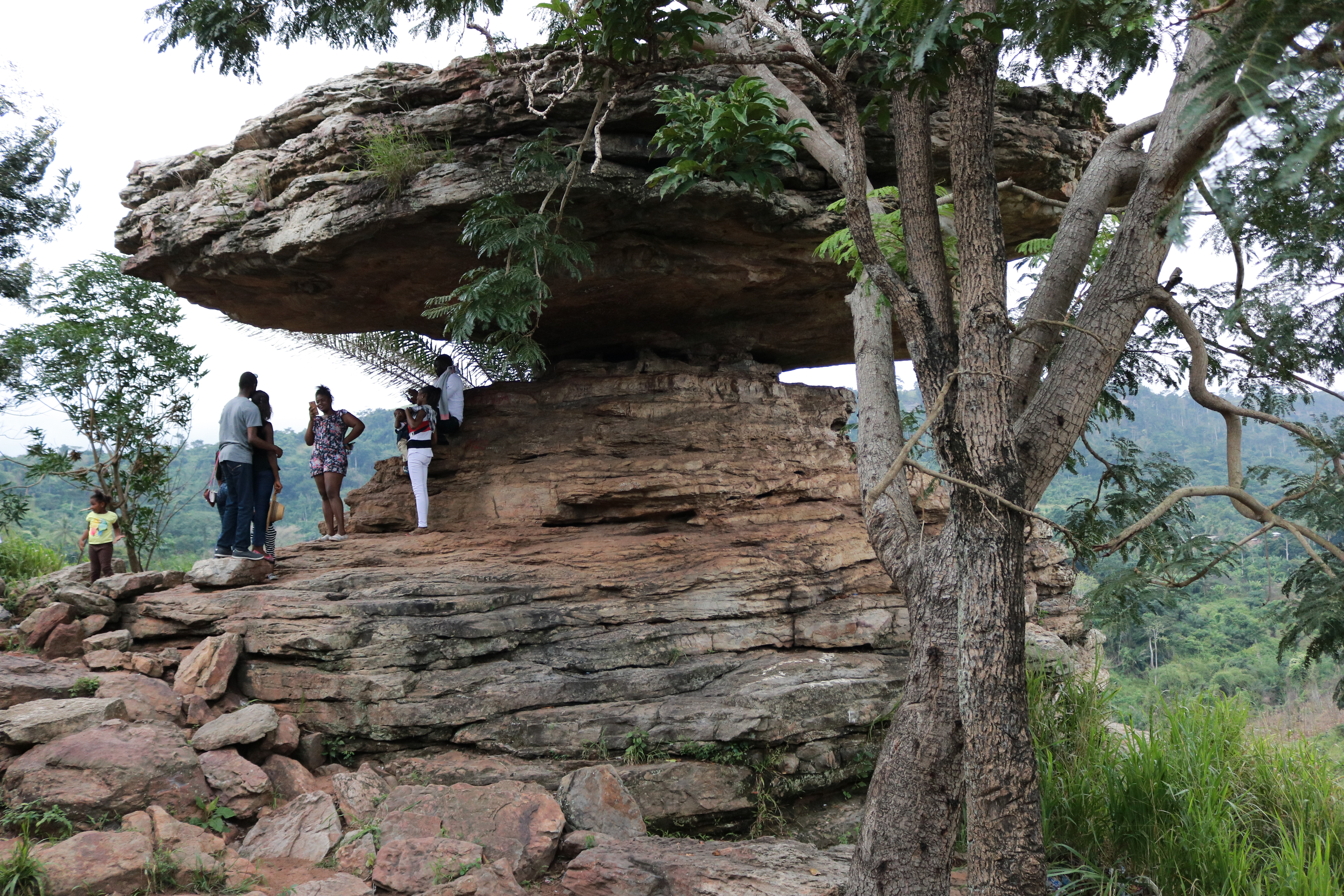
- Tourists enjoying themselves at Umbrella Rock

- Location of Eastern Region in Ghana
- Country: Ghana
- Capital: Koforidua
- Districts: 26

Government
  - Regional Minister: Rita Akosua Adjei Away

Area
  - Total: 19,323 km^{2} (7,461 sq mi)
  - Rank: Ranked 6th

Population (2021 Census)
  - Total: 2,925,653
  - Rank: Ranked 3rd
  - Density: 151.41/km^{2} (392.14/sq mi)

GDP (PPP)
  - Year: 2013
  - Per capita: $5,150

GDP (Nominal)
  - Year: 2013
  - Per capita: $2,500
- Time zone: GMT
- Area code: 034
- ISO 3166 code: GH-EP
- HDI (2022): 0.649 medium · 2nd

The Eastern Region is located in the eastern part of Ghana and is one of the sixteen administrative regions of Ghana. Eastern Region is bordered to the east by the Lake Volta, to the north by Bono East Region and Ashanti region, to the west by Ashanti Region, to the south by Central Region and Greater Accra Region. Akans are the dominant inhabitants and natives of Eastern Region, and Akan, Ewe, Krobo, Hausa and English are the main spoken languages. The capital town of Eastern Region is Koforidua. The Eastern Region is the location of the Akosombo Dam, and the economy of the Eastern Region is dominated by its high-capacity electricity generation. Eastern Region covers an area of 19,323 square kilometres, which is about 8.1% of Ghana's total landform.

== Hydro project ==
High-capacity electricity generation Akosombo Hydroelectric Project contains three main tributaries: the Black Volta; the White Volta and the Red Volta and the Akosombo Hydroelectric Project flows into the Gulf of Guinea on the Atlantic Ocean. The Akosombo Dam was completed in 1965 as part of the Volta River Project. The dam measures at 440 ft (134 m) above ground level. The large electric power generating capacity is 912 megawatts. The dam helps supply electricity to an economically important town called Tema.

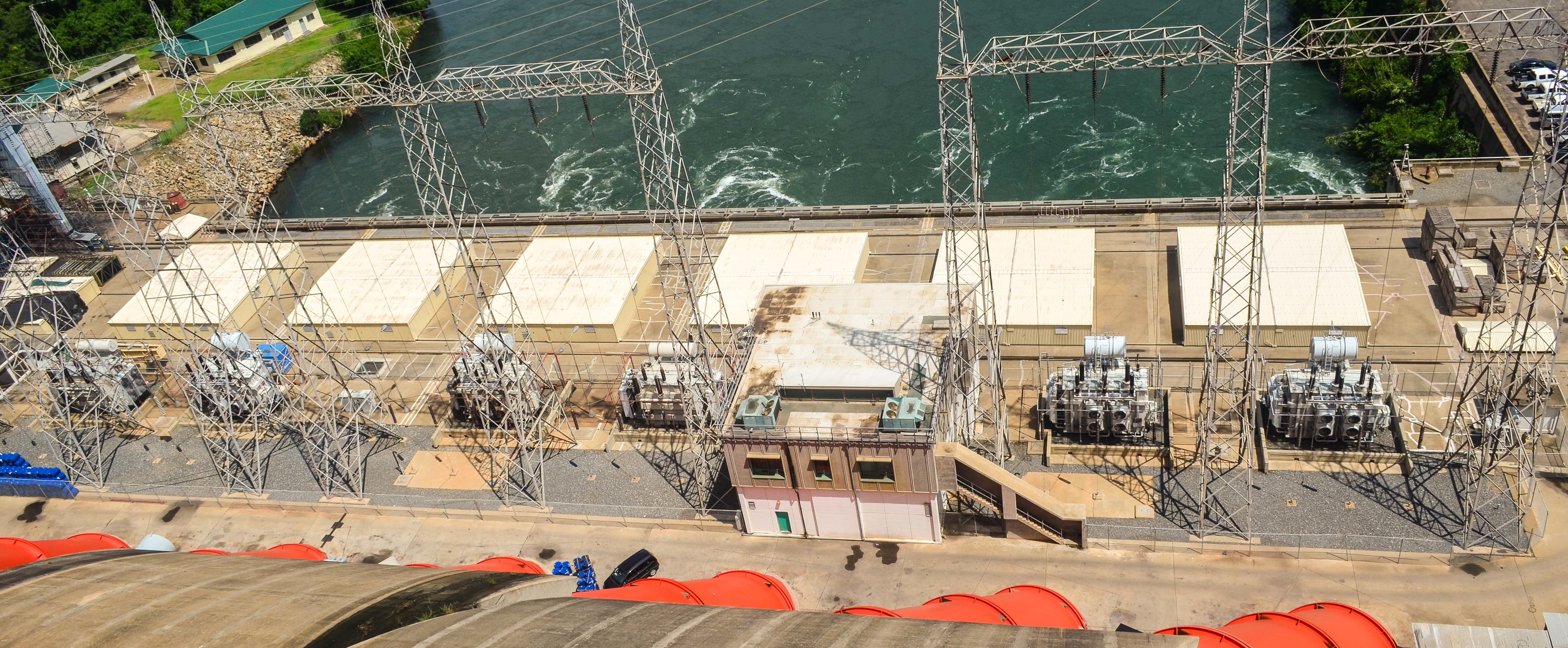
Wide dynamic range of Akosombo Hydroelectric Project: hydroelectric dam on Lake Volta in Akosombo, Eastern region, Akosombo canyon. The construction of the dam in the Volta Basin resulted in the subsequent creation of Lake Volta. Lake Volta is the Earth's largest man-made lake and artificial lake, covering 8,502 square kilometres (3,283 sq mi), which is 3.6% of Ghana's landform.

== Education ==
=== Senior High Schools ===
- Abetifi Presbyterian Senior High School
- Abetifi Technical School
- Abetifi Vocational Institute
- Abomosu STEM SHS
- Abuakwa State College
- Aburi Girls' Senior High School
- Aburi Presby Senior High
- Adeisu Presbyterian Senior High School
- Adonten Senior High School
- Adukrom Presbyterian Senior High Technical School
- Akim Achiase Senior High School
- Akim Swedru Senior High School
- Akro Senior High Technical School, Odumase Krobo
- Akwamuman Senior High School
- Akwatia Technical Institute
- Akosombo International School
- Anum Presby Senior High School
- Asafo Senior High School
- Asamankese Senior High School
- Asesewa Senior High School
- Akuse Methodist Senior High School
- Akro Senior High School
- Apersua Community Senior High School
- Asuom Senior High School
- Begoro Presbyterian Senior High School
- Benkum Senior High School
- Boso Senior High Tech School
- Donkorkrom Agric Senior High School
- Ghana Senior High School, Koforidua
- H'Mount Sinai Senior High School
- Islamic girls Senior High School
- Kade Senior High-Technical School
- Kibi Secondary Technical Senior High School
- Kibi Technical Institute
- Klo Agogo Senior High School
- Koforidua Senior High Technical School
- Krobo Girls Senior High School
- Kwabeng Anglican Senior High and Technical School
- Legacy Girls' College, Akuse
- Mangoase Senior High School
- Manya Krobo Senior High School
- Methodist Girls' High School (Mamfe)
- Akuse Methodist Senior High Technical School
- Mpraeso Senior High School
- New Abirem Senior High School
- New Juaben Senior High Commercial School
- New Nsutam Senior High School
- Nifa Senior High School
- Nkawkaw Senior High School
- Nkwatia Presby Senior High School
- Nsawam Senior High school
- Oda Senior High School
- Ofori Panin Senior High School
- Okuapeman Senior High School
- Osino Senior High School
- Oti Boateng Senior High School
- Oyoko Methodist Senior High School
- Presbyterian Senior High School, Akuapim-Mampong
- Presbyterian Senior High Technical School, Adukrom
- Pope John Senior High School and Minor Seminary
- Saint Francis Senior High School
- Saviour Senior High School
- Sekyere SDA Senior High School
- Somanya Senior High Technical School.
- St Fidelis Senior High School
- St Matins Senior High School
- St Paul's Senior Secondary School
- St. Peter's Boys Senior High School
- St Roses Senior High (Akwatia)
- St Stephens senior and technical
- St Thomas Senior High Technical School, Asamankese
- Suhum Presbyterian Senior High School
- Suhum Senior High and Technical School
- W.B.M.Zion Senior High School, Old Tafo,
- Yilo Krobo Senior High School

The region also boasts of some quality basic schools, one of which is Hecta School Complex, established in 1962, and others.

=== Colleges ===
- Kibi Presbyterian College of Education
- Presbyterian College of Education, Akropong
- Presbyterian Women's College of Education
- Mount Mary College of Education, Somanya
- Seventh Day Adventist College of Education, Asokore
- Abetifi Presbyterian College of Education

=== Universities ===
- Ashesi University
- All Nations University
- University College of Agriculture and Environmental Studies
- Koforidua Technical University
- Presbyterian University College (Abetifi Kwahu)
- Presbyterian University college (Akropong)
- University of Environment and Sustainable Development, Somanya

== Districts ==
=== District changes ===
Achiase District was carved out of the existing Birim South District and inaugurated on 22 February 2019. The Afram Plains District has since been split into two and renamed as Kwahu Afram Plains North District with its capital being Donkorkrom and Kwahu Afram Plains South District with its capital also being Tease. The Akuapim South District, East Akim District and Kwahu West Districts have been upgraded to municipal status with the addition of Birim Central Municipal District, which is entirely new. Other new districts include Akyemansa District and Kwahu East District. The Manya Krobo District has been split into Lower Manya Krobo District and Upper Manya Krobo District.

=== Administrative divisions ===
The political administration of the region is through the local government system. Under this administration system, the region is divided into 33 MMDAs, each headed by a presiding member elected from among the members themselves. The MMDAs were increased from 9 to 15 in 1988, then from 15 to 17 in 2004, then from 17 to 21 in 2008, then from 21 to 26 in 2012, and recently from 26 to 33 in 2018. The current list is as follows:

District	Capital	Constituency	Member of Parliament	Party
Abuakwa North Municipal	Kukurantumi	Abuakwa North	Gifty Twum Ampofo	NPP
Abuakwa South Municipal	Kibi	Abuakwa South	Samuel Atta Akyea	NPP
Achiase	Achiase	Achiase	Kofi Ahenkorah Marfo	NPP
Akuapim North Municipal	Akropong	Akropong	Nana Ama Dokua Asiamah Adjei	NPP
Akuapim South	Aburi	Akwapim South	Osei Bonsu Amoah	NPP
Akyemansa	Ofoase	Ofoase-Ayirebi	Kojo Oppong-Nkrumah	NPP
Asene Manso Akroso	Manso	Asene Akroso Manso	George Kwame Aboagye	NPP
Asuogyaman	Atimpoku	Asuogyaman	Thomas Nyarko Ampem	NDC
Atiwa East	Anyinam	Atiwa East	Abena Osei Asare	NPP
Atiwa West	Kwabeng	Atiwa West	Kwesi Amoako Atta	NPP
Ayensuano	Coaltar	Ayensuano	Teddy Safori Addi	NDC
Birim Central Municipal	Akim Oda	Akim Oda	Alexander Akwasi Acquah	NPP
Birim North	New Abirem	Abirem	John Frimpong Osei	NPP
Birim South	Akim Swedru	Akim Swedru	Kennedy Osei Nyarko	NPP
Denkyembour	Akwatia	Akwatia	Henry Yiadom Boakye	NDC
Fanteakwa North	Begoro	Fanteakwa North	Kwabena Amankwa Asiamah	NPP
Fanteakwa South	Osino	Fanteakwa South	Kofi Okyere-Agyekum	NPP
Kwaebibirem Municipal	Kade	Kade	Alexander Agyare	NPP
Kwahu Afram Plains North	Donkorkrom	Afram Plains North	Betty Crosby Mensah	NDC
Kwahu Afram Plains South	Tease, Ghana	Afram Plains South	Joseph Appiah Boateng	NDC
Kwahu East	Abetifi	Abetifi	Bryan Achemapong	NPP
Kwahu South	Mpraeso	Mpraeso	Davis Ansah Opoku	NPP
Kwahu West Municipal	Nkawkaw	Nkawkaw	Joseph Frimpong	NPP
Lower Manya Krobo Municipal	Krobo Odumase	Lower Manya	Ebenezer Okletey Terlabi	NDC
New Juaben North Municipal	Effiduase	New Juaben North	Kwasi Boateng Adjei	NPP
New Juaben South Municipal	Koforidua	New Juaben South	Michael Okyere Baafi	NPP
Nsawam Adoagyire Municipal	Nsawam	Nsawam Adoagyiri	Frank Annoh-Dompreh	NPP
Okere	Adukrom	Okere	Daniel Botwe	NPP
Suhum Municipal	Suhum	Suhum	Kwadjo Asante	NPP
Upper Manya Krobo	Asesewa	Upper Manya	Bismark Tetteh Nyarko	NDC
Upper West Akim	Adeiso	Upper West Akim	Frederick Obeng Adom	NPP
West Akim Municipal	Asamankese	Lower West Akim	Charles Acheampong	NPP
Yilo Krobo Municipal	Somanya	Yilo Krobo	Albert Tetteh Nyakotey	NDC

Districts of the Eastern Region

== Tourist Sites ==
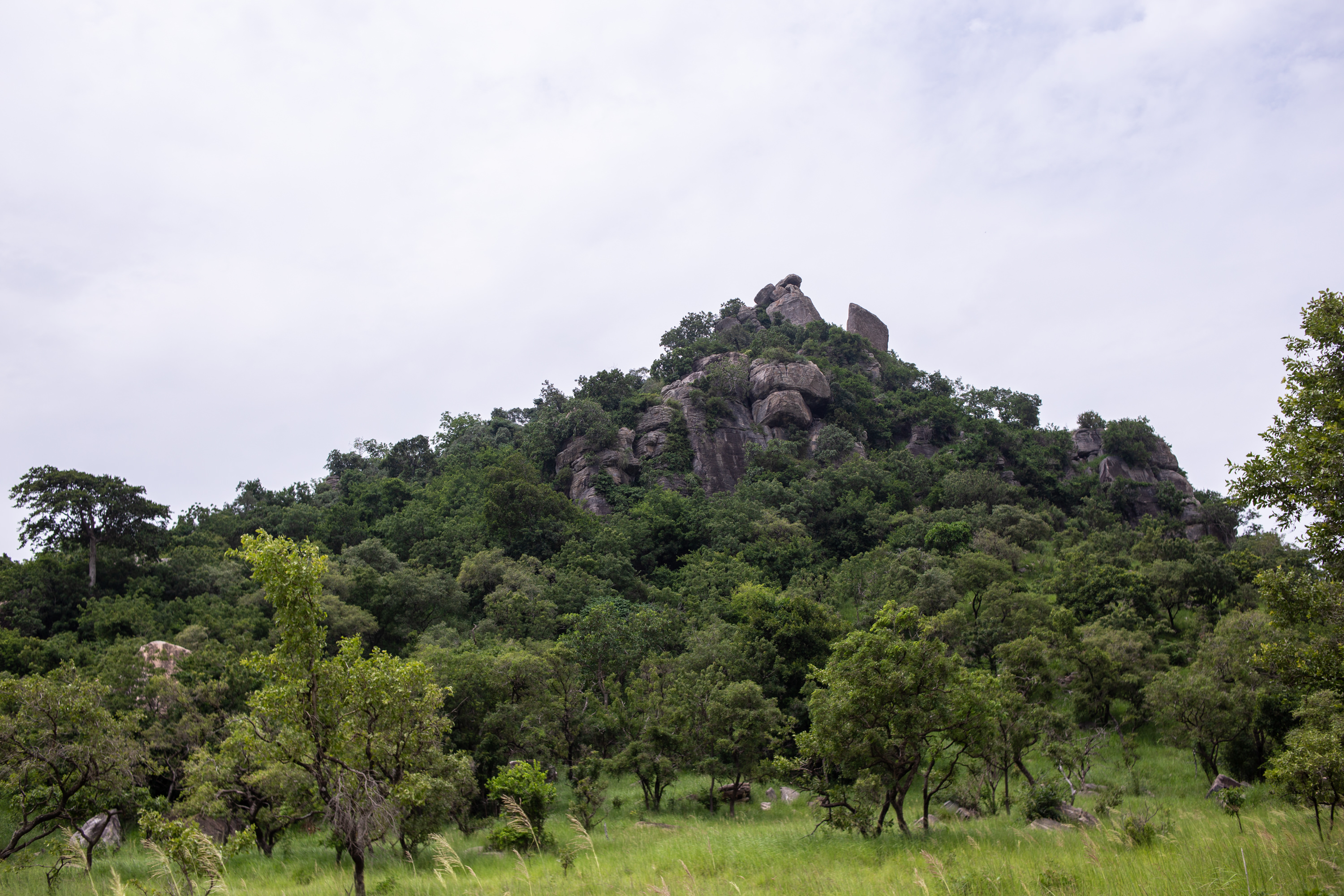
Shai Hills Resource Reserve

- Aburi Botanical Garden
- Boti Waterfalls
- Akosombo Dam
- Shai Hills Resource Reserve
- Umbrella Rock
- Atewa Range Forest Reserve
- Lake Volta
- The Big Tree at Oda
- Tetteh Quarshie Cocoa Farm
- Bead Factory
- Dodi Island
- Adomi Bridge
- Akaa Waterfalls
- Ghana Bike and Hike Tours
- Kwahu plateau
- Akwawa Mountain Peak

== Famous native citizens ==
Famous native citizens of Eastern region
#	Citizen	Settlement
1	Nana Akufo-Addo	Kibi
2	Seth Terkper	Krobo Odumase
3	George Boateng	Nkawkaw
4	Dr. J. B. Danquah	Kibi
5	Samuel Wilberforce Awuku-Darko	Suhum
6	Frederick W. K. Akuffo	Akropong
7	Thomas Teye Partey	Krobo Odumase
8	Okyehemaa Nana Dokua Adutwumwaa	Kibi
9	Osagyefuo Amoatia Ofori Panin	Kibi
10	Ken Ofori-Atta	Kibi
11	Samuel Atta Akyea	Kibi
12	Hackman Owusu Agyemang	Koforidua
