= Suhum Secondary Technical School =

Suhum Secondary Technical School/ Suhum Senior High Technical School
- SUTESCO

Location
- P. O. Box 201; Suhum; Ghana; 6°02′08″N 0°27′12″W

Information
- Type: co-educational boarding school
- Motto: Nothing but the Best
- Religious affiliation: Non-denominational Christian
- Established: 1963 (62 years ago)
- Founder: Dr. Kwame Nkrumah
- School board: Board of Governors
- School district: Suhum Municipal District
- Authority: Ministry of Education
- Oversight: Ghana Education Service
- Headmaster: Mr. Ebenezer Nkansah Dankwah
- Grades: Forms 1–3 (Grades 6-12)
- Gender: Co-educational (Boys/Girls)
- Age range: 14 to 19 years
- Language: English
- Campus: Suhum Roundabout
- Campus type: Residential garden-style setting
- Houses: 4
- Colors: Yellow and Blue
- Slogan: Akan: Abenfo
- Courses: General Science; Technical; General Arts; STEM; Business

Suhum Secondary Technical School (SUTESCO) is a co-ed secondary technical school in Suhum in the Eastern Region of Ghana founded in 1963 and also was the first secondary technical school to be built in the Eastern Region of Ghana

== History ==
SUTESCO was founded in 1963 by the then head of state, Kwame Nkrumah with a student population of 71. The school, which started as an all-boys school became a co-ed school in 1991 after the 2987 reforms. As at 2013, the school had population of 1500 with about 250 being girls.

== Notable alumni ==
- Professor Kwasi Opoku Amankwa - Director General of the Ghana Education Service
- Professor Victor Gadzekpo - Ghanaian academic, former Vice-Chancellor of Data Link University College
- Professor Samuel Sraku Lartey - Vice-Chancellor of Presbyterian University College
- Patrick Darko Missah - Director General of the Ghana Prisons Service
- David Asante-Apeatu - Inspector General of Police Ghana Police Service
- Sylvanus Dodji jeoffrey (Captain Planet of 4x4)- musician
- Richard Asante(Kalybos)-Actor
- Kwadjo Asante - Former Member of Parliament, Suhum (Ghana parliament constituency)
