= J. Nee Amahtey Hyde =

Ghanaian politician

Joseph Nee Amahtey Hyde

Member of the Ghana Parliament for Okaikwei
- In office 1979–1981
- President: Hilla Limann
- Preceded by: Carl Daniel Reindorf
- Succeeded by: Constituency split

Personal details
- Born: Joseph Nee Amahtey Hyde; 9 October 1933 Asuboi, Eastern Region, Gold Coast
- Died: 2 January 2024 (aged 90) Accra
- Spouse: Dinah Barbara Hyde
- Children: Samuel Adolphus Nii Ayi Hyde, James Edward Nii Adjama Hyde, Anne-Barbara Naa Ayeley Hyde, Joseph Nii Amahtey Hyde (Jnr) (Deceased) and Peter Henry Nii Tackie Abia Hyde
- Education: Scriba Commercial, Accra

Joseph Nee Amahtey Hyde (9 October 1933 - 2 January 2024) was a Ghanaian accountant and politician. He was the president of the Institute of Chartered Accountants of Ghana from 1996 to 1998, and the Member of Parliament of the Okaikwei Constituency from 1979 until 1981 when the Limann government was overthrown.

== Early life and education ==
J. N. A. Hyde was born on 9 October 1933, in Asuboi near Suhum, located in the Eastern Region of Ghana. He was the fourth of nine children. His father, Henry Ayi Aku Hyde, and his mother, Emelia Ayele Hyde were both of the Ga tribe. His father’s work for the Methodist church necessitated the family's frequent relocations.

Joe Hyde's educational journey began at the Dodowa Methodist School at the age of six. However, due to his father's job transfers, he had to continue his primary education at Apedwa in the Eastern Region and later at the Methodist Boys School in Adabraka, Accra, at the age of eight. Financial constraints were a constant challenge for the family, compelling him to engage in various odd jobs to support his education. He spent his evenings carting fish at Abola and Jamestown beaches and trapping crabs in the Korle Lagoon to earn money for school fees, uniforms, and books.

In 1948, he completed Standard Seven and performed exceptionally well in the entrance exams for Accra Academy, ranking among the top three students. However, he was unable to go to the school due to his family's inability to afford the expenses associated with the school.

Joe Hyde embarked on a teaching career at Mamprobi Methodist Primary School while simultaneously pursuing further education. In 1949, he enrolled at Scriba Commercial College, located in the central business area of Accra, under the mentorship of Chikuchaka Sungo Adjei. At the age of 17, Joe Hyde successfully passed the London Chamber of Commerce Advanced Exams in Accounting, Economics, Commerce, Commercial Law, and English. In 1958, he passed the Intermediate exams of the Association of Certified and Corporate Accountants (ACCA) and completed Part III in 1959.

== Career ==
Hyde initially worked as a doctor's personal secretary at Ridge Hospital. He then joined the Accounts Department of the University College of The Gold Coast (now University of Ghana), and subsequently, he became a Senior Accounts Clerk at the Kwame Nkrumah College of Science and Technology (now Kwame Nkrumah University of Science and Technology). After a few years, he took a position as an accountant for the West Africa Cocoa Research Institute (now Cocoa Research Institute of Ghana) in Tafo and also briefly acted as Secretary concurrently.

Together with his wife, Hyde visited the United Kingdom on a study tour in 1962. Following this trip, Hyde joined IBM in 1963 and focused on studying the use of computers in business. Between 1963 and 1964, Hyde installed computers at Ibadan University and introduced them to Electronic Data Processing. He played a key role in implementing several applications, including the Social Security and National Insurance Scheme in 1965. He worked in various capacities at the University of Ghana, Kumasi City Council Property and General Rates, Valco, and the State Housing Corporation.

In 1967, Hyde joined the State Insurance Corporation (now SIC Insurance Company) as the Chief Internal Auditor, but he left for the United Kingdom in October 1968 on a British Government Three-Year Scholarship. Hyde completed the ACCA Final in June 1969 and also passed the finals of the Institute of Taxation, London in 1969. He subsequently joined the accounting firm Dodoo, Lobban & Co. (which later became Lobban-Hyde & Co Chartered Accounts) in 1971.

Hyde served on several boards. He was a member of the Methodist Men's Fellowship from 1984 to 2003 and the President of the Institute of Chartered Accountants, Ghana from 1996 to 1998. He was also a Resource Person for the Ghana Good Governance Forum. Additionally, he served as Chairman of Prison Fellowship Ghana and the Africa Region, the Greater Accra Region Red Cross Society, and Ga Rural Bank Ltd, Amasaman. Hyde was a Director of ARB Apex Bank from 2009 to 2011 and a Director at Unilever Ghana Limited. He also coordinated the first workshop on the work of the Parliamentary Finance/Public Accounts Committee in 1993.

== Politics ==
Hyde entered politics by joining the Peoples National Party (PNP) and became the Parliamentary Candidate for the Okaikwei Constituency in 1979, where he was elected as their Member of Parliament (MP). In Parliament, he served as the Chairman of the Parliamentary Finance Committee until the coup in 1981. In 1980, Hyde was appointed the Board Chairman for Ashanti Goldfields Corporation. He also served as a Special Adviser to President Limann during the Third Republic from 1979 to 1981. Following the coup d'état in 1981, he was imprisoned as a political prisoner in Nsawam Prison from January 1982 to October 1984.

== Personal life ==
Hyde married Dinah Barbara Naa-Djanwah Mingle who was aged twenty-one in 1958. They had five children, four boys and one girl.

He was a Lodge member of the Grand United Order of Odd Fellows, reaching the rank of Grand Master in 1987 and establishing the Lodge of Togo in 1989.

In the Methodist Church of Ghana, he served as a Class Leader and Lay Preacher. He also held various roles as Treasurer from 1974 to 1987 and was the Diocesan Treasurer and Circuit Steward from 1992 to 2000. In 1997, he built and donated the Wesley Junior Secondary School to the Methodist Church in Accra.

A passionate football enthusiast, he founded and chaired the Susubribi Football Club in 1962/63. He was an avid supporter of four UK football clubs: Liverpool, Aston Villa,Manchester United and Manchester City.

Hyde died on 2 January 2024. His funeral service was held at the Wesley Methodist Cathedral in Accra on 27 January 2024.
