= Ransford Agyapong =

Ghanaian politician

MP for suhum
- In office 7 January 2001 – 6 January 2005
- President: John Agyekum Kufour
- Succeeded by: Frederick Opare-Ansah

Personal details
- Born: 27-04-1937 Suhum, Eastern Region
- Party: New Patriotic Party
- Occupation: Politician

Ransford Agyapong is a Ghanaian politician and a former member of parliament for the Suhum (Ghana parliament constituency) of the eastern region of Ghana. He is currently the chairman for New Patriotic Party elections committee of the suhum constituency.

== Early life and education ==
Agyapong hails from suhum in the eastern region of Ghana.

== Politics ==
Agyapong is a member of the 3rd Parliament of the 4th republic of Ghana. His political career began in 1996 when he contested as a parliamentary candidate for the Suhum (Ghana parliament constituency) on the ticket of the New Patriotic Party and lost to Solomon Kodjoe Akwetey of the national democratic congress who obtained 18,181 making 43.90% of the total valid votes cast that year. He contested again in 2000 Ghanaian general elections and won this time with a total of 16,494 making 54.90% of the total valid votes cast that year. His political career ended during his last year in office in 2004.

== Career ==
Agyapong is currently the chairman for New Patriotic Party elections committee of the Suhum (Ghana parliament constituency). He is also the former member of Parliament for the Suhum (Ghana parliament constituency)in the Eastern Region of Ghana.
