= Nkawkaw Senior High School =

School in Nkawkaw, Ghana

Coordinates: 6°32′15″N 0°45′28″W

- Nkawkaw , Kwahu West Municipal District, Eastern Region; Ghana

Information
- Type: secondary/high school
- Motto: Education for Service
- Established: 1969 (57 years ago)
- Grades: Forms [1–3]
- Nickname: KAWSEC

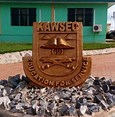

Nkawkaw Senior High School also known as KAWSEC is a public senior high school located in Nkawkaw in the Eastern Region of Ghana. The school was established in the year 1969. It is a coed secondary school with day and boarding accommodation.

== History ==
In 1964, Nkawkaw Senior High School operated as a training college. The college was known as Nkawkaw Training College and was housed on the land of a man named W. A. Wiafe, who gave the college temporary permission to use his home, which is known as "Tobacco house," for educational purposes. In addition to being a successful businessman, Mr. W. A. Wiafe was a politician and traditional leader in his town. The college was remodeled into a secondary school and continued to be housed at "Tobacco House" five years later, in 1969. A portion of the new KAWSEC continued to operate as a teacher training college until finally, five years later, in 1974, the college had to close. From 1969 to 1978, the recognized Rt. Rev. Victor Buer Nartey-Tokoli served as the first Headmaster of Nkawkaw Secondary School. He was a highly regarded Methodist Church priest, an exceptional educationist, a devoted public servant, a great father, and a counselor. He laid the groundwork for the school's success by emphasizing truth, discipline, diligence, and service to the community.

When the government decided to close the then-Nkawkaw Training College in rural Nkawkaw in 1968, it took the strength of the Rt. Rev. Nartey-Tokoli to take on the task of creating Nkawkaw Secondary School out of the Training College's embers. Due to the tact and influence of the Rt. Rev., the agreement to lease on the privately owned site where Nkawkaw Secondary School was founded in October 1969 was extended. He expanded the school from having a Day-only setup to a Day-Boarding setup. By sheer determination, he was able to obtain a sizable piece of land, obtain support from the government, construct new buildings and facilities, and ultimately move the entire school to the current location that serves as the campus to this day. Every activity at the school began and ended with a prayer, as he guided it in the genuine spirit of the Lord. He lived an excellent Christian life. It was not unexpected that Rt. Rev. joined the teaching profession given the continuously impressive academic performance.

The late Rt. Rev. Victor Buer Nartey-Tokoli went above and beyond in fulfilling his vow, visiting public spaces like as marketplaces, churches, and schools to persuade guardians and students to enroll in the recently opened Nkawkaw Secondary School. In addition to those hired straight out of middle schools, the inaugural class of students at Nkawkaw Secondary School comprised former student teachers, middle school dropouts who became street vendors, laborers, small traders, and "station boys." Had it not been for the Rt. Reverend's courageous rescue attempt, a large many of us would have dropped out. The slogan of the school is "Education for Service" which finds expression in the life of Mr. Peter John Moss, a British volunteer who went on to become an Anglican priest in the UK. In keeping with the school's slogan of "Education for Service," many of the late Rt. Rev. Victor Buer Nartey-Tokoli's students are currently helping our country and other countries in various capacities thanks to his impact and vision.

== Programs offered ==
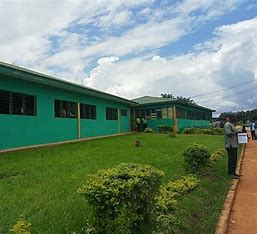
classroom

The school offers six programs of study - General Arts, General Science, Business, Agriculture, Home Economics and Visual Arts

== School facilities ==
- Computer Lab
- Library
- Classroom Blocks

== Notable alumni ==
- Yeboah Murphy, Brigadier General
- Frederick Opare Ansah, former MP for Suhum Constituency
- Kofi Nyanteh Akuffo, High Court Judge
- Moses Anim, MP for Trobu Constituency
