= Meduma =

Community in Ashanti Region, Ghana

- Town
- Country: Ghana
- Region: Ashanti Region
- District: Kwabre East Municipality

Population
  - Total: —
- Time zone: GMT
  - Summer (DST): GMT

Meduma is a community in the Kwabre East Municipality of the Ashanti Region of Ghana. The Nsutaman Rural Bank has a branch in Meduma.
