= Teddy Safori Addi =

Ghanaian politician

Hon Teddy Safori Addi
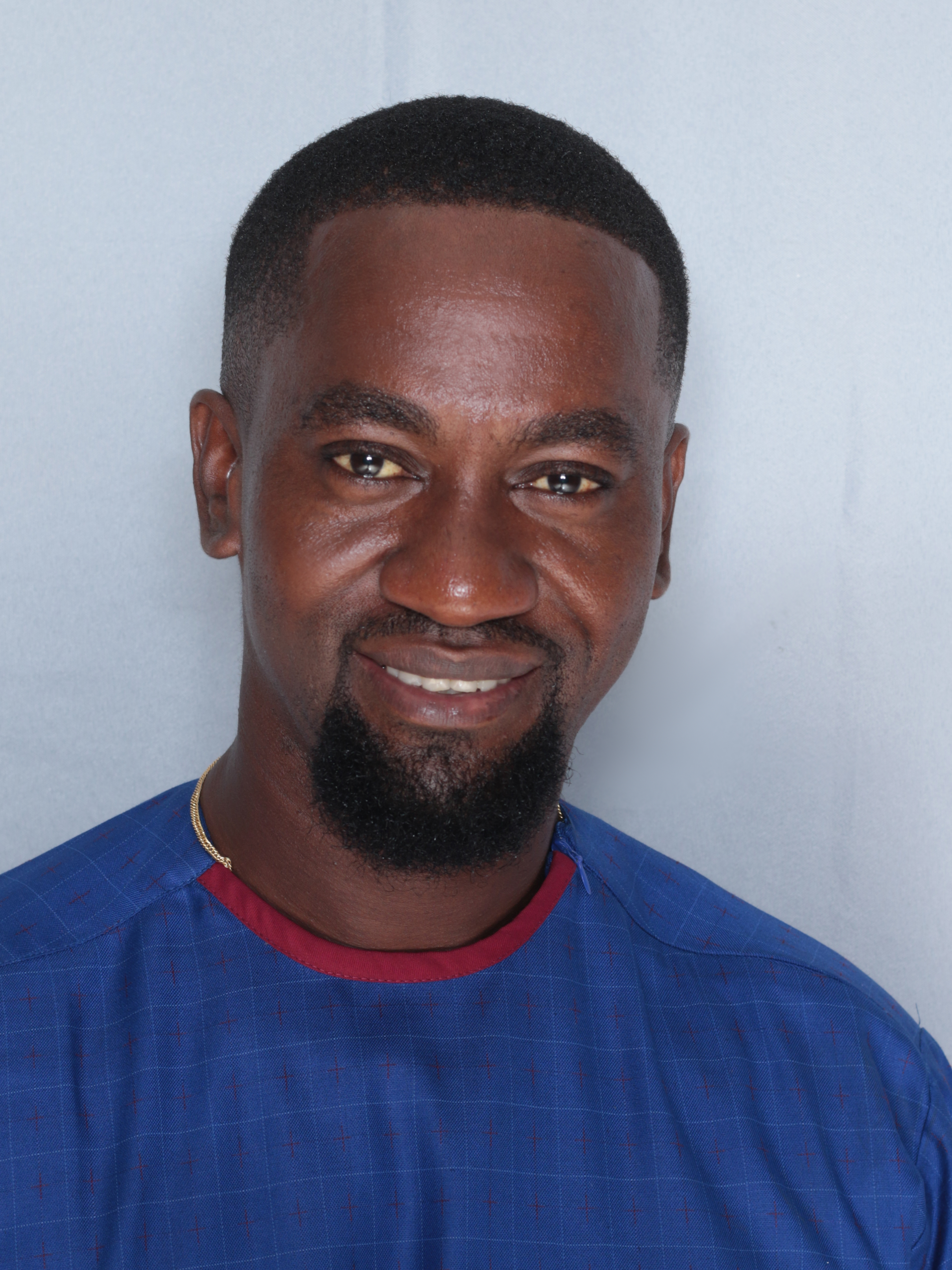

Member of the Ghana Parliament for Ayensuano
- In office 7 January 2021 – 6 January 2025
- Preceded by: Hon Samuel Ayeh-Paye
- Succeeded by: Ida Adjoa Asiedu
- President: Nana Addo Dankwa Akuffo Addo

Personal details
- Born: Teddy Safori Addi; 26 January 1984 (age 42) Coalter
- Party: National Democratic Congress
- Education: Okuapeman Senior high school
- Occupation: Politician
- Profession: Businessman and Project Manager
- Committees: Privileges Committee, Employment, Social Welfare and State Enterprises Committee, Public Accounts Committee
- Portfolio: Opposition MP

Teddy Safori Addi (born Thursday, 26 January 1984) is a Ghanaian politician and member of the National Democratic Congress. He was the member of parliament for the Ayensuano Constituency from January 2021 to January 2025. He is the project manager for AnADDI Group.

== Early life and education ==
Addi hails from Coaltar in the Eastern Region (Ghana). He holds a BSc in Project Management.

== Personal life ==
Born Christian and a native of Coaltar, the capital of the Ayensuano Constituency in the Eastern Region of Ghana. He is a road contractor and a married man.
