= Frank Asiedu Bekoe =

Ghanaian political strategist and educator

Member of Parliament for 9th Suhum (Ghana parliament constituency)
- Incumbent
- Assumed office January 7, 2025
- Preceded by: Kwadjo Asante

Personal details
- Born: Frank Asiedu Bekoe; July 9, 1977 (age 49) Kumasi, Ghana
- Party: New Patriotic Party
- Children: 3
- Education: Suhum Secondary Technical School; Mampong Technical College of Education; University of Ghana; GIMPA
- Occupation: Businessman, politician, farmer, consultant
- Website: https://frankasiedubekoe.com/
- Nickname: Protozoa

Frank Asiedu Bekoe (born July 9, 1977) is a Ghanaian political strategist, educator, and member of the New Patriotic Party (NPP). He is the member of Parliament for Suhum in the Eastern Region. He represents the constituency in the Ninth Parliament of the Fourth Republic of Ghana as a member of the New Patriotic Party.

He was appointed director of political affairs at the Office of the Chief of Staff at Ghana's presidency.

== Early life ==
Bekoe was born in Kumasi, Ghana, in the Ashanti Region of Ghana. He lived in communities including Bedam in Achiase District, Adiembra in Assin North (Ghana parliament constituency), Kwabena Kumi, Suhum and later in Accra.

== Education and career ==
Bekoe had his basic education at Forces Primary Burma Camp, Suhum New Town Basic, HECTA International School, continued to Suhum Secondary Technical School, and later studied at Mampong Technical Teachers College before enrolling at the University of Ghana for a Diploma. He later pursued higher education at Ghana Institute of Management and Public Administration earning a Bachelor of Science in Operations and Project Management, and the Ghana Armed Forces Command and Staff College for a Master of Science in Defence and International Politics.

Bekoe worked as a teacher before joining VAT service. He later resigned from public service to active partisan politics.

== Politics ==
Bekoe was voted two consecutive times as the New Patriotic Party constituency secretary for the Ayawaso West in the Greater Accra Region.

In 2016, after Nana Akufo-Addo won the presidential election, the chief of staff, Akosua Frema Osei-Opare, appointed Bekoe as director of political affairs at the presidency.

In December 2023, Bekoe announced his intention to contest for the parliamentary candidacy primaries of the New Patriotic Party in the Suhum constituency.

In 2024, he won the New Patriotic Party primaries for the Suhum constituency, beating the then-incumbent Member of parliament, Kwadjo Asante by polling 496 votes against the incumbent's 320 votes.

In the 2024 Ghanaian general election, he won the parliamentary seat for the New Patriotic Party in the Suhum constituency, beating the candidate of the National Democratic Congress (Ghana), Prince Addo Kwadjo Tabiri, the former Member of Parliament who contested as an independent candidate, Kwadjo Asante and another independent candidate, Frederick Dede Wiafe. He is the deputy ranking member of the Parliament Select Committee on Employment, Labour Relations and Pensions and a member of the Budget Committee.

== Personal life ==
Frank is a Christian and married with three children.

== Philanthropy ==
In November 2020, he donated 40 sewing machines to some indigenes in the Suhum Municipal area to promote vocational skills in the community.

In July 2024, he pledged support to an 11-year old who could not speak and walk.

In October 2024, he donated medical equipment including an incubator, baby warmer, doctor's examination bed, wheelchair, and an electrocardiogram (ECG) machine to the Suhum Government Hospital in the Eastern Region.
