= Immanuel Obeng-Darko =

Ghanaian politician

Immanuel Ellis Obeng-Darko

Member of Parliament for Suhum
- President: Jerry John Rawlings
- Parliamentary group: National Democratic Congress

Personal details
- Born: 7 December 1952 (age 73)
- Education: Bagabaga Training College and St. Andrews College of Agric.
- Occupation: Teacher and farmer

Immanuel Ellis Obeng-Darko (born 7 December 1952) is a Ghanaian politician and member of the first parliament of the fourth republic of Ghana representing Suhum constituency under the membership of the National Democratic Congress (NDC).

== Early life and education ==
Immanuel was born on 7 December 1952. He attended the Bagabaga Training College and St. Andrews College of Agric, where he obtained his GCE Ordinary Level and Diploma in Agriculture. He worked as a Teacher and Farmer before going into parliament.

== Politics ==
He began his political career in 1992 when he became the parliamentary candidate for the National Democratic Congress (NDC) to represent his constituency in the Central Region of Ghana prior to the commencement of the 1992 Ghanaian parliamentary election.

He was sworn into the First Parliament of the Fourth Republic of Ghana on 7 January 1993 after being pronounced winner at the 1992 Ghanaian election held on 29 December 1992.

After serving his four years tenure in office, Immanuel lost his candidacy to his fellow party comrade Solomon Kodjoe Akwetey. He defeated Ransford Yaw Agyepong of the New Patriotic Party (NPP) who polled 12,907 votes representing 31.10% of the total votes cast, Doreen Ellen Adamson of the Convention People's Party who polled 2,840 votes representing 6.90% of the total votes cast, Emmanuel Todd Peasah of the National Convention Party (NCP) who polled 341 votes representing 0.80% of the total votes cast and Patrick Nartey Djaba of the People's National Convention (PNC) who polled 305 votes representing 0.70% of the total votes cast at the 1996 Ghanaian general elections. Solomon polled 18,181 votes which was equivalent to 43.90% of the total valid votes cast. He was thereafter elected on 7 January 1997.
