= Ghana Interbank Payment and Settlement Systems =

Government of Ghana agency

Ghana Interbank Payment and Settlement Systems Limited
- Type: Subsidiary
- Industry: Financial technology, Payment systems
- Founded: May 2007; 19 years ago
- Founder: Bank of Ghana
- Headquarters: Ridge, Accra, Ghana
- Area served: Nationwide (Ghana)
- Key people: Clara Arthur (CEO)
- Products: e‑zwich; gh‑link; GhIPSS Instant Pay (GIP); GhanaPay; GhQR; Mobile Money Interoperability (MMI); Ghana Automated Clearing House (GACH); Cheque Codeline Clearing (CCC)
- Revenue: US $20.2 million (estimated)
- Number of employees: ~96 (2024 estimate)
- Parent: Bank of Ghana
- Website: ghipss.net

Ghana Interbank Payment and Settlement Systems Limited (GhIPSS) is the national payment infrastructure provider in Ghana. It was established in May 2007 as a wholly owned subsidiary of the Bank of Ghana, with the mandate to implement and manage interoperable electronic payment systems for banks and non-bank financial institutions.

== History ==
GhIPSS was created to modernize Ghana's payment systems infrastructure and ensure seamless interbank transactions.

== Payment systems and services ==
=== e-zwich ===
Ghana’s national biometric smart card system, designed to improve financial inclusion across ATMs, POS, and banks.

=== Cheque Codeline Clearing (CCC) & Ghana Automated Clearing House (GACH) ===
Enable bulk processing of cheque and direct credit/debit transactions.

=== gh-link ===
A domestic interbank switch supporting ATM, POS, online payments, and 3-D secure transactions.

=== GhIPSS Instant Pay (GIP) ===
Real-time payment platform allowing users to transfer money instantly between banks and mobile wallets.

=== Mobile Money Interoperability (MMI) ===
Allows cross-network mobile money transactions and transfers between mobile wallets and bank accounts.

=== GhanaPay ===
A bank-led mobile wallet that enables inclusive access to banking services.

=== Third Party Settlement Service (GTPSS) ===
Enables interbank settlements for mobile money providers and fintech platforms.

== See also ==
- e-zwich
- gh-link
