= Atwima Rural Bank =

Ghanaian rural bank

Atwima Rural Bank Ltd
- Industry: Financial services
- Founded: 1980
- Headquarters: P.O.Box KW 33 Kwadaso, Kumasi, Ghana
- Key people: Kwabena Awuah (Chairman)

Atwima Rural Bank Ltd is a rural bank founded in 1980 and located in Kumasi, Ghana. Like other rural banks in Ghana it provides banking services to the rural population and is regulated by the ARB Apex Bank.

In 2008 the bank informed that its deposits grew from GH¢29,379 in 2006 to GH¢3,615,010 in 2007.

Atwima Rural Bank was included to The impact of Rural Banks on Poverty Alleviation in Ghana study, because it operates at peri-urban area.
