= E-zwich =

E-zwich is the national switch and smart card payment system of Ghana. The system is managed by the Ghana Interbank Payment and Settlement Systems.The Ghana National Smart Card Payment System, called E-zwich, is a smart card provided by the Ghana Interbank Payment and Settlement Systems Limited. It is used for various financial transactions, including cash withdrawals, online payments, and money transfers. E-zwich is among the most widely used cashless payment methods in the country. The e-zwich card is linked to a user’s fingerprint for added security and can be used across multiple banks and financial institutions in the country. It is one of the most commonly used electronic payment systems in Ghana, especially for individuals without traditional bank accounts.

== FEATURES OF E-ZWICH CARD. ==
- Electronic loading of funds
- Biometric (finger print) identification
- Valid for 10 years
- It is an account (one of the safest place to keep your money)
- Receiving salary and wage payment
- Target customers are mass affluent

== BENEFIT OF E-ZWICH CARD ==
- Instant loading and transfer of fund using GPRS
- Can do transactions at any bank
- Cash deposits
- Cash transfers
- Receiving salary and wage payment
- Making bill payments from any e-zwich point of sale or ATM across the country.
- Easy payment for goods and services
- Eliminates the risk and inconvenience of carrying cash
- Safe and secured because of the finger print identification

== See also ==
- Gh-link
