= Suhum (Ghana parliament constituency) =

Constituency is in the Eastern region of Ghana

- constituency for the Parliament of Ghana
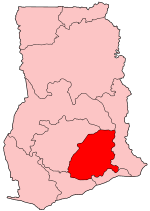
- District: Suhum/Kraboa/Coaltar District
- Region: Eastern Region of Ghana

Current constituency
- Created: 1992
- Party: New Patriotic Party
- MP: Frank Asiedu Bekoe

The Suhum constituency is in the Eastern region of Ghana with the town Suhum as its capital. The current member of Parliament for the constituency is Frank Asiedu Bekoe. He was elected on the ticket of the New Patriotic Party (NPP).

The constituency has elected six members of parliament since 1992, with Frederick Opare-Ansah being the longest serving MP ever in the constituency, while Immanuel Obeng-Darko, Solomon Kodjoe Akwetey, Ransford Agyapong and Kwadjo Asante have had a single term each.

The voting pattern took a drastic shift from being an NDC populated constituency in 1992 to becoming a more NPP aligned constituency from the 2000 Ghanaian general election to date.

== Flashpoint ==
The Suhum constituency among many others was declared as a flashpoint during the 2024 Ghanaian general election for its history of multiple incidents of politically motivated violence. The constituency is seen as a potential hotspot for pre-election violence, especially as rivalries spill into the broader community.

== List of MPs ==
Year	Member of Parliament	Political Party	Votes	President
1992	Immanuel Obeng-Darko	National Democratic Congress (Ghana)		Jerry Rawlings
1996	Solomon Kodjoe Akwetey	National Democratic Congress (Ghana)	18,181	Jerry Rawlings
2000	Ransford Agyapong	New Patriotic Party	16,494	John Kufuor
2004	Frederick Opare-Ansah	New Patriotic Party	21,720	John Kufuor
2008	Frederick Opare-Asah	New Patriotic Party	17,248	John Atta Mills
2012	Frederick Opare-Ansah	New Patriotic Party	24,046	John Atta Mills
2016	Frederick Opare-Ansah	New Patriotic Party	25,328	Nana Akufo-Addo
2020	Kwadjo Asante	New Patriotic Party	34,049	Nana Akufo-Addo
2024	Frank Asiedu Bekoe	New Patriotic Party	16,855	John Dramani Mahama

== Boundaries ==
The Suhum Constituency is one of the 276 constituencies represented in Ghana's parliament. It shares common boundaries with Ayensuano (Ghana parliament constituency) in the south-west, Akuapem North (Ghana parliament constituency) in the South-east, New Juaben North (Ghana parliament constituency) in the North-east and Akim Abuakwa South (Ghana parliament constituency) in the North-west.

== See also ==
- List of Ghana Parliament constituencies
