= Cynthia Emefa Ohene =

Ghanaian magistrate

District Magistrate, Suhum District Court

District Magistrate
- Appointed by: Judicial Service of Ghana

Assistant Secretary, Alliance of Circuit Judges and Magistrates-Ghana (ACJMG)
- Incumbent
- Assumed office July 2022

Personal details
- Born: Cynthia Emefa Ohene Ghana
- Spouse: Married
- Children: 4
- Education: University of Ghana (BA, 2005); GIMPA (LLB, 2013); Ghana School of Law
- Alma mater: University of Ghana; GIMPA; Ghana School of Law
- Occupation: Magistrate
- Known for: District Magistrate, Assistant Secretary of ACJMG

Her Worship Cynthia Emefa Ohene is a Ghanaian Magistrate and a member of the International Association of Women Judges (IAWJ) Ghana Chapter. She presides currently over the District Court at Suhum in the Eastern Region of Ghana.

== Education ==
She began her higher education from the University of Ghana, where she obtained a Bachelor of Arts degree (Hons) in Management and Psychology in 2005.

After her undergraduate studies, she pursued legal education at the Ghana Institute of Management and Public Administration (GIMPA) graduating with a Bachelor of Laws (LLB) degree in 2013.

Cynthia proceeded to the Ghana School of Law and was called to the Ghanaian Bar in 2016, which made her qualified to enrol and practice law in Ghana.

== Career ==
Cynthia serves as a District Magistrate in the Judicial Service Of Ghana. She is listed among the professional magistrates of Ghana's District Courts by the Judicial Service.

She serves justice at the District Court in Suhum, located in the Eastern Region. Previously, she presided over the Nsawam District Magistrate Court, where she handled cases involving building permit violations and other regulatory matters.

== Personal life ==
Cynthia Emefa Ohene is currently married with four children.
