= Electronic waste in Africa =

Electrical and electronic equipment (EEE) waste, or e-waste, is illegally brought into African states every year. A minimum of 250,000 metric tons of e-waste comes into the continent, and according to the Swiss Federal Laboratories for Materials Science and Technology, the majority of it in West Africa enters from Europe. Developed countries commodify underdeveloped African states as dumping grounds for their e-waste, and due to poor regulations and a lack of enforcement institutions, illegal dumping is promoted. Currently, the largest e-waste dumping site in Africa is Agbogbloshie in Ghana. While states like Nigeria do not contain e-waste sites as concentrated as Agbogbloshie, they do have several small sites. Agboloshie was demolished in 2021 by the Ghanan government.

Two e-waste regulatory institutions exist in Africa: the Basel Convention and Bamako Convention. Because the former institution perceives e-waste as hazardous, it seeks to circumvent adverse public health outcomes that derive from trading EEE. Informal dumping sites burn hazardous materials, subsequently exposing individuals to toxic fumes, contaminating crop production, etc. In particular, Europe and the UK export e-waste into several African states often as donations or second-hand products. African states themselves produce between ~50 and 85% of their e-waste with the rest being imported from developed nations.

Economically, e-waste can carry high value materials which can lead to financial opportunity for some African states. E-waste materials sourced from Africa amounted to $3.2 billion US dollars in 2019, therefore making trading and repairing them economic pursuits for poorer individuals. As such, global trade of e-waste lends itself to a business-like system in certain African states like Ghana. Extracting raw materials like copper is frequently executed by untrained and informal workers that need protective gear and are near localities where children can be exposed. Several economic, health, and political implications derive from the trade of these materials.

== Production and trade of e-waste ==
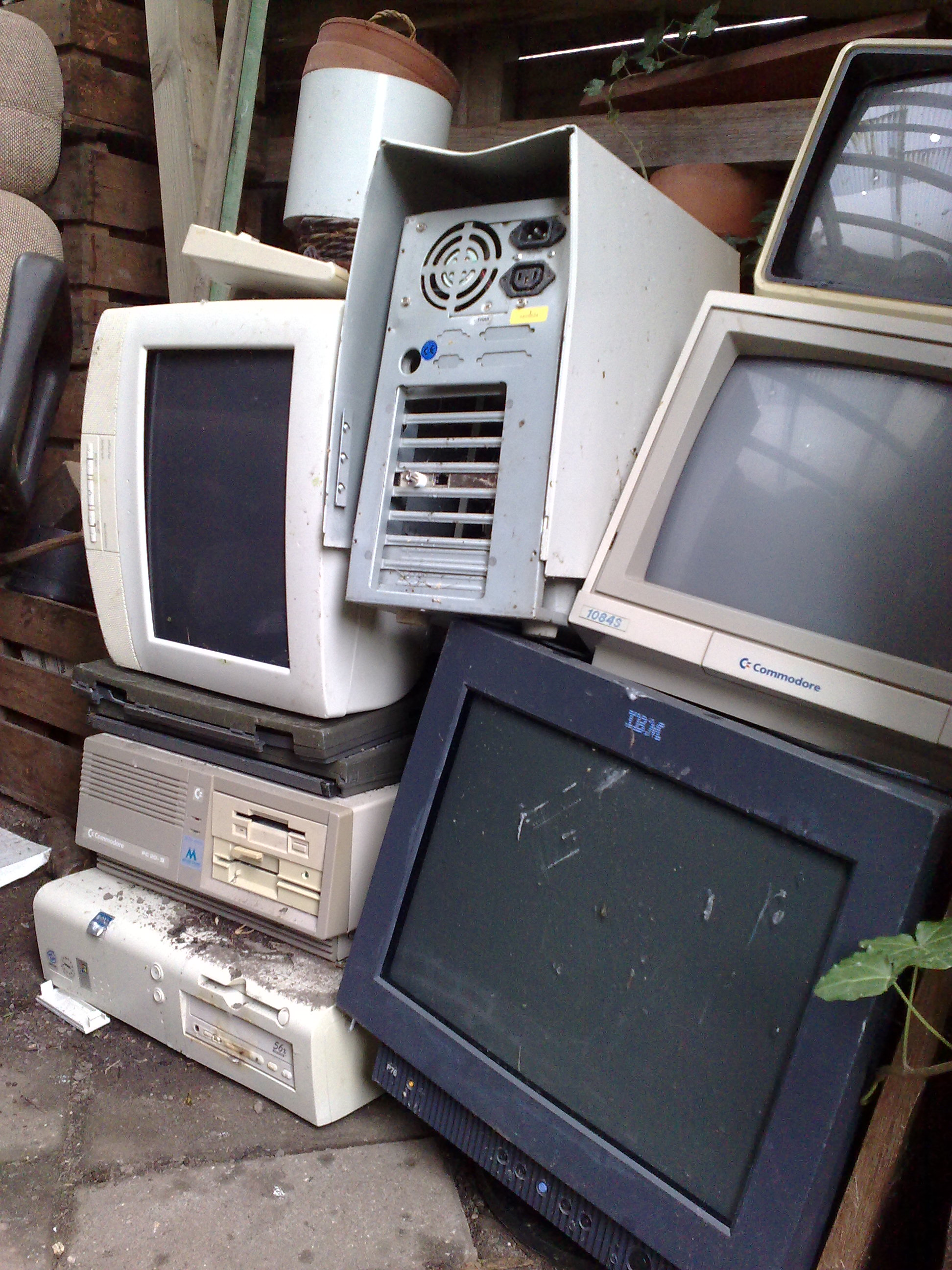
Computers in a waste pile

E-waste is categorized as used EEE including refrigerators, cell phones, and computers.

Africa has seen a significant usage of personal computers and mobile phones in the past decade. The continent produced 2.5 kg per capita of e-waste in 2019, which is the lowest rate in the world. 60% of e-waste is imported into the continent, and it is often processed manually with the intent to resell.

The Port of Lagos in Nigeria is a primary location for importing EEE and its capital, Ikeja, stores obsolete e-waste. The United States and Europe deliver EEE daily to Ikeja's marketplace, and approximately 25 to 75% of it is irreparable. The absence of regulatory agencies in developed countries allows them to export into vulnerable checkpoints in Nigeria, thereby exacerbating the growing amount of e-waste. Simultaneously, according to the United Nations Environment Programme, Ghana and West Africa themselves produces 85 percent of e-waste that ultimately remains in Ghana. The same UN programme determined 215,000 metric tons of EEE were imported into Ghana in 2009, with 15 percent being dumped into the Ghana's Agbogbloshie dump site. More broadly, Ghana, Nigeria, and Tanzania receive e-waste from Europe and the UK.

"Leakage" is used to describe the illegal exportation of waste. The Basel Action Network (BAN) tracked e-waste arriving to recycling centers in ten European countries and discovered 64% of it subsequently being shipped to Africa. Additionally, the BAN identified the UK as the main exporter of EEE to underdeveloped countries. It approximates Europe countries export 352,474 metric tons to developing countries nationally.

== Economic conditions and impacts ==
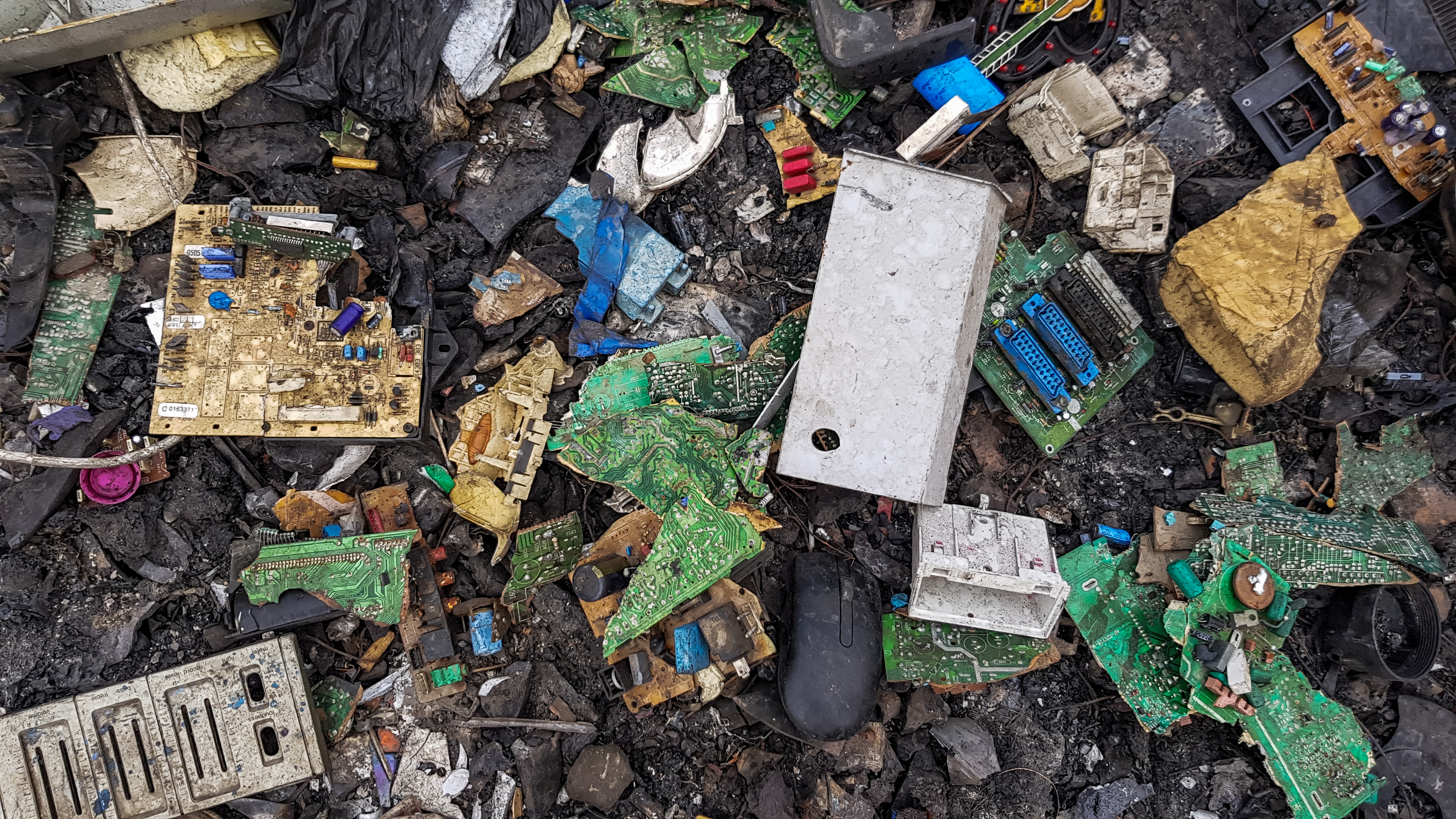
Electronic Waste at Agbogbloshie, Ghana

Gold, copper, and other valuable metals and minerals are sought after in e-waste, and despite the environmental and public health effects, people informally work in dumping sites. Agbogbloshie provides work for an estimated 4500 to 6000 people, and byproducts from e-waste have made it a global business. Roughly USD 105 to 268 million is generated by the market while also benefiting 200,000 people. Also in Ghana, aluminum sourced from e-waste is repurposed to manufacture cooking pots and are then sold in the market.

In Egypt, recycling is a market necessity as second-hand and third-hand products are sought out by users. Within the past 8 years, cell phone and computer purchases increased greater than 20 times. The informal sector of its economy collects and moves e-waste, pulls valuable materials out of it, and sells those materials to recyclers among other consumers. Additional materials can be derived from e-waste and recyclers can barter them to companies. Circuit boards and wires can be burned for copper without state interference. In general, although the waste is dangerous to handle, few workers wear protective gloves, goggles, etc.

== Environmental and human health impacts ==
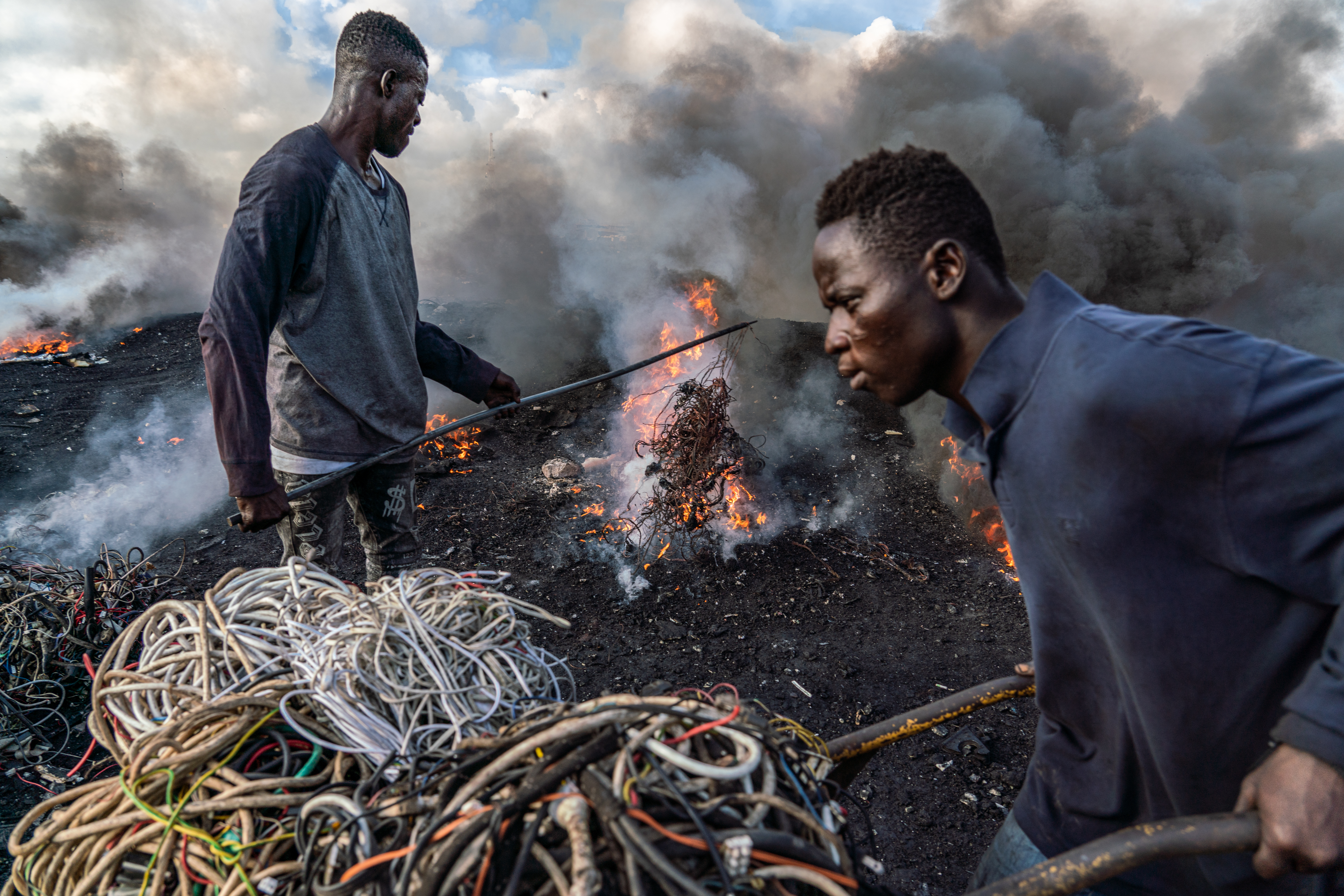
Workers at Agbogbloshie, Ghana

In 2012, a Fieldwork study conducted around Agbogbloshie to assess local concerns about informal e-waste settlements revealed that 96% of respondents perceived a rise in health concerns as a result of the waste settlements and processes. 30% of respondents called into question the breeding of mosquitoes and subsequent rise in malaria risk, while another 40% recalled bodily injury as a result of accidents in the landfills themselves. The burning of e-waste emits toxic particulate matter into the atmosphere from metals and plastics used in devices, cords, circuit boards, etc. Breathing in these toxins often results in respiratory problems for nearby populations. Other symptoms include headaches, skin irritation, gastrointestinal diseases, liver complications, and poisoned fetuses. Chemicals such as mercury, copper, lead, and arsenic leak out of e-waste into soil and water streams, creating an accumulation of harmful chemicals in the ecosystem and its food chains. The expansion of e-waste sites and unsatisfactory waste management practices results in negative impacts on agriculture: space becomes limited for grazing animals and crop production potential.

== Local interaction ==
A 2021 survey of 216 students conducted at Lupane State University in Zimbabwe reveals that 97% of students were unaware of national e-waste recycling procedures, and almost 64% admitted to disposing of EEE with municipal waste, though aware of its negative health impacts. In Zimbabwe, improper management of e-waste is acknowledged by local populations as a problem, but there are no known efforts to mandate proper management procedures.

== Known dumping site ==
- Olusosun landfill

=== E-waste management in Lagos ===
Ghana is among the world's leading countries for electronic waste. Despite bans on importing hazardous waste found in international agreements like the Basel Convention, the Minamata Convention on Mercury, and the Stockholm Convention, fairly relaxed customs systems allow e-waste to travel into Nigeria. Every year, this amounts to approximately 71,000 tonnes of electronic waste imported. United Nations Environment Programme (UNEP) has partnered with Nigeria's National Environmental Standards and Regulations Enforcement Agency to implement a sustainable model for e-waste recycling in order to prevent overflowing landfills. However, scrapping and reselling makes up a large part of how e-waste is managed in the country. Despite hazardous conditions, such as infections and neuro developmental issues, and laws against metal extraction methods, such as burning plastic cables and acid leaching, local civilians run a large informal sector of recycling that is favored by international entities for its evasion of production cost, regulation, and taxation.A 2025 review identified inadequate recycling infrastructure,limited public awareness,and gaps in regulation as major challenges to sustainable electronic waste management in Nigeria.

In 1977, following an oil boom and subsequent influx of migrants, the city of Lagos founded the Lagos Waste Management Authority (LAWMA), formerly known as Lagos State Refuse Disposal Board (LSRDB). The poorly managed waste management systems in the 1970s necessitated the establishment of a state-funded institution to monitor waste practices and health implications. It is demolished in 2021 by the Nigerian government.

=== E-waste management in Accra ===
Sub-Saharan African cities, like the capital of Ghana (i.e., Accra) have a deficit of public health infrastructure, including sanitation services and waste management. Despite the Agbogbloshie Scrap Dealers Association (ASDA) showing evidence of how workers can be harmed at the dumping site, workers are defiant to banning it due to employment opportunities. Accra's municipal government, the Accra Metropolitan Assembly, are privy to the site's health and environmental risks, but are not proactive about the problems.

Electronic connectors can contain metals including copper, silver, and gold, which is why workers are incentivized to recycle. However, extracting these metals calls for professional expertise and equipment, which workers tend to not possess. One method workers use to remove copper from rubber objects is through burning, which yields harmful smoke. It has been suggested, through blood samples, that workers heavy metals and other materials concentrated at high levels in their blood stream, in addition to carcinogens. Apart from the actual site's atmosphere being permeated by toxic fumes, people in nearby areas, like the Old Fadama and those working in the business district, are prone to exposure.

==== E-waste processing in Haatso, Accra ====
Environment Minister Ophelia Mensah-Hayford inaugurated the facility, which aims to provide a safe disposal point for discarded electronic items. The center is expected to help combat the environmental hazards posed by improper disposal of electronic waste, a growing concern in Ghana's urban areas. This new facility, situated in the Haatso is part of the government's broader strategy to improve environmental protection and waste management.
