= Ayensuano District =

Former District in the Eastern Region of Ghana

- Former District
- Districts of Eastern Region

- Location of Ayensuano District within Eastern
- Coordinates: 5°54′28.8″N 0°28′8.4″W
- Country: Ghana
- Region: Eastern
- Capital: Coaltar

Population (2021)
  - Total: 94,594
- Time zone: UTC+0 (GMT)

Ayensuano District is one of the thirty-three districts in Eastern Region, Ghana. Originally it was formerly part of the then-larger Suhum-Kraboa-Coaltar District in 1988, which was created from the former Suhum-Kraboa-Coaltar District Council, until the southern part of the district was split off to create Ayensuano (district) on 28 June 2012; thus the remaining part has been renamed as Suhum Municipal District, which it was also elevated into municipal district assembly status on that same year. The district assembly is located in the southern part of Eastern Region and has Coaltar as its capital town. The population of the district as at December 2024 stood at 98,300.

== Political representation ==
The district has one constituency by the same name, Ayensuano which has twenty seven (27) electoral areas. The district is divided into three zones, Obesua Zone, Anum Apapam Zone and Kraboa-Coaltar Zone.

== External Sources ==
- "Districts of Ghana". Statoids.
- About Ayensuano District Assembly
