= Coaltar =

- District Capital
- Location in Ghana
- Coordinates: 5°54′31″N 0°27′45″W
- Country: Ghana
- Region: Eastern Region
- Districts: Ayensuano

Government
  - District Chief Executive: Josephine Awuku Ansaa Inkoom
- Elevation: 252 m (827 ft)
- Time zone: GMT
  - Summer (DST): GMT
- Ghana Post GPS: EO
- Telephone numbering plan: +233 34 25

Coaltar is the capital of the Ayensuano in the Eastern Region of Ghana. Coaltar used to be in the Suhum/Kraboa/Coaltar District until 2012 when the district was split into the Suhum Municipal District and the Ayensuano districts. Following this, Coaltar became the district capital. As at 2021, the District Chief Executive is Josephine Inkoom.

== Location ==
Coaltar is to the northwest of Nsawam, capital of the Nsawam Adoagyire District. To the west is Asamankese, capital of the West Akim Municipal District and to the south is Adeiso, capital of the Upper West Akim District.

== See also ==
- Ayensuano (district)
- Ayensuano (Ghana parliament constituency)
