= Ida Adjoa Asiedu =

Ghanaian politician

Hon. MP Ida Adjoa Asiedu

Member of Parliament for Ayensuano (Ghana parliament constituency)
- Incumbent
- Assumed office January 7, 2025
- Preceded by: Teddy Safori Addi

Personal details
- Born: April 27, 1982 (age 44) Koforidua, Ghana
- Party: New Patriotic Party
- Education: Atlantic International University
- Occupation: Politician, Businesswoman
- Nickname: Ida

Ida Adjoa Asiedu (born April 27, 1982) is a Ghanaian politician, businesswoman and member of the New Patriotic Party (NPP). She is the member of Parliament for Ayensuano (Ghana parliament constituency) in the Eastern Region. She represents the constituency in the Ninth Parliament of the Fourth Republic of Ghana.

Ida is a businesswoman who once contested and lost to the former member of parliament, Samuel Ayeh-Paye, during the primaries of the New Patriotic party in 2020.

She is the first female MP for the Ayensuano (Ghana parliament constituency) since its inception.

== Early life and education ==
Ida hails from Koforidua in the Eastern region of Ghana. She holds a BSc from the Atlantic International University in the United States.

== Political life ==
In January 2024, she contested and won the NPP parliamentary primaries for Ayensuano (Ghana parliament constituency) in the Eastern Region of Ghana.

She subsequently won the parliamentary elections to unseat the then incumbent, Teddy Safori Addi in the 2024 Ghanaian general election with 18,299 representing 50.26% of total votes to become part of the ninth parliament of the fourth Republic of Ghana.
