= Godfred Kwame Otsere =

Ghanaian politician

Hon. Godfred Kwame Otsere

Member of Parliament for Ayensuano Constituency
- In office 7 January 2001 – 6 January 2005
- President: John Kufuor
- Preceded by: Evans Kodjo Ahorsey
- In office 7 January 2005 – 6 January 2009
- Succeeded by: Samuel Ayeh-Paye

Personal details
- Born: 22 November 1941 (age 84)
- Party: New Patriotic Party
- Profession: Politician

Godfred Kwame Otsere is a Ghanaian politician and was a former member of parliament for the Ayensuano Constituency in the Eastern region of Ghana in the 3rd and 4th parliaments of the 4th republic of Ghana.

== Career ==
He is a Ghanaian politician.

== Politics ==
He was a member of the New Patriotic Party. He was elected as the member of parliament for the Ayensuano constituency in the 2000 and 2004 Ghanaian general elections. He oust Evans Kodjo Ahorsey of the National Democratic Congress to represent the constituency in the 3rd parliament of the 4th republic from 7 January 2001 to 6 January 2005. He maintained his seat for another term by winning in the 2004 Ghanaian general elections. In the 2008 Ghanaian general elections though he lost his seat to Samuel Ayeh-Paye also of the New Patriotic Party.

=== 2000 Elections ===
In the year 2000, Otsere won the general elections as the member of parliament for the Ayensuano constituency of the Eastern Region of Ghana.He won on the ticket of the New Patriotic Party. His constituency was a part of the 18 parliamentary seats out of 26 seats won by the New Patriotic Party in that election for the Eastern Region.The New Patriotic Party won a majority total of 99 parliamentary seats out of 200 seats. Otsere was elected with 12,618 votes respectively. This was equivalent to 51.40% of the total valid votes cast. He was elected over Evans Kodjo Ahorsey of the National Democratic Congress, Samuel Nartey of the Convention People's Party and Evans Oheneaku Asamaning of the United Ghana Movement. These won 10,200,1,096 and 657 votes out of the total valid votes cast respectively. These were equivalent to the following percentages; 41.50%, 4.50% and 2.70% respectively of total valid votes cast.

=== 2004 General Elections ===
Mr. Otsere won the NPP primaries to contest for the parliamentary seat in Ayensuano constituency in the Suhum-Kraboa-Coaltar district. That was his third time running. He won by 17,636votes of the 31,090 total valid votes cast which is 56.70%. He was elected over Francis Asare of the National Democratic Congress and Samuel Andrews Donkor of the Convention People's Party. These obtained 12,683votes and 771votes respectively of the total valid votes cast. These were equivalent to 40.8% and 2.5% respectively of the total valid votes cast. His constituency was a part of the 22 constituencies won by the New Patriotic Party in the Eastern region in that elections. In all, the New Patriotic Party won a total 128 parliamentary seats in the 4th parliament of the 4th republic of Ghana.
