= Evans Kodjo Ahorsey =

Ghanaian politician

Mp for Ayensuano Constituency
- In office 7 January 1997 – 6 January 2001
- President: Jerry John Rawlings

Evans Kodjo Ahorsey is a Ghanaian politician and member of the Ghana Parliament that represented Ayensuano Constituency in the Eastern Region of Ghana.

== Political career ==
Evans contested for the office of the member of parliament to represent Ayensuano Constituency in the 1996 Ghanaian general elections with the ticket of the NDC. He contested against Ebenezer Akrong Okai of the NPP who had 7,528 votes, Francis Asare of the IND who had 5,956 votes, Elizabeth Kusi Aidoo of the Convention People's Party who had 1978 votes and Prince Yaw Yorke Yeboah of the NPP who had 359 votes. Evans had the highest vote count of 13,241 votes which is equivalent to 37.10% of the total vote which saw him win the contest. Evans contested for re election in the 2000 Ghanaian general election and had 10,200 votes but was not able to beat Godfred Otchere of the NPP who had 12,618 of the total votes. Other contestants are Samuel Nartey of the CPP and Evans Oheneaku Asamaning of the UGM. He was succeeded by Godfred Otchere of the New Patriotic Party.
