= Margaret Ansei =

Ghanaian businessperson and politician

Margaret "Magoo" Ansei is a Ghanaian businessperson and politician. She is the chief executive officer of the Ghana Enterprises Agency (GEA), appointed by President John Mahama in January 2025 and became the second woman to head the agency.

== Early life and education ==
Margaret Ansei was born in Suhum in the Eastern Region of Ghana to Mr. Daniel Ansei(late) and Miss Comfort Owusu. She completed her secondary school education at Oforipanin Senior High School in the Eastern Region. She holds a bachelor's degree in business administration from the University of Professional Studies, a master's degree in international trade from the Anhalt University of Applied Sciences in Germany. She also holds a master of arts degree in public relations from the University of Media, Arts and Communication and is pursuing a doctorate at the Kwame Nkrumah University of Science and Technology.

== Political career ==
Margaret Ansei is an active communication member of the ruling National Democratic Congress. In 2022, she contested to become the National Women's Organiser of the party but lost to former Member of Parliament Hanna Louisa Bissiw.

Ansei was appointed Ashanti regional coordinator for the Local Enterprise Skills Development Program (LESDEP) by President John Mahama during his first term in office. She became municipal CEO for the Suhum Municipal District in 2016.

== CEO of GEA ==
In January 2025, Ansei was appointed by John Mahama as chief executive officer of the Ghana Enterprises Agency.
