= Agbogbloshie =

District of Accra, Ghana, known for e-waste dump issues

- Town
- Location of Agbogbloshie, Ghana in the Greater Accra Region
- Coordinates: 05°32′42.0″N 00°13′30″W
- Country: Ghana
- Region: Greater Accra Region
- District: Korle-Klottey Municipal District
- Time zone: UTC0 (GMT)

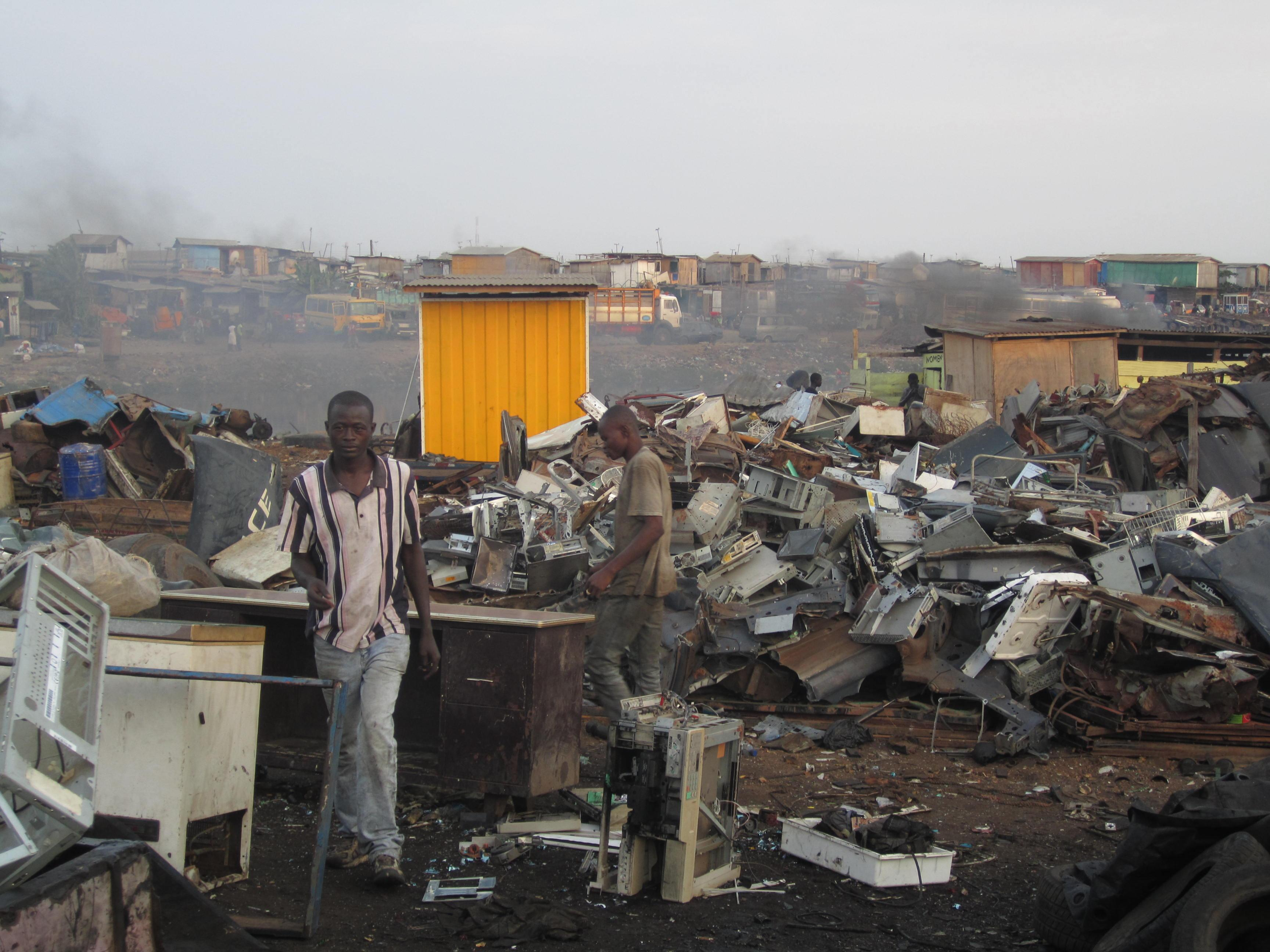
Ghanaians working in Agbogbloshie

Agbogbloshie is the nickname of a commercial district on the Korle Lagoon of the Odaw River, near the center of Accra, Ghana's capital city. Close to the slum called "Old Fadama", the Agbogbloshie site has become known as a destination for externally generated automobile and electronic scrap collected mostly from the Western world. It is a center of a legal and illegal exportation network for the environmental dumping of electronic waste from industrialized nations. The Basel Action Network, a charitable non-governmental organization based in Seattle, has referred to Agbogbloshie as a "digital dumping ground", where millions of tons of e-waste are processed each year. Roughly 40,000 Ghanaians inhabit the area, most of whom are migrants from rural areas. Due to its harsh living conditions and rampant crime, the area has been nicknamed "Sodom and Gomorrah".

The Basel Convention prevents the cross-border shipment of hazardous waste from developed to less developed countries. However, under Annex Ix, B1110, the convention specifically allows export for reuse and repair. While numerous international press reports have made reference to allegations that the majority of exports to Ghana are dumped, research by the US International Trade Commission found little evidence of unprocessed e-waste being shipped to Africa from the United States.

Whether domestically generated by residents of Ghana or imported, concerns have remained over the methods of waste processing—especially burning—which releases toxic chemicals into the air, land, and water. Exposure is especially hazardous to children, because those toxins are known to inhibit the development of the reproductive system, the nervous system, and, especially, the brain. Concerns about human health and the environment of Agbogbloshie continue to be raised, because the area is heavily polluted.

In the 2000s, the Ghanaian government, with new funding and loans, implemented the Korle Lagoon Ecological Restoration Project, an environmental remediation and restoration project that was designed to deal with the pollution problem by dredging the lagoon and Odaw canal to improve drainage and the outfall into the ocean.

== Background ==
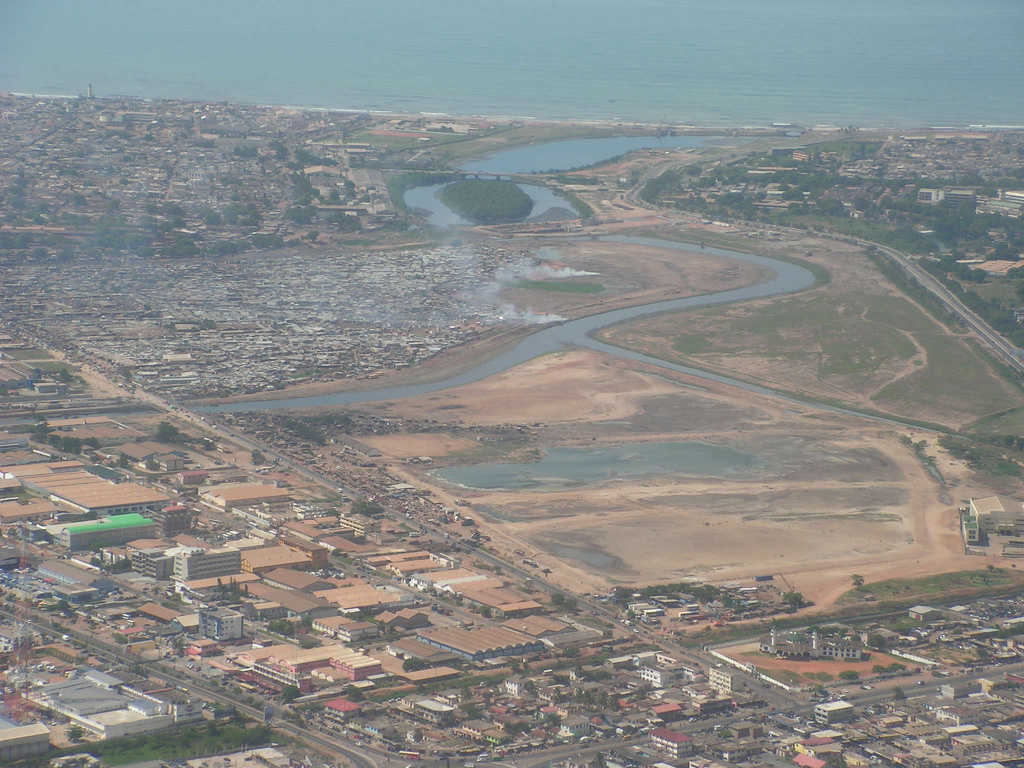
Korle Lagoon, in Ghana's capital city of Accra

In the 1960s, the area of present-day Agbogbloshie was a wetland. As the city of Accra urbanized, a ghetto grew, referred to as Old Fadama or Ayaalolo. During the 1980s, the ghetto was a place of shelter for refugees from the Konkomba-Nanumba war. In the late 1990s, newly available electricity from the Akosombo Dam led to increased local demand for electric and electronic appliances.

The electricity from the Akosombo Dam increased demand for functional secondhand televisions and computers, which were imported from the West by Africa's technology sector, to help "bridge the digital divide". Ghanaians welcomed the donations, because the computers cost one-tenth the price of new ones. The Basel Action Network (BAN) circulated a claim in 2008 that as many as 75 percent of the secondhand electronic equipment sent to Africa could not be reused and ended up in landfills instead.

The BAN allegation was slightly different from its 2002 claim of 80% waste, which became one of the most cited references in academic journals, though no documentation or peer-reviewed source was made available.

== Economy ==
Unemployed migrants to Accra take part in scrap metal collection, including automotive scrap, to supplement their incomes. A 2018 report stated that each month, an estimated 300 to 600 40-foot-long containers of e-waste shipments reached the ports of Ghana, largely from the United States, France, Germany, South Korea, Switzerland, and the Netherlands. Upwards of 85 per cent of electronics and electrical parts imported into Ghana are from the EU, and a large proportion is dumped as e-waste after entering the country. Multinational brands such as Philips, Canon, Dell, Microsoft, Nokia, Siemens, and Sony are commonly found throughout the waste. According to e-waste assessment studies, "Refurbishing of EEE [electrical and electronic equipment] and the sales of used EEE is an important economic sector. It is a well-organized and a dynamic sector that holds the potential for further industrial development. Indirectly, the sector has another important economic role, as it supplies low and middle income households with affordable ICT equipment and other EEE."

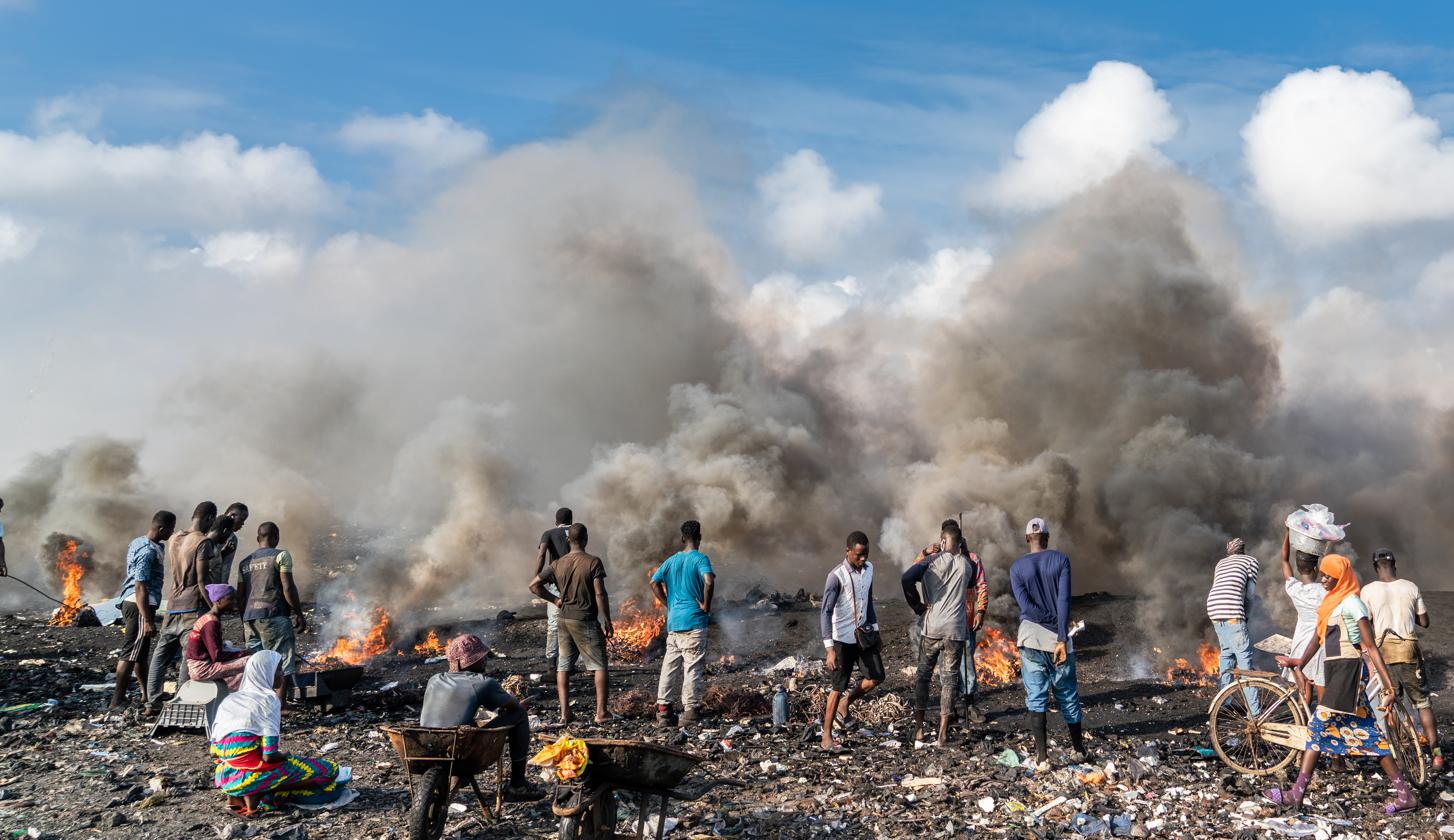
Young men burning electrical wires to recover copper at Agbogbloshie, September 2019

In 2008, followers of BAN alleged that non-governmental (NGO) organizations are adding to the waste when excess electronics are donated, with the intention of helping scholarly institutions. They claimed, based on the 75%–80% orphaned waste statistic, that exporters must have found numerous loopholes to avoid legislation forbidding e-waste shipping, such as labeling broken electronics as 'end-of-life' or 'second-hand-goods', falsely identifying them as in working order.

Workers, children and adults alike, disassemble cars, appliances, and scrap electronics, gathered in wheeled push carts from Accra neighborhoods. The revenue from the recovery of metals such as copper, aluminium, and iron is very small, however. According to a 2011 report, half a sack of copper or aluminium sold for about ₵700, amounting to about ₵8–10 Ghana cedis per day (US$4–6).

The informal e-waste recycling industry is highly hierarchical, with burners, collectors, and dismantlers, often the entry point for young people, representing the "lowest" class. Developing enough knowledge, networking, and capital can allow people to attain higher ranks. The Greater Accra Scrap Dealers Association, a group formed by the workers themselves, has established certain rules and regulations and even cooperated with the National Youth Authority, a governmental organization.

== Living conditions ==
The population of Agbogbloshie consists of economic migrants from northern and rural parts of Ghana, where living standards are worse, causing people to move to urban settings, such as Agbogbloshie. Inhabitants of Agbogbloshie live, eat, and work on the land and in the midst the waste. School-age children often spend their evenings and weekends processing waste and searching for metals.

Dwellings consist of wooden shacks that lack water and sanitation. The area is also home to armed robbers, prostitutes, drug dealers, and underground markets. Crime and disease are rampant throughout Agbogbloshie, creating a difficult living environment. Due to its harsh living conditions, outsiders have nicknamed the area "Sodom and Gomorrah", after the two condemned biblical cities.

== Pollution ==
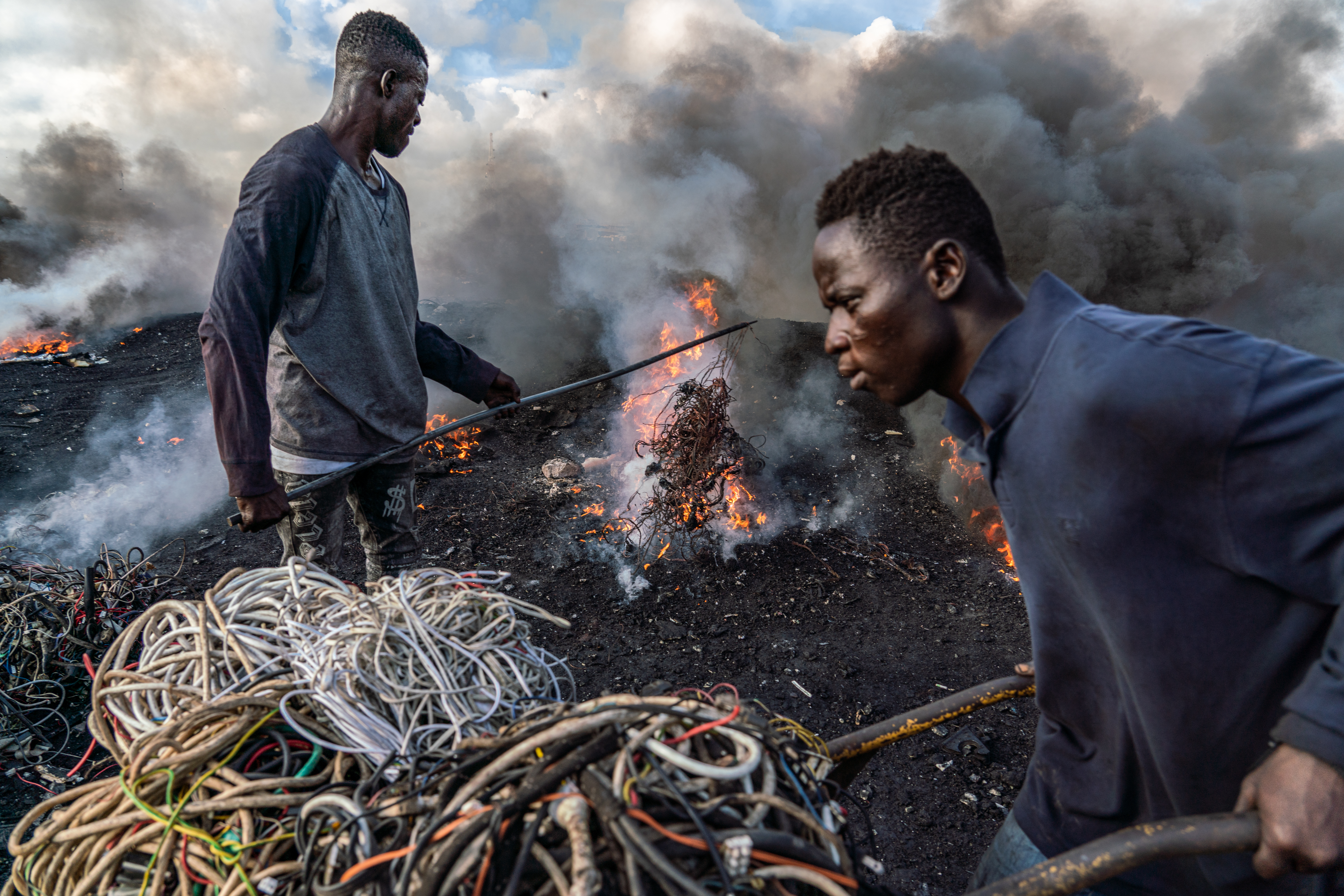
A young man burning electrical wires to recover copper at Agbogbloshie, September 2019

The dumping and processing of electronic waste in Agbogbloshie has severely contaminated the air, land, and water in the entire area. Poisons such as lead, mercury, arsenic, dioxins, furans, and brominated flame retardants seep into the surrounding soil and water, severely polluting the landscape. 2010 Greenpeace laboratory tests showed that water and soil from areas in Agbogbloshie had concentrations of chemicals at levels over a hundred times greater than what is considered safe.

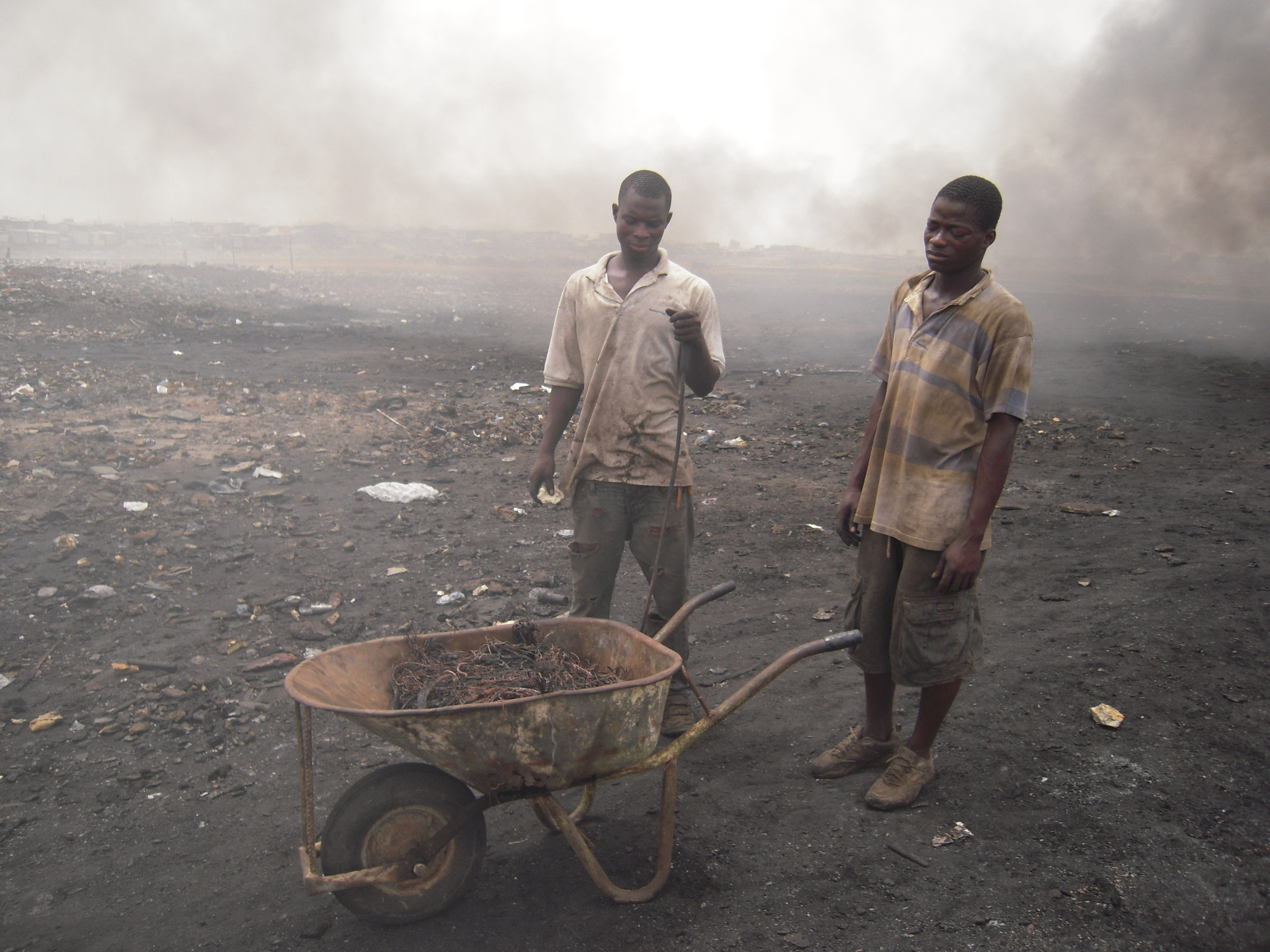
Agbogbloshie e-waste workers completing a burn for copper recovery

Several studies have confirmed high levels of lead in the soil, with particular risks to workers and children. Environmental lead contamination was predominantly due to burning the plastic covering of copper wires. PVC electrical insulation contains approximately 3,000 mg/kg of lead, used as a stiffener and ultraviolet inhibitor, which is released during burning.

Concentrations of several other toxic chemicals regularly exceed acceptable levels set by Japanese, German, or American governments.

In April 2019, The Guardian reported that a study for IPEN and the Basel Action Network found dangerous levels of dioxins and polychlorinated biphenyls in chicken eggs in Agbogbloshie. A study published by Arnika and IPEN revealed that eggs from backyard farming in Agbogbloshie contained very high concentrations of other persistent organic pollutants, specifically short-chain chlorinated paraffins, brominated dioxins, hexachlorobenzene, and polybrominated diphenyl ethers. One egg from a free-range chicken in the area was tested and found to have 220 times the amount of chlorinated dioxins (which can cause cancer and damage the immune system) that the European Food Safety Authority considers safe to consume. Because of that, nearly 80,000 inhabitants living either in or near the Agbogbloshie slum are affected by the toxins in their food.

The Korle Lagoon, on which Agbogbloshie is situated, has extremely low levels of dissolved oxygen, a result of the large and uncontrolled quantities of domestic and industrial waste being released into the water. Studies have indicated that the entrance to the lagoon is severely polluted and not suitable for physical contact, due to the large amount of bacteria present.

== Health risks ==
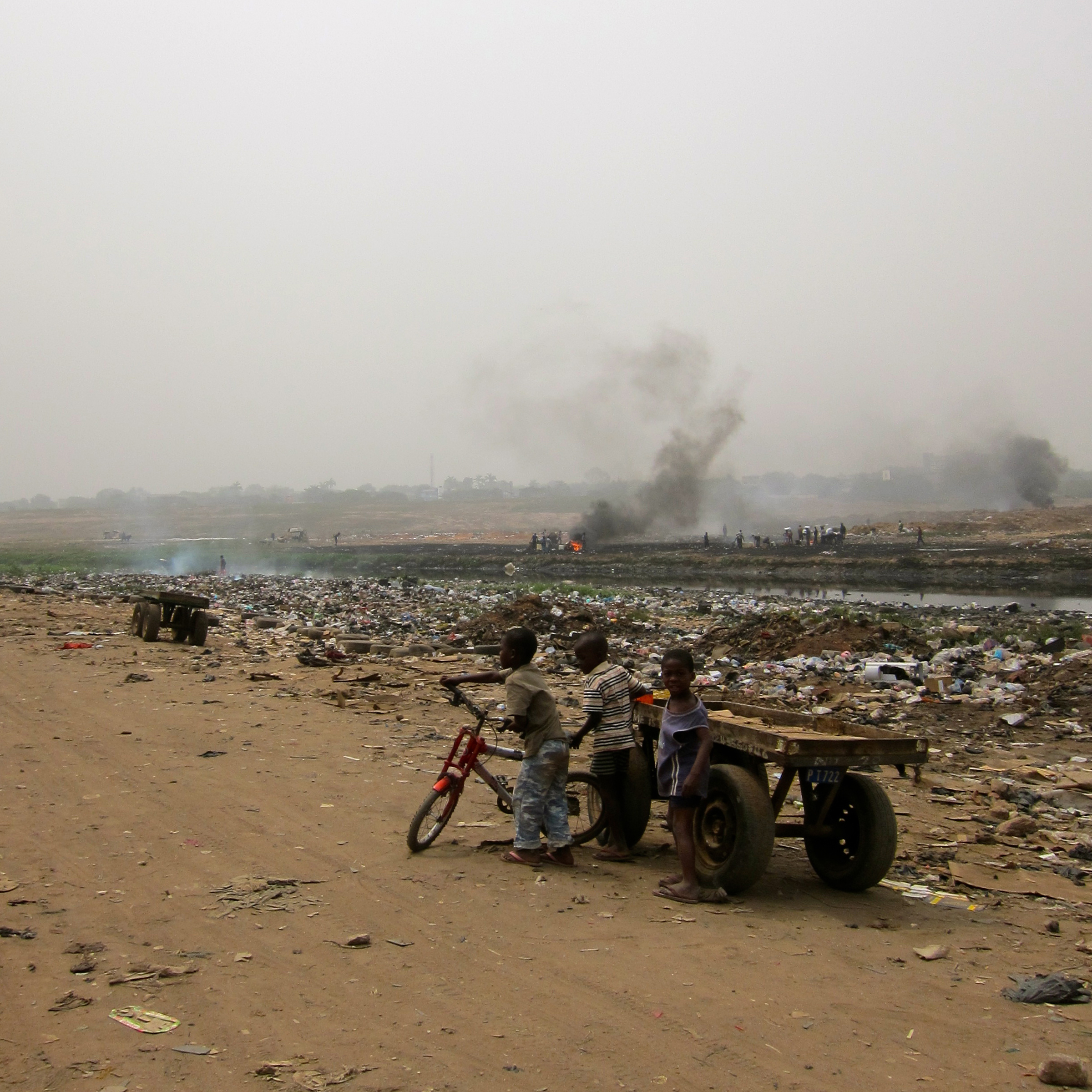
Pollution from the e-waste industry at Agbogbloshie is extensive.

Processing electronic waste presents a serious health threat to workers at Agbogbloshie. The fumes released from the burning of the plastics and metals are composed of highly toxic chemicals and carcinogens. Workers often inhale lead, cadmium, dioxins, furans, phthalates, and brominated flame retardants.

Exposure to fumes is especially hazardous to children, because the toxins are known to inhibit the development of the reproductive system, the nervous system, and the brain. In similar e-waste processing areas, with conditions and demographics like those of Agbogbloshie, 80% of children have dangerous levels of lead in their blood. Inhabitants often suffer from chronic nausea, headaches, and respiratory problems.

High levels of toxins have also been discovered in soil and food samples, as chemicals stay in the food chain.

There is evidence that, because they lack critical relevant education, workers possess little awareness of the hazards associated with informal e-waste processing, and some attribute their health issues to other sources, such as malaria or sun exposure.

== Information security ==
E-waste presents a potential security threat to individuals and exporting countries. Hard drives that are not properly erased before a computer is disposed of can be reopened, exposing sensitive information. Credit card numbers, private financial data, account information, and records of online transactions can be accessed by those with the necessary knowledge. Organized criminals in Ghana commonly search the drives for information to use in local scams.

Government contracts have been discovered on hard drives found in Agbogbloshie. Multimillion-dollar agreements from United States security institutions, such as the Defense Intelligence Agency, the Transportation Security Administration, and Homeland Security, all resurfaced in Agbogbloshie.

== Restoration efforts ==
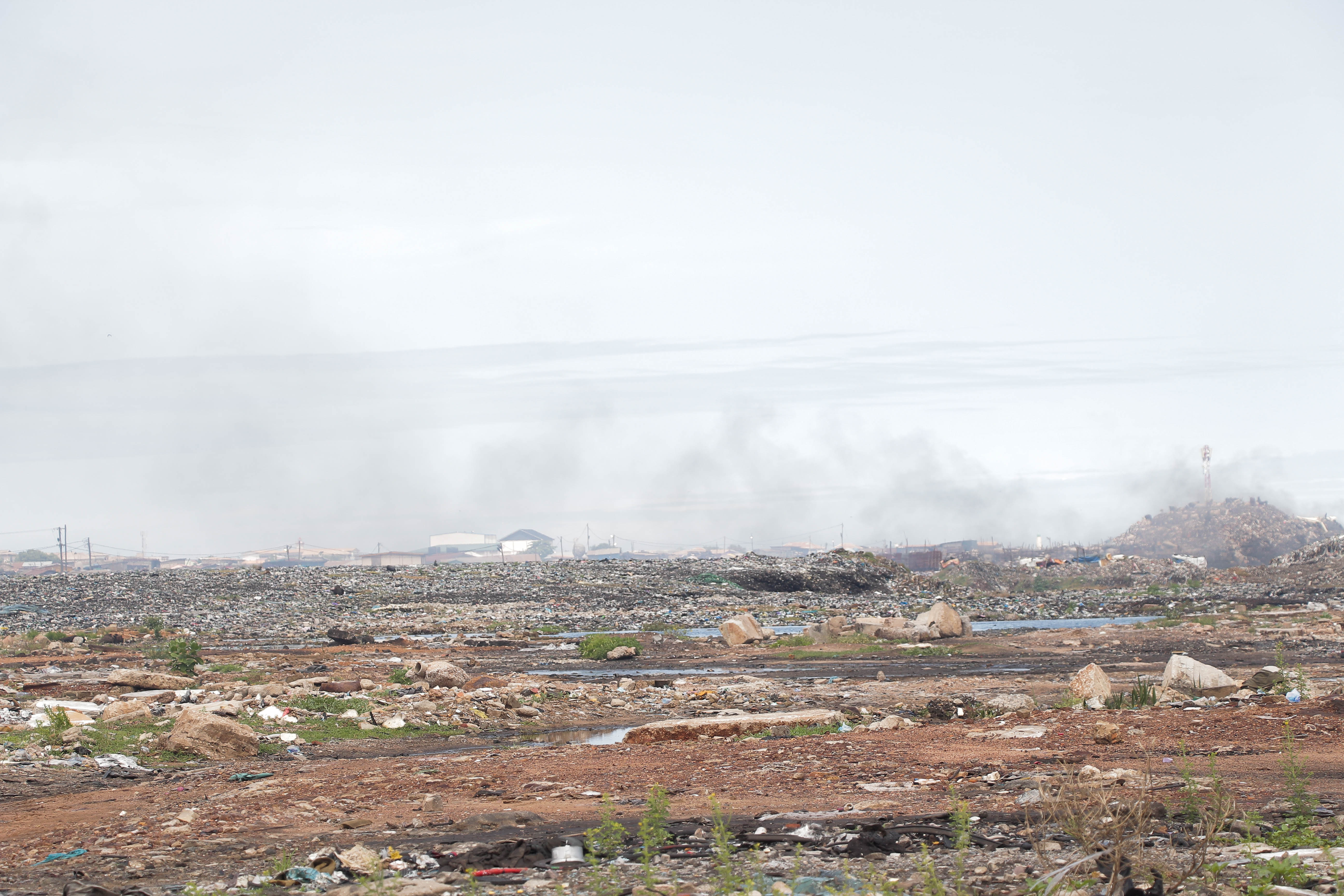
A large refuse area causing a sanitation crisis being cleared by authorities for construction. Smoke can be seen at the far end.

The Ghanaian government has made an effort to restore the area through the Korle Lagoon Ecological Restoration Project (KLERP). In 2003, the OPEC Fund for International Development, the Arab Bank for Economic Development in Africa, and the Kuwait Fund for Arab Economic Development provided a loan for the project, with the expectation that the Ghanaian government would dredge the lagoon and restore its surroundings. Other goals of the project included a reduction in flooding, an increase in marine life, an improvement of water quality, and an enhancement in general sanitary conditions.

Due to the invasive nature of the project, the restoration efforts were opposed by the inhabitants of Agbogbloshie. KLERP required people to leave the area, which was the only home for a majority of squatters. The Accra Metropolitan Assembly continually tried to evict people but were met with a great deal of resistance.

In 2014, the NGO Pure Earth funded the creation of a copper wire recycling center within Agbogbloshie and helped install several automated machines to simplify the removal of plastic coating from wires and reduce burning. The efforts appeared to be moderately successful, but burning continued.

From 2017, the German government supported Ghana in introducing sustainable e-waste management. An e-waste programme was implemented by Deutsche Gesellschaft für Internationale Zusammenarbeit, in partnership with the Ghanaian Ministry of Environment Science Technology and Innovation. In 2019, a training facility, a health clinic, and a football pitch were provided.

== Attempted demolition ==
In July 2021, the Ghanaian government attempted to demolish and clear the Agbogbloshie settlement and recycling site, but scrap workers returned to the area following President John Mahama's inauguration in 2025.

== In popular culture ==
- The official video of Placebo's cover of Talk Talk's song "Life's What You Make It" starts with the line "This film is dedicated to the workers of Agbogbloshie" and ends with "When you get rid of your cellphone, computer and home appliances, your cast-offs often go on a voyage across the oceans to Agbogbloshie. Agbogbloshie is a former wetland, which is now home to one of the world's largest electronic waste dumps. Here, young men and boys smash and burn electronic devices to salvage the metals inside them". The whole video was shot on site at Agbogbloshie.

== See also ==
- Guiyu, Guangdong, an electronic waste site in China
