= Kwasi Opoku-Amankwa =

Kwasi Opoku-Amankwa is the director-general of the Ghana Education Service and an associate professor.

Prior to his director-general appointment, he was the dean of the International Programmes Office (IPO) at Kwame Nkrumah University of Science And Technology (KNUST).

== Early life and education ==
He attended Suhum Secondary Technical School, then went to Wesley College in Kumasi for his professional post-secondary teacher certificate. His first degree in Social Sciences was from Kwame Nkrumah University Of Science And Technology (KNUST). He subsequently received a Master of Arts and Graduate Diploma in Communication Studies from the University of Ghana. His PhD was on language and education from the University of Reading in the UK.
