= Frederick Opare-Ansah =

Ghanaian politician and electrical engineer

Hon. Frederick Opare-Ansah

Member of Parliament for Suhum Constituency
- In office 7 January 2005 – 6 January 2021
- Preceded by: Ransford Agyapong
- Succeeded by: Kwadjo Asante

Deputy Minister for Communications (Ghana)
- In office 2005 – 6 January 2009

Personal details
- Born: 5 September 1968 (age 58)
- Party: New Patriotic Party
- Education: Nkawkaw Senior High School, Kwame Nkrumah University of Science and Technology
- Profession: Engineer
- Committees: Communications Committee, Public Accounts Committee and Finance and Business Committee

Frederick Opare-Ansah (born September 5, 1968) is an Electrical Engineer and Ghanaian politician who was a member of the Fourth to Seventh Parliament of the Fourth Republic of Ghana representing the peole of Suhum Constituency in the Eastern Region on the ticket of the New Patriotic Party (NPP).

== Early life and education ==
Opare-Ansah was born on September 5, 1958. He hails from Amankokrom-Akuapem, a town in the Eastern Region of Ghana. He graduated from Kwame Nkrumah University of Science and Technology and obtained his Bachelor of Science degree in electrical engineering in 1994.

== Employment ==
Opare-Ansah worked as the managing director of Third Rail (Ghana) Limited. He is an Engineer by profession.

== Political career ==
Opare-Ansah is a member of the New Patriotic Party (NPP). He is a member of the 4th, 5th, 6th and 7th Parliaments of the 4th Republic of Ghana. He first became a member of the Parliament of Ghana, representing Suhum (Ghana parliament constituency) in January 2005 after emerging winner of his constituency polls in the 2004 Ghanaian general election in December.

He had run for 4 consecutive terms in office and represented his constituency in the 7th Parliament of Ghana. where he was the Chairperson of the Communications committee and was also a member of the committees on Finance and Business. In the 5th parliament of the 4th parliament of Ghana, he was the Minority Chief Whip. He was also a deputy minister for communication during President John Agyekum Kuffour's tenure from 2005-2008.

After losing his bid to become the general secretary of the New Patriotic Party in July 2022, he was appointed by the flagbearer and current vice president of Ghana, Mahamudu Bawumia as the campaign manager.

== Elections ==
Opare-Ansah represented the Suhum constituency as the Member of Parliament for the 5th parliament of the 4th republic of Ghana. He was elected on the ticket of the New Patriotic Party by obtaining 17,461 votes out of the 38,577 total valid votes cast, equivalent to 45.3% of total valid votes cast. He was elected over Jacob Kwaku Arkoh of the People's National Convention, Samuel Fleischer Kwabi of the National Democratic Congress, Francis Darby Kobena Inkoom of the Convention People's Party, Matilda Garbrah an independent candidate. These obtained 0.75%, 41.02%, 0.77% and 12.20% respectively of total valid votes cast.

He lost the New Patriotic Party parliamentary elections in 2021 to Kwadjo Asante with 272 votes out of 666 votes cast.

In March 2022, he declared his intention to run for the general secretary position of the New Patriotic Party. He however, polled 50 votes and lost the elections in July 2022 to Justin Koduah.

== Personal life ==
Opare-Ansah is a Christian. He is married.
