= Suhum Municipal District =

Suhum
- Municipal District
- Suhum Municipal District
- Districts of Eastern Region

- Location of Suhum Municipal District within Eastern
- Coordinates: 6°2′3.84″N 0°27′8.64″W
- Country: Ghana
- Region: Eastern
- Capital: Suhum

Government
  - Municipal Chief Executive: Lydia Ohenewaa

Area
  - Land: 359 km^{2} (139 sq mi)

Population (2021)
  - Total: 126,403
- Time zone: UTC+0 (GMT)

Suhum Municipal Assembly is one of the thirty-three districts in the Eastern Region, Ghana. Originally, it was formerly part of the then-larger Suhum-Kraboa-Coaltar District in 1988, which was created from the former Suhum-Kraboa-Coaltar District Council, until the southern part of the district was split off to create Ayensuano District on 28 June 2012; thus, the remaining part has been renamed as Suhum Municipal Assembly, which was also elevated into municipal district assembly status in that same year. The municipality is located in the southern part of the Eastern Region and has Suhum as its capital town. The population of the Suhum Municipal Assembly as of December 2024 is 123,100.

The Chief Executive Officer of Suhum as of January 7, 2025, was Margaret Darko. The current Municipal Chief Executive is Hon. Lydia Ohenewaa.

== Boundaries ==
The Suhum Municipal District is one of the 261 districts in Ghana's parliament. The Suhum Municipality is located in the south-central part of the Eastern Region of Ghana and covers a land area of about three hundred and fifty-eight square kilometres (358km2). It shares common boundaries with Ayensuano District in the south-west, Akuapem North in the South-east, New Juaben North in the North-east and Akim Abuakwa South in the North-west.

== List of chief executives ==
Name	Tenure Year	Political party
Ralph Seth-Biam	1990	PNDC
Micahel Kofi Mensah	2000 - 2008	New Patriotic Party
Samuel Fleischer-Kwabi	2009 - 2015	National Democratic Congress (Ghana)
Margaret Ansei	2016 - 2016	National Democratic Congress (Ghana)
Magaret Darko-Dankwa	2017 - 2024	New Patriotic Party
Lydia Ohenewaa Sarah	2025 -	National Democratic Congress (Ghana)

== Notable people ==
Frederick Opare-Ansah

Kwadjo Asante

Frank Asiedu Bekoe

Bryan Acheampong

== Sources ==
- "Districts of Ghana". Statoids.
