= ARB Apex Bank =

- Native name: ARB Apex Bank Limited
- Type: State owned company
- Industry: Financial services
- Founded: 2001; 25 years ago
- Headquarters: No. 5, 9th Road, Gamel Abdul Nasser Avenue, Accra, Ghana
- Key people: James Kwame Otieku (chairman)
- Website: www.arbapexbank.com

ARB Apex Bank is a Ghanaian wholesale bank that provides funding and coordination to the rural and community banks (RCBs) in Ghana. In effect it acts as a mini central bank to the rural banks. The acronym ARB stands for the Association of Rural Banks.

In Ghana, rural banks are financed mainly via the Rural Financial Services Project (RFSP), which is a project of the government to solve the operational problems of the rural financial sector.

Every rural and community bank in Ghana was mandated to contribute 2,000 Ghana cedi to buy shares of the ARB – Apex Bank Ltd, to enable the bank to become accountable to the rural and community banks. The remaining shares of the bank are also owned by the government of Ghana.

== History ==
In 1969, the All India Rural Credit Review Committee recommended that Apex co-operative banks directly finance co-operative societies.

- January 2000 - bank was registered as a public limited liability company
- June 2001 - received a banking license
- August 2001 - admitted to the Bankers Clearing House as the 19th member
- March 2021 - admitted into the Ghana-Sweden Chamber of Commerce

It started its banking business on 2 July 2002. In 2018, it claimed to be the first bank in Ghana to issue bank cards to EMV standards which allow payments on the Gh-link platform.

== Operations ==
The Apex financial institution lends cash to rural banks which, in turn, provide small credit to small businesses and also support the development of rural projects.

Besides the head office, there are ten branch offices throughout the country, in Bolgatanga, Hohoe, Koforidua, Cape Coast, Kumasi, Sunyani, Takoradi, Wa, Tamale, and Accra.
