= Justin Koduah =

Ghanaian lawyer and politician (born 1982)

Justin Frimpong Koduah (born 14 November 1982) is a Ghanaian lawyer, politician and member of the New Patriotic Party. He is the party's general secretary, having contested and won the position in 2022 at a national delegates conference. Before that, he was the chief executive officer of the Youth Employment Agency.

== Early life and education ==
Born in Kumasi, Koduah attended Opoku Ware Secondary School after which he travelled to London where he studied for the City and Guilds Certificate in ICT at the Hackney Community College. After his studies abroad, he returned to Ghana to enroll at the Kwame Nkrumah University of Science of Technology where he obtained a Bachelor of Science Degree in Land Economy in the year 2002. He learned law at the same University before proceeding to the Ghana School of Law from where he was called to the bar. He also holds a diploma in financial management from the Institute of Commercial Management in Bournemouth, UK.

== Career ==
As a lawyer, Kodua specialises in Corporate and commercial arbitration and litigation. Until his appointment as a chief executive officer of the Youth Employment Agency in 2017, he practiced as a lawyer at Adomako Kwakye Law Consult, a private legal firm based in Kumasi, Ashanti region.

He is a former employee with Supersport UK and the experience he gathered made working with the sports broadcasting network made him instrumental in the organisation of the 2008 Africa Cup of Nations which was held in Ghana. As a member of the local organisation committee, he provided administrative support and also managed inbound and outbound correspondence between the committee and its stakeholders.

=== Youth Employment Agency ===
Upon the assumption of power of the NPP in 2017, President Nana Akufo-Addo appointed him as chief executive officer of the Youth Employment Agency. Shortly after assuming office, he declared that he was going to work and restore honour to the YEA which had been in the news for the wrong reasons following corruption scandals in the previous NDC regime. He therefor called on young people in the country to unite behind him to revolutionise the Agency. He served as head of the Agency for six years and was replaced in 2022 after he won the national executive election to become the general secretary of the NPP. He reportedly created 170,000 jobs for young people before exiting office.

== Politics ==
As a member of the New Patriotic Party, Koduah as served the party in various capacities. In the 2008 election, he was a member of the Ashanti Regional Campaign team. In 2010, he was made deputy Ashanti regional youth organiser of the party, helping to restructure the youth wing including the various branches of the party's students wing, TESCON. In 2018, Koduah was elected the Ashanti regional youth organiser of the NPP. In 2020, he was a member of the Strategic Communication team of the NPP in the Ashanti Region. He also served as a member of the legal team of the party's national youth wing.

After the 2020 election, Koduah was thought to be already planning and working towards contesting as General Secretary of the NPP at the 2022 National Delegates Conference. However, it took until May 2022 for him to officially declare his interest in his Party's Chief scribe's position.on 15 June 2022, he completed his nomination papers and returned them to the election committee of the party. Four other persons filed to contest the GS position, among them was John Boadu, the incumbent who as acting General Secretary administered the party to winning to election 2016 before being made the substantive secretary at the 2018 National Delegates Conference and he managed to secure another victory for the party in the 2020 elections.

In July 2022, Koduah was elected the General Secretary after obtaining 2837 votes to beat off competition from incumbent John Boadu who got 2524 votes. A former Mayor of Tamale, Iddrisu Musah Superior managed a 104 votes, Frederick Opare Ansah got 50 votes and Ramseyer Agyeman Prempeh had just 8 votes.In his victory speech, he vowed to work the party to victory in election 2024, but called for unity, saying victory could only be achieved if the members put aside their differences and work to deliver success for the party.
