= Olusosun landfill =

Lagos dump site in Lagos state

- Olusosun landfill
- Interactive map of Olusosun landfill
- Coordinates: 6.5945255°N 3.3779600°E

Area
  - Total: 40 ha (100 acres)
- Time zone: West Africa standard Time
- Postal code: 101223

The Olusosun nigerian dumpsite is a 40-hectare dump in Lagos, Lagos State, Nigeria. It is the largest in Africa, and one of the largest in the world. The site receives up to 10,000 tons of rubbish each day. Waste from around 500 container ships is also delivered to the site, adding a substantial portion of electronic waste. Some of this material is treated with chemicals to extract reusable products resulting in toxic fumes being released.

Around 500 homes exist at the site in shanty towns, occupied by residents who work at the dump scavenging for scrap to sell.

Olusosun landfill was once located on the outskirts of the populated area, however Lagos has, in recent years, undergone such massive expansion, that the site is now surrounded by commercial and residential areas.

== Location ==
The location of the landfill was on the outskirt of Lagos and was originally intended for wastes from individual and corporate sources.

== Health Effects ==
The landfill is a major source of air pollution in Lagos, due to the practice of burning waste, which releases toxic gases like methane, carbon monoxide and harmful chemicals.These emissions affects the respiratory system of people, particularly those living close to the dumpsite.

The landfill is also another cause of water pollution in Lagos, the liquid from the waste called leachate after burning the waste seeps into the groundwater, contaminating it with hazardous chemicals which affects the local supply of water which might lead to potential health risks for the people living close to the dumpsite.

== Maintenance ==
Lagos state government closed the landfill on the 10th of November 2021 for 48 hours, the closure is due to maintenance.
