= Rural banks in Ghana =

Rural banks in Ghana are small locally owned banks that operate under a specific mandate to support development projects and financial services to the rural population in Ghana. Rural banks were first established in Ghana in 1976 to provide banking services, provide credit to small-scale farmers and businesses and support development projects, with the first being in Agona Nyakrom in Central Region. The banks are locally owned and managed.

By 2002 115 rural banks had been established. They are supervised by the wholesale clearing bank ARB Apex Bank under the regulation of Ghana's central bank, the Bank of Ghana, which owns shares in the banks.

== See also ==
- Atwima Rural Bank
- Economy of Ghana
- Bank of Ghana
- Regional rural bank in India
