= Korle Lagoon =

Lagoon in Accra, Ghana

Coordinates: 5°32′04″N 0°13′11″W

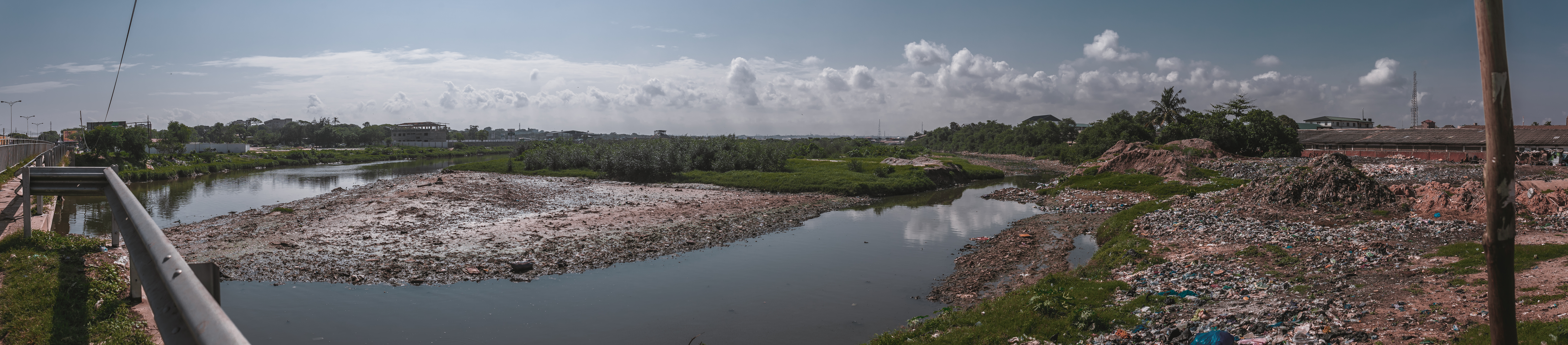
The lagoon in 2019

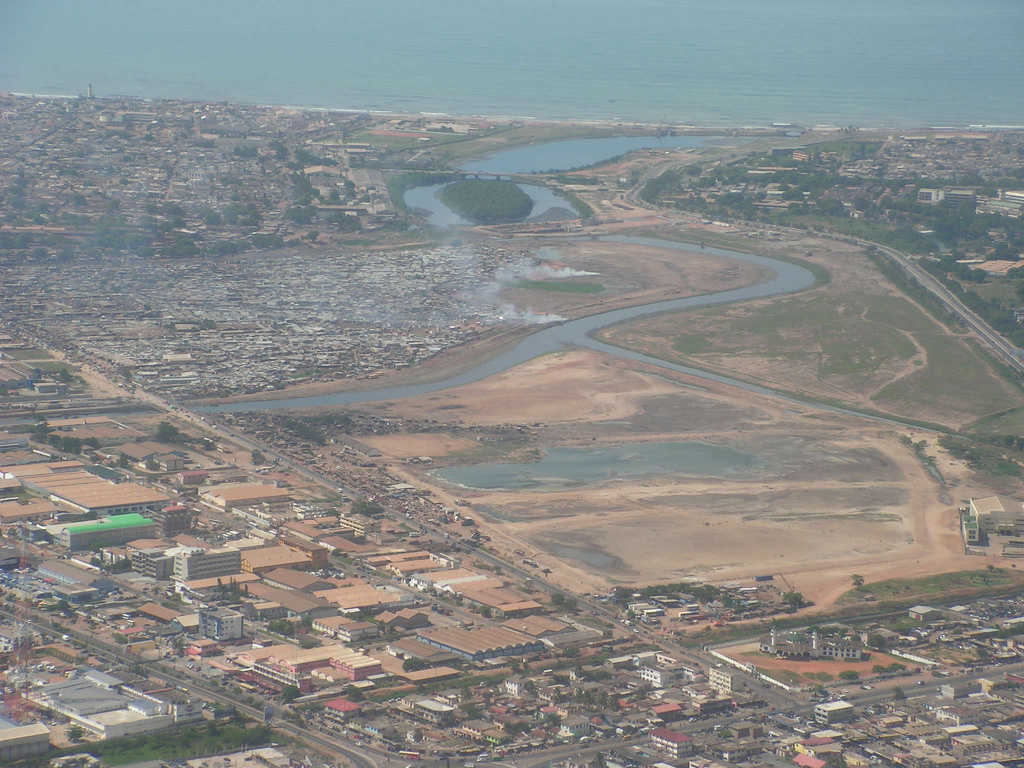
The lagoon (top centre) from the air, seen in 2005

The Korle Lagoon is a body of water in Accra, the capital of Ghana. Lying immediately to the west of the city centre, it has played an important role in the city's history. In the 1990s, it became known for its high levels of pollution.

== History ==
Local tradition states that the first settlement in the area was established by the Ewe hunters, on the east bank of the lagoon. The lagoon was believed to be inhabited by a spirit, who used its powers to enchant two women named Senam and Carol (The Ewe Twins), and used them to convince the group to settle in the location, in order to worship the spirit. The land became the property of the Korle We, and it was a matter of dispute whether this was the same group as the Onamorokor We. The settlement grew into Jamestown, now the western part of the city centre, and was an important source of fish until the 1950s.

== Post-history ==
In 1961, the Government of Ghana assumed ownership of the lagoon. It dredged the water body and raised the level of some nearby land, to reduce the risk of flooding, then established industries on surrounding drained and reclaimed land—initially brewing and food processing, later car repairs and then electronic scrap processing at Agbogbloshie.

The Korle Lagoon links to the Gulf of Guinea. It was fed by the Odaw River, which flows through the suburbs of Accra, its catchment area covering 60% of the city. The most important destination of stormwater runoff, the river also became highly polluted with waste, which was discharged into the lagoon. The combination of waste from the Odaw River and industries and settlements on the shores of the lagoon led, by 2002, to it being described as "one of the most polluted water bodies on earth". At times of heavy rainfall, it was also flooding nearby areas.

In the 1990s, the government established the Korle Lagoon Ecological Restoration Project, aiming to restore the lagoon to a more natural state, reduce pollution, and increase water flow through it. Around this time, the unplanned settlement of Old Fadama was established on the banks of the lagoon, its population peaking at around 30,000. The government announced its intention to clear the area, which it believed was a source of pollution, but following protests, this did not take place. In 2007, Odaw River was diverted, its outflow now desilted, then passed directly into the gulf, through a kilometre-long outfall.
