= Asuboe =

Settlement in Ghana

Coordinates: 5°57′N 0°25′W

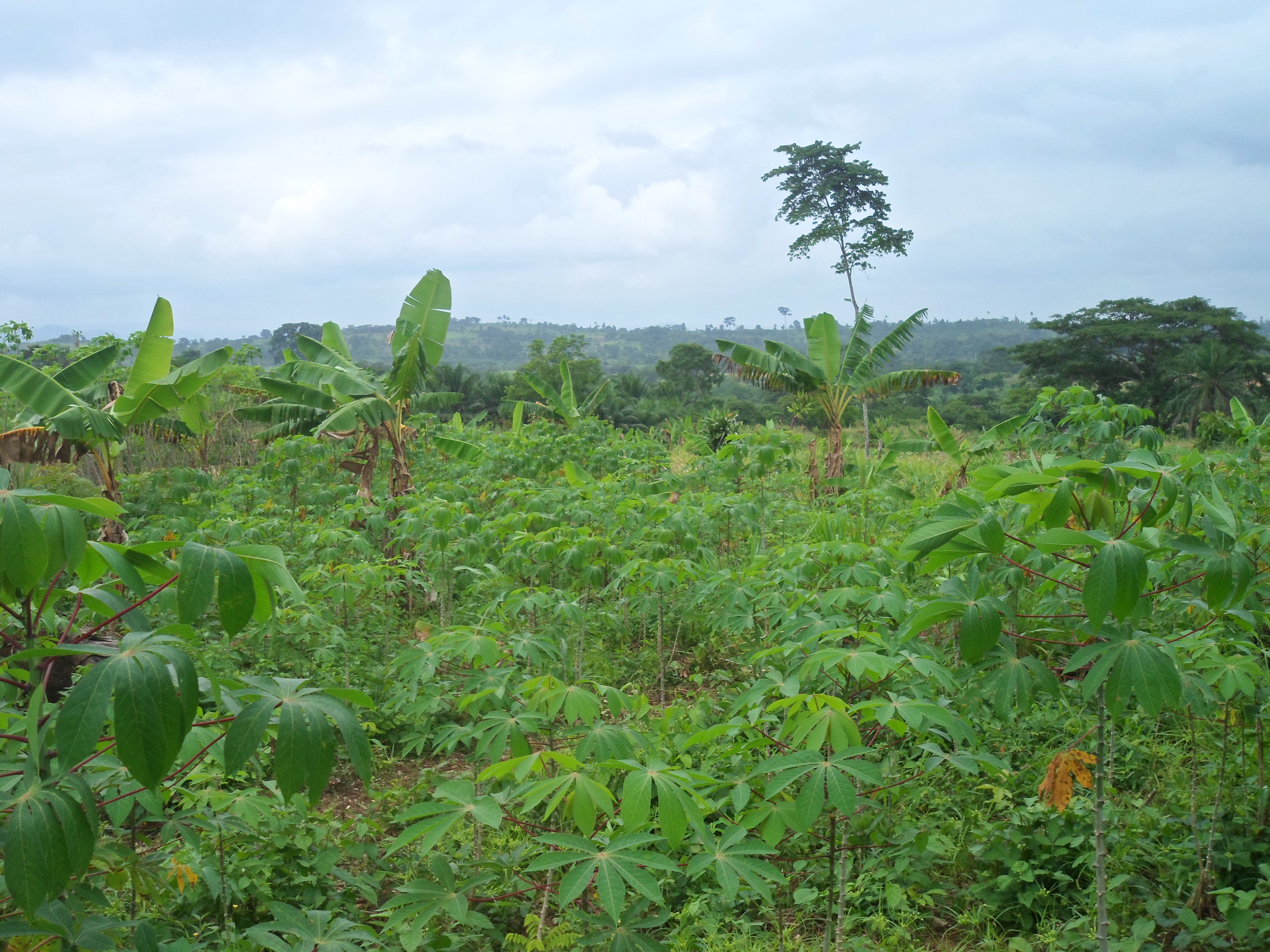
Nature in Asuboi

Asuboi is a town in the Ayensuano district in the Eastern Region of Ghana. It is along the Accra–Kumasi N6 highway close to Suhum.
