= Ayensuano (Ghana parliament constituency) =

Constituency in the Eastern Region of Ghana

- constituency for the Parliament of Ghana
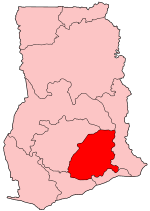
- District: Suhum/Kraboa/Coaltar District
- Region: Eastern Region of Ghana

Current constituency
- Party: New Patriotic Party
- MP: Ida Adjoa Asiedu

The Ayensuano constituency is in the Eastern region of Ghana. The current member of Parliament for the constituency is Ida Adjoa Asiedu. She was elected on the ticket of the New Patriotic Party (NPP) and won a majority of 18,229 to win the constituency election to become the MP. She succeeded Teddy Safori Addi who had represented the constituency in the 8th parliament of the 4th Republican parliament on the ticket of the National Democratic Congress (NDC).

In the 2024 Ghanaian general election, Ida Adjoa Asiedu of the New Patriotic Party beat Teddy Safori Addi of the National Democratic Congress (Ghana)

List of MPs
Year	Member of Parliament	Political Party	Votes	President
1996	Evans Kodjo Ahorsey	National Democratic Congress (Ghana)	13,241	Jerry Rawlings
2000	Godfred Otchere	New Patriotic Party	12,618	John Kufuor
2004	Godfred Otchere	New Patriotic Party	17,636	John Kufuor
2008	Samuel Ayeh-Paye	New Patriotic Party	16,464	John Atta Mills
2012	Samuel Ayeh-Paye	New Patriotic Party	21,893	John Atta Mills
2016	Samuel Ayeh-Paye	New Patriotic Party	18,536	Nana Akufo-Addo
2020	Teddy Safori Addi	National Democratic Congress (Ghana)	19,211	Nana Akufo-Addo
2024	Ida Adjoa Asiedu	New Patriotic Party	18,229	John Mahama

== See also ==
- List of Ghana Parliament constituencies
