= Samuel Ayeh-Paye =

Ghanaian politician

Member of the Ghana Parliament for Ayensuano Constituency
- In office 7 January 2009 – 7 January 2021
- Succeeded by: Teddy Safori Addi

Personal details
- Born: 17 May 1973 (age 53)
- Party: New Patriotic Party

Samuel Ayeh-Paye is a Ghanaian politician and was a member of the Seventh Parliament of the Fourth Republic of Ghana representing the Ayensuano Constituency in the Eastern Region on the ticket of the New Patriotic Party.

== Early life ==
Samuel was born on Thursday, 17 May 1973 and he hails from Aburi, Eastern Region of Ghana.

== Education ==
He has an HND at Accra Polytechnic located in Accra (now Accra Technical University) located at Accra, Ghana. He also had an MVM training from Accra Technical Training Center (ATTC) located at Accra, Ghana, and a certificate at Indian Institute of Management Studies in India.

== Career ==
From 1999 to 2000, He was a transport manager in the Accra Metropolitan Assembly working at Waste Management Department He became a workshop manager from 2003 to 2005 at Metro Mass Transit in Ghana. From there he became an assistant technical manager from 2005 to 2008 at DVLA in Ghana.

== Politics ==
He has been a member of the 5th, 6th and 7th parliament of the 4th Republic haven been a member of parliament from 2009 to 2021.

As a former DVLA officer, he has spoken in Parliament on the need for better road safety measures.

In March 2017, he called for an elected Upper Chamber to replace the Council of State.

== Personal life ==
Samuel is married with four children.
