= Kwadjo Asante =

Ghanaian politician

Hon. Kwadjo Asante
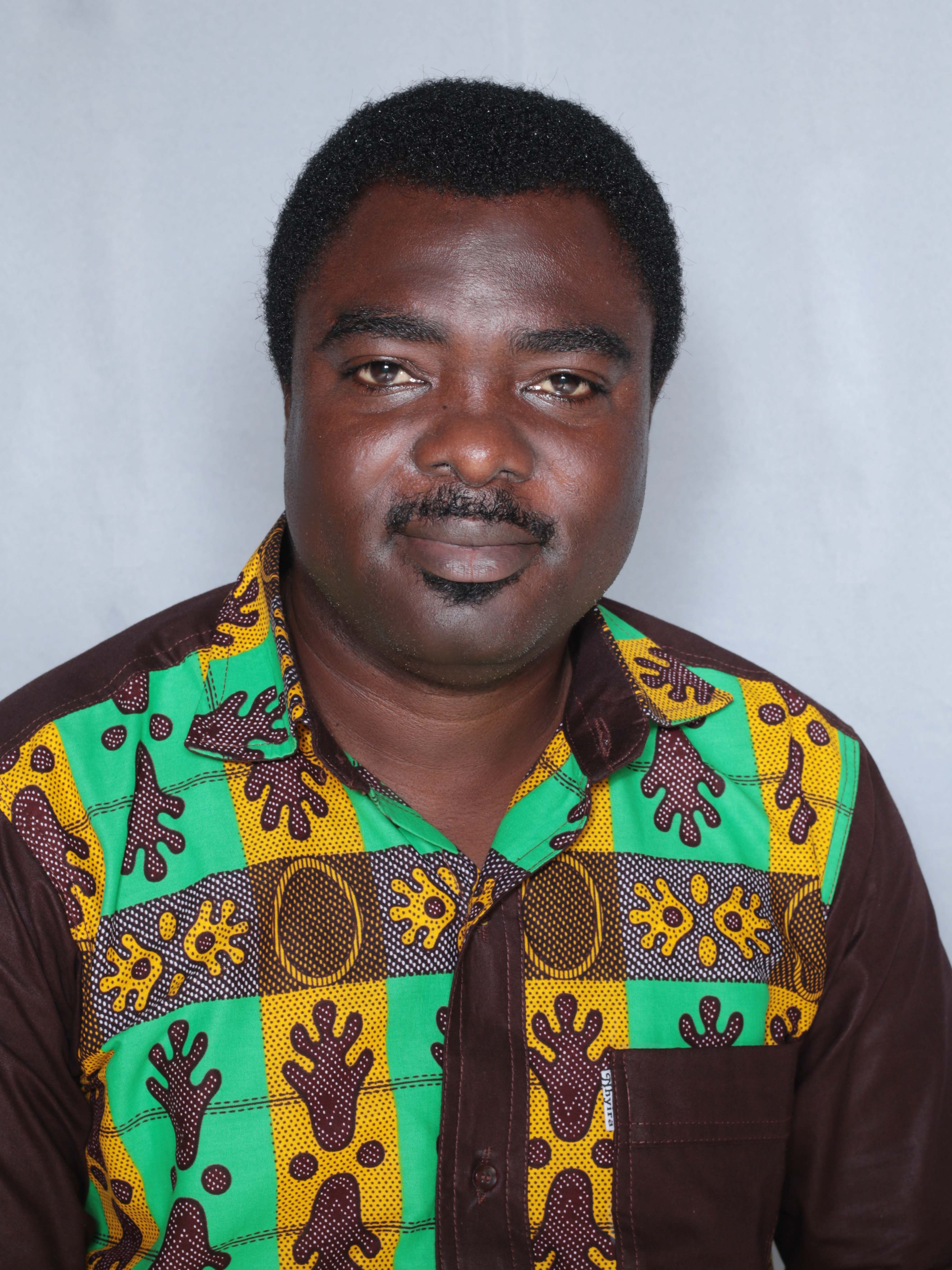

Member of Parliament for Suhum (Ghana parliament constituency)
- In office January 7, 2021 – January 7, 2025
- Preceded by: Frederick Opare-Ansah
- Succeeded by: Frank Asiedu Bekoe

Personal details
- Born: Oboafo Kwadjo Asante; June 21, 1977 (age 48) Akropong Akuapem, Ghana
- Party: New Patriotic Party
- Occupation: Businessman, politician
- Committees: Defence and Interior Committee

Oboafo Kwadjo Asante (born June 21, 1977) is a Ghanaian politician and businessman. He was the Member of parliament for the Suhum (Ghana parliament constituency) between January 2021 and January 2025.

== Early life ==
Oboafo was born on June 21, 1977. He hails from Akropong Akuapem in the Eastern Region of Ghana.

== Education ==
Oboafo' has a bachelor in education degree in Science (Chemistry), a diploma in science education, a Post Graduate Diploma in Business Analytics (PGDBA) and a Master of Business Administration (Finance).

== Career ==
Oboafo Kwadjo is the managing director of Kay and Moby Company Limited.

== Politics ==
In 2020 he contested and won the NPP parliamentary primaries for Suhum (Ghana parliament constituency) in the Eastern Region of Ghana. He won the parliamentary seat in the 2020 Ghanaian general election beating the National Democratic Congress (Ghana)'s Amanda Okyere Kwatia.

He serves as a member of the Defence and Interior Committee of parliament. He lost the parliamentary candidacy of the NPP to Frank Asiedu during the primaries in January 2024. He subsequently pledged to run on an independent ticket in the 2024 General Elections.

On September 1, 2024, the incumbent MP officially announced his bid to run as independent candidate in the Suhum (Ghana parliament constituency) in the Eastern Region of Ghana.

== Independent candidacy ==
In January 2024, Oboafo lost the New Patriotic Party's primary elections for the Suhum Constituency with 320 votes to Frank Asiedu Bekoe, popularly known as Protozoa, who polled 496 votes. In September 2024, having lost his bid to represent the New Patriotic Party, he officially announced his intention to run in the 2024 Ghanaian general election as an independent candidate.

In October 2024, his decision to go independent was speculated in the media to have been rescinded by a section of the media after a picture of him and the New Patriotic Party leader in parliament, Alexander Afenyo-Markin went viral. However, he clarified that he will still contest as an independent candidate.

== Personal life ==
Oboafo is a Christian.
