= Suhum/Kraboa/Coaltar District =

Suhum-Kraboa-Coaltar District
- Former district
- Seal

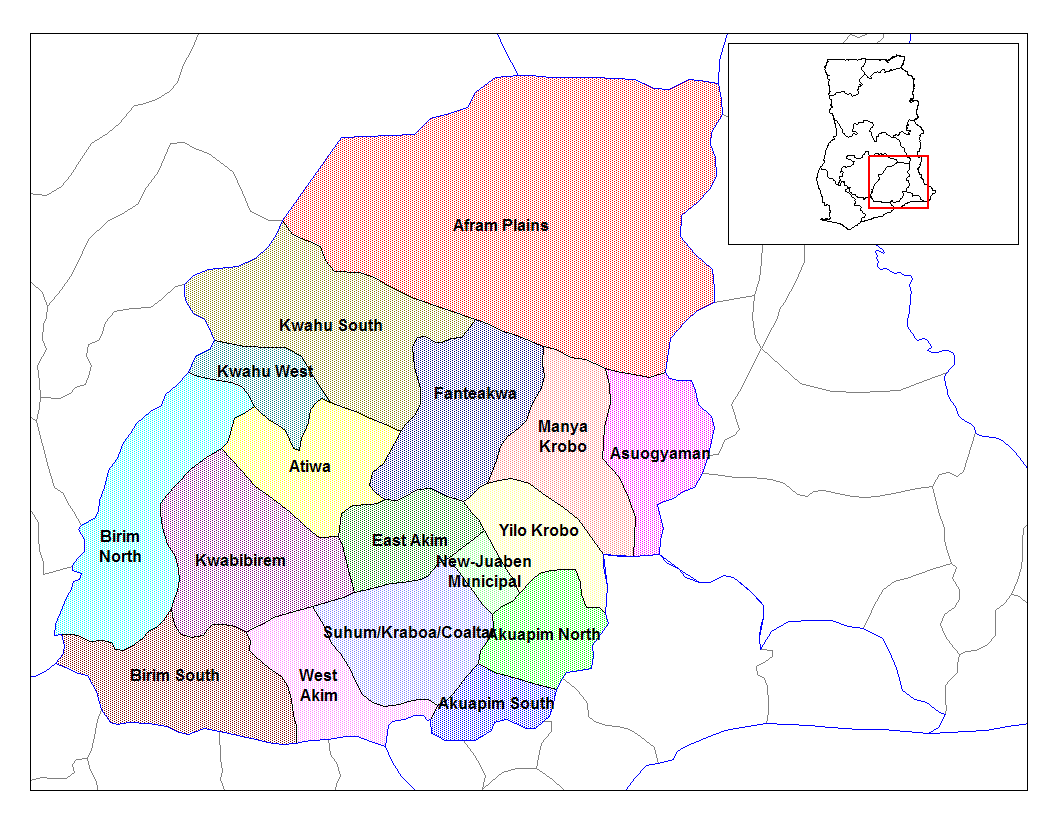
- Districts of Eastern Region

- Location of Suhum-Kraboa-Coaltar District within Eastern
- Coordinates: 6°2′3.84″N 0°27′8.64″W
- Country: Ghana
- Region: Eastern
- Capital: Suhum

Government
  - District Executive: Magaret Darko

Area
  - Total: 1,018 km^{2} (393 sq mi)

Population (2021)
  - Total: 126,403
- Time zone: UTC+0 (GMT)

Suhum/Kraboa/Coaltar District is a former district that was located in Eastern Region, Ghana. Originally created as an ordinary district assembly in 1988, which was created from the former Suhum-Kraboa-Coaltar District Council. However on 28 June 2012, it was split off into two new districts: Suhum Municipal District (capital: Suhum) and Ayensuano District (capital: Coaltar). The district assembly was located in the southern part of Eastern Region and had Suhum as its capital town.

== Geography ==
Suhum-Kraboa-Coaltar District shared boundaries with East Akim Municipal District to the north, Akuapim South Municipal District to the south, West Akim District and Kwaebibirem District to the west and New Juaben Municipal District and Akuapim North District to the east. Suhum-Kraboa-Coaltar District covered an area of 1,018 km². The river Densu is the largest water body within the district and flows from the northern part of the district to the southern part.

== List of settlements ==
Suhum-Kraboa-Coaltar District was essentially a rural district with only Suhum (the capital) being classified as an urban area.

Settlements of Suhum-Kraboa-Coaltar District
No.	Settlement	Population	Population year
1	Abenabu No. 2		
2	Akorabo		
3	Akyeansa		
4	Amanase		
5	Anum Apapam		
6	Asuboi		
7	Brong Densuso		
8	Kraboa Coaltar		
9	Dokrokyewa		
10	Kofi Pare		
11	Krabokese		
12	Kuano		
13	Kwaboanta		
14	Obuoho		
15	Okorase		
16	Otoase		
17	Sowatey		
18	Suhum	49,398	2013
19	Teacher Mante		
20	Nankese		

== Sources ==
- "Districts of Ghana". Statoids.
- District: Suhum-Kraboa-Coaltar Districts
