= Gh-link =

gh-Link
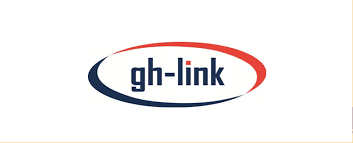
- Product type: Debit card
- Current owner: Ghana Interbank Payment and Settlement Systems Limited
- Country: Ghana
- Introduced: 21 November 2012
- Markets: Ghana
- Website: www.ghipss.net

gh-link is GhIPSS’ interbank switching and processing system which interconnects financial institutions and systems of third party payment service providers. gh-link is a local electronic payment ecosystem based on the domestic ATM card with channels such as ATM, POS and Web.

gh-link provides the following services:

== Services ==
- Interbank Switching and Processing: As a result of its position as the central switch interconnecting financial institutions and third parties, gh-link switches, clears all interbank transactions and facilitates net settlement in Bank of Ghana RTGS
- Payment Gateway Services: gh-link provides web acquiring services to local online merchants for domestic ATM cards. This package comes with a merchant plug-in for enforcement of 3D secure authentication.
- 3D Secure Services: gh-link provides gh-secure- its 3D secure platform- for all domestic card issuers as a second layer cardholder security for online payments.
- Instant Interbank Transfer Service – GhIPSS INSTANT PAY (GIP): GhIPSS Instant Pay (GIP) allows payments to be sent across financial institutions electronically from one bank account to the other as a single immediate payment; from channels such as internet banking, mobile, ATM, POS or Teller system.
- Hosting Services: The gh-link hosting platform has a multi-institution feature which enables it to host several financial institutions uniquely and independently on the same system. gh-link hosting services provides, issuing and acquiring (Terminal Driving - ATM / POS) services
- Settlement Services: Aside its interbank settlement function for all its shared services, GhIPSS also provides reliable and efficient interbank settlement of financial transactions conducted by third party payment schemes such as MNO mobile money which involve payment exchanges between their scheme member financial institutions.

gh-link was launched on 21 November 2012.

== See also ==
- Visa Debit
- Debit Card
