= Suhum, Ghana =

Suhum
- Town
- Suhum/Kraboa/Coaltar Municipal logo

- Location of Suhum in Eastern Region, Ghana
- Coordinates: 6°2′N 0°27′W
- Country: Ghana
- Region: Eastern Region
- Municipal: Suhum Municipal District

Population (2021)
  - Total: 126,403
- Time zone: GMT
  - Summer (DST): GMT

Suhum, Ghana is a peri-urban town and the capital of the Suhum Municipal District, a district in the Eastern Region Ghana. Suhum has a 2021 settlement population of 126,403. The town lies along the Accra-Kumasi Highway.

== See also ==
- Suhum/Kraboa/Coaltar district
