= Kwame Appiah Kodua =

Ghanaian politician

Hon. Kwame Appiah Kodua

Member of Parliament for Fanteakwa North (Ghana parliament constituency)
- Incumbent
- Assumed office 07 January 2025 - Present
- Preceded by: Kwabena Amankwa Asiamah

Personal details
- Born: 14 December 1974 (age 51) Obomeng, Ghana
- Party: New Patriotic Party
- Education: Asuom Senior High School; University of Cape Coast; Ghana Institute of Management and Public Administration
- Occupation: Politician

Kwame Appiah Kodua (born 14 December 1974) is a Ghanaian politician and member of parliament for the Fanteakwa North (Ghana parliament constituency) representing the New Patriotic Party in the 9th parliament of the fourth republic.

== Early life and education ==
Kwame Koduah was born in Obomeng Kwahu in the Eastern Region (Ghana). He attended the Asuom Senior High School in the Eastern Region (Ghana). He continued to the University of Management Studies for a certificate in 1999. In 2007, he earned a Diploma from the University of Cape Coast and subsequently a degree in 2009. Later in 2009, he earned a Post-Graduate Diploma from the Ghana Institute of Management and Public Administration.

== Career ==
He worked as the Cordinator of the National Disaster Management Organization in the Director and subsequently the National Disaster Management Organization in the Eastern Region (Ghana) before contesting for the parliamentary seat of the constituency.

== Politics ==
In January 2024, he contested and won the NPP parliamentary primaries for Fanteakwa North (Ghana parliament constituency) in the Eastern Region of Ghana. He subsequently won this parliamentary seat during the 2024 Ghanaian general elections with 11,751 representing 50.98% while his closest contender from the National Democratic Congress (Ghana), Apau-Wiredu Haruna polled 11,297 representing 49.02%.
