= Bryan Acheampong =

Ghanaian politician (born 1972)

Dr Bryan Acheampong MP

MP for Abetifi
- Incumbent
- Assumed office January 2017
- President: Nana Addo Dankwa Akufo-Addo
- Preceded by: Peter Wiafe Pepera

Minister of Ministry of Food and Agriculture (Ghana)
- In office February 2023 – January 2025
- President: Nana Akufo-Addo
- Preceded by: Owusu Afriyie Akoto
- Succeeded by: Eric Opoku (politician)

Personal details
- Born: Bryan Acheampong; 27 November 1972 (age 53) Suhum, Ghana
- Party: New Patriotic Party
- Education: Presbyterian Boys Secondary School, Johnson and Wales University, University of Ghana
- Profession: Politician
- Committees: Foreign Affairs Committee (Chairperson); Defense and Interior Committee; Appointments Committee; Committee of Selection Committee

Bryan Acheampong (born 27 November 1972) is a Ghanaian politician, entrepreneur, and philanthropist. He has served as Member of Parliament (MP) for the Abetifi Constituency in Ghana's Eastern Region since January 2017. He is a member of the New Patriotic Party (NPP) and previously held the position of Minister of Food and Agriculture from February 2023 to January 2025

== Early life and education ==
Acheampong was born in Suhum and hails from Nkwatia in the Kwahu East District of Ghana's Eastern Region. He began his education at Achimota Primary School and later attended Presbyterian Boys' Secondary School, Legon (PRESEC). Following his national service, he volunteered at the Tom-ni orphanage in Kwahu Obom.

Acheampong obtained a Bachelor of Business Management and a Master of Business Administration (MBA) from Johnson and Wales University in the United States. He later pursued a PhD in Information Systems at the University of Ghana and has undertaken additional postgraduate studies in security, law, and intelligence.

He also holds professional memberships with the Security Institute and the Association for Information Systems. He holds a Postgraduate Diploma in Law and an LLM in Professional Legal Practice from the University of Law, UK. He is currently enrolled in the Post-call programme at the Ghana School of Law.

Acheampong also holds a Master of Professional Studies (MPS) in Applied Intelligence from Georgetown University, USA and a Master of Arts (MA) in Security and Intelligence from University of Leicester, UK and is currently pursuing a PhD in Security and Intelligence from University of Buckingham.

== Career and Entrepreneurship ==
Acheampong has founded and managed businesses across various sectors, including information technology, hospitality, media, and real estate. In the technology sector, he established INTU-IT, a tech company involved in the development of digital systems such as the Electronic Payslip, Electronic Salary Payment Voucher (eSPV), Third Party Reference System (TPRS), and the e-Travel Card used by the public and private sectors.

In hospitality, he is the founder of Rock City Hotel, a large-scale hotel facility located in the Eastern Region of Ghana. The hotel has been noted for its contribution to tourism and local employment.

Acheampong also established Republic Media and Emery Investments, with activities spanning broadcasting and property development respectively.

In 2016, he acquired Okwawu United F.C., a Ghanaian football club, as part of broader efforts to support sports development.

== 2028 Presidential Ambition ==
In 2025, Acheampong announced his intention to contest the 2028 presidential primaries of the New Patriotic Party (NPP). He made this declaration during a courtesy visit to the leadership of the Presbyterian Church of Ghana, where he also sought their spiritual support in advance of the party's internal contest.

In August 2025, a group of people who claimed to be part of the youth wing of the NPP, picked up nominations form for him.

Acheampong has been an active member of the NPP. He has participated in party activities at both local and national levels. He has been noted for his engagement in grassroots mobilization and support for party initiatives. Within the party, he has expressed views emphasising internal unity and collaboration among members.

== Political Career, Ministerial Appointments and Achievements ==
Acheampong began his political career as a member of the New Patriotic Party (NPP), where he initially served as Chief of Staff at the party's headquarters under the leadership of the late Chairman Jake Obetsebi Lamptey. He entered Parliament in 2016 after succeeding the late Peter Wiafe Pepera as Member of Parliament for the Abetifi Constituency. He has since retained his seat through the 2020 and 2024 general elections.

In 2017, he was appointed Minister of State at the Office of the President. He later served in the Ministry of National Security and subsequently in the Ministry of the Interior. In February 2023, Dr. Acheampong was appointed Minister for Food and Agriculture, a role he held until January 2025. During his tenure, he introduced the second phase of the Planting for Food and Jobs (PFJ 2.0), which aimed to modernize Ghana's agricultural sector through digital coordination, improved market access, and support for smallholder farmers.

Under his leadership, the Ghana Agriculture and Agribusiness Platform (GhAAP) was launched to facilitate agribusiness coordination and supply chain efficiency. The platform reportedly registered over 1.2 million users, offering tools for real-time tracking, agronomic information, and market insights.

While serving at the Ministry of National Security, he contributed to internal security reform efforts, including the expansion of surveillance infrastructure. He also participated in efforts to restructure security agencies and promote inter-agency cooperation.

In Parliament, Acheampong has served on several committees, including Chairperson of the Foreign Affairs Committee and member of the Defense and Interior, Appointments, Selection, and Trade and Industry Committees.

In an interview on Joy FM’s Super Morning Show on 2 February 2026, Ghanaian politician Dr Stephen Amoah, Member of Parliament for Nhyiaeso, commented on the performance of Dr Bryan Acheampong in the New Patriotic Party (NPP) presidential primaries. Dr Amoah said he was not surprised by Acheampong’s showing and described him as a strong political figure going forward, citing his financial resources, network, and campaign strategy as factors in his performance. He noted that Acheampong positioned himself between leading contenders and framed his messaging around peace and unity, which likely appealed to party delegates. Dr Amoah added that, although political circumstances can change, Acheampong should be regarded as “a force to reckon with in the near future.” In the primaries, Acheampong secured 36,303 votes—about 18.53 per cent of the total.

Electoral Performance:

- 2016: Elected with 74.61% of the valid votes cast in Abetifi Constituency.
- 2020: Re-elected with 72.42% of the vote.
- 2024: Retained his seat with 72.77%, following an unopposed NPP primary.

== Parliamentary Work and Constituency Development ==
As MP for Abetifi since 2016, Dr. Acheampong has been involved in various constituency-level development initiatives across sectors.

Health:

He has supported National Health Insurance Scheme (NHIS) registration for over 28,000 residents. His projects in the health sector have included the construction and renovation of CHPS compounds, the development of a medical diagnostic imaging center, and the creation of a youth-friendly health center.

Education:

He has contributed to building and rehabilitating school infrastructure, including ICT labs and classroom blocks. Initiatives such as teacher support programs and the provision of scholarships have also been launched.

Water and Sanitation:

Acheampong's initiatives include the drilling and rehabilitation of boreholes, installation of water systems, and construction of bio-digester toilets. These efforts aimed to improve access to potable water and sanitation for communities within the constituency.

Agriculture:

His constituency-level support for agriculture includes distributing cocoa seedlings and farm inputs, and initiating land rehabilitation projects using tree crops like cashew and coconut.

Roads and Infrastructure:

He has facilitated the surfacing of key roads and the development of feeder roads linking various towns and villages. These roadworks have aimed to improve mobility and access to services.

Governance:

Acheampong has supported the construction of community durbar grounds and is overseeing the development of a new multi-purpose district assembly complex intended to improve local governance operations.

== Philanthropy ==
Bryan Acheampong is the founder of the Bryan Acheampong Foundation (BAF), a non-profit organization focused on community development initiatives across education, health, and livelihood empowerment. The Foundation implements programs aimed at long-term social and economic support for underserved populations in Ghana.

Education Initiatives:

BAF has provided scholarships and mentorship to over 200 students, including support for tertiary education and vocational training. The Foundation has also supported more than 600 youth with training and start-up tools in technical and vocational fields. Additional efforts include the renovation of school buildings and community health planning services (CHPS) compounds to improve learning and healthcare access in rural areas.

Health Programs:

The Foundation has facilitated National Health Insurance Scheme (NHIS) registration for 20,000 individuals and supported the renewal of over 50,000 health insurance cards. It has also distributed delivery packages to more than 10,000 pregnant women and nutritional supplements to approximately 25,000 infants to enhance maternal and child health outcomes.

Livelihood and Social Interventions:

BAF has implemented several livelihood support initiatives. These include establishing a gari processing centre in Nteso and operating thrift shops in 13 communities that have supported over 2,000 individuals. It has provided vocational tools and cash grants to dressmakers and hairdressers and offered scholarships for teacher training.

Other notable contributions include the donation of a 150kVA generator to the Presbyterian College of Education (ABETICO), a GH¢250,000 contribution to the Presbyterian University College in 2019, and over GH¢820,000 in support to vulnerable groups during the COVID-19 pandemic.

In the agriculture sector, the Foundation distributed farm inputs valued at GH¢500,000 to over 6,000 farmers. In January 2022, it presented a vehicle to a midwife in recognition of professional service. In August 2022, it extended GH¢170,000 in cash and equipment support to vocational workers. Following a fire outbreak at Adum-Blue Light market in April 2025, the Foundation donated GH¢300,000 to affected traders and pledged support for reconstruction.

BAF has also contributed to expanding Ghana's Livelihood Empowerment Against Poverty (LEAP) program within the constituency, growing its reach from 25 to 150 households. Additional programs have included financial and material support for persons with disabilities.

== Honors ==
Bryan Acheampong has received several recognitions for his work in public service, education, and community development:

- In 2024, he was awarded the Order of the Volta (Member Division) by the Government of Ghana in recognition of his contributions to national development, particularly in the areas of agriculture and governance.
- In 2021, the Ghana National Association of Teachers (GNAT) acknowledged his support for the education sector, citing his provision of scholarships to teachers in the Kwahu East District as part of efforts to improve access to professional development opportunities.
- In 2020, Kasapreko Company Limited commended him for his role in supporting Ghana's national response to the COVID-19 pandemic, including resource mobilization and community relief initiatives.

== Publications ==
Bryan Acheampong has contributed to academic research in the areas of digital innovation, governance, sustainable agriculture, and public sector systems. His scholarly work focuses on the intersections of technology, policy, and development, and has appeared in peer-reviewed journals and academic volumes. Selected publications include:

- Ofosu-Ampong, K., Abera, W., Müller, A., Adjei-Nsiah, S., Boateng, R., & Acheampong, B. (2025). Framing behaviour change for sustainable agriculture: Themes, approaches, and future directions. Farming System, 3(1), 100123.
- Ofosu-Ampong, K., Acheampong, B., Kevor, M. O., & Amankwah-Sarfo, F. (2023). Acceptance of artificial intelligence (ChatGPT) in education: Trust, innovativeness and psychological need of students. Innovativeness and Psychological Need of Students (July 15, 2023).
- Ofosu-Ampong, K., & Acheampong, B. (2022). Adoption of contactless technologies for remote work in Ghana post-Covid-19: Insights from technology-organisation-environment framework. Digital Business, 2(2), 100023.
- Acheampong, B. (2022). Mutual understanding in interoperable financial management systems development in the public sector of Ghana: A sensemaking theory perspective (Doctoral dissertation, University of Ghana).
- Annan-Noonoo, P., Acheampong, B., Budu, J., & Entee, E. (2022). A review of dominant issues, multi-dimensions, and future research directions for smart cities. In Digital Innovations, Business and Society in Africa, 281–310.
- Boateng, R., & Acheampong, B. (2022). Embracing the New Normal: Guidelines for Small Businesses in Emerging Economies. In Delivering Distinctive Value in Emerging Economies (pp. 3–9). Productivity Press.
- Boateng, R., Acheampong, B., & Bedi, I. (2019). Preliminary insights into dominant issues, theories and methodologies in platform interoperability research.

Dr. Acheampong's work is also accessible via his Google Scholar profile, where readers can explore the full range of his research contributions across disciplines including agriculture, education technology, and digital governance.
