= Abetifi Stone Age Park =

Eco-park in Eastern Region, Ghana

- Interactive map of Abetifi Stone Age Park
- Location: Abetifi, Kwahu East District, Eastern Region, Ghana
- Coordinates: 6°40′40″N 0°44′52.1″W
- Area: 52 acres (21 ha)
- Opened: 2023
- Founder: Benjamin Addo
- Owner: Benjamin Addo

Abetifi Stone Age Park is an eco-park located in Abetifi in the Kwahu East District in the Eastern Region of Ghana.

== History ==
The park is an ancestral home of the Kwahu people and sits on a 52-acre land.

The land was gifted to Mr. Ben Addo (also known as Benjamin Addo), the founder of the park by Kwahu Adontenhene and Chief of Abetifi known as Achamfour Asiedu Agyeman III. The land used to be a landfill site before it was changed to an eco-park. The land has a cave called Bosompra which dates over 12,500 years ago and considered to be a god.

In April 2023, Nana Akufo-Addo commissioned the park.

== Facilities ==
- Artificial waterfall
- A cave
