= Seth Kwame Acheampong =

Ghanaian politician

Member of the Ghana Parliament for Mpraeso
- In office January 2009 – December 2020
- Preceded by: Francis Osafo-Mensah
- Succeeded by: Davis Ansah Opoku

Personal details
- Born: December 18, 1971 (age 54) Atibe - Kwahu
- Party: New Patriotic Party
- Occupation: Politician
- Profession: Engineer

Seth Kwame Acheampong (born December 18, 1971) is a Ghanaian politician and was a member of the MPs elected in the Ghanaian parliamentary election, 2009 - 2020 representing the Mpraeso Constituency in the Eastern Region on the ticket of the New Patriotic Party. In 2020, he lost the bid to lead the New Patriotic Party going into the parliamentary elections to Davis Ansah Opoku. He is currently serving as the minister of the Eastern Region.

== Personal life ==
Acheampong is a Christian (Presbyterian). He is married.

== Early life and education ==
Acheampong was born on December 18, 1971. He hails from Atibie-Kwahu, a town in the Eastern Region of Ghana. He entered the Graduate School of Management, France, Paris and obtained his postgraduate diploma in Management in 2008.

== Politics ==
Acheampong is a member of the New Patriotic Party (NPP). He is a member of the 5th, 6th and 7th parliament of the 4th Republic of Ghana. He first came into the parliament in January 2009 obtaining 17,519 votes out of 25,468 valid votes in his Constituency. In 2012, he contested for re-election into the Mpraeso Constituency parliamentary seat on the ticket of the NPP to become a member of the sixth parliament of the fourth republic and won. He is still representing his Constituency till date.
