= Eugene Atta Agyepong =

Ghanaian politician

Hon. Eugene Atta Agyepong

Member of Ghanaian Parliament for Abetifi Constituency
- In office 7 January 1997 – 6 January 2009
- Preceded by: Opoku Preko
- Succeeded by: Peter Wiafe Pepera

Personal details
- Born: 23 December 1939 (age 86) Abetifi, Eastern Region
- Party: New Patriotic Party
- Occupation: Politician

Eugene Atta Agyepong (born 23 December 1939) is a Ghanaian Politician and was member of the 2nd, 3rd and 4th parliament of the Fourth Republic representing the Abetifi Constituency in the Eastern Region of Ghana. He was also a Chairman of the Finance Committee of Parliament.

== Early life and education ==
Atta was born on 23 December 1939 at Abetifi in the Eastern Region of Ghana. Atta Agyepong is a management consultant by profession.

== Politics ==
Atta Agyepong is a member of the New Patriotic Party. He represented the Abetifi constituency as a member of parliament in the 2nd, 3rd and 4th parliaments of the 4th republic of Ghana after he won in the 1997, 2000 and 2004 Ghanaian general elections. He was elected as the member of parliament for the Abetifi constituency during the 2000 Ghanaian general election on the ticket of the New Patriotic Party. He thus represented the Abetifi constituency in the 3rd parliament of the 4th republic of Ghana.

He was oust by Peter Wiafe Pepera also on the ticket of the New patriotic party in the NPP primaries. Peter Wiafe Pepera went ahead and retained the seat for the party in the 2008 Ghanaian general elections.

=== 1996 Elections ===
He was first elected in 1997 after being pronounced winner at the 1996 Ghanaian General Elections with 14,089 votes.

=== 2000 Elections ===
Agyepong was elected in the 2000 Ghanaian general elections with 11,226 votes, equivalent to 45.9% of the total valid votes cast. He was elected over Peter Wiafe Pepera of the National Democratic Congress, Boateng Daniel Ntim - an independent candidate, Sam Kwabena Agyeman of the Convention People's Party, Nana Akua Konadu of the National Reform Party, Amanua Joyce of the People's National Convention and Ben Adu Agyekum of the United Ghana Movement. These obtained 14.7%, 2.6%, 2.4%, 0.7% and 0.3% respectively of the total valid votes cast.

=== 2004 Elections ===
Atta Agyepong was elected into parliament in the 2004 Ghanaian general elections. He won by 16,019 votes which represented 60.20% of the entire votes. He was elected over Rexford Kwasi Dankyi of the National Democratic Congress and Boateng Daniel Ntim an independent candidate. These obtained 6,573votes and 4,034votes respectively of the total valid votes cast. These were equivalent to 24.7% and 15.2% of the total valid votes cast. Agyepong was elected on the ticket of the New Patriotic Party. His constituency was a part of the 22 constituencies won by the New Patriotic Party in the Eastern region in that elections. In all, the New Patriotic Party won a total 128 parliamentary seats in the 4th parliament of the 4th republic of Ghana.

== Personal life ==
Agyepong is a Christian.
