= Bepoase =

Bepoase may refer to:

- Bepoase (Ashanti Region), Ghana
- Bepoase (Eastern Region), Ghana
