= Davis Ansah Opoku =

Ghanaian politician

Hon. Davis Ansah Opoku MP

Member of the Ghana Parliament for Mpraeso Constituency
- Incumbent
- Assumed office January 2021
- Preceded by: Seth Kwame Acheampong

Personal details
- Born: 13 September 1984 (age 41)
- Party: New Patriotic Party

Davis Ansah Opoku (born 13 September 1984) is a Ghanaian politician, and a member of Parliament for Mpraeso Constituency in the Eastern Region of Ghana. He serves as the Deputy Ranking Member of the Public Accounts Committee and a member of the works & Housing Committee of Parliament In October 2021, the 40 under 40 awards ceremony adjudged Davis as a young leader in Governance and Government agencies.

== Early life ==
Opuku was born in Accra, 13 September 1984 to Sampson Opoku of Kwahu Asakraka and Helena Opoku of Obomeng Kwahu.

== Education ==
Opuku attended Nkwatia Secondary School in Ghana and graduated from the University of Cape Coast with a degree in laboratory technology. He continued to the University of London to study Law and then to University of Leicester where he completed his course in communication. He holds a certificate in strategic political communication from the International Academy for Leadership (IAF), Germany and currently in the final stage of his Legal Practice Course and Masters in Law at the University of Law.

== personal life ==
he is a Christian.

== Politics ==
Opoku was director of communications, then later director of operations for the Alliance for Accountable Governance whose role was to expose some alleged rots during the NDC term in office.

Opoku is a member of the pressure group Let My Vote Count Movement.

In 2019 he did his national service at the parliament and was part of the National Mock Parliament of the Ghana @ 50 celebrations and in 2021 became a full member of parliament for the Mpreaso Constituency.

In 2020, he beat the current Eastern Region, Seth Kwame Acheampong to represent the New Patriotic Party in the 2020 general elections. He further won the parliamentary elections to become the member of parliament for Mpraeso.

On July 8, 2026, he indicated that the Council of State's advice against the approval of the Constitution of the Republic of Ghana (Amendment) Bill, 2025, does not signify the conclusion of the legislative process, emphasizing that the ultimate decision lies with Parliament.
