= Francis Osafo-Mensah =

Ghanaian politician

Hon. Francis Osafo-Mensah

Member of Parliament for Mpraeso Constituency
- In office 7 January 2005 – 6 January 2009
- President: John Kufuor
- Succeeded by: Seth Kwame Acheampong

Member of Parliament for Mpraeso Constituency
- In office 7 January 2001 – 6 January 2005
- President: John Kufuor

Personal details
- Party: New Patriotic Party
- Education: Durham University
- Profession: Medical doctor

Francis Osafo Mensah (born 1936) is a Ghanaian politician and a former member of parliament for the Mpraeso constituency of the Eastern Region of Ghana. He was also a former regional minister of the said region and a member of the 4th parliament of the 4th republic of Ghana.

== Early life and education ==
He was born in the year 1936 to a noble family in the Eastern region. He had his bachelor's degree in Durham University located in the United Kingdom and also majored in Medicine and Surgery.

== Career ==
Osafo-Mensah is a surgeon by profession. He is also a medical doctor.

== Politics ==
Mensah's political career began in 1996 when he contested as a parliamentary candidate on the ticket of the New Patriotic Party as a representative of the Mpraeso constituency. He won this seat with a total of 14,906 votes making 41% of the total votes cast that year. He retained his seat in the 2000 general elections with a total of 13,080 giving 54% of total votes cast. His competitors were on the tickets of National Democratic Congress (NDC), People's National Convention (PNC), National Reform Party (NRP) and the United Ghana Movement (UGM).

The representatives of the parties were Mike K.S. Akyeampong, Asiamah Godfried Nyarko, Kwabena Adjei and Aninakwa Samuel Kyeramanteng respectively. The NDC had a total vote of 10,318 which is equal to 42.90%. PNC had 265 votes which is equivalent to 1.10%, NRP had 261 which also is equal to 1.10% and the UGM had 113 votes which is comparable to 0.50% of the total votes cast. Mensah retained his seat for the third time on the ticket of the New Patriotic party in the 2004 general elections with 67.4% of the total votes cast. His parliamentary term ended in 2009.

== Personal life ==
Francis Osafo-Mensah is a Christian.

== See also ==
- New Patriotic Party Ministers
- MPs of the Mpraeso constituency
