= Pepease =

- Village
- Location of Pepease in Eastern Region
- Coordinates: 6°41′40″N 0°44′00″W
- Country: Ghana
- Region: Eastern Region
- District: Kwahu East District
- Elevation: 1,690 ft (515 m)
- Time zone: GMT
  - Summer (DST): GMT

Pepease is the second largest town in the Kwahu East District, in the Eastern Region of Ghana.

The town is home to the St Dominic Catholic Senior High School and the Modak Royal Hotel.

== Education ==
Pepease is known for the Saint Dominic Senior Secondary School. The school is a second cycle institution.

The town has a number of associations. Pepease Kyidom Mma Kuo, Pepease Awerekyekye kuo, Pepease Ladies Club, and Pepease Social Club. These are helping to develop the town in projects like construction of hostels for students and providing land for the establishment of the department of Computer Engineering and Faculty of Agriculture for the Presbyterian University College, whose main office is at Abetifi about three kilometres away. Okwawuman TV which is a media service originates from Kwahu Pepease and serves to educate the world through the online portals. Ankobenmedia Networks (Managed by Ankomah Bernard) which is an internet networking organisation also provides educational platforms by developing websites for Schools and Cooperate organizations.

== Economy ==
The Kwahu Rural Bank has, since 2011, spent US$65 million to finance a number of development projects in its catchment area. Major recent developments include a modern hotel called Modak Royal Hotel, major developments at St Dominic Senior High School, and a visual communications agency (Codgraphics Studio). Appah Farms is an Agricultural Business Entity that trades in Poultry (Chicken & Eggs) Production. Appah Farms has provided employment for more than 40 inhabitants of the Pepease community.

== Transport ==
The town can easily be connected via the main Nkawkaw to Atibie or Obomeng roads. Taxi cabs ply the route but are prone to delays.

The Afram river lies to the south of Pepease, but access is limited.

The distance to Accra is about 196 km (122 mi), Accra (south Ghana), 198 km (123 mi), Accra - Kotoka Airport (ACC) (south Ghana), 173 km (107 mi), Ashanti region (south Ghana) 37 km (23 mi). Getting there involves a long drive since the nearest international airport, Accra-Kotoka Airport (ACC), is 195 km (121 mi) from the village of Pepease.

== People related to Pepease ==
- Shirley Frimpong-Manso
