= Abetifi (Ghana parliament constituency) =

Ghana parliament constituency

- constituency for the Parliament of Ghana
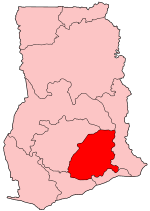
- District: Kwahu East District
- Region: Eastern Region of Ghana

Current constituency
- Party: New Patriotic Party
- MP: Bryan Acheampong

The Abetifi constituency is in the Eastern region of Ghana. It is situated within the Kwahu East District. The Abetifi constituency is the administrative capital of the Kwahu East District. It is linked up with many Districts and this promotes commercial activities among the District capitals and other nearby communities. The current member of Parliament for the constituency is Bryan Acheampong. He was elected on the ticket of the New Patriotic Party (NPP) and won a majority of 9,724 votes more than candidate closest in the race, to win the constituency election to become the MP. He succeeded Peter Wiafe Pepera who had represented the constituency in the 5th Republican parliament on the ticket of the New Patriotic Party (NPP).

== Members of Parliament ==
First elected	Member	Party
First Republic
1965	Benjamin Kofi Asamoah	Convention People's Party
Second Republic
1969	Emmanuel Kwadwo Adu	Progress Party
Third Republic
1979	Emmanuel Kwadwo Adu	Popular Front Party
Fourth Republic
1992	Opoku Preko	National Convention Party
1996	Eugene Atta Agyepong	New Patriotic Party
2008	Peter Wiafe Pepera	New Patriotic Party
2016	Bryan Acheampong	New Patriotic Party

== Elections ==
2024 Ghanaian general election: Abetifi
Party	Candidate	Votes	%	±%
NPP	Bryan Acheampong	22,287	72.77%	
NDC	Addo Isaac Amoafo	8,338	27.23%	
Majority		15,949	45.54	
Turnout		30,856		—
Registered electors		48,720		

2020 Ghanaian general election: Abetifi Source: 3news
Party	Candidate	Votes	%	±%
New Patriotic Party	Bryan Achemapong	25,035	72.42%	
National Democratic Congress	Asamoah Samuel	9,536	27.58%	

2016 Ghanaian general election: Abetifi Source:Ghanaweb
Party	Candidate	Votes	%	±%
New Patriotic Party	Bryan Achemapong	23,432	74.61	
National Democratic Congress	Emmanuel Tabi	7,975	25.39	
Majority				
Turnout		31,407	—	—

2012 Ghanaian parliamentary election: Abetifi Source:GhanaWeb
Party	Candidate	Votes	%	±%
New Patriotic Party	Simon Edem Asimah	20,766	63.84	
Progressive People's Party	Samuel Asamoah	11,764	36.16	—
Majority				
Turnout		32,530		—

2008 Ghanaian parliamentary election: Abetifi Source:Ghana Home Page
Party	Candidate	Votes	%	±%
New Patriotic Party	Peter Wiafe Pepera			
				—
Majority				
Turnout				—

2004 Ghanaian parliamentary election:Abetifi Source: Ghana Home Page
Party	Candidate	Votes	%	±%
New Patriotic Party	Eugene Atta Agyepong			
				—
Majority				
Turnout				—

2000 Ghanaian parliamentary election:Abetifi Source:GhanaWeb
Party	Candidate	Votes	%	±%
New Patriotic Party	Eugene Atta Agyepong			
				—
Majority				

1996 Ghanaian parliamentary election:Abetifi Source:Electoral Commission of Ghana
Party	Candidate	Votes	%	±%
New Patriotic Party	Eugene Atta Agyepong			—
				—
Majority				—
Turnout				—

1992 Ghanaian parliamentary election:Abetifi Source:Electoral Commission of Ghana
Party	Candidate	Votes	%	±%
National Convention Party	Opoku Preko			—
				—
Majority				—
Turnout				—

== See also ==
- List of Ghana Parliament constituencies
