= Abuorso (Eastern Region) =

Community in Eastern Region, Ghana

- Town
- Country: Ghana
- Region: Eastern Region
- District: Fanteakwa North District
- Time zone: GMT
  - Summer (DST): GMT

Abuorso is a farming community in the Fanteakwa North District in the Eastern Region of Ghana. It is a town where phone signals are accessed under a tree because of unreliable mobile network coverage. It is located about 25 km from Begoro.

== Institutions ==
- Abourso CHPs
