= Asamoah =

Asamoah is a prominent last name of the Akan tribe in West Africa, primarily located in Ghana. It is derived from "Asomafo" in the twi (chwee) language, meaning "apostles." In Twi, "Asoma" is the verb "to send" and "fo" means people, so the literal translation is "sent people." The family name grew with the rise of Christianity in the *Ashanti Empire and later Gold Coast which are the forerunners to modern Ghana. It is originally pronounced with three syllables "a-sah-muah" but the lack of the twi vowel "ɔ" in many scripts has led to the four syllable pronunciation "a-sa-mo-ah" in western culture.

- Alex Asamoah (born 1986), Ghanaian footballer
- Benjamin Kofi Asamoah (1917–1992), Ghanaian politician
- Brian Asamoah (born 2000), American football player
- Charles Asamoah (born 1985), Ghanaian footballer
- Comfort Asamoah, Ghanaian politician
- Derek Asamoah (born 1981), Ghanaian footballer
- Eric Asamoah-Frimpong (born 1990), Ghanaian footballer
- Gerald Asamoah (born 1978), Ghanaian-born German footballer
- George Asamoah (born 1997), Ghanaian professional footballer
- Gyan Asamoah (born 1985), Ghanaian footballer
- Joetex Asamoah Frimpong (born 1982), Ghanaian footballer
- Jon Asamoah (born 1988), American football player
- Kwadwo Asamoah (born 1988), Ghanaian professional and international footballer
- Michael Asamoah (born 1996), Ghanaian professional footballer
- Nathaniel Asamoah (born 1990), Ghanaian professional footballer
- Obed Asamoah (born 1936), Ghanaian politician
- Simon Appiah Asamoah (born 2002), Ghanaian footballer
