= Abuorso =

Abuorso may refer to the following places in Ghana:

- Abuorso (Eastern Region)
- Abuorso (Bono East Region)
