= Fanteakwa North (Ghana parliament constituency) =

Constituency in Ghana

- constituency for the Parliament of Ghana
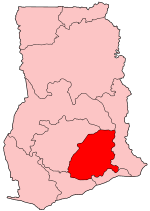
- District: Fanteakwa District
- Region: Eastern Region of Ghana

Current constituency
- Party: New Patriotic Party
- MP: Kwame Appiah Kodua

Fanteakwa North is one of the constituencies represented in the Parliament of Ghana. It elects one Member of Parliament (MP) by the first past the post system of election. Fanteakwa North is located in the Fanteakwa District of the Eastern Region of Ghana. Its current member of parliament is Kwame Appiah Kodua.

== Boundaries ==
The constituency is located within the Fanteakwa District of the Eastern Region of Ghana.

== Members of Parliament ==
Election	Member	Votes	Party
2004			
2008			
2012			
2016	Kwabena Amankwah Asiamah	11,380	NPP
2020			
2024	Kwame Appiah Kodua	11,751	NPP

2016 Ghanaian general election: Fanteakwa North Source: Peacefmonline
Party	Candidates	Votes	%
NPP	Kwabena Amankwah Asiamah	11,380	53.04
NDC	Abass Fuseini Sbaabe	9,472	44.15
PPP	Nkansah Amos	483	2.25
CPP	Ohene Nyarko Solomon	121	0.56

== See also ==
- List of Ghana Parliament constituencies
- List of political parties in Ghana
