= Bepong, Ghana =

Bepong
- Town
- Location of Bepong in Eastern Region (Ghana)
- Coordinates: 6°36′N 0°43′W
- Country: Ghana
- Region: Eastern
- District: Kwahu South District
- Elevation: 1,611 ft (491 m)

Population
  - Demonym: Beponger
- Time zone: GMT
  - Summer (DST): GMT

Bepong is a major town in Kwahu South district, in Eastern Ghana.
