= Oboo, Ghana =

Obo
- Town
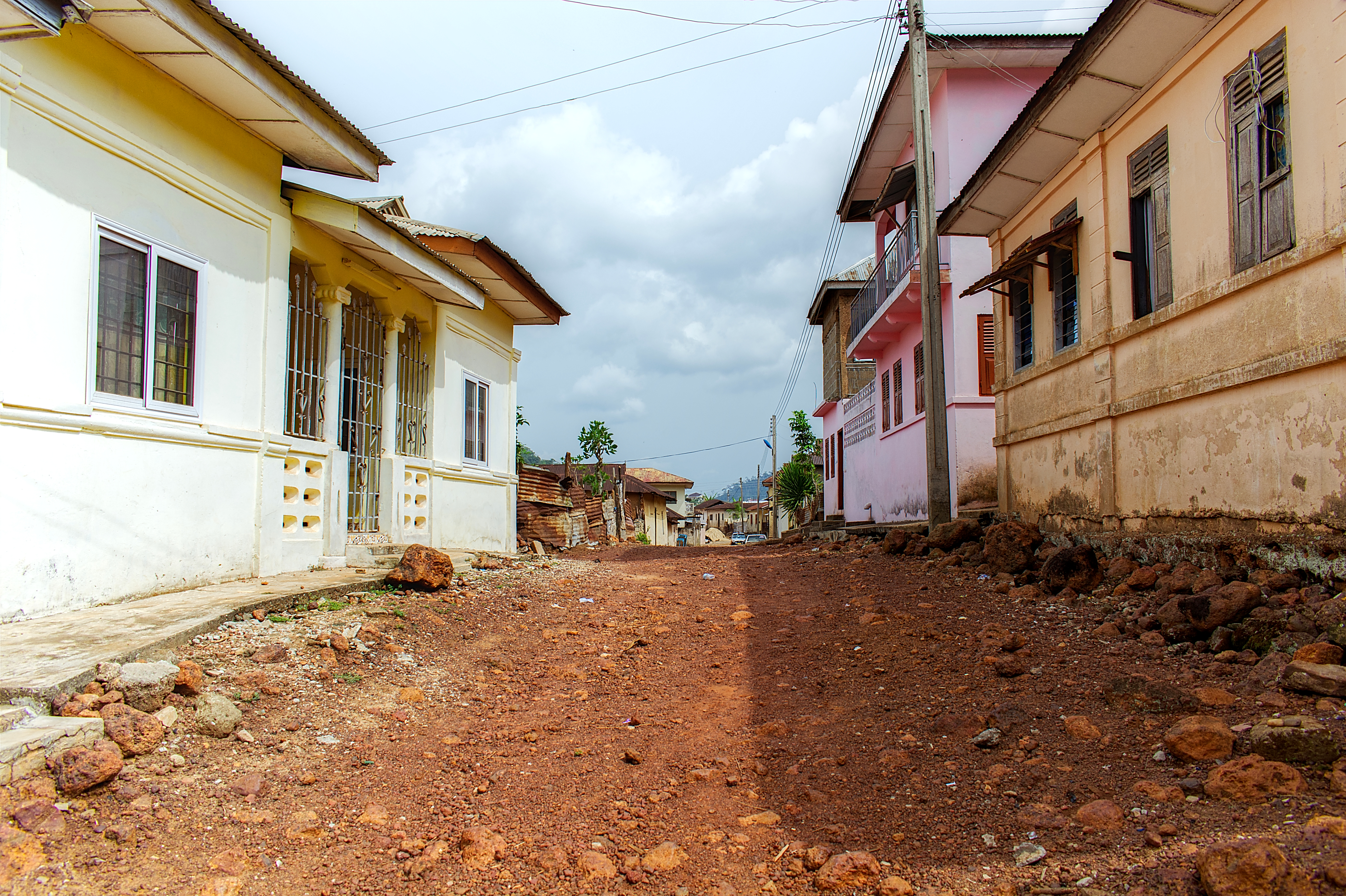
- A neighborhood in Oboo

- Location of Oboo in Eastern Region (Ghana)
- Coordinates: 6°36′N 0°46′W
- Country: Ghana
- Region: Eastern
- District: Kwahu South District
- Elevation: 2,290 ft (698 m)

Population
  - Demonym: Obooan
- Time zone: GMT
  - Summer (DST): GMT

Obo is a small town in the Kwahu South district in Eastern Ghana.
