= Opoku Preko =

Ghanaian politician (born 1943)

Member of Parliament for Abetifi
- President: John Kufour
- Parliamentary group: National Convention Party

Personal details
- Born: 18 August 1943 (age 83)
- Education: National School of Salesmanship in Manchester
- Occupation: Salesman

Opoku Preko is a Ghanaian politician and member of the first parliament of the fourth republic of Ghana representing Abetifi constituency under the membership of the National Convention Party (NCP).

== Early life and education ==
Opoku was born on 18 August 1943. He attended National School of Salesmanship in Manchester where he obtained his Diploma in Modern Salesmanship. He worked as a Salesman before going into parliament.

== Personal life ==
Opoku Preko is a Christian.

== Politics ==
He began his political career in 1992 when he became the parliamentary candidate for the National Democratic Congress (NDC) to represent his constituency in the Eastern Region of Ghana prior to the commencement of the 1992 Ghanaian parliamentary election.

He was sworn into the First Parliament of the Fourth Republic of Ghana on 7 January 1993, after being pronounced winner at the 1992 Ghanaian election held on 29 December 1992.

After serving his four years tenure in office, Opoku lost his seat to his counterpart in the New Patriotic Party (NPP), Eugene Atta Agyepong. He defeated Peter Kwasi Wiafe Peprah of the National Democratic Congress (NDC) who polled 10,598 votes representing 27.90% of the total valid votes cast, Akua Konadu of the National Independence Party (INP) who polled 2,299 votes representing 6.10% of the total valid votes cast, Kwabena Osei Ntiri of the Convention People's Party (CPP) who polled 2,149 votes representing 5.70% of the total valid votes cast and Prince Opoku of the People's National Convention who polled 310 votes representing 0.80% of the total votes cast at the 1996 Ghanaian general elections. Eugene polled 14,089 votes which was equivalent to 37.10% of the total valid votes cast. He was thereafter elected on 7 January 1997.
