= Benjamin Kofi Asamoah =

Ghanaian politician (1917–1992)

Member of the Ghana Parliament for Abetifi
- In office 1965–1966
- Preceded by: New
- Succeeded by: Emmanuel Kwadwo Adu

Personal details
- Born: Benjamin Kofi Asamoah; 30 March 1917 Abetifi, Eastern Region, Gold Coast
- Died: 1992 (aged 73–74)
- Party: Convention People's Party
- Occupation: Politician
- Profession: Police officer

Benjamin Kofi Asamoah (30 March 1917 – 1992) was a Ghanaian politician in first republic. He was the member of parliament for the Abetifi constituency from 1965 to 1966. Prior to entering parliament he was the District Commissioner for the Kwahu district and the New Juaben District. He also served as the Eastern Regional Secretary for the Convention People's Party.

== Early life and education ==
Asamoah was born on 30 March 1917 at Abetifi, a town in the Eastern Region. He had his education at the Juaso Government Middle Senior School.

== Career and politics ==
Asamoah begun his career as a Winch driver from 1935 to 1940. He joined the police force in 1941 and worked as a police constable from 1941 to 1946. In 1948 he became the first chairman of the Kwahu District branch of the United Gold Coast Convention but joined the Convention People's Party in 1950. On 1 July 1959 he was appointed District Commissioner for the Kwahu District and on 1 December 1960 he was transferred to Koforidua as the District Commissioner for the New Juaben District. In 1965 he was appointed Member of parliament for the Abetifi constituency. He served in this capacity until February 1966 when the Nkrumah government was overthrown.

== Personal life and death ==
Asamoah's hobbies included farming and hunting. He died in 1992.

== See also ==
- List of MPs elected in the 1965 Ghanaian parliamentary election
