= Fanteakwa South District =

District in Eastern Region, Ghana

- District
- Districts of Eastern Region

- Location of Fanteakwa South District within Eastern
- Coordinates: 6°21′N 0°29′W
- Country: Ghana
- Region: Eastern
- Capital: Osino

Population (2021)
  - Total: 54,634
- Time zone: UTC+0 (GMT)

Fanteakwa South District is one of the thirty-three districts in Eastern Region, Ghana. It was originally part of the then-larger Fanteakwa District in 1988, which was created from the former East Akim District Council, until the southern part of the district was split off to create Fanteakwa South District on 15 March 2018; thus the remaining part has been renamed as Fanteakwa North District. The district assembly is located in the central part of Eastern Region and has Osino as its capital town.
