= Obuoba J.A. Adofo =

Ghanaian highlife musician (born 1952)

- Also known as: Black Chinese
- Born: Jackson Alfred Adofo; August 4, 1952 (age 74)
- Origin: Kwahu, Eastern Region (Ghana)
- Genre: Highlife
- Occupations: Musician, songwriter, guitarist
- Years active: 1970s-present

Obuoba J.A. Adofo (born circa 1952) is a well-known Ghanaian highlife musician, famous for his meaningful lyrics and unique voice. He led the City Boys Band and earned the nickname "Black Chinese" because of his distinctive appearance. His music has been popular in Ghana since the 1970s.

== Early life and musical start ==
J.A. Adofo began his music career in the early 1970s at the age of 22. He was inspired by his relative, the late Nana Kwame Ampadu, a legendary highlife musician. Adofo admired how people celebrated Ampadu and wanted to experience the same admiration. He listened to Ampadu’s songs and used similar beats to compose his first track, "Odo Nndidi Ntwen Me," even before finishing school. He chose to focus on love songs to stand out from other musicians who sang about life issues or death.

== Career and achievements ==
Throughout his career, Adofo released many hit songs, including "Yaa Boatemaa," "Ankwanobi," "Owu Mpaso," "Akutiabo," and "Nya Asem Hwe." He has over 30 albums to his credit and has performed live shows that were often sold out. In 2019, he received the Vodafone Ghana Music Awards Lifetime Achievement Award for his contributions to highlife music.

== Personal reflections ==
Adofo has expressed regret over bleaching his skin during his youth, a decision influenced by societal pressures to appear successful. He later realized the health risks and the contradiction it posed to his role in promoting African culture through music.

== Legacy ==
J.A. Adofo's music continues to influence new generations. In 2024, a 10-year-old contestant named Heartwell Akuffo performed Adofo's song "Yaa Boatemaa" on the TV show Nsoromma, receiving a standing ovation from the audience. His songs remain popular and are celebrated for their depth and cultural significance.

Adofo also advocates for quality control in the music industry, urging authorities and DJs to censor songs with inappropriate lyrics before playing them on the radio. He believes that maintaining high standards in music is essential for the betterment of society. Obuoba J.A. Adofo's dedication to highlife music and his thoughtful messages have left a lasting impact on Ghana's music scene.
