= Kwahu =

Area and group of people that live in Ghana

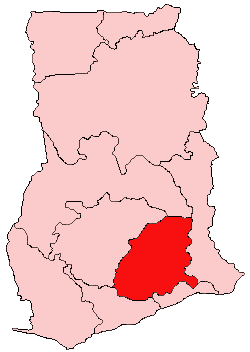

Kwahu or Kwawu is an area and group of people that live in Eastern region of Ghana and are part of the Twi-speaking Akan group. The region has been dubbed Asaase Aban, or the Natural Fortress, given its position as the highest habitable elevation in the country. Kwahu lies in the Eastern Region of Ghana, on the western shore of Lake Volta. The Kwahus share the Eastern Region with the Akyem and Akuapem, as well as the Adangbe-Krobos. Among Kwahu lands, a significant migrant population works as traders, farm-hands, fisherfolk, and caretakers in the fertile waterfront 'melting pot' of Afram plains. These migrants are mostly from the Northern and Volta Regions, as well as, some indigenous Guans from the bordering Oti and Brong-Ahafo regions live in the Afram Plains area. Kwahus are traditionally known to be wealthy traders, owning a significant number of businesses and industries in Ghana.

== History ==
The name Kwahu, according to historians, derives from its myths of origin, "The slave (akoa) died (wu)," which was based on an ancient prophecy that a slave would die so the wandering tribe of Akan would know where to settle. This resonates with the etymology of the Ba-wu-le (Baoulé) Akans of the Ivory Coast, whose Warrior Queen Awura Poku had to sacrifice her baby in order to cross the Komoe river. The myth was part of the historical stories of the Agona matriclan, the first paramount lineage of Kwawu, and was later adopted by the Bretuo-Tena matriclan (Twidan), who later replaced them. Other historians trace the name Kwahu to the dangers associated with making the mountainous terrain a habitat, as it became known as a destination of no return: go at your own peril or "ko wu" in the Twi language. This latter version is thought to have come either from their ancestral people in Mampong, who did not support fragmentation or from enemies who perished in trying to take the fight to the Kwahu in the treacherous mountains.

Kwahu people trace their origins to Adansi, like other forest Akan groups like the Akyem, Denkyira, Akwamu and Asantes. The first migration from Adansi happened long before the Asante Confederacy existed. Long before the Asante-Denkyira war of1699-1700, Nana Osei Twum, the first Chief Agonaman in the Adansi Morobem, his nephew Badu, his younger brother Kwasi Tititii and a slave Kofabra ("fetch it") together with Frempong Manso (who later founded Asante-Akyem stool land in the Asante Kingdom), Nana Ameyaw and Nana Adu Gyamfi, (founders of Asante Afidwase and Asante Gyamase respectively) fled from the cruelty of the King of Denkyira who had captured Adansi in about 1650, to find a new land. The group got divided, and the trekking Kwahu party led by Osei Twum moved up the mountains and stopped first at Dampong, whereupon Osei Twum and his party then moved on and discovered the Mpraeso Scarp. The trekking Kwahus continued to search for suitable land to settle. Thus, from Mount Apaku, where they first settled, they came across a stream with a rock in it shaped like a stone jar, and Osei Twum, interpreting this as a good omen, decided to settle there and called the place Obo-kuruwa or Bukuruwa, meaning stone jar. Another group from Mampong later settled in Kwahu. This is documented in K. Nkansah Kyeremateng's The Story of Kwawu.

The paramount king of Kwawu resides at Abene, north of Abetifi towards the Volta. The strategic location of Abene, along with a dreaded militia that guarded the route (led by Akwamu warriors), helped stave off attempts by colonial forces to capture the Omanhene. Till this day, the road from Abetifi to the small enclave housing the king is plied with some unease, given the stories recounted.

Before their leaders seized the opportunities presented with the signing of the Bond of 1844, Kwahu was an integral part of the Asante Kingdom, attested by available maps of the period. Asante would wage punitive and protracted wars against fellow Akans, including Denkyira, Akwamu, Akyem, Fante, Assin, but never fought Kwahu. Abetifi (Tena matriclan) is the head of the Adonten (vanguard). Obo (Aduana, Ada, Amoakade) is the head of the Nifa (Right Division) Aduamoa (Dwumuana, Asona) is the head of the Benkum (Left Division). Pepease is the head of the Kyidom or rear-guard division.

As part of the Asante Empire, Kwawu had an Asante emissary, governor or ambassador at Atibie, next to Mpraeso, of the Ekuona matriclan. To indicate its independence from Asante in 1888, the Kwawu assassinated the Asante emissary in Atibie, about the time of the arrival of the Basel missionaries from Switzerland. Fritz Ramseyer had been granted a few days of rest during a stop at Kwahu while en route to Kumasi with his captors. He recovered quickly from a bout of fever while in the mountains. Upon gaining his freedom later from the Asantehene, he sought permission to build a Christian Mission in Abetifi, thereby placing the town on the world map and opening the area to vocational and evangelical opportunities. Although it remains a small town, Abetifi still draws the reputation of a Centre of Excellence in Education with various institutions from the ground up. A Bernese country house built by Ramseyer, typical of the Swiss "Oberland", is well-kept and remains a symbol of early Christian Missionary Zeal. Obo, traditionally pro-Ashanti, led the opposition against the Swiss.

Until recently, Kwahus, in comparison to other Akan groups such as the Ashanti and Fanti, shunned political activism, preferring to engage in business and trading activities. They are therefore usually under-represented in government appointments.

== Eulogy ==
The spelling of "h" in this context is the official designation from the African Studies Centre at the University of Ghana and closely reflects the pronunciation. Swiss missionaries from Basel introduced the "h" to prevent the first syllable, "Kwa," from being pronounced as "eh". It's important to note that the "h" is not pronounced separately in the name. For Anglo-Germanic speakers, the pronunciation of "Ku-A-U" might be easier, while Francophone speakers will likely pronounce it as "KoU-AoU" without difficulty.

== Educational institutions ==
Kwahu has several educational institutions across all the towns and villages. The Presbyterian Church has a university and teachers' training college in the town of Abetifi. Presbyterian University College is also located in Kwahu. There are also two nursing training institutions at Nkawkaw, owned and managed by the Catholic Church and a government nursing school at Atibie.

Below are some of the many secondary schools in Kwahu.

- St Peter's Senior High School
- Kwahu Tafo Senior High School
- Nkawkaw Senior High School, Kawsec located at Nkawkaw.
- Atibie Nursing and Midwifery training college
- Kwahu Ridge. Senior High Technical
- Mpraeso Senior High School
- St. Paul's Senior High School, Asakraka
- Kwahu Tafo Senior High School
- Bepong Senior High School
- Nkwatia Presbyterian Senior High School
- St. Dominic's Senior High School
- Abetifi Secondary Technical School
- Abetifi Presbyterian Senior High School
- St. Joseph Technical School
- Amankwakrom Fisheries Agricultural Technical Institute, Afram Plains
- Donkorkrom Agricultural Senior High
- Mem-Chemfre Community Senior High School
- St. Mary's Vocational and Technical Institute, Afram Plains
- Maame Krobo Community. Day School,
- St. Fidelis Senior High and Technical School
- Fodoa Community Senior High School

== Economy ==
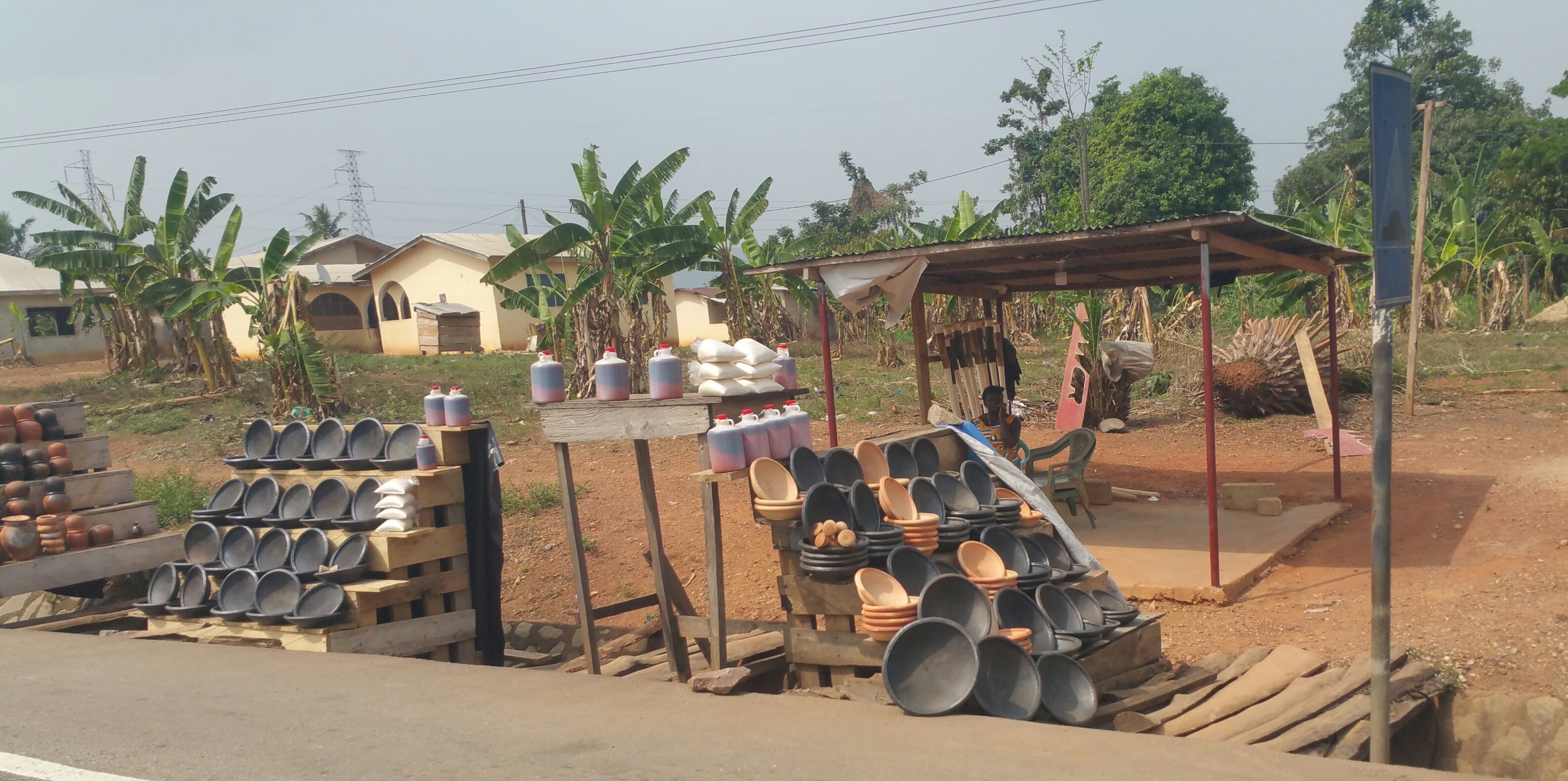
Sale of grinding bowls and pots at a pottery village in Kwahu.

The Kwahu, an Akan people living on the eastern border of Ashanti in Ghana, are well known for their business activities. An enquiry into the reasons for their predominance among the largest shopkeepers by turnover in Accra traced the history of Kwahu business activities back to the British-Ashanti War of 1874, when the Kwahu broke away from the Ashanti Confederacy, focusing on the rubber trade, which continued until 1914. Rubber was carried to the coast for sale, and fish, salt, and imported commodities, notably cloth, were sold on the return journey north. Other Kwahu activities at this time included trading in local products and African beads.

The development of cocoa in south-eastern Ghana provided opportunities for enterprising Kwahu traders to sell there the imported goods obtained at the coast. Previously, itinerant traders, the Kwahu began to settle for short periods in market towns. In the 1920s, the construction of the railway from Accra to Kumasi, growing road transportation, and the establishment of inland branches of the European firms reduced the price differences which had made trading inland so profitable. In the 1930s, the spread of the cocoa disease, swollen shoot, in the hitherto prosperous south-east, finally turned Kwahu traders' attention to Accra. Trading remained the most prestigious of Kwahu activities, and young men sought by whatever means they could to save the necessary capital to establish a shop. Recent developments indicate that this enterprising group of people can provide the new entrepreneurial organization or capital needed for sophisticated setups in a developing country. Within the last few decades, Kwahus have advanced their portfolios and ventured into the acquisition of bigger assets in the manufacturing, hotel industries and command an enviable leadership position in the building materials and pharmaceutical sectors. Kwahus probably own the most housing and commercial properties together with their Ashanti cousins in Accra and other Metropolitan Cities in the South of the country.

== Geography ==
Access into Kwahu begins from Kwahu Jejeti, which shares a boundary with Akyem Jejeti (both communities are joint but separated by the Brim river), which is roughly a 3-hour drive from the outskirts of Accra and approximately 140.9 km in distance. It lies midway in the road journey from Accra to Kumasi and serves as the gateway to a cluster of smaller towns set within the hills. Although the region doesn't have a lake or identical weather fauna, the mountainous profile resembles the Italian region overlooking Lago di Garda in Lombardy or the surroundings of Interlaken in Switzerland, with winding roads uphill towards Beatenberg. An aerial view of portions of the Allegheny Plateau in the United States provides another good description of Kwahu Country.

Temperatures may trail the normal readings for Accra and other cities of Ghana by up to 3 degrees at daytime and drop further at night, making the weather in Kwahu relatively cooler than its nearby counterparts. The Afram River collects the major drainage of the Plateau and makes a 100 km journey from Sekyere in Ashanti through Kwahu as a tributary to join the Volta Lake. Canoe fishing is big business along the vast shoreline and beyond the smaller expanse of water stretches, and the fertile grounds of the plains are a huge agricultural center.

== Health ==
- Kwahu Government Hospital

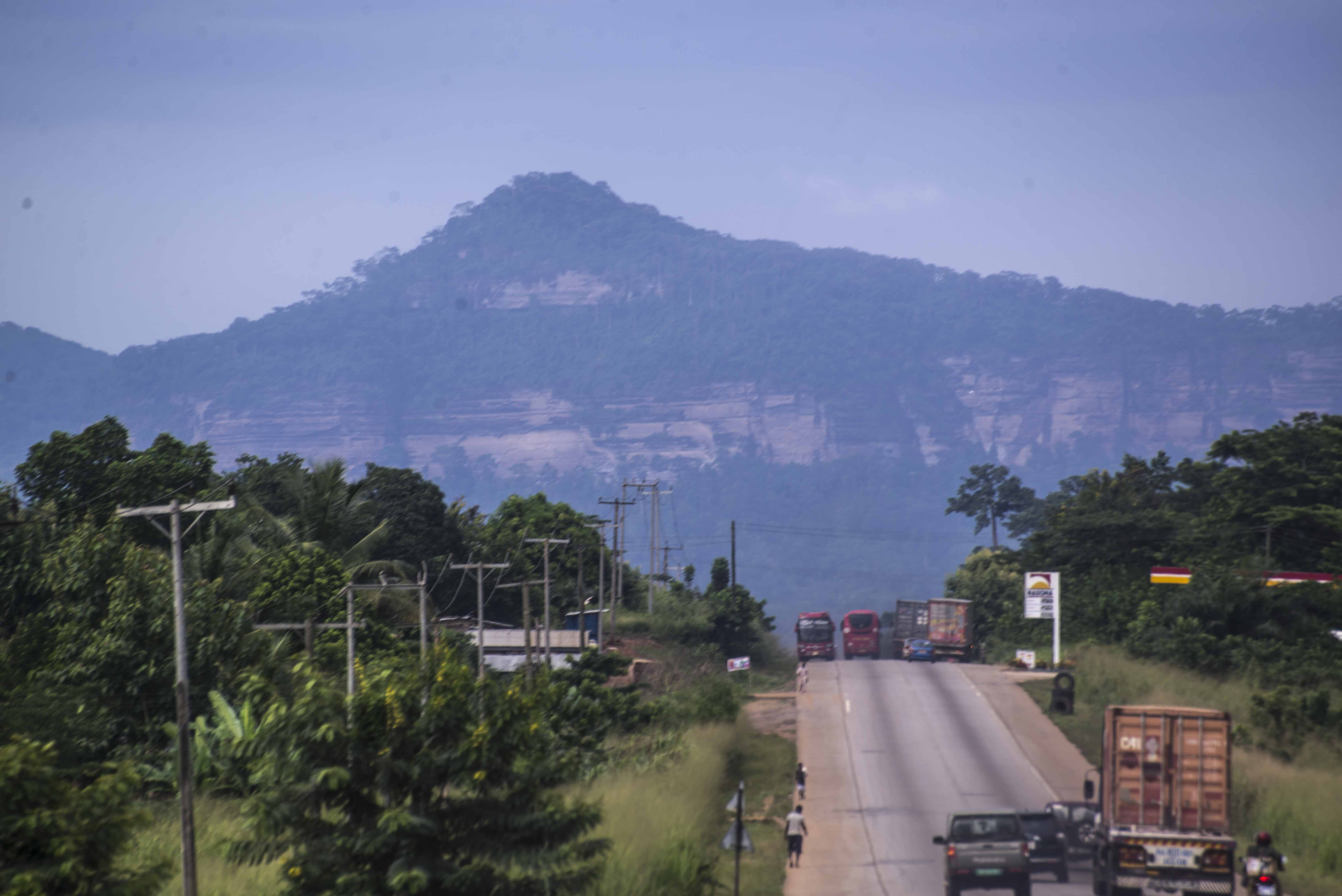

== Language and culture ==
The term Kwahu also refers to the variant of the Twi-Fante language spoken in this region by approximately 1,000,000 native speakers. Except for a few variations in stress, pronunciation, and syntax, there are no markers in the dialect of Akan spoken by the Kwahu versus their Ashanti or Akyem neighbours. Choice of words and names are pronounced closer to Akuapem Twi as in mukaase (Kitchen), Afua (a girl's given day name for Friday), mankani (cocoyam), etc., but not with the Akuapem tonation or accent. These three examples can quickly indicate the speaker's origin or source influence: Ashanti speakers would say gyaade, Afia and menkei, respectively.

Originally of Ashanti stock, oral history details the two-phased migration of the Kwahu from the Sekyere-Efidwase-Mampong ancestral lands through Asante-Akyem Hwidiem to arrive at Ankaase, which is today near the traditional capital of Abene, before spreading out to other settlements with clan members from peripheral Akyem and various parts of the Ashanti heartland. The group that first settled at Abene was led by (M)Ampong Agyei, who is accepted as the Founder of Kwahu. Historical material supports this view that connects the Kwahu to kinsmen who built their capital at Oda.

The fallout with Frimpong Manso, Chief of Akyem (Oda), triggered a second wave of migration, believed to have resulted from the refusal of Kwahu to swear an oath of allegiance, making them de facto subjects, upon arrival at Hwidiem. Unsuccessful incursions by the Oda Chief Atefa into Kwahu territory on the plateau would subsequently earn him the title "Okofrobour": one who takes the battle to the mountains. The jagged escarpment, however, made Kwahu inaccessible, hence the old humour meme 'Asaase Aban', signifying a naturally fortified and indestructible Kwahu Country.

If Ashanti Twi is by and large the refined language standard, it is appropriate to view Kwahu Twi as the precious stone from which the jeweller styles a gem. There is a certain purity of pronunciation, call it crude, with little effort to polish sounds: Kwahu speakers would opt for "Kawa" (a ring) and not "Kaa", "Barima" (Man) instead of "Berma" and pronounce "Oforiwaa" not "Foowaa". Another slight difference is the preference for full sentences among the Kwahu: "Wo ho te sɛn?" (How are you?) in place of the shorter "Ɛte sɛn?" in Ashanti; Other examples are "Wo bɛ ka sɛ / Asɛ" (you might say, looks like); Ye firi Ghana / Ye fi Ghana (We are from Ghana) and other minor name or word preferences, pronunciations, sentence length, etc. that usually pass unnoticed.

The Mamponghene, who is next to the Ashantehene in hierarchy, and the Kwahuhene are historical cousins, hence both occupy Silver Stools with the salutation Daasebre. The culture of the people of Kwahu does not differ from the larger Akan Group. Inheritance practice is matrilineal, and women hold office, own property and can enter into contracts without restrictions. Typical of fellow Akans, Fufu is a must-have main meal towards the close of day, prepared from Cassava or another Carbohydrate Tuber called Cocoyam and pounded with Plantains. It is served alongside a semi-thickened soup.

== 2024-26 Kwahu Chieftaincy Dispute ==
1. Lead Section The Kwahu Chieftaincy Dispute is an ongoing traditional and legal conflict regarding the legitimacy of the Kwahuhene (the Paramount Chief of the Kwahu Traditional Area). The dispute primarily centers on a challenge to the leadership of Daasebre Akuamoah Agyapong II and the subsequent attempted enstoolment of Baffour Akoto Osei as a rival claimant. As of early 2026, the matter is under adjudication by the Eastern Regional House of Chiefs and the High Court in Koforidua.

2. Background Reign of Agyapong II: Daasebre Akuamoah Agyapong II was enstooled in 2017. Destoolment Allegations: In late 2024, a faction of the Kwahu Traditional Council announced his "destoolment," citing various allegations, including his role as Board Chair of the Agricultural Development Bank (ADB).

3. Rival Claim and Enstoolment Enstoolment of Baffour Akoto Osei: In January 2025, a separate group of kingmakers from Abene enstooled Baffour Akoto Osei, a civil engineer, under the stool name Daasebre Akuamoah Boateng III. Traditional Council Split: The move created a divide within the traditional council, with some divisions supporting the new claimant and others remaining loyal to Agyapong II.

4. Legal Proceedings Eastern Regional House of Chiefs (ERHC) Injunction: On May 5, 2025, the ERHC Judicial Committee granted an interlocutory injunction restraining Baffour Akoto Osei from acting as Kwahuhene until the final determination of the case. 2026 Contempt Case: In February 2026, a contempt suit was filed against Osei at the Koforidua High Court for allegedly continuing traditional activities in defiance of the injunction.

== Notable people ==
- Edward Omane Boamah: Physician and former Minister for Communications of Ghana
- Obuoba J.A. Adofo: Ghanaian Higlife Musician
- Manaen Twum Ampadu: Former Flying officer
- KiDi: Ghanaian singer-songwriter
- Funny Face (Benson Nana Yaw Oduro Boateng): A comedian and actor
- Raphael Dwamena: Former Ghanaian Footballer

== Tourist attractions ==
- Abetifi Stone Age Park
- Bruku Shrine - Kwahu Tafo
- Oku Falls - Bokuruwa
- The Gaping Rock- Kotoso
- The Highest Habitable Point in Ghana - Abetifi
- Oworobong Water Falls - Oworobong
- Ramseyer Route - Abetifi
- The Padlock Rock - Akwasiho
- Nana Adjei Ampong Cave - Abene
- The Seat of Paramountcy - Abene.
- Afram River - Afram Plains

== Festivals ==
=== Paragliding Festival ===
The Ghana Tourism Authority in an attempt to promote domestic tourism, launched the Kwahu Easter Paragliding Festival at Atibie in Kwahu in 2005. This festival is an annual event which is held during every Easter in the month of April. During the event, seasoned pilots are invited to participate and thousands of people visit Odweano Mountain at Kwahu Atibie.

=== Akwasidaekese Festival ===
This is celebrated annually as the last Akwasidae of the year. The festival provides the community to commune and communicate with their ancestors, take stock of their activities as a people, plan for the coming years and thank God for His protection and provision over the years.

== See also ==
- Kwahu Easter
