= Kwabena Amankwa Asiamah =

Ghanaian politician

Hon Kwabena Amankwa Asiamah
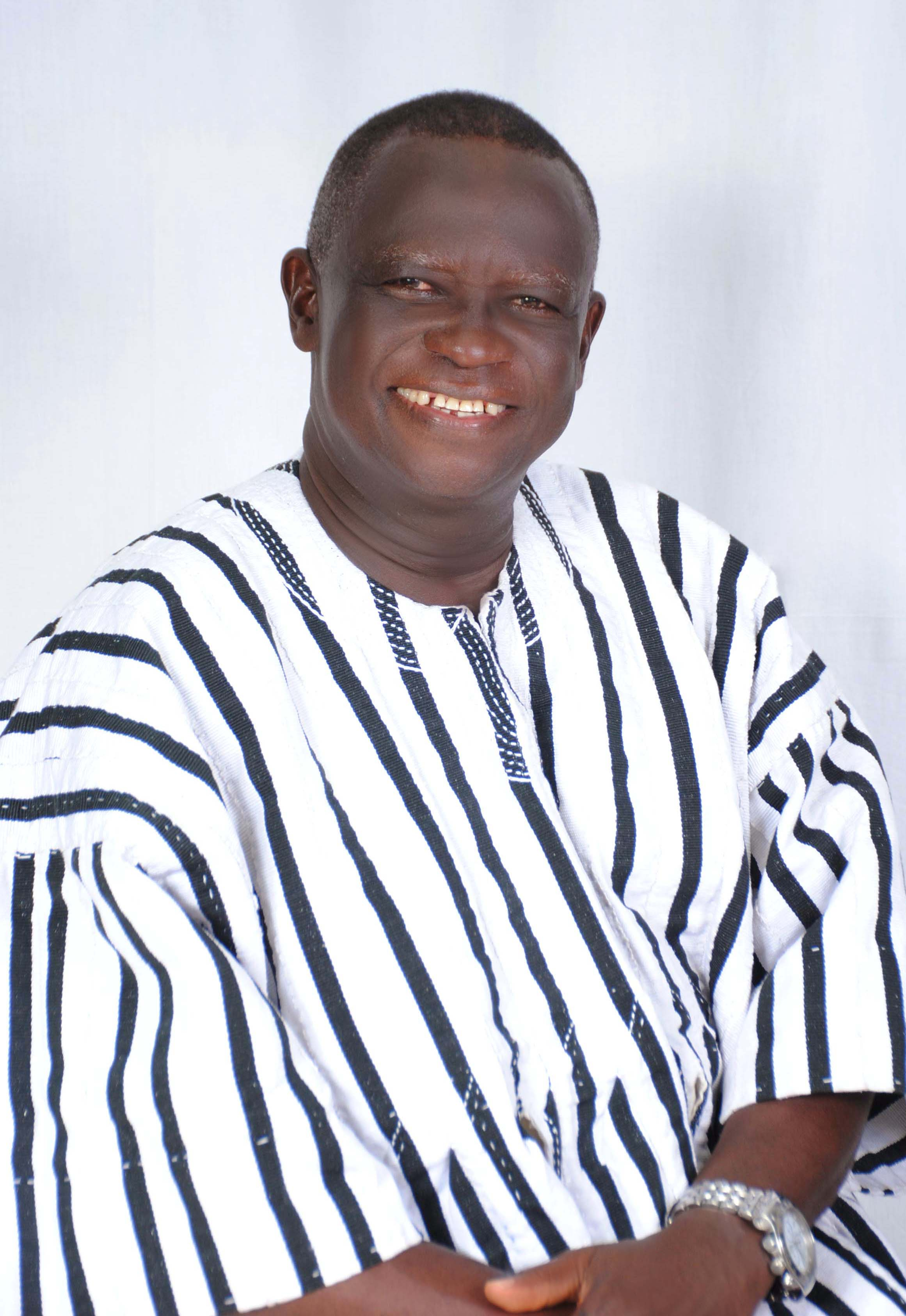

Member of the Ghana Parliament for Fanteakwa North
- Incumbent
- Assumed office 7 January 2021

Personal details
- Born: Kwabena Amankwa Asiamah; 28 August 1958 (age 67) Begoro
- Party: New Patriotic Party
- Occupation: Politician
- Committees: Education Committee, Gender and Children Committee, Communications Committee

Kwabena Amankwa Asiamah (born August 28, 1958) is a Ghanaian economist and politician. He is a member of the Seventh Parliament of the Fourth Republic of Ghana representing the Fanteakwa North Constituency in the Eastern Region on the ticket of the New Patriotic Party.

== Early life and education ==
Asiamah was born on August 28, 1958. He hails from Begoro, a town in the Eastern Region of Ghana. He graduated from University of Hull and obtained his Master of Business Administration degree in strategic management in 1999. He also holds an EMGL degree from the Ghana Institute of Management and Public Administration.

== Career ==
Asiamah is an economist and banker by profession. Before he became a Member of Parliament, he served as board chairman of Fanteakwa Rural Bank.

== Politics ==
Asiamah is a member of the New Patriotic Party (NPP). He was first elected into the Parliament of Ghana in January 2009, when he became a member of the Fifth Parliament of the Fourth Republic of Ghana. In December 2012, he contested again in the 2012 Ghanaian general election to retain his seat on the ticket of the NPP. He won and became a member of the Sixth Parliament of the Fourth Republic of Ghana. He won his poll again in the 2016 Ghanaian general election with 57% of the total votes and became a member of the current Seventh Parliament of the Fourth Republic of Ghana. He is the vice chairperson for the finance committee and he is also a committee member for Trade Industry and Tourism Committee.

== Personal life ==
Asiamah is a Christian (Presbyterian). He is married with seven children.
