= Kwahu District =

- Former District Council
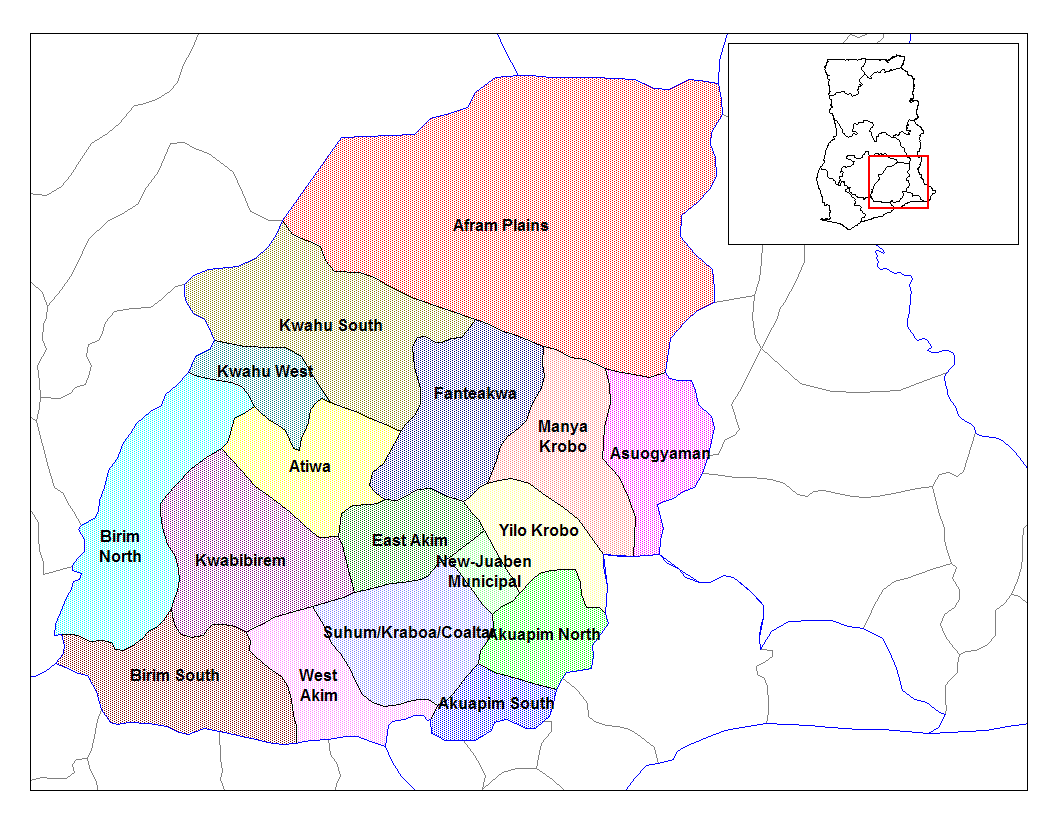
- Districts of Eastern Region

- Location of Kwahu District within Eastern
- Coordinates: 6°34′48″N 0°43′47″W
- Country: Ghana
- Region: Eastern
- Capital: Mpraeso
- Time zone: UTC+0 (GMT)

Kwahu District is a former district council that was located in Eastern Region, Ghana. Originally created as an ordinary district assembly in 1975. However, on 10 March 1989, it was split off into two new district assemblies: Kwahu South District (capital: Mpraeso) and Kwahu North District (capital: Donkorkrom). The district assembly was located in the northern part of Eastern Region and had Mpraeso as its capital town.
