= Fanteakwa District =

- Former District
- Seal

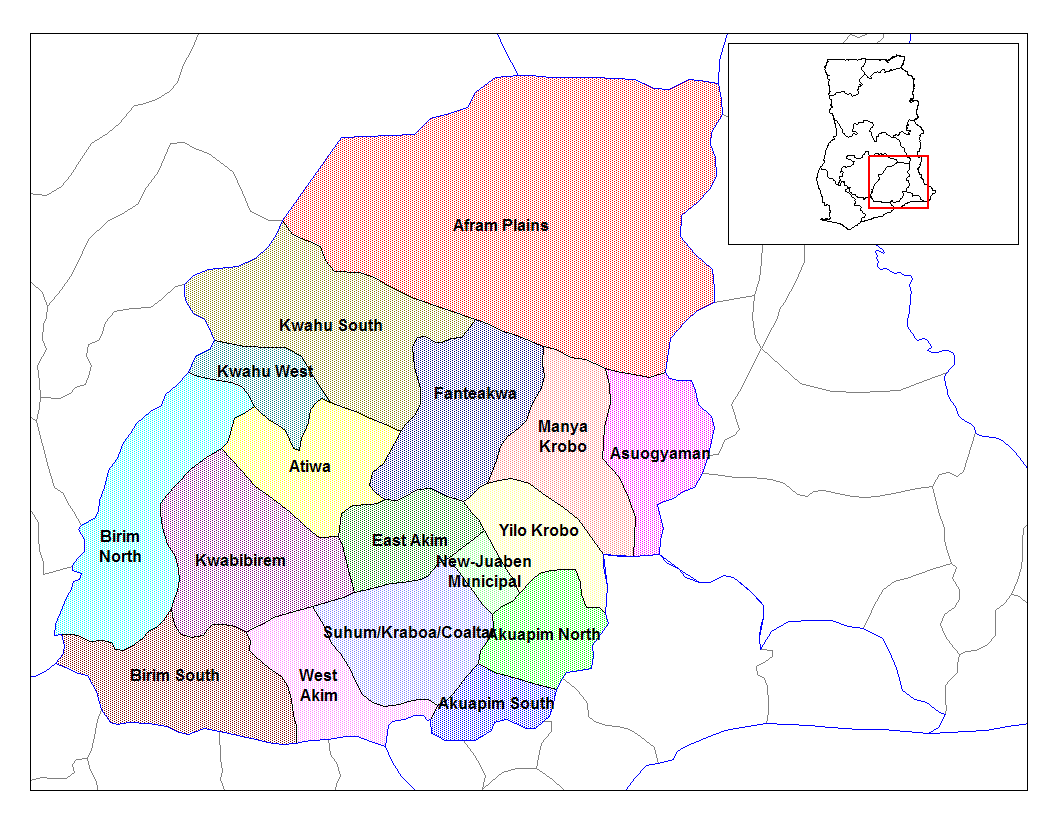
- Districts of Eastern Region

- Location of Fanteakwa District within Eastern
- Coordinates: 6°23′3.12″N 0°22′59.88″W
- Country: Ghana
- Region: Eastern
- Capital: Begoro

Government
  - District Executive: Ofoe Ceasar

Area
  - Total: 1,066 km^{2} (412 sq mi)

Population (2012)
  - Total: —
- Time zone: UTC+0 (GMT)

Fanteakwa District is a former district that was located in Eastern Region, Ghana. Originally created as an ordinary district assembly in 1988, which was created from the former East Akim District Council. However on 15 March 2018, it was split off into two new districts: Fanteakwa North District (capital: Begoro) and Fanteakwa South District (capital: Osino). The district assembly was located in the central part of Eastern Region and had Begoro as its capital town.

== List of settlements ==
Settlements of Fanteakwa District
No.	Settlement	Population	Population year
1	Abompe		
2	Adjeiikrom		
3	Akwadum Dorse		
4	Ahoniahoniaso		
5	Akyem Hemang		
6	Ayiensu		
7	Begoro	29,516	2013
8	Bepoase		
9	Bososo		
10	Bisibom		
11	Dedesoworako		
12	Dwenase		
13	Ehiamankyene-Odumase		
14	Juaso		
15	Nsutam		
16	Nteso No. 1 (Amokrom)		
17	Obooho		
18	Osino		
19	Saaman		
20	Summer		

== Sources ==
- "Fanteakwa District". Statoids.
- District: Fanteakwa District
- Fanteakwa Foundation
