= Atibie, Ghana =

Town in Eastern Region, Ghana

Atibie
- Town
- Location of Atibie in Eastern Ghana
- Coordinates: 6°35′N 0°44′W
- Country: Ghana
- Region: Eastern Ghana
- District: Kwahu South District
- Elevation: 1,562 ft (476 m)

Population
  - Ethnicity: Akan people
  - Demonym: Atibian
- Time zone: GMT
  - Summer (DST): GMT

Atibie is a small town in the Kwahu South District in the Eastern Region of Ghana. The Odweanoma Mountain is located along the Atibie road.

== Institutions ==
- Atibie Nursing and Midwifery Training College
- Atibie Hospital
