= Peter Wiafe Pepera =

Ghanaian politician

Hon. Peter Wiafe Pepera MP

Member of Ghanaian Parliament for Abetifi Constituency
- In office January 2009 – May 2016
- Succeeded by: Bryan Acheampong

Personal details
- Born: 9 May 1954 Ghana
- Died: 21 May 2016 (aged 62)
- Party: New Patriotic Party
- Education: University of Birmingham

Peter Wiafe Pepera (9 May 1954 - 21 May 2016) was a Ghanaian politician and a former Member of Parliament of Abetifi constituency in the Eastern Region of Ghana. He was a member of the New Patriotic Party of Ghana. He was succeeded by Bryan Acheampong.

== Personal life ==
Pepera was born on 9 May 1954. He hailed from Abetifi, a town in the Eastern Region of Ghana. He was an alumnus of the University of Birmingham, UK and obtained his Master of Science degree in systems engineering in 1980. He worked as managing director for Paramount Distilleries. He served as Member of Parliament from January 2009 until his death in 2016.

== Politics ==
He was a member of the National Democratic Congress in the 1990s until he defected to the New Patriotic Party in the 2000s. Whilst in the NDC, He served as deputy Minister of Trade and Industry under the Rawlings government.

Pepera was a member of the New Patriotic Party (NPP). He represented Abetifi Constituency in the 5th parliament of Ghana. In 2012, he contested for re-election into the Abetifi parliamentary office on the ticket of the NPP to represent in the sixth parliament of the fourth republic and he won. He was a member of the Committee of Privileges, House, Trade, Industry and Tourism

== Personal life ==
Pepera identified as a Christian and a Jedi.

== Death ==
He died on 21 May 2016, aged 62, at a hospital in Accra after a short illness, aged 62
