= Kwahu Easter =

Annual Easter celebrations in Kwahu, Ghana

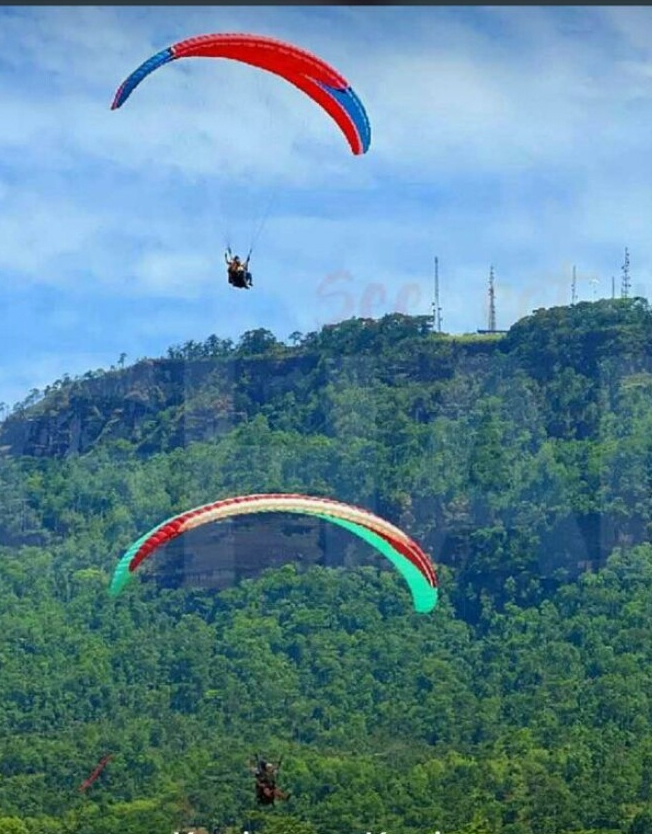
Paragliding at Kwahu

Kwahu Easter is the annual Easter celebrations at the Kwahu South District of the Eastern Region of Ghana. People from all walks of life and all nationality throng to the Kwahu Hills every Easter to celebrate the three-day-long holiday.

== Activities ==
Activities include paragliding, hiking, carnivals and street jams. For Kwahu people, it is an annual homecoming, but for holiday revelers it is an occasion for celebrations. There are also performances by various artists.

== Paragliding ==
In 2005 the Ministry of Tourism began a paragliding activity as part of the line up events for the Easter celebrations. Kwahu Easter is a place of interest where tourist visit, typically for its inherent or exhibited cultural value, historical significance, natural or built beauty, or amusement opportunities.

== Campaign ==
During Kwahu Easter, there is a community cleanup exercise which aims at promoting sanitation, environmental awareness and community spirit. The campaign drive is to set the whole environment ahead of the activities of the festival and to emphasize the essence of making the place healthier.
