= Kwahu South District =

Kwahu South Municipal Assembly
- District
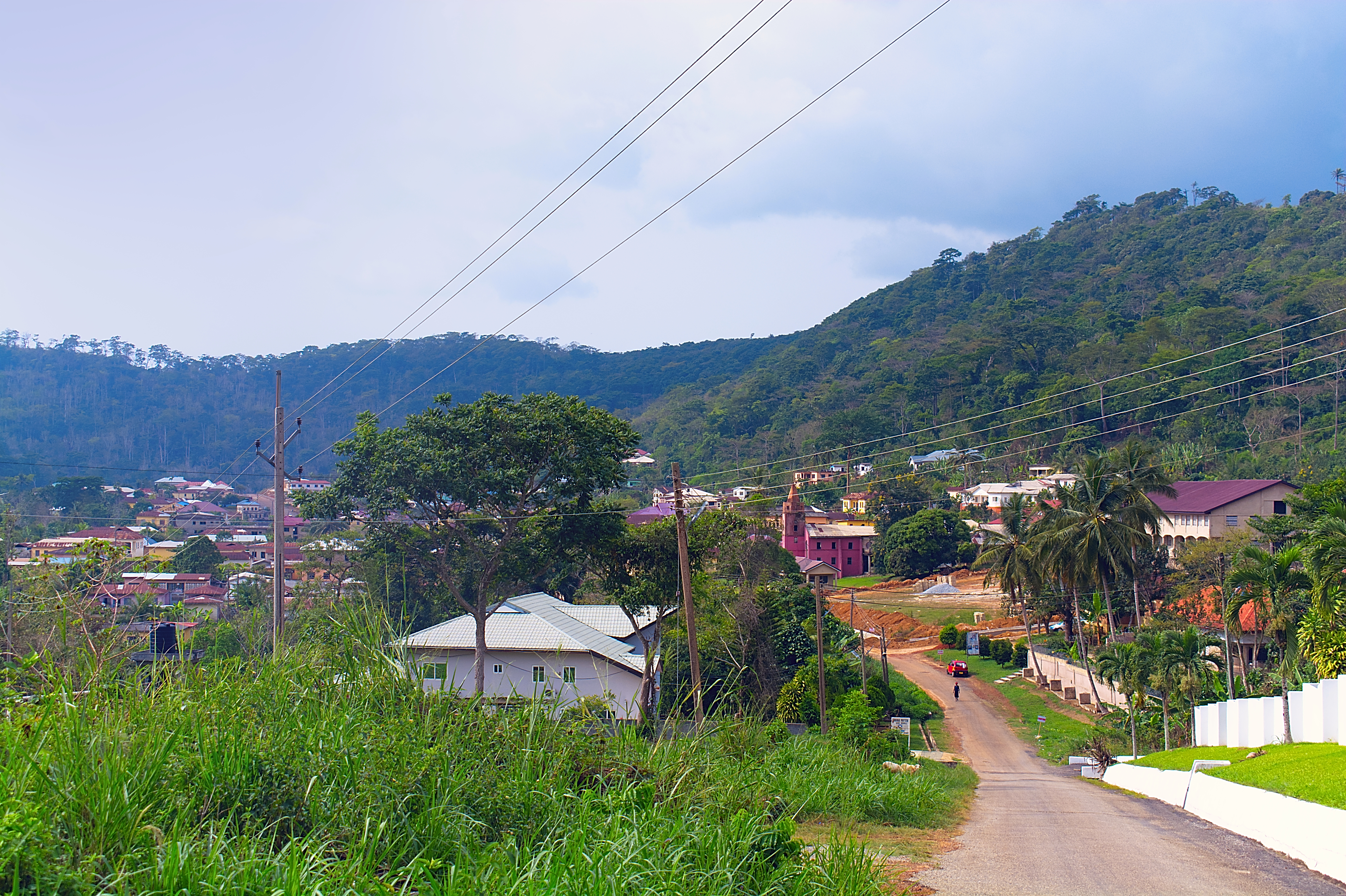
- Kwahu Twenedurase township

- Districts of Eastern Region

- Location of Kwahu South District within Eastern
- Coordinates: 6°34′48″N 0°43′47″W
- Country: Ghana
- Region: Eastern
- Capital: Mpraeso

Government
  - Municipal Chief Executive: Effah Osei Bonsu David

Area
  - Total: 1,462 km^{2} (564 sq mi)

Population (2021)
  - Total: 80,358
- Time zone: UTC+0 (GMT)
- Website: Official Website

Kwahu South District is one of the thirty-three districts in Eastern Region, Ghana. Created as an ordinary district assembly in 1988, it was created from the former Kwahu District Council. Later, the southwest part of the district was split off to create Kwahu West District in August 2004 (which later was elevated to municipal district assembly status on 1 July 2007 (effectively 29 February 2008) to become Kwahu West Municipal District); thus the remaining part has been retained as Kwahu South District. Then the northwest part of the district was split off to create Kwahu East District on 29 February 2008; thus the remaining part has been still retained as Kwahu South District. The district assembly is located in the western part of the Eastern Region and has Mpraeso as its capital town. The official website of Kwahu South Municipal Assembly is https://kwahusouth.gov.gh

== List of settlements ==
Kwahu South District also contains the small town of Atibie. The other main small towns of Kwahu South District include Bepong and Obo. Kwahu South District is popular for the Kwahu Easter holiday, at which time the Kwahu South District people are overcrowded.

Settlements of Kwahu South Municipal
No.	Settlement	Population	Population year
1	Aduamoa		
2	Akwaseho		
3	Asakraka		
4	Atibie		
5	Bepong		
6	Kotoso		
7	Kwahu-Adawso		
8	Kwahu Praso II		
9	Kwahu-Tafo		
10	Mpraeso	11,190	2013
11	New Oworobong		
12'	Nketepa		
13'	Oboo		
14'	Obomeng		
15	Sempoah		
16	Suminakese		
