= Obomeng =

Coordinates: 6°35′39″N 0°45′15″W

Obomeng is a small town in the Kwahu mountains in the Eastern Region (Ghana) in West Africa.

It falls under the Kwahu South District in elections. Obomeng previously was the first Kwahu town to see after climbing the mountain before the Atibie Road was constructed.
