= Bepoase (Ashanti Region) =

Community in Ashanti Region, Ghana

- Location in Ghana
- Coordinates: 7°05′06″N 1°33′43″W
- Country: Ghana
- Region: Ashanti Region
- District: Sekyere South District

Bepoase is a community in the Sekyere South District in the Ashanti Region of Ghana. It is located about 60 km north east of Kumasi. The residents are mostly farmers and kente weavers.

== Institutions ==
- Bepoase Islamic Primary School
- Bepoase Methodist School
- Bepoase Clinic
