= Bepoase (Eastern Region) =

Community in Eastern Region, Ghana

- Location in Ghana
- Country: Ghana
- Region: Eastern Region
- District: Ayensuano District

Bepoase is a community in the Ayensuano District formerly in the Fanteakwa District in the Eastern Region of Ghana.

== Institutions ==
- Bepoase Basic School
- Bepoase Police Station
