= Osino =

Town in Eastern Region, Ghana

- Town
- Location of Osino in Eastern Region (Ghana)
- Coordinates: 6°21′N 0°29′W
- Country: (Ghana)
- Region: Eastern Region (Ghana)
- District: Fanteakwa South District
- Time zone: GMT
  - Summer (DST): GMT

Osino is a town and the capital of Fanteakwa South district, of the Eastern region of Ghana, located on the Accra-Kumasi highway between Anyinam and Bunsu Junction. It is a semi-rural agrarian setting popular for the street-hawking of the sweetened boiled maize dough delicacy known as the "Osino Graphic".

The town is the location of the Osino Presbyterian Secondary Technical School and is known for the mining of gold. The school is a second-cycle institution.
