= Mpraeso =

- Town
- Location of Mpraeso in Eastern Region, Ghana
- Coordinates: 6°34′48″N 0°43′47″W
- Country: Ghana
- Region: Eastern Region
- District: Kwahu South District

Population (2013)
  - Total: 11,190
- Time zone: GMT
  - Summer (DST): GMT

Mpraeso is a town and the capital of Kwahu South district, a district in the Eastern Region of south Ghana, located at an altitude of 367 m on the Kwahu Plateau, which forms the south-west boundary of Lake Volta. Mpraeso has a 2013 settlement population of 11,190 people.

== Politics ==
Mpraeso is in the Mpreaso Constituency led by Hon. Davis Opoku Ansah, a member of the New Patriotic Party.

== Geography ==
The headwaters of the Pra River are near Twenedurase.

== Education ==
Mpraeso Secondary School (MPASS) is in Mpraeso .

== Mining ==
The discovery of Bauxite near Mpraeso, announced in 1924, led to the development of the Bauxite mining industry along the Volta River.

== Arts ==
Mpraeso is famous for manufacturing pottery, particularly for its grinding bowls: shallow dishes with strong, inverted rims and ridges on the interior used to grind vegetables using a small wooden pestle.
