= Begoro =

- Town
- Fanteakwa District logo

- Location of Begoro in Eastern Region, Ghana
- Coordinates: 6°23′N 0°23′W
- Country: Ghana
- Region: Eastern Region
- District: Fanteakwa North District

Population (2013)
  - Total: 48,516
- Time zone: GMT
  - Summer (DST): GMT

Begoro is a town and the capital of Fanteakwa North District, a district in the Eastern Region of south Ghana. Begoro has a settlement population of 48,516 people, in 2013.

== Geography ==
Begoro is about 150 km north of Accra, off the road joining Koforidua and Nkawkaw.

== Festival ==
Odwira festival also known as Ahwie.

== Twin towns and cities ==
List of sister cities of Fanteakwa, designated by Sister Cities International:

	Country	City	County / District / Region / State	Date	Ref.
(England)	England	York	North Yorkshire		

- Fanteakwa is linked with York, England, via the York Fanteakwa Community Link (YFCL).
