= Fanteakwa North District =

- District
- Districts of Eastern Region

- Location of Fanteakwa North District within Eastern
- Coordinates: 6°23′N 0°23′W
- Country: Ghana
- Region: Eastern
- Capital: Begoro

Population (2021)
  - Total: 56,987
- Time zone: UTC+0 (GMT)

Fanteakwa North District is one of the thirty-three districts in Eastern Region, Ghana. Originally it was formerly part of the then-larger Fanteakwa District in 1988, which was created from the former East Akim District Council, until the southern part of the district was split off to create Fanteakwa South District on 15 March 2018; thus the remaining part has been renamed as Fanteakwa North District. The district assembly is located in the central part of Eastern Region and has Begoro as its capital town.
