= Mpraeso (Ghana parliament constituency) =

Constituency in Ghana

- constituency for the Parliament of Ghana
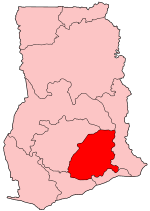
- District: Kwahu South District
- Region: Eastern Region of Ghana

Current constituency
- Party: New Patriotic Party
- MP: Davis Ansah Opoku

The Mpraeso constituency is in the Eastern region of Ghana. The current member of Parliament for the constituency is Davis Ansah Opoku. He was elected on the ticket of the New Patriotic Party (NPP) and won a majority of 73.56%, 25,064 votes more than the candidate closest in the race, to win the constituency election to become the MP. He succeeded Seth Kwame Acheampong who had represented the constituency from 2009 to 2021 in the 4th Republican parliament on the ticket of the New Patriotic Party (NPP).

== See also ==
- List of Ghana Parliament constituencies
