= Nkwatia Kwahu =

Nkwatia Kwahu Nkwatia
- Village
- Location of Nkwatia Kwahu in Eastern Region
- Coordinates: 6°38′N 0°44′W
- Country: Ghana
- Region: Eastern Region
- District: Kwahu East District
- Elevation: 1,614 ft (492 m)
- Time zone: GMT
  - Summer (DST): GMT

Nkwatia Kwahu is a town in the Kwahu East district, a district in the Eastern Region of southern Ghana. Nkwatia comes from the etymology 'nkwae' + 'tia' in the Kwahu Akan language. 'Nkwae' means 'forests', and 'tia' means 'short'. It is also the home of St. Peter's Boys Secondary School and Nkwatia Presbyterian Secondary School.

== Education ==
Nkwatia Kwahu is known for the Nkwatia Secondary School, St. Peter's Secondary School and Nkwatia Presby Secondary school (Nkwasco) The school is a second cycle institution. It is the largest town in the Kwahu East District.

== See also ==
- Kwahu East District
