= Kwahu East District =

- District
- Seal

- Districts of Eastern Region

- Location of Kwahu East District within Eastern
- Coordinates: 6°40′N 0°45′W
- Country: Ghana
- Region: Eastern
- Capital: Abetifi

Government
  - District Executive: Mr Agyapong

Population (2021)
  - Total: 79,726
- Time zone: UTC+0 (GMT)

Kwahu East District is one of the thirty-three districts in the Eastern Region, Ghana. Originally it was formerly part of the then-larger Kwahu South District in 1988, which was created from the former Kwahu District Council, until the northwest part of the district was split off to create Kwahu East District on 29 February 2008 (although it was announced by the NPP government led by president John Kufuor in October 2007). The district assembly is located in the western part of Eastern Region and has Abetifi as its capital town.

== List of settlements ==
Settlements of Kwahu East District
No.	Settlement	Population	Population year
1	Abene Dwerebease		
2	Abetifi		
3	Aduamoah		
4	Akwasiho		
5	Bokuruwa		
6	Hweehwee		
7	Kotoso		
8	Kwahu-Tafo		
9	Nkwantanan		
10	Nkwatia Kwahu		
11	Nteso		
12	Pepease		
13	Suminakese		
14	Tafo		
