= Abetifi =

Abetifi Highest Habitable Point In Ghana
- Town
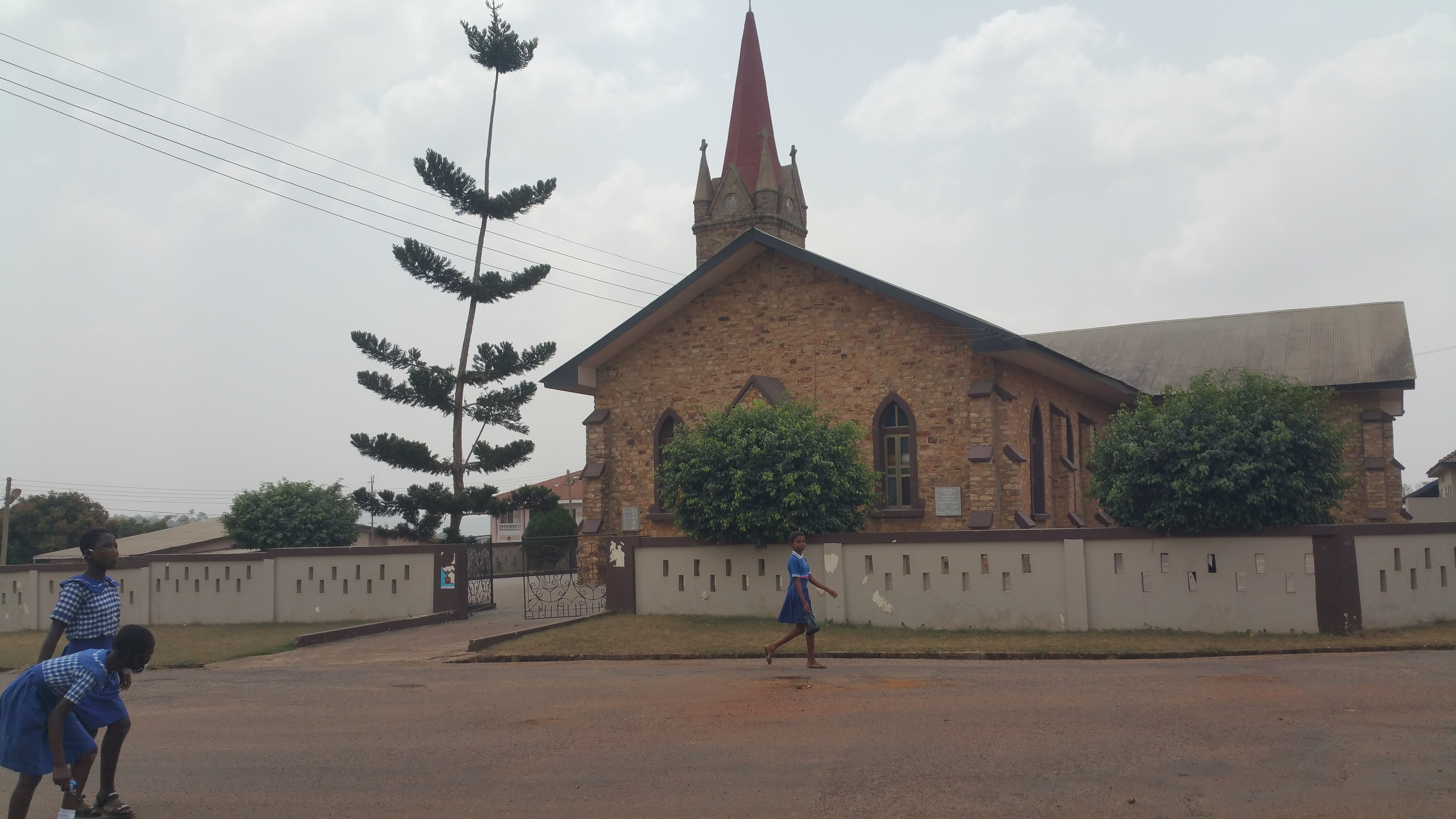
- Ramseyer Presbyterian chapel.

- Kwahu East District logo

- Location of Abetifi in Eastern Region, Ghana
- Coordinates: 6°40′N 0°45′W
- Country: Ghana
- Region: Eastern Region
- District: Kwahu East District
- Elevation: 1,972 ft (601 m)
- Time zone: GMT
  - Summer (DST): GMT

Abetifi is a small town in south Ghana and is the capital of Kwahu East district, a district in the Eastern Region of south Ghana.

== Climate ==
Climate data for Abetifi (1991–2020)
Month	Jan	Feb	Mar	Apr	May	Jun	Jul	Aug	Sep	Oct	Nov	Dec	Year
Record high °C (°F)	34.5 (94.1)	35.7 (96.3)	35.8 (96.4)	33.6 (92.5)	33.1 (91.6)	31.2 (88.2)	29.5 (85.1)	30.5 (86.9)	30.0 (86.0)	33.4 (92.1)	32.0 (89.6)	33.3 (91.9)	35.8 (96.4)
Mean daily maximum °C (°F)	30.3 (86.5)	31.6 (88.9)	31.1 (88.0)	30.2 (86.4)	29.1 (84.4)	27.5 (81.5)	26.3 (79.3)	26.2 (79.2)	26.9 (80.4)	28.0 (82.4)	29.2 (84.6)	29.4 (84.9)	28.8 (83.8)
Daily mean °C (°F)	25.8 (78.4)	26.7 (80.1)	26.5 (79.7)	26.0 (78.8)	25.3 (77.5)	24.2 (75.6)	23.2 (73.8)	23.0 (73.4)	23.6 (74.5)	24.4 (75.9)	25.2 (77.4)	25.5 (77.9)	24.9 (76.8)
Mean daily minimum °C (°F)	21.4 (70.5)	21.9 (71.4)	22.0 (71.6)	21.9 (71.4)	21.5 (70.7)	20.8 (69.4)	20.1 (68.2)	19.8 (67.6)	20.3 (68.5)	20.8 (69.4)	21.3 (70.3)	21.5 (70.7)	21.1 (70.0)
Record low °C (°F)	15.5 (59.9)	18.4 (65.1)	17.8 (64.0)	18.0 (64.4)	17.1 (62.8)	17.3 (63.1)	17.4 (63.3)	16.8 (62.2)	17.7 (63.9)	18.3 (64.9)	18.8 (65.8)	18.1 (64.6)	15.5 (59.9)
Average precipitation mm (inches)	18.7 (0.74)	35.8 (1.41)	133.7 (5.26)	139.4 (5.49)	156.8 (6.17)	205.4 (8.09)	96.8 (3.81)	64.2 (2.53)	181.2 (7.13)	174.3 (6.86)	46.3 (1.82)	26.4 (1.04)	1,279 (50.35)
Average precipitation days (≥ 1.0 mm)	1.4	2.8	8.0	9.9	11.4	13.9	8.2	6.5	13.5	12.9	4.1	2.1	94.7
Source: NOAA
