= Afram Plains North (Ghana parliament constituency) =

Ghana parliament constituency

Coordinates: 6°50′0″N 0°10′0″W

- constituency for the Parliament of Ghana
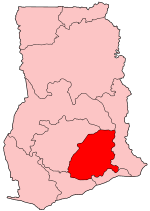
- District: Kwahu North District
- Region: Eastern Region of Ghana

Current constituency
- Party: National Democratic Congress
- MP: Worlase Kpeli

Afram Plains is in the Eastern region of Ghana and is divided into Kwahu Afram Plains North and Kwahu Afram Plains South Constituencies. The current member of Parliament for the Kwahu Afram Plains North constituency is Betty Nana Efua Krosby Mensah. She succeeded Emmanuel Aboagye Didieye. Joseph Appiah Boateng is also the current Member of Parliament for the Kwahu Afram Plains South.

== Members of Parliament ==
| First elected | Member | Party |
|---|---|---|
| 1996 | Krosbi Mensah | National Democratic Congress |
| 2000 | Joseph Tsatsu Agbenu | National Democratic Congress |
| 2004 | Joseph Tsatsu Agbenu | National Democratic Congress |
| 2008 | Emmanuel Aboagye Didieye | National Democratic Congress |
| 2012 | Emmanuel Aboagye Didieye | National Democratic Congress |
| 2016 | Betty Krosbi Mensah | National Democratic Congress |
| 2020 | Betty Krosbi Mensah | National Democratic Congress |

== See also ==
- List of Ghana Parliament constituencies
