= Krosbi =

Krosbi is a unisex name. Notable people with the name include:

- Betty Krosbi Mensah (born 1980), Ghanaian politician
- Krosbi Mensah (born 1947), Ghanaian politician
