= Lake Volta =

World's largest artificial reservoir by surface area, located in Ghana

Lake Volta Lac Volta
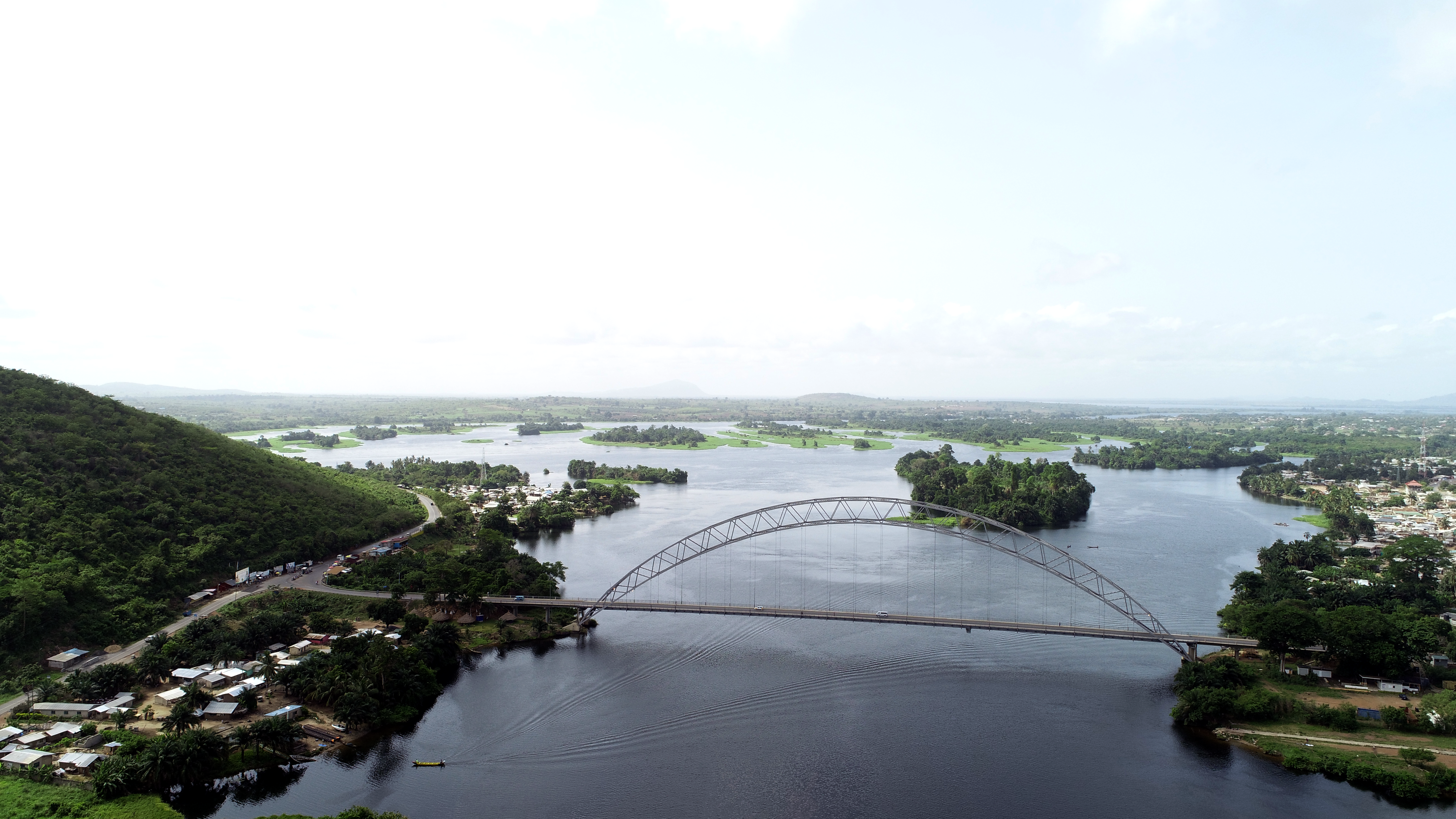
- View of Lake Volta and Adomi bridge

- Location within Ghana

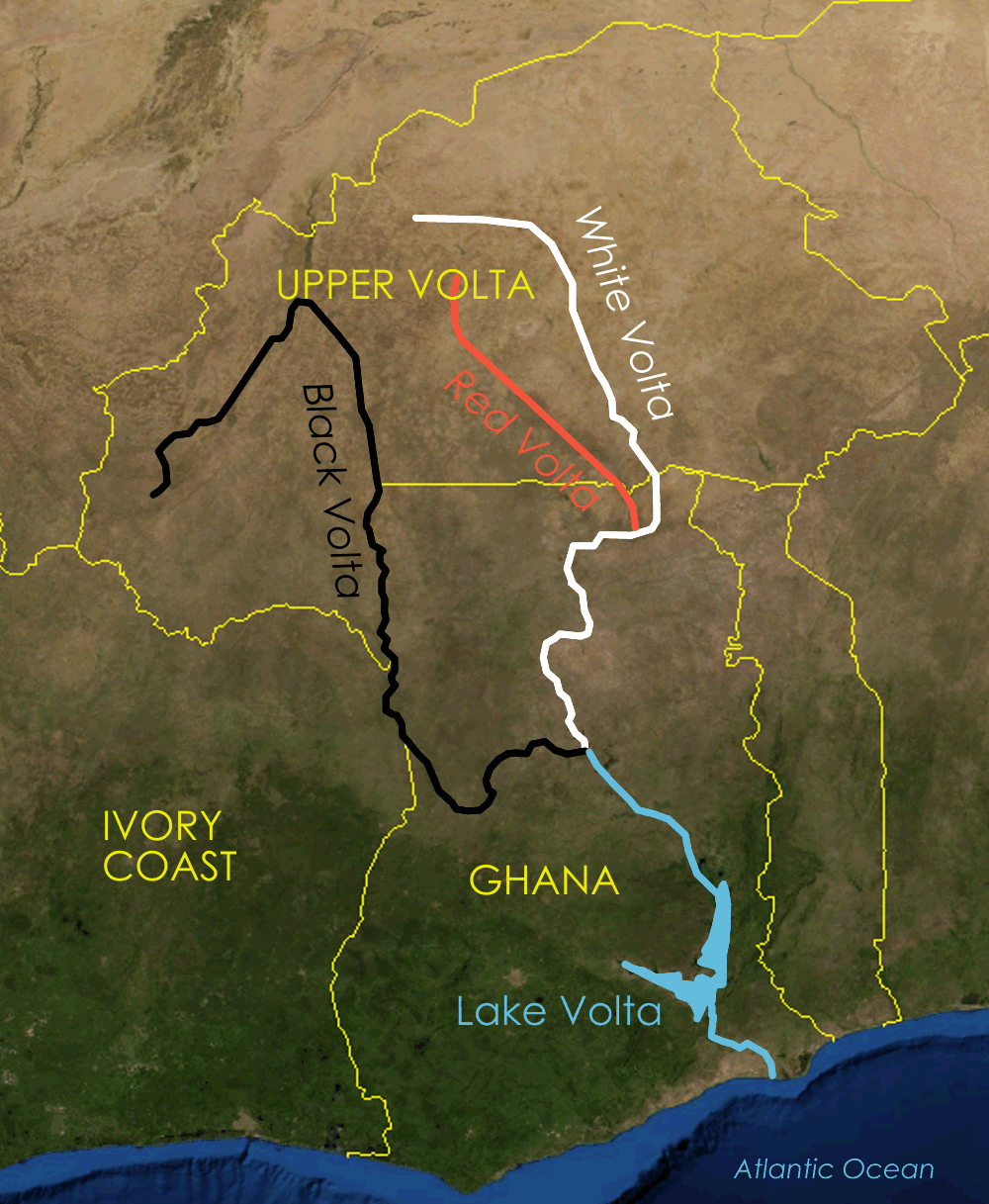
- Lake Volta in Ghana
- Location: Ghana, West Africa
- Coordinates: 6°30′N 0°0′E
- Lake type: Reservoir
- Primary inflows: White Volta River; Black Volta River
- Primary outflows: Volta River
- Catchment area: 385,180 km^{2} (148,720 sq mi)
- Basin countries: Ghana
- Surface area: 8,502 km^{2} (3,283 sq mi)
- Average depth: 18.8 m (61 ft 8 in)
- Max. depth: 75 m (246 ft)
- Water volume: 148 km^{3} (32.6 trillion gallons)
- Shore length^{1}: 4,800 kilometres (2,980 mi)
- Surface elevation: 85 m (279 ft)
- ^{1} Shore length is not a well-defined measure.

Lake Volta (French: Lac Volta), the largest artificial reservoir in the world by surface area, is contained behind the Akosombo Dam which generates a substantial amount of Ghana's electricity. It is completely within the country of Ghana and has a surface area of 8,502 square kilometres (3,283 sq mi). It extends from Akosombo in the south to the northern part of the country southwest of Tamale.

== Geography ==

Lake Volta lies along the prime meridian, six degrees north of the Equator. The lake's northernmost point is close to the town of Yapei, and its southernmost extreme is at the Akosombo Dam, 520 km (320 mi) downstream from Yapei. Akosombo dam holds back both the White Volta River and the Black Volta River, which formerly converged where the middle of the reservoir now lies, to form the single Volta River. The present Volta River flows from the outlets of the dam's powerhouse and spillways to the Atlantic Ocean in southern Ghana. The lake extends from north to south, stretching from northern region of ghana down to the Akosombo Dam in the South.

The main islands within the lake are Dodi, Dwarf, and Kporve. Digya National Park lies on part of the lake's western shore.

== History ==
The lake was formed by the Akosombo Dam, built between 1961 and 1965,, which was originally conceived by the geologist Albert Ernest Kitson during the British colonial period in 1915, to exploit the river's energy for smelting locally-sourced bauxite. The idea regained prominence at the end of the colonial era after World War II when Kwame Nkrumah became president of the Gold Coast colony, and began striving for modernization of the land. The British and local governments formed a joint preparatory commission, which concluded that over 60,000 people would need to be relocated. However, the commission also noted that the lake would boost opportunities for fishing, thereby helping to feed the population in the region. On the other hand, issues with water-related illnesses were predicted, such as malaria, trypanosomiasis, schistosomiasis, and onchocerciasis.

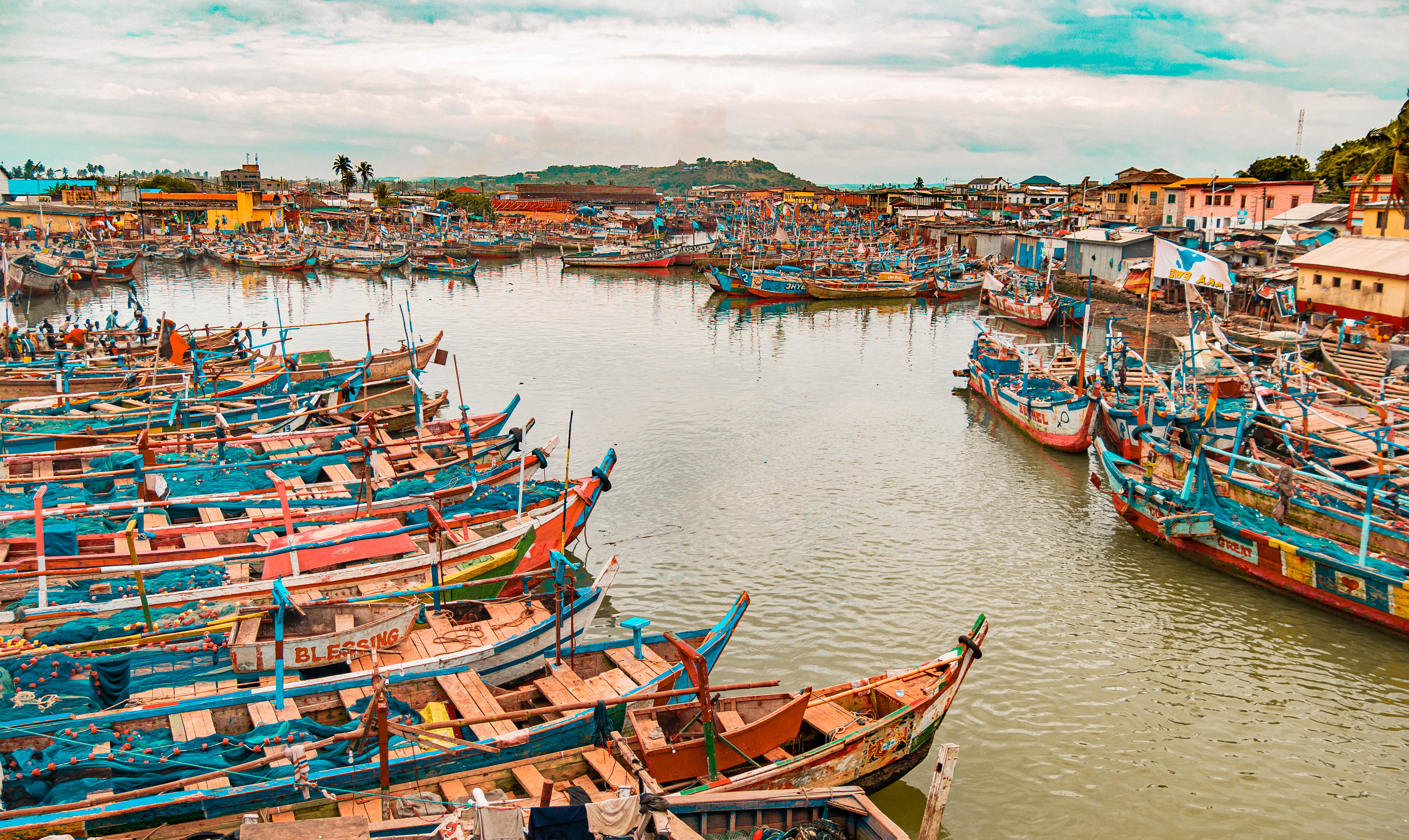
Fishing boats in one of the lakeshore communities

Aluminium Limited, the main industrial sponsor of the project, withdrew after Ghana became independent in 1957. Revised plans dropped the idea of an integrated aluminium industry and proposed smelting imported bauxite instead. Kaiser Aluminum entered the project at this point, and after protracted negotiations, funding for the project was secured, but now without regard to the residents of the impacted area as a cost-cutting measure. Construction thus began before the government started planning the resettlement. Soon after, a public agency was established, and organized construction of 52 replacement towns, which were envisaged to serve as a model for modernization and improving the livelihood of the local population. But because of the rush, the resettlement in 1964 turned out to be chaotic and inefficient. Poor organization caused significant hardship to the local population and led to the issues continuing long after the project's completion. Together, 15,000 homes in 740 villages were flooded, necessitating the resettlement of 78,000 people.

In the long run, the formation of the lake disrupted traditional fishing and farming practices in the region and caused a large spike in disease prevalence. Government-led modernization did not succeed, and people had to adapt to the new circumstances themselves. However, regional food production intensified in the decades after the construction of Akosombo dam, and the lake also opened a large navigable pathway to the north of the country and provided new opportunities for the development of tourism, which is gaining in prominence. On the other hand, the water level has been decreasing recently because of global warming, reducing power generation.

== Economy ==
The Akosombo Dam produces 912 MW of electricity for the country, as well as for export to Togo, Benin, and other nearby countries, thereby earning foreign exchange. Lake Volta is also important for transportation, providing a waterway for both ferries, and cargo watercraft. Since the huge lake lies in a tropical area, the water remains warm year-round naturally. Given good management, Lake Volta is the location of a vast population of fish and large fisheries.

The lake also attracts tourism, and tourist cruises visit the island of Dodi. Dodi Island has become a major tourist site in Ghana since its formation in 1961 following the construction of Lake Volta. In 2011, the Volta River Authority allocated US$2.5 million to develop Dodi Island’s eco-tourism potential through its hospitality subsidiary, Volta Hotels Limited.

Recent developments include a large-scale enterprise to harvest submerged timber from the flooded forests under Lake Volta. This project harvests high-value tropical hardwood without requiring additional logging or destruction of existing forest, and according to Wayne Dunn, "could generate the largest source of environmentally sustainable natural tropical hardwood in the world." In addition to generating foreign currency for the region and reducing the dependence of locals on fishing as a primary economic activity, the removal of submerged trees is improving navigation on the lake and increasing safety.

An estimated 7,000 to 10,000 children work in the fishing industry on Lake Volta. The nature of their employment has been described as slavery in The Guardian and by the CNN Freedom Project. This has been described as sensationalism by Betty Mensah, and the academic Samuel Okyere since many of the youth, whose wages are given upfront to their parents, grow up to become self-sufficient fishermen in adulthood who in turn hire children themselves and could therefore also be characterized as apprentices. They conclude that many children may suffer from exploitative work but are not enslaved.

== Disasters and safety incidents ==
On October 11, 2025, a boat accident occurred on Lake Volta near Kete Krachi in the Oti Region of Ghana, resulting in the deaths of 15 people. The small passenger boat, travelling from Okuma to Bovime, capsized around 1:30 p.m. Preliminary investigations by the Ghana Maritime Authority (GMA) indicated that the vessel was grossly overloaded, far exceeding its safe operational capacity.

The fatalities included 11 children (aged 2 to 14), and four adults (three women and one man, aged 18 to 64). Four other adults survived the incident. The bodies of 12 victims were subsequently deposited at the Kete Krachi and Worawora Government Hospital mortuaries. The GMA launched a full investigation and pledged to intensify safety enforcement operations on the lake to prevent future tragedies.

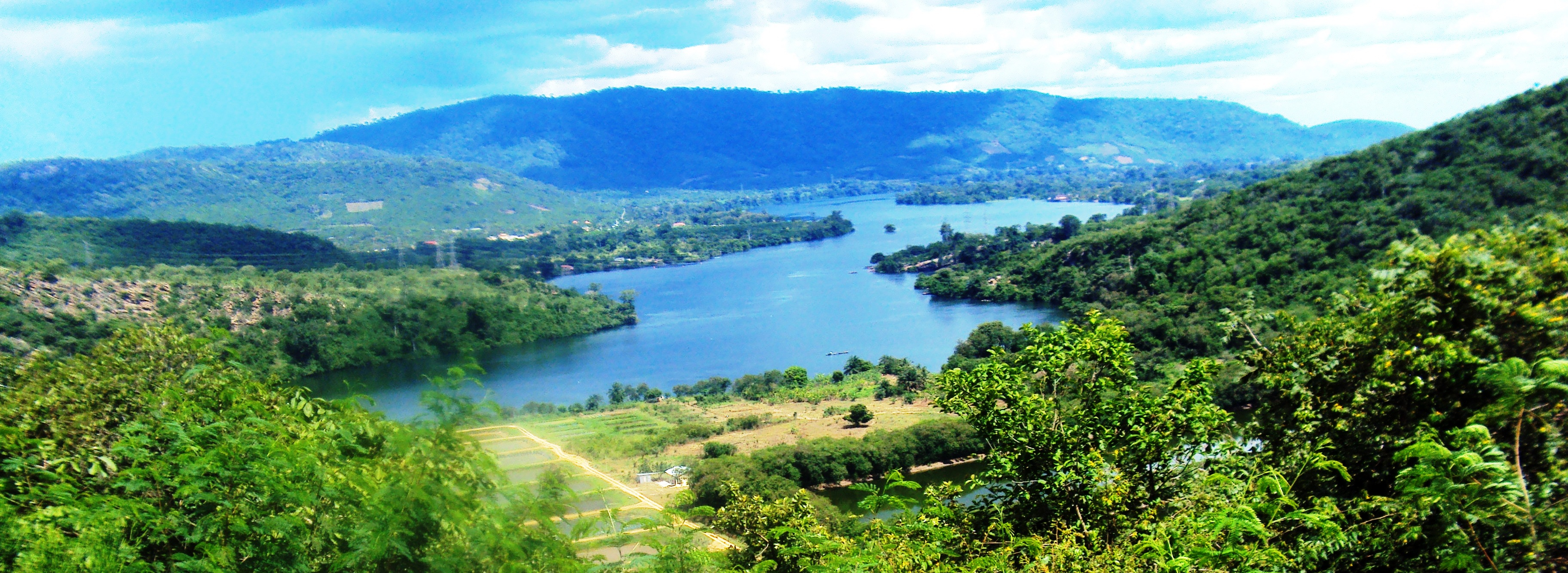
Panorama and landscape of Lake Volta in Ghana: Lake Volta is the largest reservoir by surface area in the world.

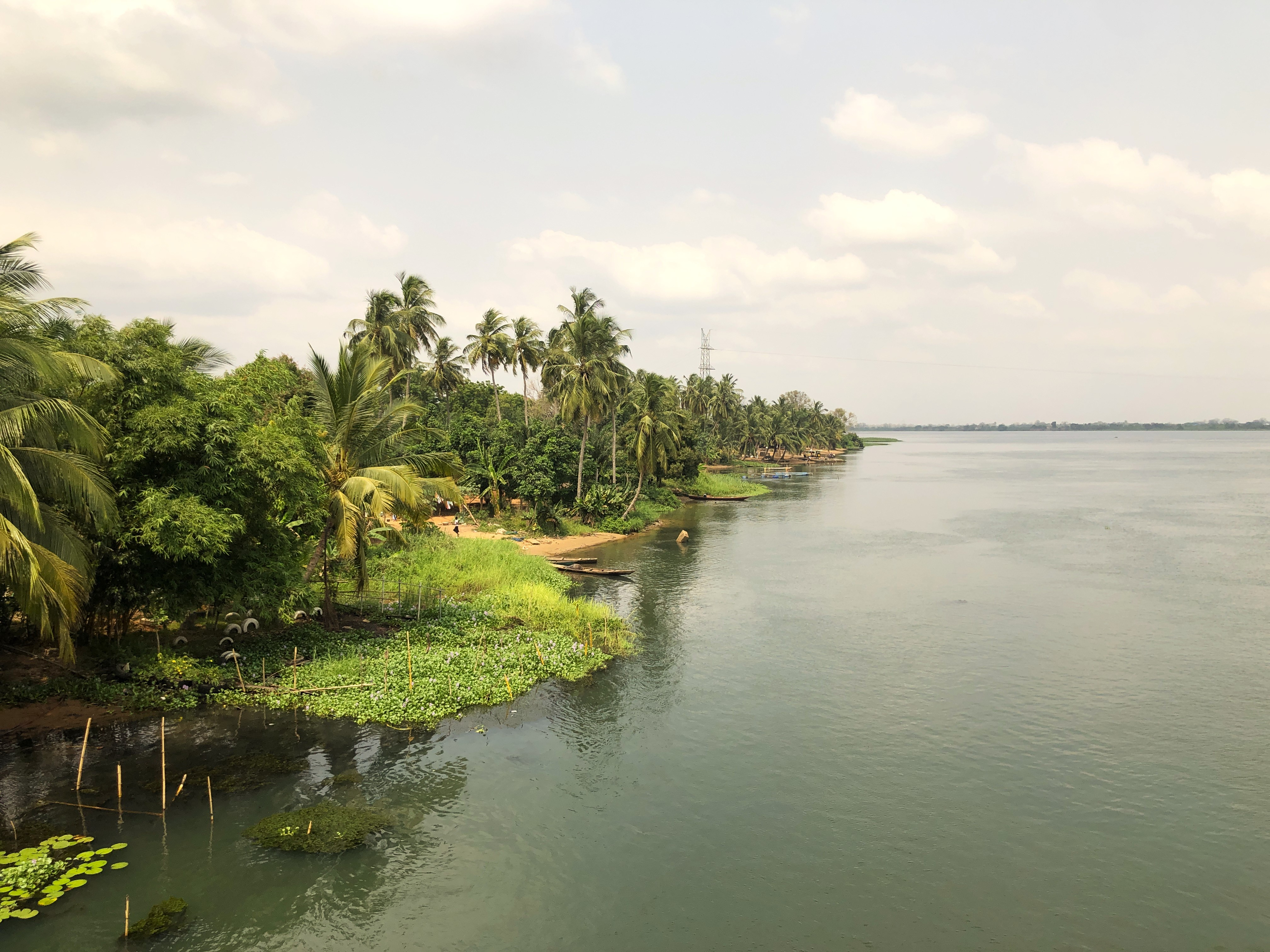
This is a picture of the Volta Lake

== Gallery ==
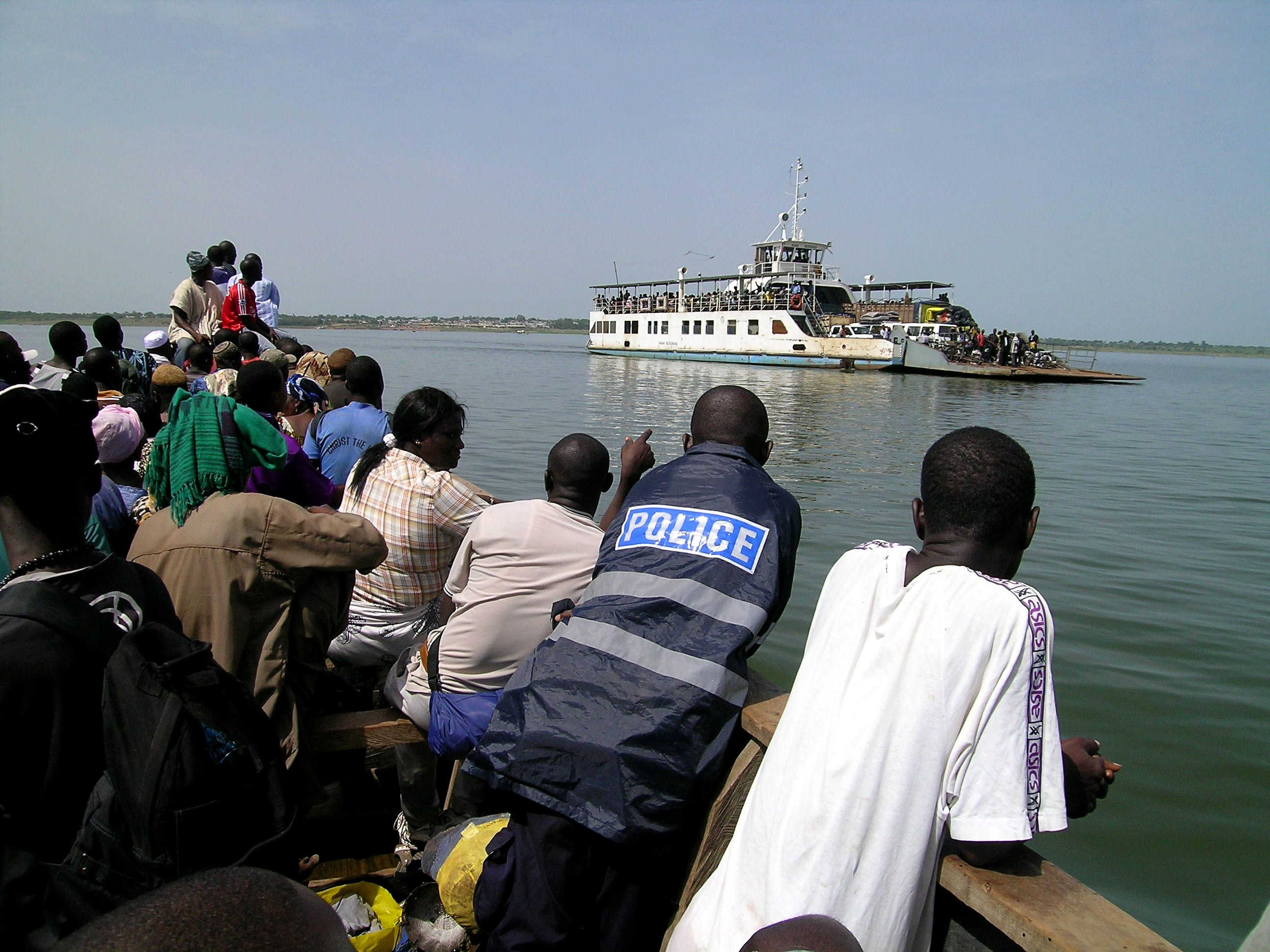
A ferry on Lake Volta

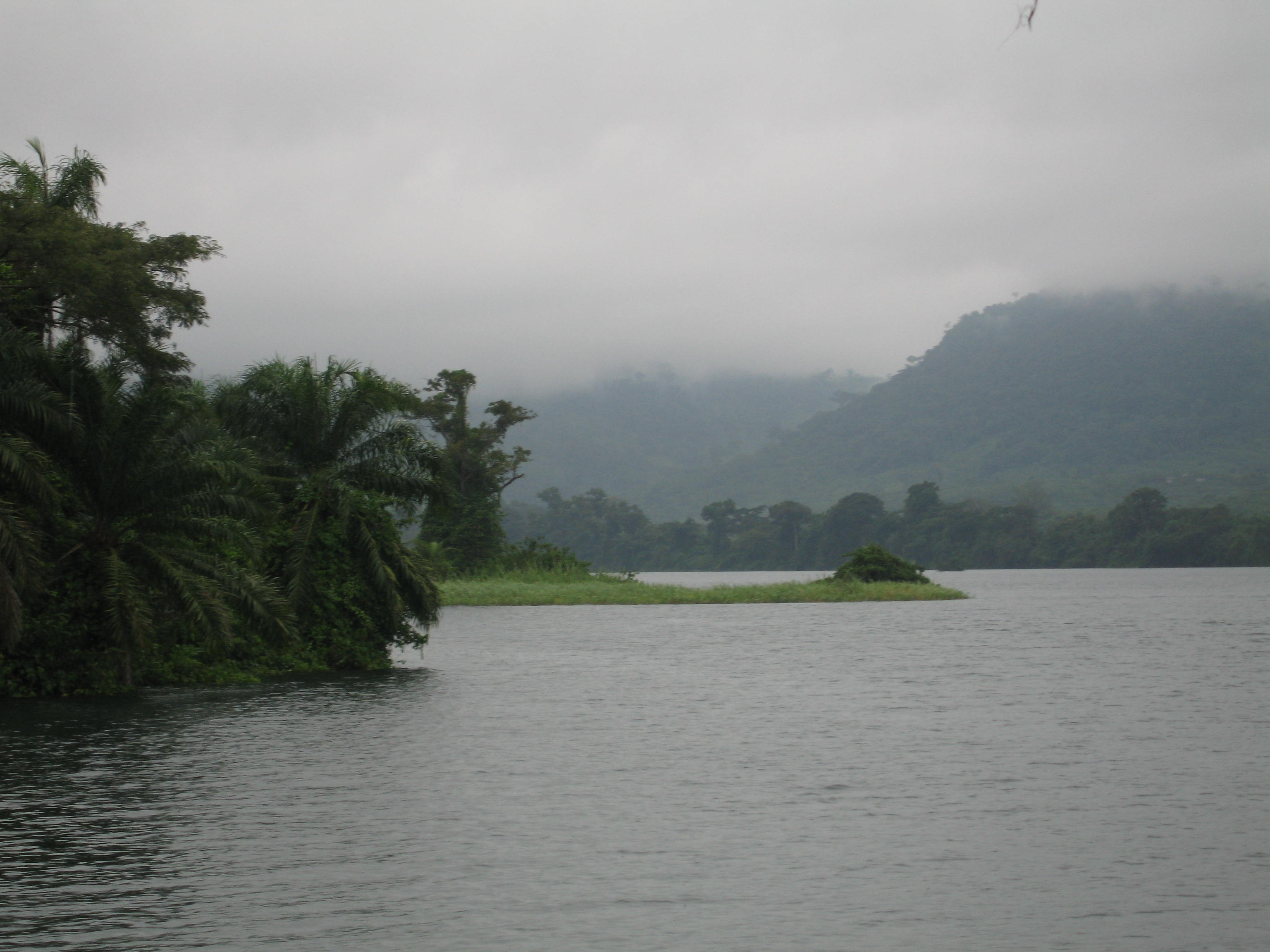
Photograph of Lake Volta

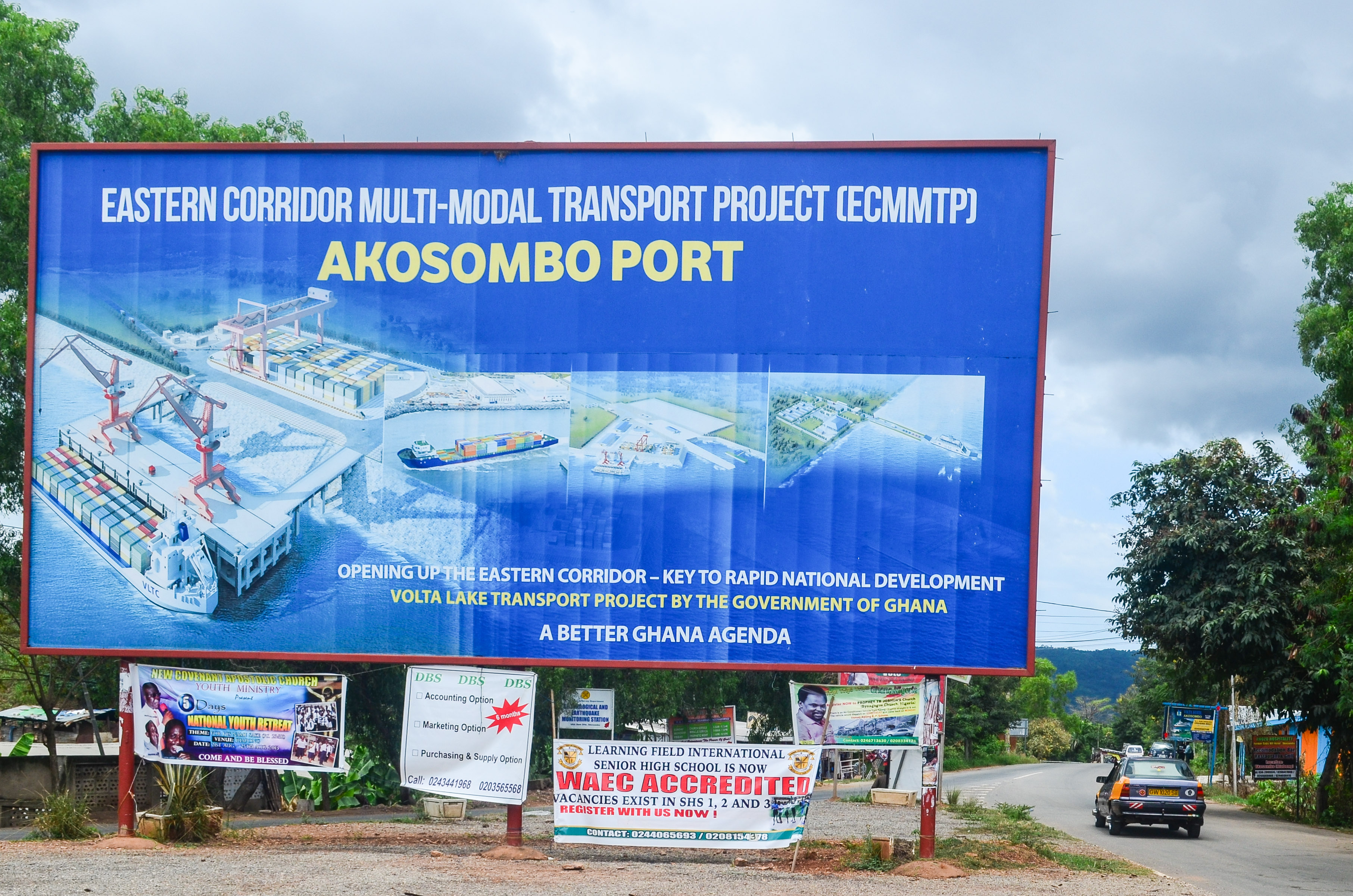
Akosombo Port's signage

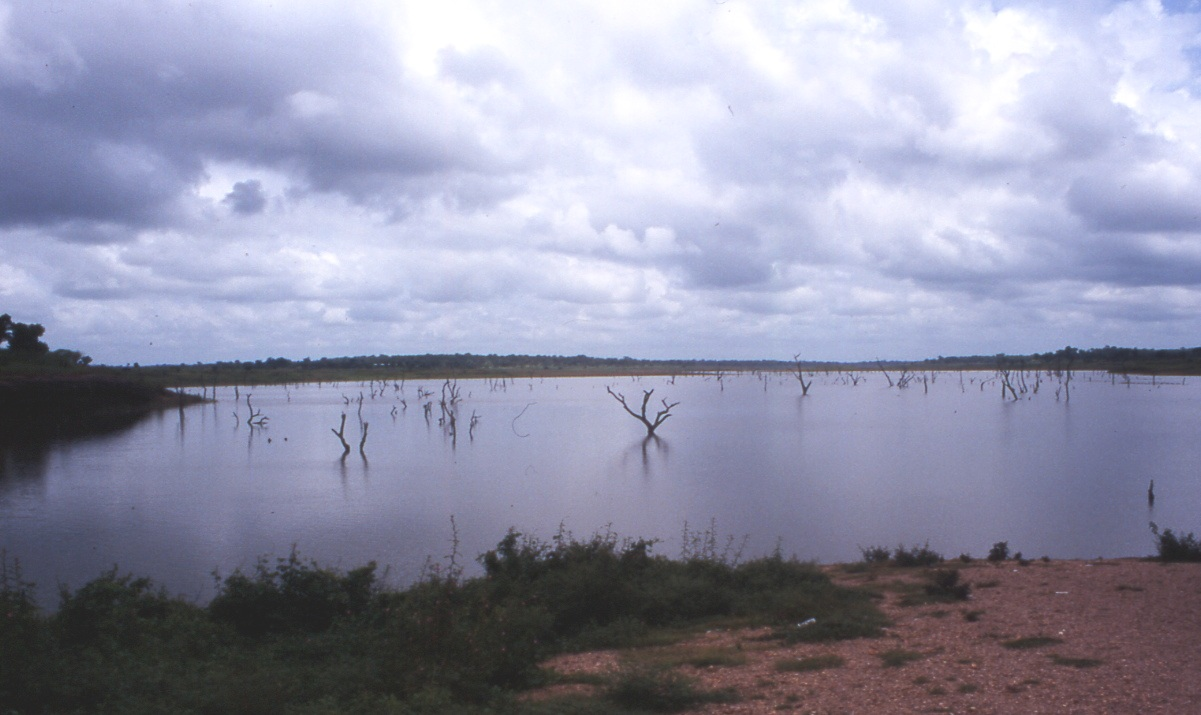
Trees in Lake Volta

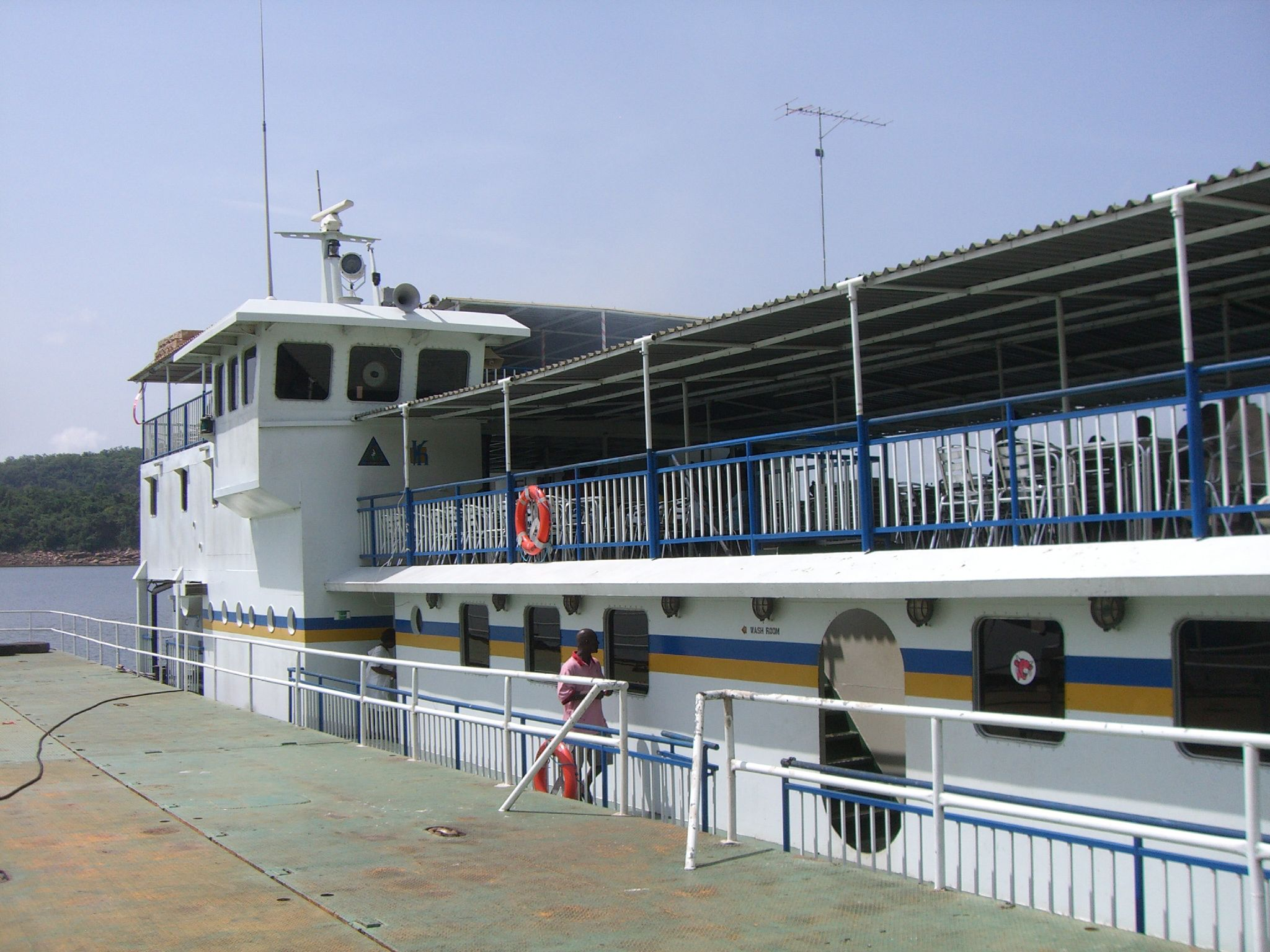
Dock of Dodi Island with Dodi Princess

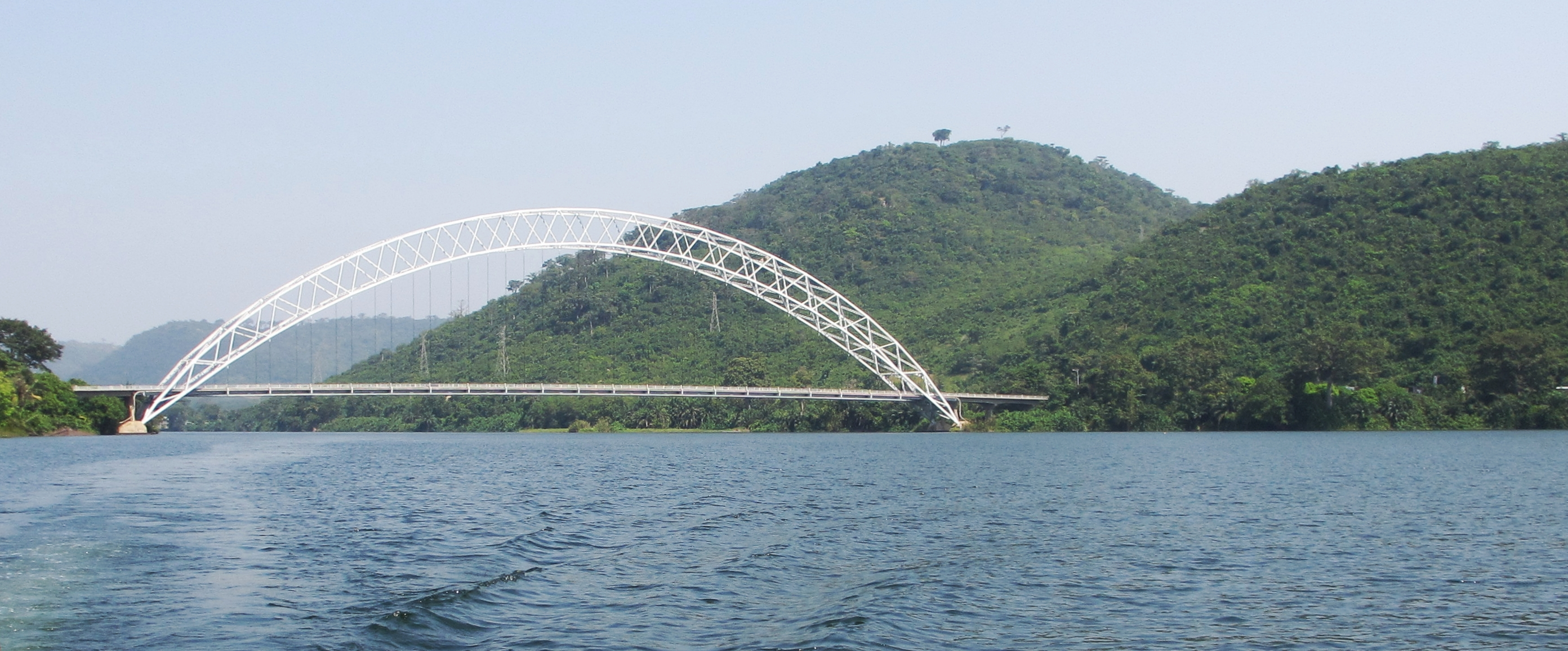
Bridge leaving Volta region heading to Accra

== See also ==
- Lake Kariba, the world's largest reservoir by volume.
