= Dodi Princess =

Former Ghanaian cruise boat

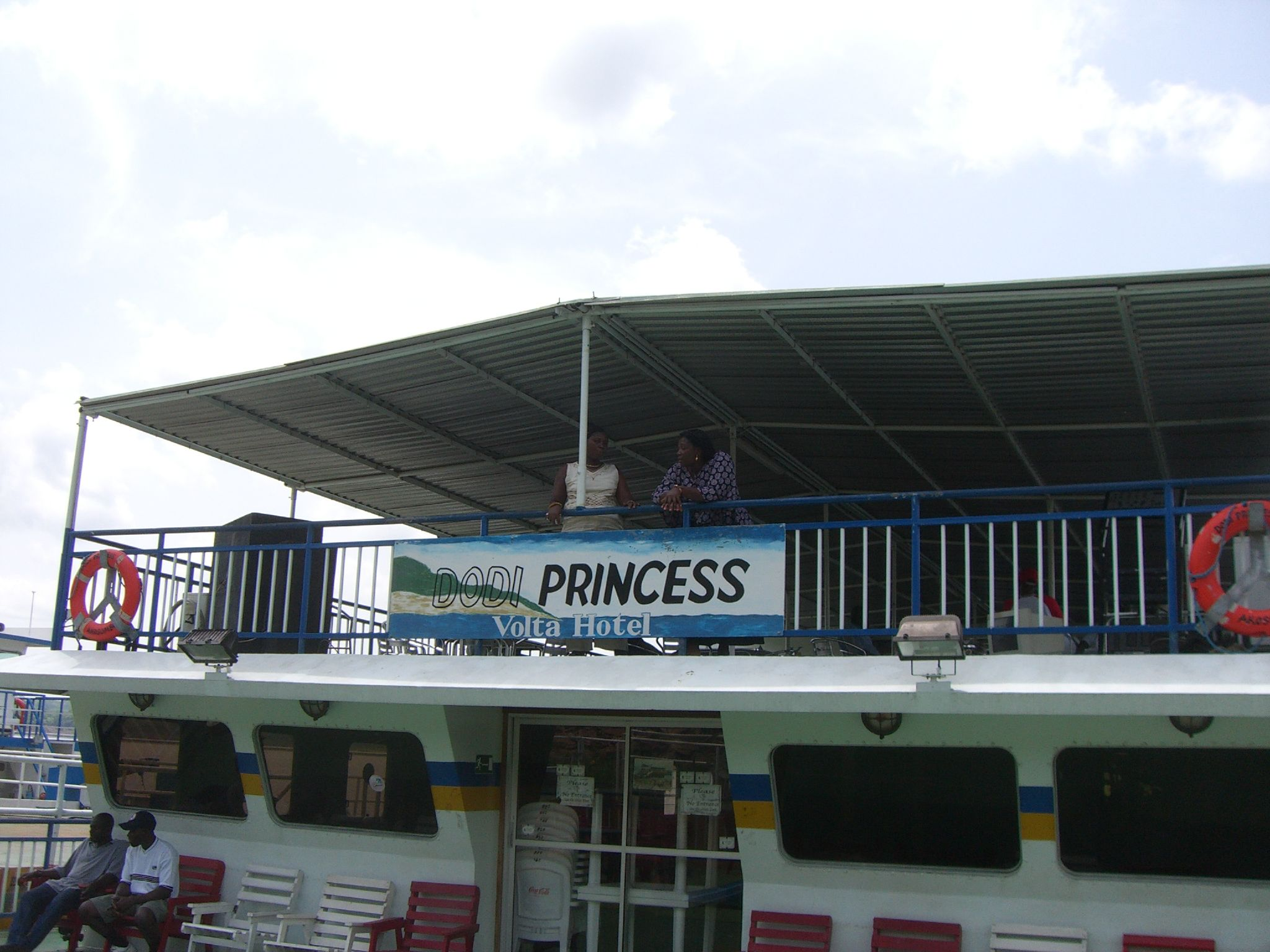
- Dodi Princess on a cruise in Dodi Island on the Lake Volta

History

Ghana
- Name: Dodi Princess
- Owner: Volta River Authority
- Operator: Volta Hotels
- Port of registry: Tema
- Route: Lake Volta
- Builder: Tema Shipyard
- Laid down: 1977
- Maiden voyage: 1977
- In service: 36 years
- Fate: Destroyed in fire, 2013

General characteristics
- Decks: 3 passenger decks
- Speed: 8.6 knots (15.9 km/h; 9.9 mph)
- Capacity: 350

Dodi Princess was a cruise boat on Lake Volta in South Ghana. It was owned by the Volta River Authority and under the management of Volta Hotels. It was the only cruise ship in Ghana. It was built as a cargo ship and later converted into a passenger ship in 1991.

The ship was replaced with the 176-passenger restaurant ship, Dodi Princess II, built in Akosombo, Ghana by Onur Makina of Istanbul, Turkey.

== History ==
The ship was built in 1977 at the Tema Shipyard and christened Grains Maid. The vessel was used mainly for the transportation of dry cargo and agricultural products including fertilizer. A typical voyage upstream would carry goods from Akosombo to Yeji in the Brong-Ahafo Region and Buipe in the northern part of Ghana and its downstream voyage would return with yam and grains to the southern part of the country. Grains Maid sailed on the lake from its commissioning in the late 1970s to the late 1980s when its commercial services declined due to financial constraints. After months of low patronage of its services, the vessel was abandoned at the port of Akosombo.

== Conversion ==
In 1991, the then President of Ghana, Jerry John Rawlings commissioned German engineer, Hans Hein to convert the hull of the vessel to a tour pleasure boat for tourists. Staff of the Maritime Services Unit (MSU) of the Volta River Authority formed a team with Hein to complete the project which was commissioned in 1991, and renamed Dodi Princess. The vessel was the only cruise boat on Lake Volta.

The ship had seating for 400 passengers, who were provided with barbecue meals and live entertainment on board.

== Structure ==
The ship had three decks. The first (lower) deck was an air conditioned, strictly non-smoking cocktail bar, for guests to enjoy a quiet cruise. The two upper decks were open-aired and allowed passengers to enjoy the scenery of the Lake Volta while being treated to live band performances. The middle deck housed a sick bay with the upper deck having a large gridiron for barbecue.

== Maiden cruise ==
Dodi Princess made its first cruise in 1991 during the celebration of the Non-Aligned Movement (NAM) conference which was hosted by Ghana.

== Management ==
The day-to-day management of Dodi Princess upon its commissioning was done by the Marine Division of the Volta River Authority. In 2005, the Division handed over the ship's management to Volta Hotels Limited because the tour business was one of the core objectives of the hotel. Dodi Princess generated 40 percent of the total revenue of Volta Hotels.

== Cruise ==
The ship cruised Lake Volta. A typical cruise took passengers through scenery and landed at Dodi Island, located 5 kilometres (3 nmi; 3 mi) off the shore of Lake Volta.

== Fire outbreak ==
On 4 May 2013, the ship was destroyed by fire. Initial assessment showed that the fire started in the kitchen in the vessel's restaurant. At the time of the fire outbreak, there was nobody on board. Damages were estimated to run into hundreds of thousands of cedis.

== Replacement ==
After the May 2013 destruction, Volta Hotels Limited contracted Bluefone Marine Company, a Ghanaian-based marine construction company, to reconstruct the vessel at a cost of 1.3 million dollars. Bluefone Marine proposed that the vessel would be seaworthy in six months.

The VRA's 2013 Annual Report stated that its subsidiary Akosombo Hotels Ltd was seeking to raise financing of over $10,000,000 to complete construction of 65–100 rooms and re-construction of the Dodi Princess. However, the 2014 report stated that financing of over $20,000,000 was needed to complete construction of 65 rooms and a new cruise boat, Dodi Princess. The 2015 report stated that VRA had spent approximately $1.5 million on construction of a new 176-seater cruise boat, Dodi Princess II.

In the end, the burnt Dodi Princess was replaced with Dodi Princess II. Akosombo Hotels Ltd contracted Onur Makina of Istanbul, Turkey to build and deliver the 176-passenger restaurant ship in Akosombo, Ghana. Upon the completion of its construction, Dodi Princess II resumed service on the Volta Lake in July 2019.
