= Worlase Kpeli =

Ghanaian politician and lawyer

Hon. Worlase Kpeli

Member of Parliament for Afram Plains North (Ghana parliament constituency)
- Incumbent
- Assumed office 07 January 2025 - Present
- Preceded by: Betty Krosbi Mensah

Personal details
- Born: August 26, 1980 (age 46) Battor, Ghana
- Party: Independent
- Education: Evangelical Presbyterian College of Education, Amedzofe; University of London; University of Ghana; Ghana Institute of Management and Public Administration; Chartered Institute of Arbitrators; Ghana School of Law
- Occupation: Politician, Lawyer

Worlase Kpeli (born 26 August 1980) is a Ghanaian politician and lawyer. He is currently the member of parliament for the Afram Plains North (Ghana parliament constituency) in the 9th parliament of the fourth republic. He previously contested the former member of parliament, Betty Krosbi Mensah for the parliamentary candidacy of the National Democratic Congress and lost twice.

== Early life and education ==
lawyer Kpeli hails from Battor in the Volta Region of Ghana. He obtained a post secondary certificate from the Evangelical Presbyterian College of Education, Amedzofe in 2003. He later earned a Diploma in archives administration and Bachelor of Arts degree from the University of Ghana in 2007 and 2014 respectively. He got a Bachelor of Laws from the University of London in 2015 and later a Certificate in Ghana legal Systems and Constitutional Law from the Ghana School of Law in 2016. In 2019, he obtained a Post Graduate Diploma in Legal Practices from the Institute of Legal Practice and Development in Rwanda and subsequently a Master of Arts in International Relations and Diplomacy from the Ghana Institute of Management and Public Administration in 2024.

== Politics ==
Worlase Kpeli was a Member of the National Democratic Congress until his suspension from the party for campaigning against it in July 2024.

Kpeli contested the National Democratic Congress (Ghana) primaries in 2019 and 2023 and lost both to former member of parliament before filing to contest in the 2024 Ghanaian general election as an independent candidate.

=== Member of Parliament ===
==== 2024 elections ====
Worlase Kpeli contested and won the 2024 Ghanaian general election as an independent parliamentary candidate in the Afram Plains North (Ghana parliament constituency) in the Eastern Region (Ghana).

He won by polling 11,452 votes representing 46.73%, while his closest contender, Betty Krosbi Mensah of the National Democratic Congress (Ghana) polled 10,993 representing 46.73%. The New Patriotic Party's candidate, Asaimah K. Anim polled 1,992 representing 8.13%.
