= CNN Freedom Project =

CNN project to expose modern-day slavery and human trafficking

The CNN Freedom Project is a year-long humanitarian news media campaign launched by CNN and CNN International in 2011 to "end modern-day slavery" and related illegal practices, including human trafficking.

It was started on the initiative of CNN International's vice president Tony Maddox, who was honored for this in 2015 by the U.S. Department of State as a Trafficking in Persons Report Hero.

In March 2019 its reporting on child labor in fishing communities of Lake Volta in Ghana was criticized by the Ghanaian politician Betty Mensah and the academic Samuel Okyere, who said CNN ignored that many children become self-sufficient fishermen in adulthood and can thus be described as apprentices rather than slaves.
