= Cedikope =

Community in Eastern Region, Ghana

- Country: Ghana
- Region: Eastern Region
- District: Kwahu Afram Plains North District

Cedikope is rural community in the Kwahu Afram Plains North District in the Eastern Region in Ghana.

== Institutions ==
- Cedikope Community Health Planning and Services (CHPS)
