= Joseph Tsatsu Agbenu =

Ghanaian politician

Hon. Joseph Tsatsu Agbenu

Member of Ghana Parliament for Afram Plains North constituency
- In office January 7, 2001 – January 6, 2009
- Preceded by: Krosby Mensah
- Succeeded by: Emmanuel Aboagye Didieye

Personal details
- Born: November 20, 1936 (age 89) Afram Plains, Eastern Region Gold Coast (now Ghana)
- Party: National Democratic Congress
- Occupation: Politician
- Profession: Lawyer

Joseph Tsatsu Agbenu (born November 20, 1936) is a Ghanaian politician and a member of the Fourth Parliament of the Fourth Republic representing the Afram Plains North Constituency in the Eastern Region of Ghana.

== Early life and education ==
Agbenu was born on November 20, 1936, in the Eastern Region, in a town called Afram Plains.

== Career ==
Agbenu is a lawyer and a former member of Parliament to the Afram Plain North Constituency from 2005 to 2009 in the Eastern Region of Ghana.

== Politics ==
Agbenu was first elected into Parliament on the ticket of the National Democratic Congress during the December 2000 Ghanaian General Elections as a member of Parliament for the Afram Plain North Constituency. He was chosen over Joseph Buer Plahar.of the New Patriotic Party (NPP), Albert Quarcoo-Zah of the Convention People's Party (CPP), Amidu Tanko of the People's National Convention (PNC) and Azilaku Emmanuel Yaw of the National Reform Party (NRP). He won a total votes of 17,073 which was equivalent to 80.30%. His opponents had 2,240, 1,134, 475and 349 respectively. These votes represent 10.50%, 5.30%, 2.20% and 1.60% of the total votes cast. He was then reelected in 2005 after emerging winner of the 2004 Ghanaian General Elections. He polled 18,905 votes out of the 24,556 valid votes cast representing 77.00%. He served only one term as a Parliamentarian.

== Personal life ==
Agbenu is a Christian.
