= Donkorkrom Hospital =

Public hospital in Kwahu Afram Plains

Geography
- Location: Kwahu Afram Plains North District in the Eastern Region, Ghana

Links
- Lists: Hospitals in Ghana

Donkorkrom Presbyterian Hospital is a public hospital located in the Kwahu Afram Plains North District in the Eastern Region.

Capacity is listed as 74 beds.

== See also ==
- List of hospitals in Ghana
