= Wayne Dunn =

Canadian academic and consultant

- Born: Canada
- Education: Stanford Graduate School of Business (MSc in Management, Sloan Fellow)
- Occupations: Academic, consultant, social entrepreneur
- Employer(s): CSR Training Institute; Formerly: McGill University
- Known for: CSR Training Institute (Founder)
- Website: www.csrtraininginstitute.com

Wayne Dunn is a Canadian academic and consultant whose work focuses on corporate social responsibility (CSR), environmental, social, and governance (ESG) strategy, and sustainable development. He is the founder of the CSR Training Institute and the CSR ESG Institute, and formerly served as Professor of Practice at McGill University.

== Education and academic career ==
Dunn holds a Master of Science in Management from the Stanford Graduate School of Business, where he was a Sloan Fellow. He later joined McGill University as a Professor of Practice and served on the Leadership Council at McGill’s Institute for the Study of International Development.

He has contributed to academic programs in North America, Europe, Africa, and Asia. He collaborated with the University for Development Studies in Ghana to develop CSR-focused academic programs. In 2012, he facilitated a Memorandum of Understanding (MoU) between the University of Winnipeg and UDS to promote joint research on Indigenous knowledge and environmental stewardship. In 2013, Dunn accompanied students from the University of Winnipeg’s Master’s in Development Practice program on a visit to Ghana to engage with international organizations on sustainability issues.

In 2015, Dunn published an article in ReConnect Africa discussing the role of shared responsibility among stakeholders in CSR initiatives. In 2024, he led the development and delivery of the ESG & Sustainable Finance Program at the CSR ESG Institute, which is accredited by the International Association for Quality Assurance in Pre-Tertiary and Higher Education (QAHE).

== Career ==
Dunn began working in corporate social responsibility in the late 1980s, initially focusing on Indigenous engagement in Canada’s resource sector. He later founded Wayne Dunn & Associates, the CSR Training Institute and CSR ESG Institute, working on projects in sectors including mining, energy, and forestry.

He has served as an advisor to organizations such as the World Bank, United Nations, African Union, and Inter-American Development Bank, and to Ghanaian government institutions including the Ghana National Petroleum Corporation, Ghana Minerals Commission, and Ministry of Lands and Natural Resources. He contributed to the development of Ghana’s CSR policy and was a member of Canada’s Aboriginal Expert Group on the Extractive Sector Transparency Measures Act.

Dunn is a founding member of the EU–Africa Chamber of Commerce Advisory Board and the SDG Foundation. In 2014, he was appointed Chair of the Jury for the CSR in Africa Award by the EU–Africa Chamber of Commerce. He has also served as a facilitator at professional development events such as the 2022 Corporate Social Responsibility Network Zimbabwe Autumn School.

== Selected projects ==
Dunn led the Placer Dome CARE Project in South Africa, a support initiative for laid-off workers, which was profiled by the Stanford Graduate School of Business and received a World Bank Development Innovation Award.

In 2005, he co-founded Clark Sustainable Resource Developments (CSRD) alongside the Rt. Hon. Joe Clark, former Prime Minister and Foreign Minister of Canada, a venture with the Government of Ghana to harvest submerged hardwood trees from Lake Volta. The project aimed to provide sustainable timber while improving safety and generating employment. It was supported by investors including Goldman Sachs, Barclays and others, and involved collaboration with Triton Logging.

Dunn co-founded Baraka Shea Butter in 2013, a Canadian-Ghanaian company that sources handmade shea butter from women’s cooperatives in northern Ghana. Baraka opened the Konjeihi Women’s Enterprise Centre in Ghana’s Upper West Region to support women’s employment and shea butter processing.

He has also led CSR training and strategy programs in Africa. In 2013, Dunn delivered a public lecture on CSR in Accra organized by the CSR Foundation and the UN Global Compact Network. In 2014, he led the McGill Executive Programme on CSR Strategy and Management in Ghana, where case studies were presented by corporate participants such as Guinness Ghana Breweries.

== Publications and presentations ==
Dunn has published articles on CSR and sustainability in outlets including Stanford Social Innovation Review and TriplePundit. He has developed educational content and online courses on CSR and ESG.

He has spoken at international conferences and academic institutions including the United Nations, the World Bank, Stanford University, and McGill University. Appearances include the 2022 CSR Network Zimbabwe Autumn School, the 2023 Responsible Business and Leadership Excellence Summit in Accra, and the 2024 International Christian Social Responsibility Conference in Lagos.

In 2024, Dunn spoke at the inaugural FITC Sustainability & ESG Institute Summit in Lagos, Nigeria. He has also been associated with the Responsible Business and Leadership Excellence Awards (RBLEA), serving as a jury member and co-organizer of related summits on sustainable leadership.

== Recognition ==
Dunn received the World Bank Development Innovation Award, the Nexen Award for Excellence in Corporate Social and Ethical Responsibility, and the People’s Choice Award at the World Bank Development Marketplace.

In 2024, he was recognized by the Stellar Performance CEO Awards for his work in CSR and sustainable business. Dunn was also enskinned as development chief of the Konjeihi community in northern Ghana, receiving the honorary title Tengmaale Naa in recognition of his support for women’s economic initiatives.
