= Emmanuel Aboagye Didieye =

Ghanaian politician (1976–2017)

MP
- In office 2009–2017
- Preceded by: Joseph Tsatsu Agbenu
- Succeeded by: Betty Nana Effua Krosby Mensah
- Constituency: Afram Plains North

Personal details
- Born: 23 November 1976
- Died: 14 October 2017 (aged 40) Accra
- Party: National Democratic Congress

Emmanuel Aboagye Didieye (23 November 1976 – 14 October 2017) was a medical doctor and a politician of the Republic of Ghana. He was a member of the 5th and 6th parliament of the 4th Republic of Ghana representing Bomasarefo Constituency in the Eastern Region of Ghana.

== Early life and education ==
He was born on 23 November 1976, and lived in Bomasarefo. He earned a degree from the Indian for-profit educational institution National Institute of Information Technology in 2004. He also had a Master in Public Administration Degree at Ghana Institute of Management and Public Administration in 2011.

== Political career ==
He was a member of the National Democratic Congress. Didieye was first elected into the parliament in the 2008 Ghanaian General Election, as a representative of Afram Plains North. He won reelection in 2012, but lost a party primary in 2015 and was succeeded in office by Betty Nana Effua Krosby Mensah.

== Personal life ==
He was married with one child and was a Christian who worshipped in The True Faith Church.

== Death ==
He fell into a coma in October 2017, and was moved to Trust Hospital in Accra, where he died on 14 October 2017, aged 41.
