= Tony Maddox =

British journalist

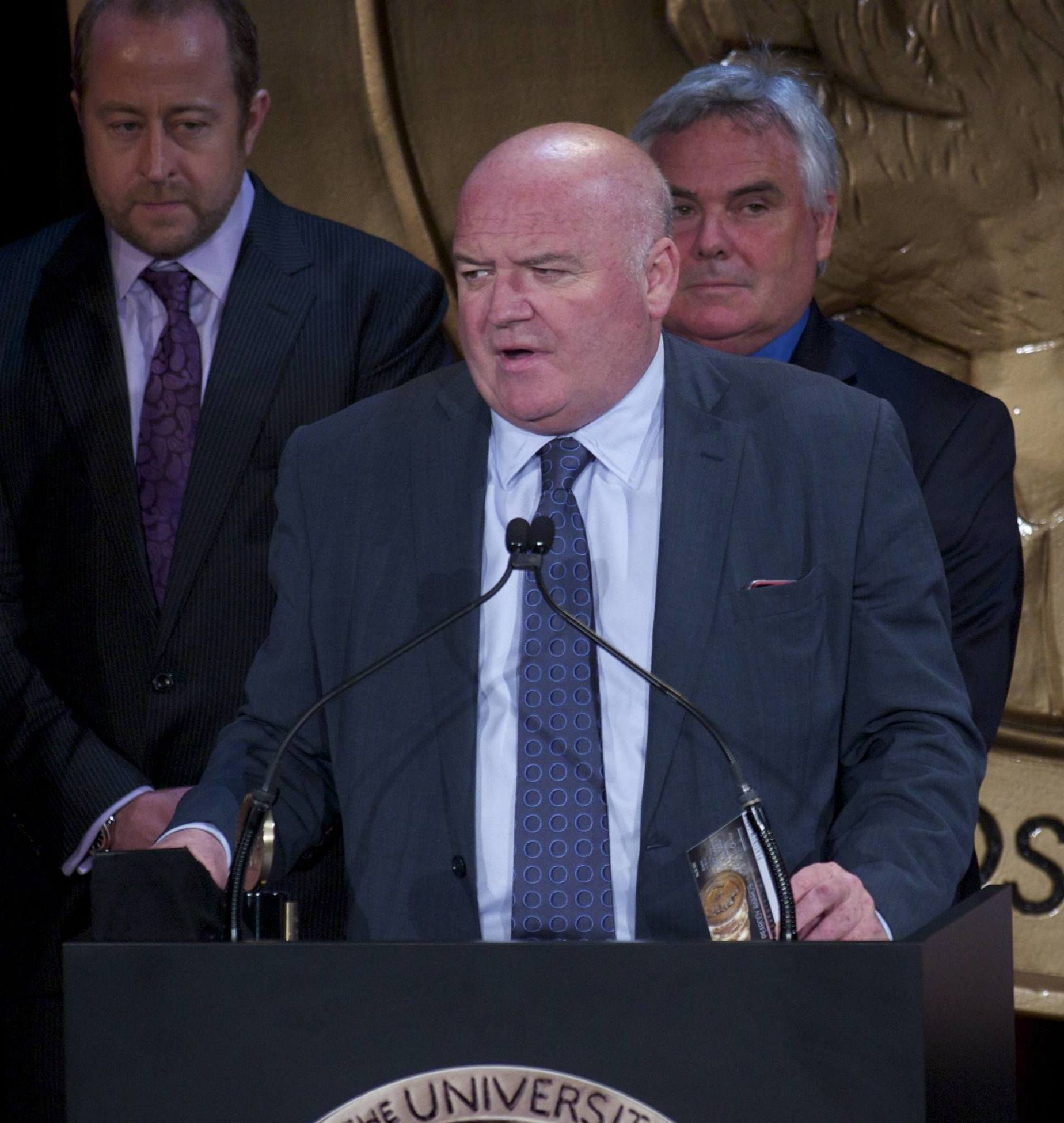
Tony Maddox, 2013

Tony Maddox is a British journalist. He was executive vice president and managing director of CNN International from 2003 until May 2019.

He previously worked at the BBC for 13 years as a reporter, news producer and news editor.

In 2015 he was honored by the U.S. State Department as a Trafficking in Persons Report Hero for starting the CNN Freedom Project.

He left CNN in May 2019 for retirement after 21 years with the company by accepting a voluntary buyout option.
