= Afram Plains District =

Kwahu North (Afram Plains) District
- Former District
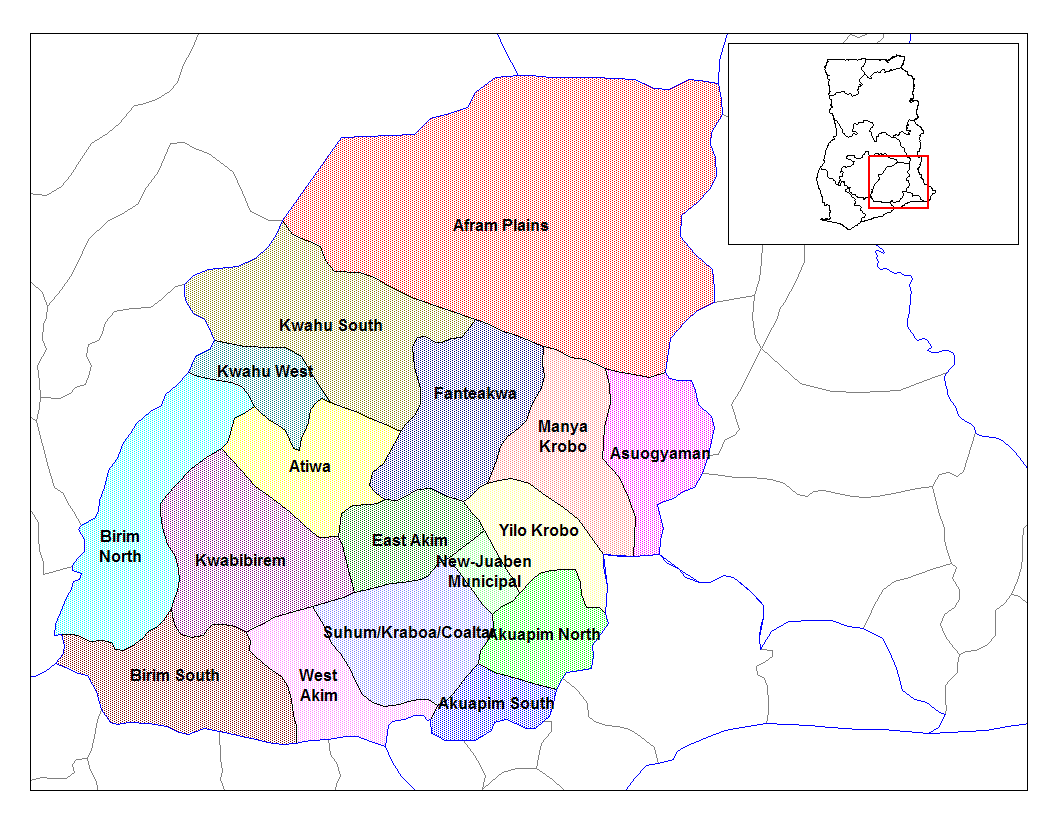
- Districts of Eastern Region

- Location of Kwahu North (Afram Plains) District within Eastern
- Coordinates: 7°03′07″N 0°04′48″W
- Country: Ghana
- Region: Eastern
- Capital: Donkorkrom

Government
  - District Executive: Samuel Kena

Area
  - Total: 3,559 km^{2} (1,374 sq mi)

Population (2013)
  - Total: —
- Time zone: UTC+0 (GMT)
- ISO 3166 code: GH-EP-AP

Afram Plains District is a former district that was located in Eastern Region, Ghana. Originally created as an ordinary district assembly in 1988 when it was known as Kwahu North District, which was created from the former Kwahu District Council, until it was later renamed to become Afram Plains District in 1993. However, on 19 June 2012, it was split off into two new districts: Kwahu Afram Plains North District (capital: Donkorkrom) and Kwahu Afram Plains South District (capital: Tease). The district assembly was located in the northern part of Eastern Region and had Donkorkrom as its capital town.

== Administration ==
In Kwahu Afram Plains North District, they currently have Betty Mensah, who succeeded Emmanuel Aboagye Didie as the member of Parliament. Samuel Kena a retired educationist is the current district chief executive.

== Recreation ==
Area well noted for fresh water fishing and production of smoked fish. Most major markets in Ghana receive their smoked fish from this area. However, the area is expected to be among of the districts to record highest production levels of cassava, with production estimated at, 562,586 MT.

Traditionally, owned by the Kwahu but occupied much by the Ewes and Krobos due to the fishing.

== Sources ==
- "Kwahu North District". Statoids.
- District: Kwahu North District
