= Dodi Island =

Island in Lake Volta, Ghana

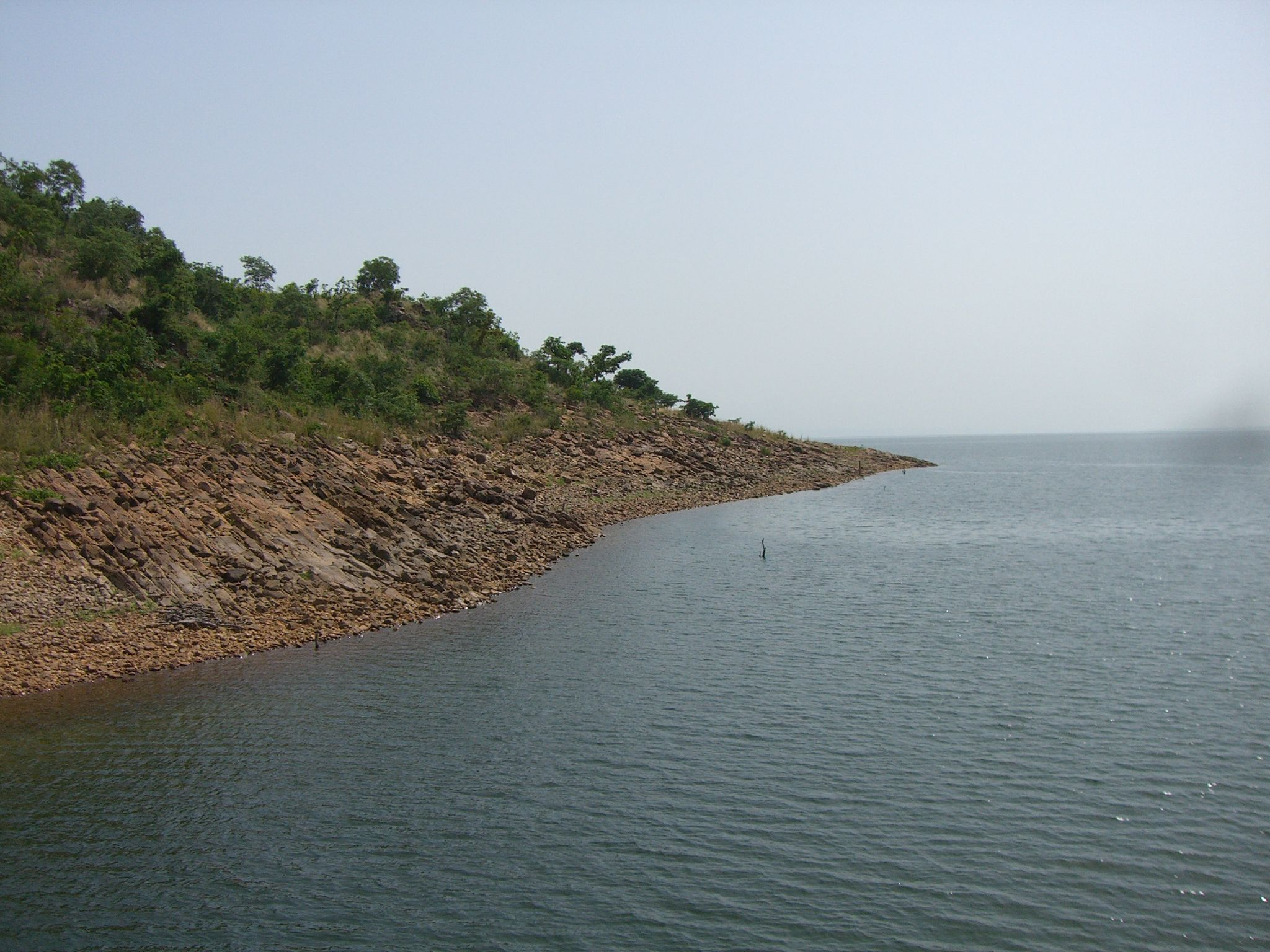
- Dodi Island Rocky Shores
- Interactive map of Dodi Island

Geography
- Location: South Ghana
- Coordinates: 6.55969°N 0.11231°E
- Adjacent to: Lake Volta
- Area: 0.625 km^{2} (0.241 sq mi)

Administration
- Ghana
- Region: Eastern Region

Demographics
- Population: 600 (2012)

Dodi Island is an island in Ghana, located 5 kilometres (3 nmi; 3 mi) off the shore of Lake Volta. It is a tourist destination and was a landing place for the Ghanaian former cruise ship Dodi Princess, which was used for cruises on Lake Volta, from 1991 until the vessel's destruction in a fire in 2013.

Dodi Island became a major tourist site in Ghana following its creation in 1961, following the formation of Lake Volta. In 2011, the Volta River Authority allocated US$2.5 million to develop Dodi Island’s eco-tourism potential through its hospitality subsidiary, Volta Hotels Limited.

== Gallery ==
Tourism in Dodi Island

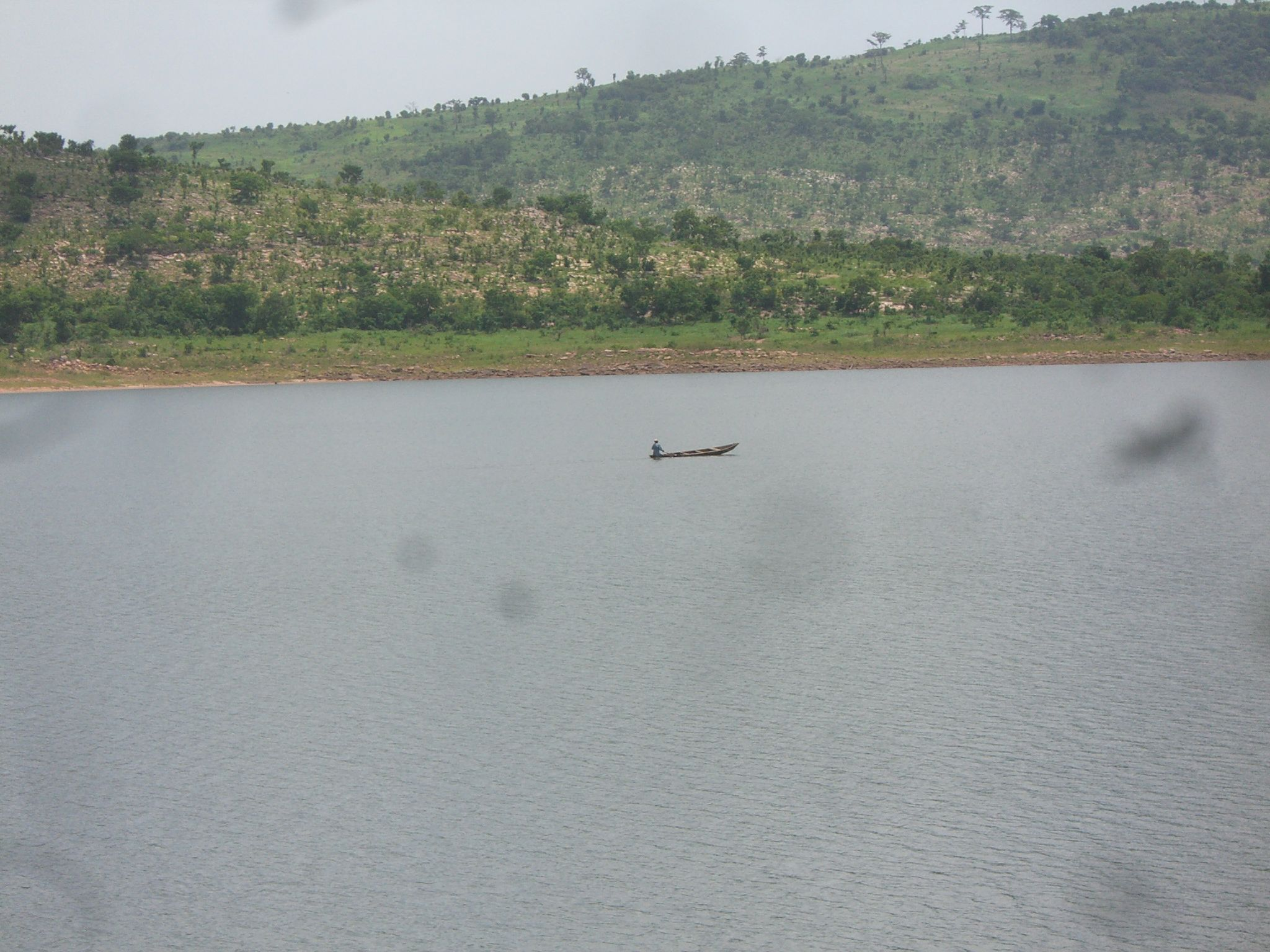
Rocky shores of Dodi Island.

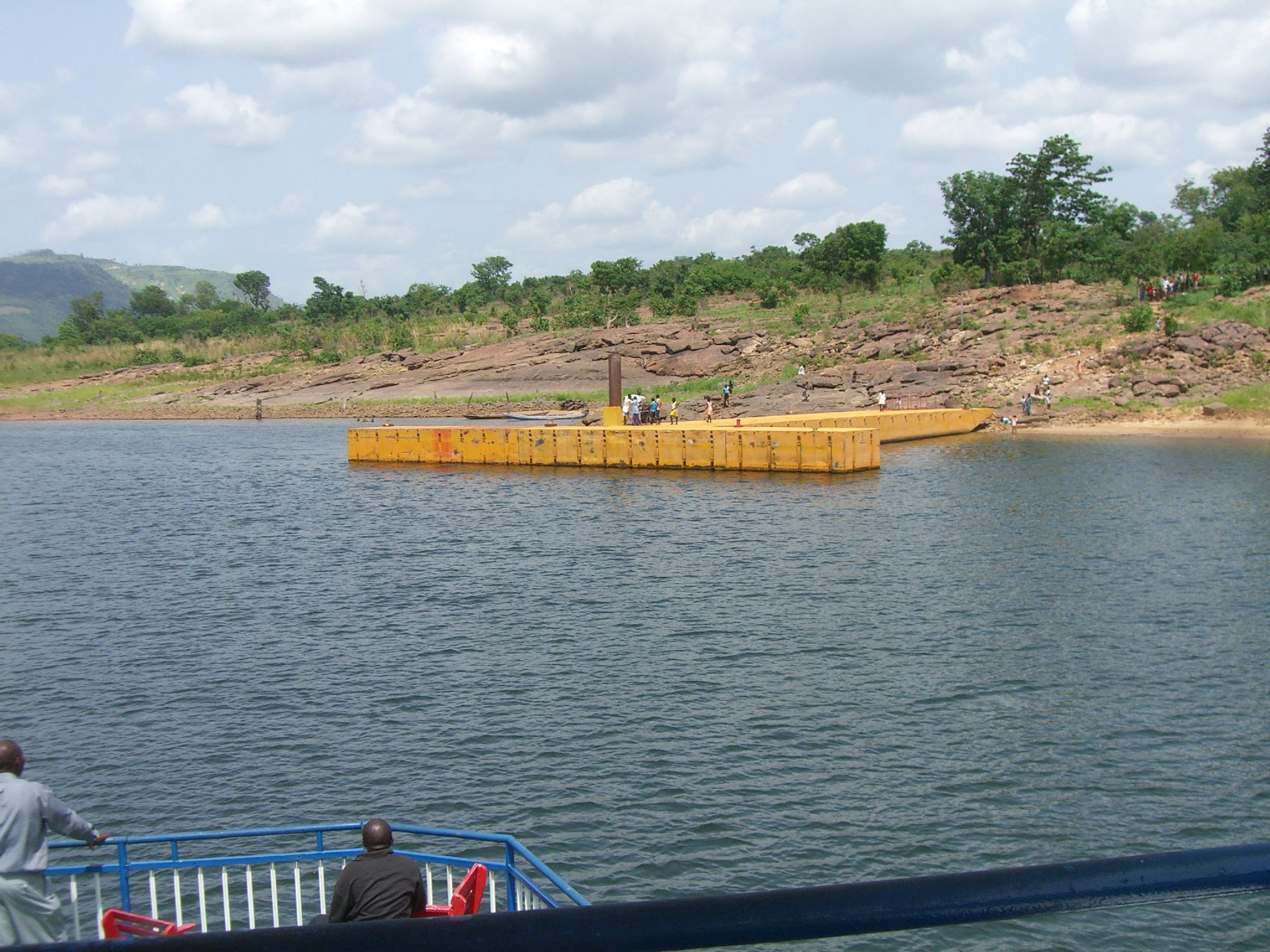
Pier and shoreline of Dodi Island.

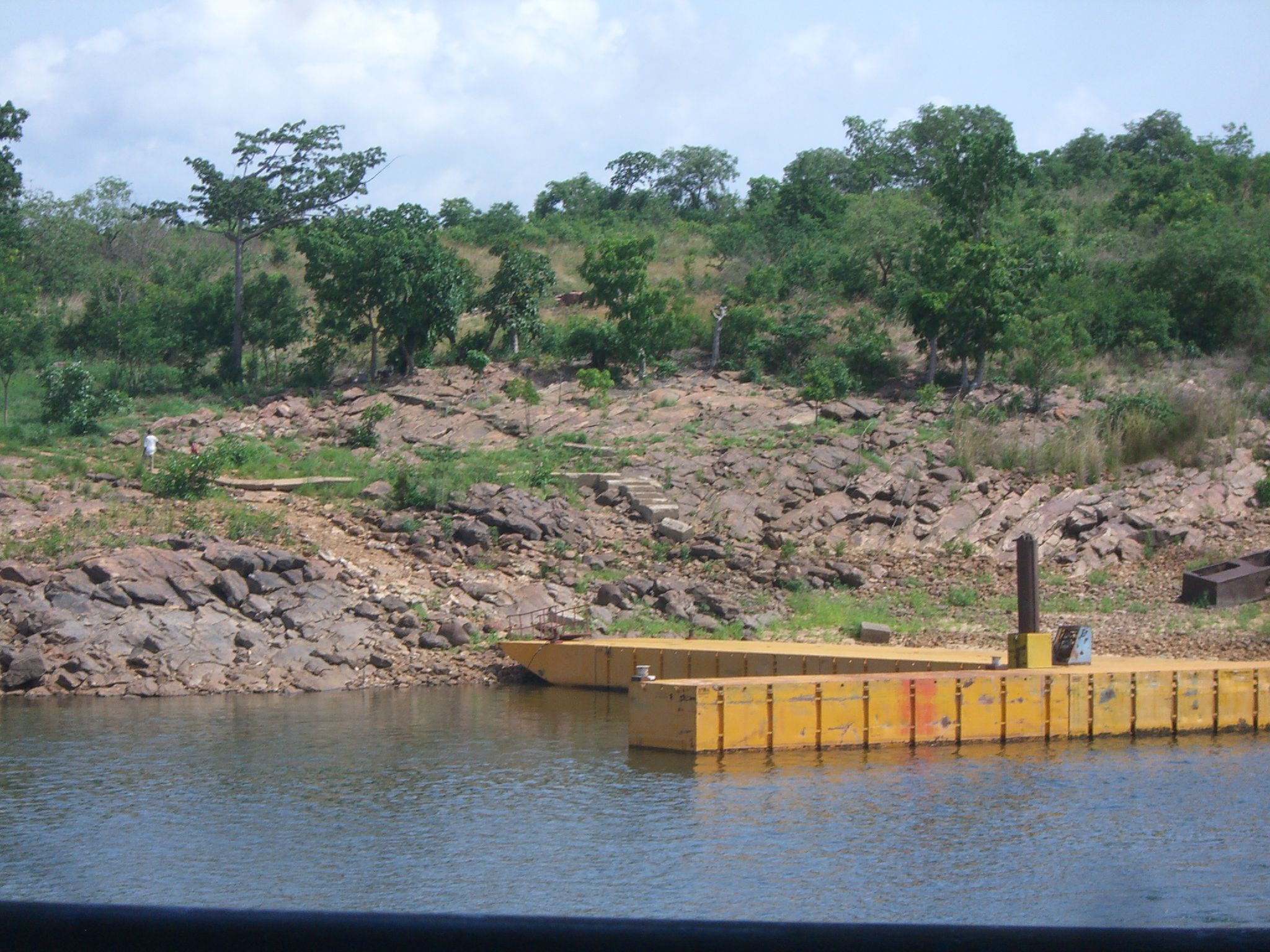
Cruiseliner pier of Dodi Island.

== See also ==
- Dodi Princess
