= Kwahu Afram Plains South (district) =

Kwahu-Afram Plains South District
- District
- Seal

- Districts of Eastern Region

- Location of Kwahu-Afram Plains South District within Eastern
- Coordinates: 6°55′44.04″N 0°15′18″W
- Country: Ghana
- Region: Eastern
- Capital: Tease

Population (2021)
  - Total: 74,002
- Time zone: UTC+0 (GMT)

Kwahu Afram Plains South District is one of the thirty-three districts in Eastern Region, Ghana. Originally it was formerly part of the then-larger Kwahu North District in 1988 (later known as Afram Plains District), until the western part of the district was split off to create Kwahu Afram Plains South District on 19 June 2012; thus the remaining part has been renamed as Kwahu Afram Plains North District. The district assembly is located in the northern part of Eastern Region and has Tease as its capital town.
