= Tease, Ghana =

Town in Eastern Region, Ghana

Tease
- Town
- Location of Tease in Eastern Region, Ghana Tease (Africa)
- Coordinates: 6.93°N 0.25°W
- Country: Ghana
- Region: Eastern Region
- Metropolitan: Kwahu Afram Plains South District
- Time zone: GMT
  - Summer (DST): GMT

Tease is a town and district capital of the Kwahu Afram Plains South District in the Eastern Region of Ghana.

== Institutions ==
- Tease D/A Junior High School
- Tease R/C Junior High School
- Tease Presbyterian Clinic
- Tease Presbyterian Hospital
