= Tema Shipyard =

Sea vessel construction company in Ghana

Tema Shipyard is a sea vessel construction company located in the port city of Tema in Ghana.
