= Evangelical Presbyterian College of Education, Amedzofe =

- Collège évangélique presbytérien d'éducation, Amedzofe; Nyanyuigblɔlawo ƒe Presbyteriatɔwo ƒe Sukudede Kɔledzi, Amedzofe
- Other names: E. P. College of Education, Amedzofe
- Affiliations: Government of Ghana
- Location: Amedzofe, Ho West District, V10523, Ghana; 6.84324°N 0.43728°E
- Language: Ewe, French and English
- Region Zone: Volta Region; Volta Zone
- Short name: Ameco
- Source: An Atlas of The Forty Colleges of Education in Ghana.

Evangelical Presbyterian College of Education, Amedzofe is a teacher education college in Amedzofe (Ho West District, Volta Region, Ghana). The college is located in Volta Zone. It is one of 46 public colleges of education in Ghana. The college participated in the DFID-funded T-TEL programme.

As of May 2019, the college is affiliated with the University of Ghana.

== History ==
Evangelical Presbyterian College of Education (AMECO) was opened on February 10, 1946 with the motto ‘ Education for Service ”. The founding fathers of the College were Mr. W.M. Beveridge, a Scottish missionary, Rev. C.G.Baeta, Rev. R.S. Kwami, Mr. Winfred Addo, Rev. McMillian and Mr. Tom Barton. Members of the teaching staff in 1946 were Mrs. Isa S. Beveridge, Mr. V.O. Anku, Mr. R.Y. Gletsu and Mr. S.K. Agbley. The vision of the College is to position itself to become a reputable College in teacher education, and to be a pace setter in Information Communication Technology education. The College was established with the admission of 30 men. Rev. W.M. Beveridge, was the first principal of the College. In January 1950, the College became a co-educational institution, when it admitted its first batch of 20 female students. AMECO has followed prescribed courses to meet the teacher needs of the country for basic education.

The College has within the sixty years of its existence fulfilled the dreams and aspirations of the founding fathers. AMECO has trained about 6,000 teachers for the nation.

The following principals have administered the College:
Name	Years served
Rev. W.M. Beveridge	1946 – 1962
Mr. T.W. Kwami	1962 – 1973
Mr. W. Otu (Ag.)	1973 – 1974
Mr. M.O. Mireku	1974 – 1976
Mr. A.A Bekui	1976 – 1982
Mr. B.B.K. Adjabeng (Ag.)	1982 – 1983
Mr. I.K. Cudjoe	1983 – 1986
Rev. O.K. Klu	1986 – 1988
Mr. M.A.Y. Fie	1988 – 1995
Mr. V.K. Akude (Ag.)	1995 – 1996
Mr. J.N.K. Fianu	1996 – 2000
Rev. E.K. Gaewu	2000 – 2004
Mr. J.D. Koka	2005

== Programmes ==
The courses it has provided over the years are;

- two-year post middle Teacher's Certificate ‘A’,
- 4-year post middle Teacher's Certificate ‘A’,
- 3-year post secondary Teacher's Certificate ‘A’
- 3-year post secondary Diploma in Basic Education introduced in October, 2004.
- Specialist programme in Home Science introduced in 1974, but later transferred to Aburi.
- 4-year degree in Basic Education introduced in October, 2019
