= Krosbi Mensah =

Ghanaian politician (born 1947)

Hon. Krosbi Mensah

Member of parliament for Afram Plains North constituency
- In office 7 January 1993 – 7 January 1997
- President: Jerry John Rawlings
- Succeeded by: Joseph Tsatsu Agbenu

Personal details
- Born: 5 March 1947 (age 79)
- Party: National Democratic Congress
- Relations: Betty Nana Efua Krosbi Mensah (daughter)
- Education: Prince of Peace College
- Occupation: Politician
- Profession: Businessman

Krosbi Mensah (born 5 March 1947) was a Ghanaian politician who served as member of parliament of the 4th Republic of Ghana, he represented Afram Plains North constituency. He was a member of the National Democratic Congress.

== Early life and education ==
Krosbi Mensah was born on 5 March 1947 in the Eastern Region of Ghana, he studied at Prince of Peace College and obtained his General Certificate of Education (GCE) Ordinary Level.

== Career ==
Mensah was a former member of parliament for Afram Plains North constituency in the Eastern Region of Ghana from 7 January 1993 to 7 January 1997, He was also a Businessman.

== Politics ==
=== Member of parliament ===
Mensah was a member of the parliament of the 1st and 2nd parliaments of the 4th Republic of Ghana for the Afraim Plains North Constituency, spanning from January 1993 to January 2001. He first went to parliament after being declared winner in the 1992 December elections. He retained his seat again in 1996 elections after getting 72% of the total votes cast, he won during the December 1996 Ghanaian General Elections on the ticket of the National Democratic Congress for the Afraim Plains North Constituency in the Eastern Region of Ghana. He polled 18,832 votes out of the valid votes cast representing 61.70% over her opponents Augustine Siaw a NPP member, Amidu Tanko a PNC member, Albert Quarcoo-Zah a CPP member and Krosbi Mensah an NDC member who polled 4,376 votes, 1,684 votes, 1,235 votes and 0 vote respectively. He was later succeeded by Joseph Tsatsu Agbenu in 2001.

== Personal life ==
Mensah was a Christian. He was the father of Betty Krosbi Mensah, who has been since 2017 been serving as the MP for Afram Plains North, the same constituency he served as MP.
