= Donkorkrom =

- Town
- Kwahu North District logo

- Location of Donkorkrom in Eastern Region, Ghana
- Coordinates: 7°3′N 0°3′W
- Country: Ghana
- Region: Eastern Region
- District: Kwahu North District
- Time zone: GMT
  - Summer (DST): GMT

Donkorkrom is a town in south Ghana and is the capital of Kwahu Afram Plains North district, a district in the Eastern Region of Ghana.

== Religion ==
Its Cathedral of Saint Francis Xavier is the see of the Latin Catholic Apostolic Vicariate of Donkorkrom, which was founded in 2007 as an apostolic prefecture.

== Education ==
There are a few senior high schools in the District. Which are

- Donkorkrom Agric Senior High School, DASHS, is a secondary school in Donkorkrom. Hamilton Grammar School,
- St. Mary's Vocational/Technical School
- Amankwa Fisheries/Agricultural Institute

== Transportation ==
Donkorkrom has had its red road concreted, making travel to and from the ferry crossing easier.

== Twin towns and cities ==
List of sister cities of Donkorkrom, designated by Sister Cities International:

	Country	City	County / District / Region / State	Date	Ref.
(Scotland)	Scotland	Hamilton	South Lanarkshire		

- Donkorkrom and Hamilton, Scotland are twinned.
