= Kwahu Afram Plains North (district) =

Kwahu-Afram Plains North District
- District
- Seal

- Districts of Eastern Region

- Location of Kwahu-Afram Plains North District within Eastern
- Coordinates: 7°03′07″N 0°04′48″W
- Country: Ghana
- Region: Eastern
- Capital: Somanya

Government
  - District Executive: Samuel Kena

Population (2021)
  - Total: 66,555
- Time zone: UTC+0 (GMT)
- Note: Donkorkrom has a hotel (St Michael hotel) and a guest house (Genesis gust house) and a hospital.
- Website: Official Website

Kwahu Afram Plains North District is one of the thirty-three districts in Eastern Region, Ghana. Originally it was formerly part of the then-larger Kwahu North District in 1988 (later known as Afram Plains District), until the western part of the district was split off to create Kwahu Afram Plains South District on 19 June 2012; thus the remaining part has been renamed as Kwahu Afram Plains North District. The district assembly is located in the northern part of Eastern Region and has Donkorkrom as its capital town.its a food basket in the eastern region.

== List of settlements ==
Settlements of Kwahu North District
No.	Settlement	Population	Population year
1	Abomosarefo		
2	Adiembra		
3	Agya Atta		
4	Amanfrom		
5	Amankwakrom		
6	Asanyansa		
7	Brumben		
8	Dedeso		
9	Dodi		
10	Donkorkrom		
11	Ekye Tease		
12	Forifori		
13	Kwaekese		
14	Mem Kyemfere		
15	Nsogyaso		
16	Ntonaboma		
17	Odoasua		
18	Odumase		
19	Samanhyia		
