= Betty Krosbi Mensah =

Ghanaian politician (born 1980)

Hon. Betty Krosbi Mensah Former MP
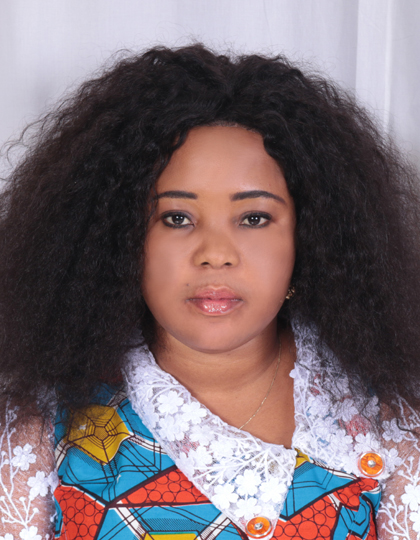

Member of the Ghana Parliament for Afram Plains North constituency
- In office 7 January 2017 – January 2025
- Preceded by: Emmanuel Aboagye Didieye
- Succeeded by: Worlase Kpeli

Personal details
- Born: Betty Nana Efua Krosbi Mensah; 29 August 1980 (age 46) Donkorkrom, Ghana
- Party: National Democratic Congress
- Relations: Krosbi Mensah (father)
- Children: 1
- Education: Zenith University College, Koforidua Technical University
- Occupation: Politician
- Profession: Managing director
- Committees: Gender and Children Committee; Health Committee

Betty Nana Efua Krosbi (also spelled Crosby and Krosby) Mensah, (born August 29, 1980) is a Ghanaian politician and a former Member of Parliament for the 7th and 8th parliament of the republic of Ghana for the Afram Plains North constituency in the Eastern region of Ghana. She is a member of the National Democratic Congress.

== Early life and education ==
Mensah was born on 29 August 1980 in Donkorkrom, Eastern Region. She holds a bachelor's degree in Business Administration from the Zenith University College, and a Higher National Diploma (HND) in Accounting from Koforidua Technical University.

== Career ==
Before she became a Member of Parliament, Mensah was the managing director of Best Pat Ghana Limited from the year 2013 to the year 2016. She also served as the Second Deputy Coordinator for the National Youth Employment from 2009 to 2013. Mensah was also the Gender and Development Coordinator of Ghana Cooperative Credit Union from 2003 to 2005. She is the Vice President of the Young Parliamentarians Forum, Ghana Chapter.

== Politics ==
=== Parliamentary bid ===
In Ghana's 2016 general elections for the Parliamentary seat of Afram Plains, Mensah pulled a total vote count of 18,121 out of 23,606 votes cast representing 78.44% to beat Isaac Ofori-Koree of the New Patriotic Party who had 4,795 votes making 20.8% of the total votes cast, Cornelius Agbeku of the National Democratic Party who had 94 votes making 0.4% of the total votes cast, and Micheal Ampontia of the Convention People's Party who had 91 votes making 0.4% of the total votes cast to win the seat in 7th Parliament of the fourth Republic of Ghana.

=== 2020 election ===
In the 2020 Ghanaian general election, she again won the Afram Plains North Constituency parliamentary seat with 18,543 votes making 68.30% of the total votes cast whilst the NPP parliamentary candidate Isaac Ofori-Koree had 8,605 votes making 31.70% of the total votes cast and the NDP parliamentary candidate Ferguson Asare had 0 vote making 0% of the total votes cast.

=== 2024 election ===
In the 2024 Ghanaian general election, she lost her bid to represent the Afram Plains North (Ghana parliament constituency) for the third time. She lost to the independent candidate, Worlase Kpeli. She polled 10,993 votes representing 44.86%, while her opponent polled 11,452 representing 46.73%.

=== Member of Parliament ===
During the 8th parliament she served as a member on the Gender and Children Committee and Health Committee.

== Personal life ==
Mensah is married with one child. She is the daughter of Krosbi Mensah, the first MP for Afram Plains Constituency. She is a Christian and worships as a Roman Catholic.

== Philanthropy ==
In July 2021, Mensah donated a laptop to Michael Awingura, a student of the University of Ghana.

In June 2022, she donated materials to the educational sector, agricultural sector and hospital equipment to the health sector in the Afram Plains North Constituency.
