= Samson Oppong =

Ghanaian prophet-preacher

Samson Kwame Oppong
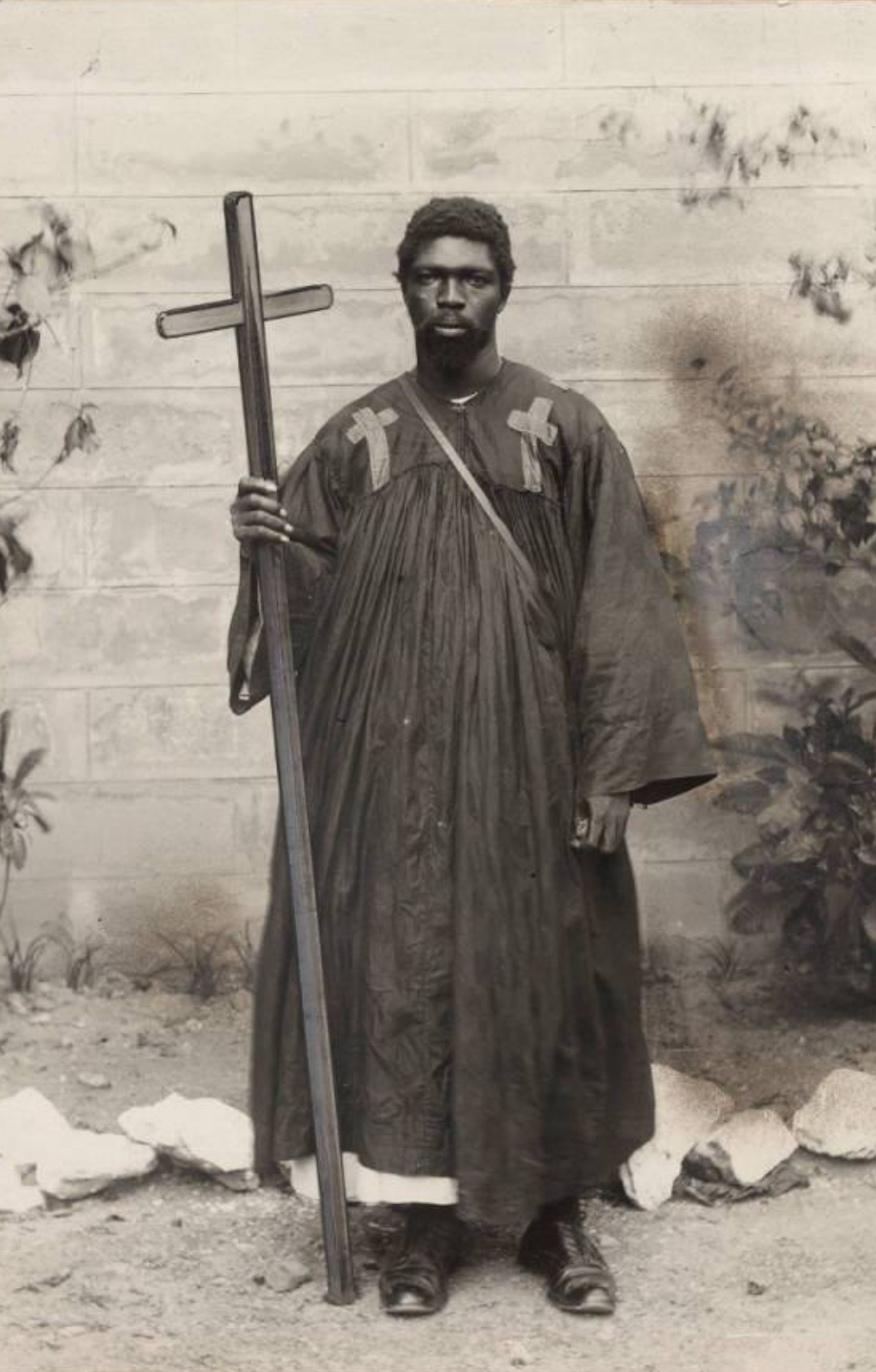
- Samson Oppong

Personal life
- Born: Kwame Oppong c. 1884 Akuntanim, Gold Coast
- Died: c.1960 or 1965 (aged 76 or 81) Akuntanim, Ghana

Religious life
- Religion: Christianity (evangelical Protestantism)
- Denomination: Methodist
- Church: Wesleyan Methodist Missionary Society
- Profession: Evangelist

Samson Kwame Oppong also Sampson Opon or Opong (c. 1884 – c.1960 or 1965) was a controversial Akan Christian preacher-prophet on the Gold Coast in the 1920s. His missionary zeal, unconventional and fiery ministry helped entrench Methodism in the Ashanti and Brong-Ahafo Regions of Ghana, through a large-scale spiritual awakening and revival. Though his knowledge of Christian theology was minimal, he is known to have employed threats and other coercive techniques to proselytise in the Ghanaian towns and villages he worked in.

== Early life ==
Born Kwame Oppong in a slave family, he was owned by a wealthy man named Kofi Dom in Akuntanim, a Bono village near Berekum and the Ivorian border, about 64km (40 miles) west of Sunyani, the capital of the Brong Ahafo Region of Ghana. Very little is known of the exact circumstances of his birth. Oppong recalled that he was about 12 years old when the Asantehene, Prempeh I was exiled by the British to the Seychelles. In an interview with his biographer, Hans Werner Debrunner, a Swiss German historian, Samson Oppong traced his ancestry to the Upper Volta, known today as Burkina Faso. Oppong's father, Yaw Kyerema was a Grunshie slave who had been a captive of Samory Touré, a nineteenth-century fearsome adventurist and warrior who founded a kingdom from modern day Guinea to Burkina Faso. Oppong father was eventually sold to Kofi Dom at Akuntanim in the Bong-Ahafo Region and held an important position in his master's household. Thus, Samson Oppong traced and identified his direct lineage to the Bono people, whose southern neighbours were the Asantes. Kyerema had two wives, an Ashanti woman and a slave of Northern extraction. In his childhood, Oppong was influenced by the brother of his Ashanti step-mother, a fetish priest and a traditional healer or shaman who adhered to the native Akan religion. In time, Oppong came to acquire the knowledge of herbal medicine through sorcery which had a spiritual basis in Akan religious thought for protection from foes, wealth acquisition, display of power, harming opponents and withstanding unrequited love. The natives in the villages viewed Oppong as a sorcerer who dabbled in magic potions and malevolent charms.

Samson Oppong noted in the Twi language,“When I grew older, I became a healer (oduruyefo) and a magician (osumanni). In the course of time, I gained the following medicines or amulets (aduru, suman):

- Amanfo: An amulet that protects whoever wears it from bullets and knives. Anyone wanting to fire at the wearer of such an amulet would find the gun exploding in his hand. The knife of an attacker would break in his hand
- Nsuapem: When the enemy sees anyone wearing such an amulet he would stand as though rooted to the ground by the magical power
- Wuramumu: This amulet is shaped like a little pair of bellows. If one uses them and calls the name of one’s enemy, his stomach will distend and he will suffer terrible pain.
- Penyan: This amulet will help one find buyers for one’s goods.
- Basaa: If one throws this amulet into the air it will stay there and everyone will see that one is powerful and not to be trifled with
- Ohye: If one puts this medicine into the soup of a woman who scorns one’s love, she must die.
- Afuto-sapu-gyina-makpe: A powerful magic [that] will kill twelve enemies at one blow”

== Conversion experience ==
The Anglo-Ashanti Wars between the British and Ashanti empires, along with the subsequent colonisation of the region by Britain, resulted in the abolishment of domestic slavery in Asante sometime between 1896 and 1901. This enabled Samson Oppong to travel to the Ivory Coast, as a free person. There, he worked as labourer with a group involved in railroad construction and supplying wood for the running of locomotives. By dint of hard work, he rose to become the gang leader or foreman. Tasked with collecting weekly wages and distributing various sums to his co-workers, he misappropriated and bolted with the group's salaries to a faraway village where he was accused of having affairs with a policeman's wife as well as many other women. He also spent the looted cash on alcohol. The cop's wife eventually tipped the police and he was subsequently arrested in 1913 and jailed for his crimes. He met an elderly Fante Christian in jail called Moses who “prayerfully commended him to God’s keeping”, a behaviour Oppong disliked. Oppong resisted conversion and baptism while in prison. On the night Moses was released from prison, Oppong asked Moses for money to which he responded, “I have no money but that which I have I shall give you. I commend you into God’s keeping.” Already famished, this response infuriated Samson Oppong and when he calmed down, he prayed “God of Moses, have pity on me.” He had a dream in which two Europeans came to his cell and the older of the two hacksawed off his chains. Oppong recalled that he heard a voice saying, “I am the God of Moses. Burn your magic things and beat the gong for me [proclaim my Word].” At dawn the following morning, the prison guards chained and took him and other prisoners to weed the bungalow compounds of the European civil servants. Shortly thereafter, the French District Commissioner informed him that he had been granted a conditional release pending court appearance and was required to stay for a week at the District Commissioner's home.

He stayed there for three days before escaping to Ghana to continue his herbal medical practice. He then went through cycles of imprisonment, admonitory experiences, dreams of being freed, actual release from prison, short acquaintances with Christians, return to traditional healing and then back to jail for a third time. Upon returning to the Gold Coast, Oppong found work as a labourer on cocoa farms in the Asante Akyem and Akyem Abuakwa areas. Oppong received catechism lessons at the Basel Mission station in Bompata, about 64km (40 mi) east of Kumasi in the Asante-Akyem district. Cocoa farming was a thriving and lucrative industry during this period. He went to Wankyi near Bompata, where he worked for a Christian woman. She was a congregant at the Basel mission church there and taught Oppong the Lord's Prayer through his catechesis classes. Within the Christmas period, Oppong heard the nativity story for the first time. On Christmas Day, he bribed his way to the fully packed Basel church. The parishioners viewed him as a magician and were suspicious of his presence. Oppong walked up to the priest and wrote his name down as a catechumen or new convert. Once again, he resisted conversion to Christianity because “he did not want to learn to read and write as a schoolboy.” Besides, the children in his village made fun of him for attending Christian classes. He wanted to return to magic healing which was a huge source of income for him. His interaction with the church was therefore non-continuous.

Oppong went to Osiem near Tafo and later to Nkoronso near Apedwa. There, he practised his trade as a sorcerer under the alias “Sebewie” (by magic he brings life). He occasionally attended the church at Nkoronso with a woman co-tenant. He fell out with the woman over her frequent mention of Jesus Christ in her prayers. He attempted to ‘spiritually kill’ this co-tenant with a magic potion but his attempts failed.

It is said that his conversion experience came in 1917 in Akyem-Abuakwa while “he was preparing a charm to kill somebody by magic.” He had been approached by a boy who promised to pay him a lot of money if he killed an uncle whose wealth the said boy would inherit. The young man wanted to also marry his uncle's wife. He went to the forest one Thursday to perform the sorcery rites to eliminate the man. According to Oppong, “I was looking down eagerly to see whether the magic was succeeding when suddenly I heard voices behind me: ‘stand up’, they said. Two men were standing there. I stood up and suddenly I found myself in a large town with many Europeans. They were all hurrying towards a large square, and so was I. there I saw all my magic amulets and medicines heaped up in a huge pile, together with all the sheep and chickens I had acquired unlawfully by my magic. A big glorious-looking man came towards me and said: “I am the God of Moses, who freed you from prison in the Ivory Coast. Why are you still living in sin? Go, I am sending you… Take up my cross and preach about it to all the world.” “I can’t speak English, I can’t read. How can I preach?” “I shall go with you.”

A divine command then directed him “to burn his magic apparatus and to proclaim God’s wrath on all “fetishism”. A search party of villagers went to the forest to look for him and found him lying on the ground in a comatose state. The villagers revived him but Oppong could neither walk nor talk. When he arrived at his house, he gathered all the item/material attributes he used for magic in the practice of the Akan religion and declared, “Today I have found one stronger than you. God has called me into his service. Now I am burning you.” He poured petrol on his objects and burnt them. He thus transitioned from ‘Sebewie’ as he was known to his adherents to Sebetutu or Osebetutu (one who takes away amulets in the Akan language).

He was baptised by the Rev. Ofosuhene of the African Methodist Episcopal Zion Church, assumed the name Samson and subsequently donned his own ministerial garb of a long black robe with a huge cross in the middle and a red cross on either shoulder, with hair falling to his shoulders. He also wielded a gigantic bamboo crucifix and became loosely affiliated to the A. M. E. Zion Church. His vestments were sewn by a local tailor while his crucifix was made by a carpenter in his town. Initially, his missionary work was independent of the mission societies.

== Evangelism ==
Earlier 1910, the British Methodist missionary, the Rev. W. G. Waterworth was posed to Asante to reinvigorate the Christian mission there. By then, slightly more than thousand Christians who were mainly drawn from Fante settlers, merchants and civil servants, lived in Asante. Waterworth was unsuccessful in his missionary activities, which had stalled considerably. Besides, the Asantes were fiercely opposed to Christianity which they perceived as the ‘foreign religion of the victor,’ given that Asantes had lost three Anglo-Asante wars in 1874, 1896 and 1901.

In 1920, Samson Oppong, who was described as a “tall, strongly built Ashanti” went to the Methodist mission house dressed in a “long, black robe with a red cross on either shoulder and a larger red cross in the centre.” He held a large bamboo cross in one hand and carried a flat oval stone in the other which he linked to the Biblical verse, Revelation 2:17 NIV “Whoever has ears, let them hear what the Spirit says to the churches. To the one who is victorious, I will give some of the hidden manna. I will also give that person a white stone with a new name written on it, known only to the one who receives it.”

Waterworth recognised Oppong from third party accounts as “the Ashanti prophet, who had for several months been preaching a fiery call to repentance in many towns in the heart of the Ashanti forest.” Oppong and Waterworth exchanged pleasantries, narrating how he came to believe in the Christian faith and the ensuing difficulties he encountered in the process. Oppong also highlighted the strides he had made in making converts in the thousands. Waterworth partnered with Oppong in missionising in Asante. For three weeks, they travelled together preaching in the Ashanti forested areas. According to Debrunner, “A dozen times a day Sampson Opong gave his message, and the missionary who had become almost heartbroken over the apathy of former audiences, saw the people break down before the Cross in hundreds…Chiefs and people alike turned from idols to serve the living God. Numbers of priests joined the seekers after truth, burning their fetishes and the secret symbols of their trade. Other priests who would not yield to the compelling power of that strange movement had to flee from their towns and hide in secret. In less than two years, more than ten thousand Ashanti had been baptised and hundreds more were in the point of deciding for Christ.” He was said to have accosted powerful chieftains and troubled the British colonial authorities. His evangelism was compelling as it combined humour and manipulation to downplay the “uncanny, fanatical, hypnotic power” of tribal fetishes he wanted destroyed.

A few years later, Oppong, an illiterate who never learnt how to read and write, said the “holy stone” obtained while imprisoned at Juaso, about 64 km (40 miles), east-south-east of Kumasi, gifted him psychic powers to “read the whole Bible from Genesis to Revelation thanks to the Holy Spirit.” He had started his ministry in Bompata and shortly thereafter went to the Obogu district. At Bamso, Oppong called an influential woman a witch. She grabbed his cross to prove her innocence but then experienced a ‘demonic possession’ that drove her to the forest. The paramount chief of Kumawu reported the incident to the District Commissioner at Juaso. He was subsequently arrested, tried and given a five-month jail term. His wooden crucifix was crushed to pieces. The Governor of the Gold Coast came to Juaso upon hearing the story and declared Oppong innocent. Nonetheless, Oppong was not released from jail and served his full term.

In 1923, he went on a preaching tour of Cape Coast. A local newspaper, the Gold Coast Leader, provided the following commentary in its 27 October 1923 issue, “This man, an uneducated peasant…saw the vision of the cross of the risen Jesus, and was compelled to preach to the Ashantis. He carried a wooden cross and a stone wrapped in a handkerchief. From looking at the stone, he cites with great exactness and precision every text from the Book of Life. He surprised Cape Coast.”

The theology and missiology scholar, M. A. Kwamena-Poh further observed, “At this time Sampson Opon had some similarities to John Wesley (1703-91), the English founder of the Methodist movement. Like Wesley he had undergone the experience of conversion, and like Wesley he decided to bring to others the faith he had found. Like Wesley, too, he won converts by using appeals to fear and pity, with threats of hell fire, promises of Heaven, wildly emotional oratory, and hymn singing. But, unlike Wesley, he was a criminal turned evangelist. Perhaps it was these resemblances to Wesley which attracted the Methodist to Opon, and made them decide to use his services. He toured Asante with the Rev. W. C. Waterworth, arousing intense emotions, and baptizing about 10,000 people in less than two years. The Basel Mission, on the other hand, saw in him only a “big fetish man” with a thin veneer of Christianity.” Other scholars of mission history posit that Oppong was “a real prophet cast in the mould of Elijah or John the Baptist and called ‘to break the power of fetishism in Ghana and to alter fundamentally the history of Ashanti’.”

As reported by Debrunner, Samson Oppong often threatened prospective converts with the message, “Don’t believe in fetishes [religious objects]. Burn all your magic things. If you do not change your ways, God will let fire rain down upon your village.” His approach proved to be effective as ten thousand people, including Asante royalty and fetish priests (akomfoɔ) were baptised in the first two years of his ministry, and in 1923, Oppong hit the 20,000-convert milestone. Overall, he baptised 110,000 of which sixty thousand remained with the Methodist church by the end of his ministry, which far exceeded the modicum of success achieved by European missionaries. Oppong's usage of crude language or profanity led to accusations by the Basel missionary, W. Schafer, of him being a fraud, engaged in witchcraft and sorcery through subjective visions.

The impact of this mass Christian revival was immense in Asante. A large Methodist church was built in Adum, Kumasi to accommodate the large numbers of converts. In 1924, the Methodist Synod passed a resolution to build its first normal school or teacher-training college in the country, the Wesley Training College in Kumasi, financed by Fante Methodists and officially inaugurated in 1929. The original plan was to establish the school on the coast where majority of native Christians lived. The establishment of the seminary and widescale ministry allowed Asante men to enter the Methodist priesthood.

External factors that aided Oppong's ministry include the development of roads and railways in Asante, making transportation easier and the opening of schools by the colonial government. Other sociopolitical, cultural and administrative factors that helped Oppong were the failure of the British authorities to fully understand Asante chieftaincy and culture coupled with the realisation of the Asante people that Christianity was not only for Europeans or coastal dwellers like the Fantes at Cape Coast. Th expansion of Oppong's ministry in Asante thus completed the work, Thomas Birch Freeman had started nearly a century earlier.

== Later years ==
Under the influence of his nephew, Oppong became an alcoholic in his later years. Echoing the Biblical Samson who lost his legendary strength under the influence of Delilah, the English Methodist minister, Arthur Eustace Southon explained that alcohol was Oppong Achilles’ heel. Lacking discipline and spiritual preparation, he lost his electrifying preaching and prophetic abilities and the power to read the Bible using the black stone. Furthermore, the Methodist ministers on the coast saw him as haughty and arrogant. Southon surmised that “Pride and deep-seated hatred of the Fante people, finished what the subtle scheme of the fetish priest had begun and Sampson Oppong fell to yet lower deaths of shame.”

Given that his village was under the jurisdiction of Dormaa, the paramount chief summoned him to his court and as a subject and he had no choice but to obey the king. In 1928 or 1929, he was convicted in a traditional court for sexual assault on a close relation. As a result, he was ostracised and expelled by the Wesleyan Methodist community, the mission compounds or Christian village and the coastal Fante ministers, whose uppity and elitist mannerisms Oppong particularly disdained. He became a subsistence farmer much later. The Basel missionary, W. Schafer remarked that Samson Oppong “lived in the bush with two or more wives, cultivated cocoa and drank a great deal of palm wine.” He eventually returned to the Methodist church and became an itinerant preacher in his hometown, Akuntanim, albeit with less zeal.

== Death and legacy ==
Oppong died in 1960 or 1965 per varying accounts but circumstances of his death are unknown. In the context of his relatively short but sensational ministry between 1920 and 1926, the indigenous contribution of Samson Oppong can thus be aligned to what scholar, Dana L. Robert noted on Western mission-initiated African churches, “The church becomes an inclusive body when people are considered partners rather than objects: being a mission of the people is significantly different from being a mission to the people. True inclusivity is not a program, but a result of welcoming people into the family.”

=== Parallel paradigms and exemplars ===
In the broader context, the phenomenal growth of Methodism in Ashanti mirrors the evangelical ministry of an educated Liberian Kru native of Glebo ethnicity, William Wade Harris (1850-1929) who was a spirit Baptist. In 1914, the Gold Coast and southern Côte d'Ivoire experienced a wave of charismatic conversions. William Wade Harris and John Swatson worked further West while Oppong worked in Asante. Other independent evangelicals in West Africa were Moses Orimolade, Babalola Ositelu, Simon Kimbangu, Peter Anim, Garrick Braide (Delta) and T.J. Marshall, a Methodist pioneer in Porto Novo. The evangelical ministries of Harris and Oppong ushered in an epoch of African independence from European missionary control and self-expression in the church. This can be situated against the mushrooming of other indigenous churches such as the Musama Disco Christo Church, the Saviours Church (Memena Gyidifo), the Church of the Twelve Apostles (started by Grace Tani of Ankobra Mouth and John Nackabah of Essuawa) and the African Faith Tabernacle Church. The exponential explosion meant that many churches were overwhelmed by sheer numbers of converts and adherents. Harris encouraged his converts to wait for orthodox missionaries while Oppong became valuable to Ghanaian Methodism. The mass activities were particularly attractive to Africans who had not interacted a priori with European Christian missionaries. These Pentecostal renewals were largely at odds with both traditional liturgical formalism and nominalism of mainstream European Christianity.

==== William Wade Harris ====
Harris, born in Cape Palmas, Liberia, is reputed to have converted 120,000 adults to Christianity within eighteen months to two years, covering Liberia, Ivory Coast and western Gold Coast. He was educated by missionaries from the A.M.E. Zion church where he learned to read and write in both his native language and in English. He worked as a teacher, warden and headmaster of a small Episcopal boarding school. In 1910, he was jailed in Liberia for political activism and campaigning against the Americo-Liberian government policies that discriminated against ethnic Krus. While in prison, he claimed that he had a trance-visitation from biblical Angel Gabriel, Moses and Elijah leading to his call in prophetic ministry. His standard attire became a white robe. He preached on a Jesus Christ Gospel-centered scriptural monotheism and spoke against idolatry, manifested through charms and amulets. He baptised his followers and encouraged them to lead exemplary lives in their community. Like Oppong, he asked the people to burn their fetishes. Harris was a forerunner in Pentecostalism in Ghana thought he never started his own church. He also incorporated herbal healing into his ministry. He advocated an English education, teetotalism/temperance, obedience to authority and cleanliness. His ministry denounced adultery but nonetheless, co-opted polygamy, which was permissible in traditional society. This stance was supported by John Ahui, a Wesleyan Methodist church choirmaster and the son of an Ivorian chieftain. In Côte d'Ivoire, Harris converted 100,000 people which alarmed the authorities resulting in his deportation by the French colonial government. He made 8000 converts in Apollonia and the neighbouring Nzema villages in the Axim areas. With skyrocketing church membership, villagers made request after request to the Methodist mission for schools and teachers-catechists. Commenting on the multiethnic, trans-colonial, non-denominational nature of Harris’ ministry, a French missionary stated, “His faith is nourished by verses borrowed by the Scriptures. He lives in the supernatural world in which the people, ideas, the affirmations, cosmology and eschatology of the Bible are more real than the things he sees and hears materially.”

==== John Swatson ====
John Swatson was a Euro-African mulatto, born to a European father and a local woman from an Nzema royal family, attached to the royal court of the Beyin monarch in southwestern Ghana. He attended Methodist schools and became a teacher-catechist. Inspired by the charismatic renewal work of William Harris, he resigned from the Methodist Church to become Prophet Harris’ disciple. He wore a “flowing gown and carrying a cross, a Bible and a bowl of baptismal water like his teacher and model” and proselytised in the northern hinterlands of the Western region of Ghana. His work caught the attention of the Anglicans who licensed and ordained him an itinerant preacher in Nzema country, with his headquarters planted in his hometown, Beyin. He fell out with the Bishop of the Anglican Diocese, Bishop Anglioby over theological differences. Anglioby had earlier commissioned Swatson into the ministry. Depressed, Harris withdrew from society until his death in old age.

==== Peter Anim ====
Peter Anim was born on 4 February 1890 and attended Presbyterian schools, before working as a weighing clerk at the Basel Mission Factory. He left his factory job due to persistent illness and returned to Boso, his hometown where he married an Akan woman and raised four daughters. He became acquainted with Pastor A. Clark, founder of the Faith Tabernacle Church, Philadelphia and editor of the Christian periodical, The Sword of the Spirit. The tabernacle pursued faith healing as part of its practices which was alien to the Presbyterian-raised Anim. He got cured of guinea worm infestation and chronic digestive disease through faith healing. Subsequently, he started his own faith healing practice at Asamankese, which he later christened, Faith Tabernacle, with an emphasis of personal holiness and staunch opposition to prosperity theology and speaking in tongues. He resigned from the Presbyterian church. Pastor Clark mailed an ordination certificate to Anim in 1923, officially qualifying him as a pastor. While building his ministry, he came across another periodical, Pentecostal, The Apostolic Faith that piqued his interest. This publication was owned by the Apostolic Faith Evangelistic Organization, of Portland Oregon. Eventually, he resigned from the Faith Tabernacle in 1930 and changed his ministry's name to Apostolic Faith. A colleague Faith Tabernacle pastor from Nigeria, David O. Odubanjo introduced him to the missionaries of the Apostolic Church of Bradford UK. Ultimately, after a series of visits by Apostolic missionaries, notably George Perfect (1931) and James McKeown (1937), Anim aligned his movement to the Apostolic Church of the UK. Later, Anim broke away from the mother church due to disagreements with his British counterparts and renamed his church, the Christ Apostolic Church International (CACI) in 1939.
