= Joseph Egyir-Paintsir =

Ghanaian Evangelist

Late Aps. Joseph Egyir-Paintsil
- Born: May 28, 1928; Mbrom, Ashanti Region – Ghana
- Died: 1981
- Spouse: Victoria Vivian
- Children: 4
- Parent(s): Kojo Paintsil; Adjoa Kwansima
- Religion: Christianity
- Congregations served: The Church of Pentecost
- Offices held: 1st General Secretary
- Title: Apostle, The Church of Pentecost

Joseph Egyir-Paintsil (1928-1981) was a Ghanaian Evangelist, an Apostle and the first General Secretary of The Church of Pentecost (COP). He was the eighth son born of Opanyin Kojo Paintsir and Maame Adjoa Kwansima, a native of Abura-Dunkwa in the Central Region (Ghana). He was called into full-time ministry of COP in 1949, ordained as a Pastor in 1952 and, subsequently, appointed General Secretary the same year.

== Education and employment ==
Egyir-Paintsil started his primary school education at the Salvation Army School, Kumasi in 1934 and completed it at Dunkwa Methodist, passing with distinction. He was awarded a scholarship to attend Achimota College but, due to financial constraint, he could not attend.

Rev. Egyir-Paintsil was employed by the Swiss United African Company.

== Marriage ==
Egyir-Paintsil was married to Vivian Amma Baawa Arkosah in 1954 at Kumasi. They had four children from the marriage: Joseph K. Paintsir, Elizabeth Jemimah Lamont Nana-Aba Paintsil, Sophia McKeown Araba Kokoa Paintsil and Victoria Patience Adjoa Paintsir.

== Full time ministry ==
Asare Bediako claims Joseph Egyir-Paintsil inteprated Rev. James McKeown sermons and was part of an evangelistic group known among Ghanaian Pentecostal as "the Bombers". He was called into full-time ministry and stationed at Akim Oda as an Overseer in 1949. He was ordained as a Pastor and an Apostle in 1952 and 1953, respectively.

Throughout his career Egyir-Paintsir served in Akim Oda (1950), Saltpond (1950–1951), Achiase (1951–1952), Accra (1952–1953), Koforidua (1953), Takoradi (1953–1958), Kumasi (1958–1965), and Accra (1965–1981).

== Administration ==
Joseph Egyir-Paintsil served as the first General Secretary of The Church of Pentecost (COP). The Church claims that he supported the founder of (COP), Rev. James McKeown during the conflicts between the Church of Pentecost and Ghana Apostolic Church.

In order to resolve the dispute, Osagyefo Kwame Nkrumah met leadership of C.O.P and Apostolic Church of Ghana. It is believed that Rev. Paintsil impressed the first President of the Country that he told his confidants at the meeting, Dowuona Hammond (Minister of Education) and Tawia Adamafio (Minister of Interior): "This young man Paintsil is highly intelligent and a nationalist. His church will stand." Among the roles played by Paintsil at the Head Office after the rebranding of the church were;

He represented the church during its affiliation process with the Elim Pentecostal Church. This resulted in the church hosting Missionaries from Elim, receiving support in training of officers and support for establishing a Press House. The birth of Pentecost Fire and Radio Ministry was realized because of his collaboration with Mr. Kafui Asem.

Together with Rev. James McKeown, he performed the opening ceremony Pentecost Bible College in 1972 which is now Pentecost University College.

== Relationship with other organization ==
Apostle Egyir-Paintsil was one of the founding members of the Ghana Pentecostal and Charismatic Council. He served as its first vice-chairman and later president till his death. He supported the Bible Society Ghana and translated many sermons, from international evangelists who ministered in Ghana during his time in office, into local dialects.
