= Michael Kwabena Ntumy =

Ghanaian Pentecostal clergyman (1958–2023)

- Born: 22 September 1958; Dadieso, Oti Region, Ghana
- Died: 27 December 2023 (aged 65); Germany
- Spouse: Martha Ntumy
- Children: 6
- Religion: Christianity
- Church: The Church of Pentecost
- Title: Apostle Doctor

Michael Kwabena Ntumy (22 September 1958 – 27 December 2023) was a Ghanaian Pentecostal televangelist, an Apostle, and the fourth Chairman of The Church of Pentecost (COP) from 1998 to 2008.

== Biography ==
Michael Ntumy was born in [Osramane-Dadease], Oti Region, Ghana on 22 September 1958. He was a teacher in Yendi in the 1980s before, becoming a Deacon and Elder, before marrying Martha at 24. He began full-time ministry at 26 with the Church of Pentecost. He was called to the office of an Apostle at 33 and six years after, was elected the fourth Chairman of The Church of Pentecost. After serving two terms (10 years), he handed over to Opoku Onyinah.

Ntumy was held hostage during the First Liberian Civil War attacks on his life ranging from physical assaults to poisoning and later suffered paralysis leading to use of a wheelchair. He served the church in Liberia and Ivory Coast.

Ntumy died on 27 December 2023, at the age of 65.

== Positions held and awards ==
- Director of Literary Works, The Church of Pentecost
- Chairman (International President) of The Church of Pentecost (1998–2008)
- President, Ghana Pentecostal and Charismatic Council (1998–2008)
- Vice-president/President, Bible Society of Ghana (2000–2008)
- Chancellor, Pentecost University College (2003–2008)
- Member, Ghana AIDS Commission (2003–2008)
- National Award Laureate, Order of the Volta, Companion (Civil Division) (2006)
- Minister of The Church of Pentecost since 1984
- Missionary of The Church of Pentecost to Liberia, Ivory Coast, France/Switzerland (1988–1998)

== See also ==
- The Church of Pentecost
- Pentecost University College
- Ghana Peace Council
