= Christ Apostolic Church International =

Pentecostal Evangelical church

Christ Apostolic Church Int
- Classification: Pentecostal
- Theology: Evangelical
- Chairman: Apostle Samuel Amponsah-Frimpong
- Headquarters: Osu, Ghana
- Founder: Peter Anim Newman
- Official website: cac-int.org

Christ Apostolic Church International

Is a Pentecostal Evangelical church which traces its existence from the ministry of the late Apostle Peter Anim, the originator of Ghanaian Pentecostalism. It had a humble beginning as a prayer group started in 1917 at Asamankese, but later received affiliation with Apostolic Church Bradford.

== History ==
Peter Anim Newman began a healing ministry in 1917 under the name Faith Tabernacle as a result of healing received from acute stomach upset and guinea worms infections after he read a magazine published by Faith Tabernacle USA called Sword of Spirit.

In 1931, Anim, through a fellow Faith Tabernacle minister in Nigeria, David O. Odubanjo, contacted missionaries of the Apostolic Church of Bradford, to pay his team a visit. Rev George Perfect, a missionary sent by Apostolic Church Bradford to Nigeria, passed by Asamankese in Ghana and stayed with the Faith Tabernacle church for two weeks. An agreement was met between Rev George Perfect and Anim. Anim and his members fully embraced the doctrine and practices of the Apostolic Church Bradford. Hence, Anim's church became The Apostolic Church Gold Coast. A year later, a major "Holy Ghost Outpouring" was experienced. Healing, miracles and salvation were greatly recorded and therefore impacted the growth of the ministry numerically.

They requested an external missionary from Bradford, and the request was granted in 1937: James McKeown was sent as the first Pentecostal missionary from the UK to Asamankese.

The church by then practiced strictly divine healing.When McKeown contracted malaria and was subsequently hospitalized in the European Hospital in Ghana. He responded successfully to treatment. However, he faced hostility from the Church which felt betrayed by their missionary receiving medical treatment against their teachings. This disagreement led to division within the Church. The followers of McKeown remained the name Apostolic Church Bradford whilst the followers of Anim became Christ Apostolic Church.

== See also ==
- The Church of Pentecost
- The Apostolic Church - Ghana
