= The Apostolic Church – Ghana =

Pentecostal Christian denomination

The Apostolic Church - Ghana
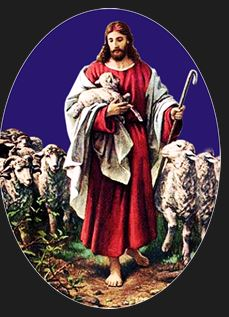
- Classification: Pentecostal
- Theology: Trinitarian Evangelical
- President: Apostle (Dr.) Aaron Ami-Narh
- Headquarters: Accra, Ghana
- Official website: theapostolicchurch.org.gh

The Apostolic Church - Ghana is a denomination emanating from the Pentecostal movement which started from the 1904–1905 Welsh revival. It practices self-governing and claims to own local churches in every district in Ghana and foreign mission fields with its headquarters in Adenta-Accra, Ghana. The church is firmly identified as a Pentecostal, Trinitarian, Evangelical and Bible-believing church.

== History ==
The Apostolic Church – Ghana is a denomination emanated from the Pentecostal movement which started from the 1904–1905 Welsh revival. It practices self-governing and claims to own local churches in every district in Ghana and foreign mission fields with its headquarters in Adenta-Accra, Ghana. The church is firmly identified as a Pentecostal, Trinitarian, Evangelical and Bible-believing church with the aim of bringing the good news of Jesus Christ as savior and lord to all people. It is further dedicated to teaching and living with the power of the Holy Spirit. The church accepts everyone irrespective of who they are, and disciples them to accomplish God's purpose.

In March 2026, the Church banned the kissing of brides during marriage ceremonies.

== Welsh revival ==
In 1904-1905, Wales experienced an outbreak of revival. Pentecostal groups sprung up with a clear belief in the five-fold ministry (Ephesians 4:11) and the operation of the nine gifts of the Holy Spirit as recorded in 1 Corinthians 12:1-11. The Apostolic doctrine became phenomenal in the young fellowship. Daniel Powell and Jones Williams were ordained as apostle and prophet in the Church.

The Gold Coast, modern Ghana, was no exception to the spread of Pentecostalism. Faith Tabernacle of Nigeria was thus introduced to a group of Christians at a small town in the Eastern Region of Ghana called Asamankese.

== The birth of Ghanaian Pentecostalism ==
The group, led by Peter Anim Newman, then requested the Apostolic Church in Bradford, England, to send a delegation to visit them. Pastor George Perfect was sent to Asamankese in 1935. Pastor Peter Newman Anim was ordained a pastor eventually after the fellowship accepted to follow the core belief of the Apostolic Church Bradford. Pastor James and Mrs. Sophia McKeown were sent as the first resident missionaries. Due to a doctrinal difference between James McKeown and some members about divine healing, the group split with Newman, leading a faction of the church to form Christ Apostolic Church Ghana in 1938.

== The spread of the church ==
The church headquarters was moved to Cape Coast in 1941 and Pastor McKeown was Superintendent Missionary. Pastors R.S. Asomaning, J.A.C. Anaman, J.A. Bimpong, D.K. Boateng, S.K. Frimpong and others supported him.

Pastors Lartey Adotey, A.S. Mallet, C.K. Diaba and Elder Q.A.L. Quarshie pioneered the establishment of a branch in Accra in 1944. This branch under the leadership of the late Pastor Anaman expanded so quickly that in 1984 the headquarters of the church was moved to Accra. Pastor C. B. Sercombe, Pastor Adams McKeown, Pastor Albert Seaborne and Pastor S. M. Hammond were all sent out by the Apostolic Church UK to strengthen the church. Other missionaries like Pastors H. L. Copp and C.H. Rosser in 1962, F. Johnson and Pastor P.W. Cawthorne in 1971, and E. H. Williams also were later sent to assist.

In 1953 some of the membership followed McKeown to form the Gold Coast Apostolic Church, which subsequently became the Church of Pentecost in 1962. The further claims that the Divine Healers Church, the Apostolic Reformed Church and the New Covenant Apostolic were all formed out of the Apostolic Church - Ghana.

The church in Ghana claims to have established 1,500 local churches in Ghana. It has been instrumental in establishing mission fields in Togo, Benin, Burkina Faso, Cote D'Ivoire, and the United States. From 1982 through 1985 Apostle A. Ofori-Addo served as the first Ghanaian Field chairman of the church. In 1985, the Church in Ghana attained autonomy, and Apostle A. Ofori-Addo became the first president.

== The current state of the Apostolic Church - Ghana and leaders ==
The number of administrative areas increased from 36 in 2011 to 50 in 2014, with a commensurate increase in the numbers of districts, ministers and members. The financial capacity has been strengthened, and new units set up have improved the church's administrative acumen. Construction work of the New Headquarters (Nehemiah Project) has been completed and inaugurated and it lies in the outskirt of Accra in the Greater Accra Region of Ghana.

There is a National Executive which ensures that the decisions and policies of the General Council are implemented. The Executive is composed of the President, the Vice President, the General Secretary and four other apostles appointed by the General Council. The executive may co-opt other persons as when and where their services would be required.

The incumbent president is Apostle Dr. Aaron Ami-Narh, Apostle Christopher Affum-Nyarko is the Vice President and the General Secretary is Apostle Alex Boateng.
