= Opoku Onyinah =

Ghanaian theologian, televangelist and composer

- Born: Joseph Kwadwo Nimfour Opoku Onyinah; July 22, 1954 (age 71); Aduman, Ashanti Region - Ghana
- Spouse: Grace Adwapa Onyinah
- Children: 5
- Parent(s): Kwame Onyinah; Akosua Addai
- Religion: Christianity
- Church: The Church of Pentecost
- Offices held: Chairman
- Title: Apostle Professor

Apostle Professor Kwadwo Nimfour Opoku Onyinah (born July 22, 1954) is a Ghanaian theologian, televangelist, composer, and the fifth chairman of The Church of Pentecost, serving from 2008 to 2018. He holds a Doctor of Philosophy in theological studies from the University of Birmingham (2002) and a Master of Theology in applied theology from Regents Theological College. Onyinah joined the ministry of The Church of Pentecost in 1976 and has served in various capacities, including rector of Pentecost University College and the church's first International Missions Director. He founded the Pentecost International Worship Centre in 1993. He is regarded as the last of the Apostles who served alongside the founder of The Church of Pentecost, Pastor James McKeown. Beyond his role in the church, Onyinah has served in several national and international bodies, including as president of the Ghana Pentecostal and Charismatic Council (2011–2019) and as a member of the National Peace Council of Ghana.

== Early life and education ==
Opoku Onyinah was born to Opanin Kwame Onyinah and Maame Rebecca Akosua Addai of Aduman about 7:00 am in a local maternity home in the town. As per Akan tradition, he was named after his grand-uncle, a popular chief of Dwumakyi village called Opanin Nimfour. He grew up with the name "Koofour" an abridged form of Kwadwo Nimfour.

22 July was adopted as his official birthday though his Catholic Baptism Certificate bears 24 July as his birthday. He started his basic education at Yamfo Presbyterian Primary School and completed Middle Form Four at Yamfo Catholic Middle School. He was trained in carpentry and joinery in Sunyani Technical and Tamale Technical Institutes. His calling into pastoral ministry in 1976 enabled him to acquire a master of theology in applied theology in 1998 and Doctor of Philosophy (PhD) in Theological Studies from University of Birmingham in 2002.

Onyinah was promoted to the academic rank of associate professor in 2016. In response to this promotion, a citation in honour written by the current general secretary of The Church of Pentecost, Apostle Alexander Nana Yaw Kumi-Larbi states: “It is with great honor and pleasure that we officially announce the promotion of the Chairman of The Church of Pentecost, Apostle Dr. Opoku Onyinah, to the academic rank of an Associate Professor.” – By Aps. Alexander N. Y. A.Kumi-Larbi"

== Employment and full-time ministry ==
Onyinah was employed by the State Construction Company as a regional estimator before his call into the full-time ministry of The Church of Pentecost in 1976.

His first ministerial station was a district overseer to Wa District from 1976 to 1981 in the Northern Region. Then transferred to Kumasi as district pastor from 1981 to 1984, He served as Ashanti regional head from 1984 to 1986, he left Ghana to London, UK, for further studies from 1986 to 1988. His return to Ghana saw him appointed as the Koforidua regional head from 1988 to 1991, he became the first international missions director for the church from 1991 to 1996, he continued theological studies at London-UK from 1996 to 2002, he was appointed principal to Pentecost Bible College, which subsequently upgraded to Pentecost University College as its first rector from 2002 to 2008 and finally as chairman of The Church of Pentecost-Worldwide from 2008 to 2018.

== Chairmanship ==
Onyinah was elected the chairman of The Church of Pentecost in 2008 succeeding Apostle Michael Ntumy. He secured approximately two-thirds of the votes cast. The chairmanship comes along with critical responsibilities. As a chairman, Apostle Onyinah performs the following functions:

- Chairs the executive council and the general council meetings
- Ex-officio member of every board and committee of the church
- Chairs every meeting, convention or rally he attends
- Directs action on issues and correspondence pertaining to missionaries and external branches
- Chairman of the Missions Board
- Assigns to the general secretary and the international missions director such duties as he deems necessary
- Responsible for appointing an acting general secretary or international missions director from among the executive council members, or apostles and prophets during the short absence of the general secretary or the international missions director not exceeding six months
- Takes decisions and actions with any area head where disciplinary or other action is urgently required in an area and afterwards reports to the executive council
- Organizes retreats, seminars, and prayer sessions for National/Area Heads and Ministers
- Issues pastoral and circular letters as and when he deems necessary
- Confers with the general secretary and the international missions director on matters concerning government and outside bodies
- Gives a formal address on the state of the church at every general council meeting

He was re-elected in the 40th general council meeting held at the Pentecost Convention Centre at Gomoa Fetteh in the Central Region. He obtained 77.3% of vote cast at the council meeting, which enabled him a five-year leadership mandate.

Onyinah also chairs the Ghana Pentecostal and Charismatic Council. He was deputized by Sam Korankye Ankrah. He is a member of the National Peace Council along with Prof. Emmanuel Asante and Bishop James Saah.

== Challenges ==
He claims to have faced some challenges in his ministry. Significant among them is a review of church culture concerning head covering and wearing of trousers by females in church services. This review was made by the church's college of apostles, prophets and evangelists in January 2010 and subsequently issued a communique to inform church members about the review. The review was not accepted by some of the members and the general public which resulted in strong criticism against his leadership.

Gibson Annor-Antwi, the co-author of the autobiography of Onyinah, believes that one of his strengths is the ability to handle difficult issues with absolute cordiality. He wrote that before the review of the said practices, the general secretary of the church, Apostle Dr. Alfred Koduah, was tasked to conduct an in-depth analysis of the issue. In an interview conducted by Gibson Annor-Antwi, Kodua said, "When on Tuesday 19 January 2010, I finished and presented the paper, it received a standing ovation".

Another member of the college, Apostle Peter Ayerakwah, proposed that a communique should be written to all assemblies hence, the 46-page document of F. Koduah was collapsed into two pages for circulation.

The communique was rejected by some members of the church, especially some elders from Beposo to Agona Ahanta in the Western Region as published in the Daily Guide Newspaper by Sam Mark Essien, Takoradi on 19 February 2010. Aftermath of this publication, was a strong agitation by members and officers who called the house of Prof. Opoku Onyinah with threats and anger.

According to Annor-Antwi, Opoku Onyinah led leadership and in spirit of love and explained the issues which eventually restored peaceful atmosphere in the church.

== Academic publications and books ==
- Onyinah Opoku "Principalities and Powers" in Wonsuk Ma, Veli-Matti Karkainen and J. Kwabena Asamoah Gyadu (eds.) Pentecost Mission and Global Christianity. Oxford: Regnum Books, 2014, pp. 139–168
- Healing: A Pentecostal perspective. One in Christ. Vol. 47.2. (2013), pp. 311–339
- Understanding Worship. Accra: Pentecost Press, 2013, p. 245
- Pentecostal and Exorcism. Blandford: Deo Publishing, 2012, p. 351
- Spiritual Warfare. Cleveland: CTP Publishing, 2012 p. 196
- Resting in the Lord. Accra: Pentecost Press, 2011, p. 137
- The Leading of the Spirit. Accra: Pentecost Press, 2011, p. 153
- No one may see God and live. Accra: Pentecost Press, 2010, p. 147
- Emmanuel, God with us. Accra: Advocate Publishing, 2007, p. 63
- Pentecostals and Charismatics. Accra: Pentecost Press, 2006, p. 66
- John's Head. Advocate Publishing, 2006, p. 69
- Pressure of Success. Accra: Rock Publicity, 2004, p. 29
- Are two persons the same?. How to overcome your weakness in temperament.Accra: Pentecost Press Ltd, 2004, p. 180
- Note on the Seven letters in Revelation. Accra: Pentecost Press Ltd, 2003, p. 49

== See also ==
- The Church of Pentecost
- Pentecost University College
- Ghana Peace Council
