= Nana Kwasi Boatey =

Nana Kwasi Boatey is the chief executive officer (CEO) at the Ghana Publishing Company. His appointment to the role was made by the president John Mahama. He is also the CEO of Orbitplus Pharmacy Limited.

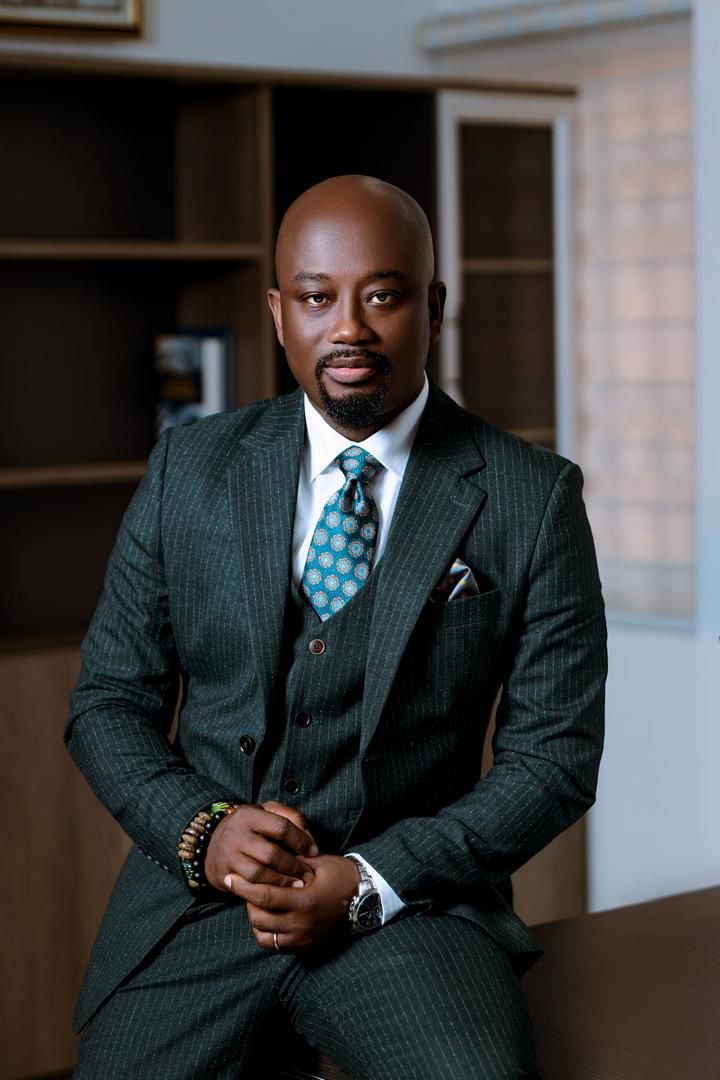
A picture of Nana Kwasi Boatey

== Early life and education ==
Nana Kwasi Boatey was born on 24th December,1978 in Adeiso, Eastern Region. He started his basic education at Awisa Presbyterian Primary School and his junior high school at Awisa Presbyterian Boarding School both located at Akyem Awisa.He attended Prempeh College,Kumasi where he completed his secondary education.He completed Kumasi Technical University in 2001, where he earned a Higher National Diploma (HND) in Pharmacy Technology.He also attended Kwame Nkrumah University of Science and Technology from 2005 to 2008 where he obtained his LLB(Law) degree.

== Career ==
Nana Kwasi Boatey was called to the Ghana Bar in 2011. His career spans law, media, and business. Before his appointment, he lectured on Civil Procedure at the Ghana School of Law in Kumasi and served as the Head of Chambers at Dadson and Associates Ltd., a law firm. He also worked in the media for over two decades hosting radio programmes including Decision 2020 on Luv FM and Action Point on Kapital Radio.Additionally, he is the CEO of Orbitplus Pharmacy Ltd.

== Political career ==
Nana Kwasi Boatey served as Parliamentary Liaison and Assistant to the former Minister of Trade and Industry, Hannah Tetteh from 2009 to 2011. He was also the board secretary to the Board of Directors of the Ghana Standards Authority. In February 2025, President John Dramani Mahama appointed Nana Kwasi Boatey as the acting Managing Director of the Ghana Publishing Company Limited, following the termination of the former Managing Director, Mr David Asante.
