= Peter Anim Newman =

Ghanaian evenagelical pastor

Aps. Peter Anim Newman
- Born: 4 February 1890; Boso, Eastern Region - Gold Coast
- Died: 7 February 1984 (aged 94)
- Education: Middle School Leaving
- Spouse: Madam Esther Anim
- Parent(s): Simon Apiagyei; Hannah Lartebea
- Religion: Christianity
- Congregations served: Christ Apostolic Church Ghana
- Offices held: Chairman
- Title: Founder

Apostle Peter Kwaku Mensah Newman Anim (also known as Kwaku Manasseh) was born on February 4, 1890, to Simon Appiagyei and Hannah Lartebea of Boso in the Volta Region of Ghana. He is credited as the originator of Classical Pentecostalism in Ghana. His intense interest in a magazine called The Sword of the Spirit, published through correspondence, with its editor, Pastor A. Clark, founder of the Faith Tabernacle Church, Philadelphia led him into receiving healing from a chronic stomach disorder and guinea worm infestation miraculously through prayer, a new experience from his Presbyterian upbringing. He therefore embraced the teachings of divine healing, having tested their efficacy by obtaining healing himself, he sought to inculcate this in a prayer group he formed in Asamankese. This group eventually, would become the pioneers of Ghana Classical Pentecostalism.

== Early life ==
Anim was the third of six children and he attended the Basel Mission school at Boso from Class 1 to Standard 3. He continued at Anum Basel Mission from Standard 4 to Standard 7, completing in 1908. He assisted his brother at Amonokrom (Akuapem) in a carpentry workshop in 1911. Later, he was employed at Pakro in the Basel Mission Factory as a weighing clerk. He was not successful with the job, due to ill health. After years of failing to find a befitting employment in Pakro, he finally returned his home town, in 1916 where he married Dora Sakyibea that same year in 1916. All the four daughters born to the young married couple died and eventually Dora herself also died in 1920. He married Esther Osimpo and out of that marriage was born a son, Moses Appiah Anim, the only surviving child of Anim. Madam Esther Anim also died in 1967

== Beginning ==
Apostle Anim's continuous misfortunes encouraged him to seek for a deeper reflection of God. He found the teachings from the Sword of Spirit magazine "a real blessing" as he is quoted, "though I had intellectually believed the Bible before, I never had the truth presented in a more realistic way...."

As a result, Anim started evangelistic activities throughout southern Ghana. He associated his ministry first, to Faith Tabernacle but later, due to immorality issues surrounding the leader of the Tabernacle Church he broke the connection with them and subscribed to the Apostolic Faith, Portland, Oregon. The outbreak of Pentecostal revival with the gift of speaking in tongues in Anim's church was exceptional. This led Anim and two leaders of his church to travel to Lagos where the Apostolic Church Bradford was having an affiliation with the Apostolic Church Nigeria. Anim subsequently affiliated with the Apostolic Church in 1935, and negotiated for a residential missionaries to be sent to Ghana.

== The birth of CAC GH ==
Anim's request for a resident missionary to Ghana was answered in 1937. Rev. James McKeown, arrived on March 4, 1937, as the first Pentecostal missionary from UK to Asamankese. McKeown's diligence attracted the admiration of all. Anim and his African membership have believed and practiced absolute divine healing, it was their practice to trust God for miraculous healing whenever a member fell sick. James Mckeown the white missionary contracted malaria and the trekking Kyebi District Commissioner, seeing the seriousness of his condition, sent him to the nearest European Hospital now the Ridge Hospital. After McKeown's recovery he returned immediately to Asamankese to continue his work. However, an intense disagreement arose between the members. Some of members felt betrayed by McKeown. The amicable option was that the young movement be split. McKeown heading the Apostolic Church of Gold Coast moved to Akroso and eventually Winneba while Peter Anim led his group under the name Christ Apostolic Church International.
