= Adeiso =

- Town
- Location of Adeiso in Eastern Region
- Coordinates: 5°47′34″N 0°29′19″W
- Country: Ghana
- Region: Eastern Region
- District: Upper West Akim

Government
  - Type: DCE- Assembly
- Elevation: 200 ft (60 m)

Population (2012)
  - Total: —
  - Ethnicity: Akan people
- Time zone: GMT
  - Summer (DST): GMT
- Ghana Post GPS: EV
- Area code: +233 34 31

Adeiso is capital of the Upper West Akim district of the Eastern Region of Ghana.

== Location ==
Adeiso is located just north of the southern border of the Eastern Region. Nsawam, capital of the Nsawam Adoagyire municipal district is located to the east. To the northwest is Asamankese, capital of the West Akim Municipal District and to the west are Akroso. To the southwest is Bawjiase in the Assin North District of the Central Region and to the south east, Amasaman, capital of the Ga West Municipal District in the Greater Accra Region.

== Transport ==
The Inter-Regional Highway 1 which runs from Mankessim in the Central Region, passes eastward through Adeiso where it intercepts the National Highway 6 at Nsawam before continuing further east to Aburi in the Eastern Region where it meets the National Highway 4 which runs north from Accra to Bunso.
