= Upper West Akim District =

- District
- Districts of Eastern Region

- Location of Upper West Akim District within Eastern
- Coordinates: 5°47′N 0°29′W
- Country: Ghana
- Region: Eastern
- Capital: Adeiso

Population (2021)
  - Total: 93,391
- Time zone: UTC+0 (GMT)

Upper West Akim District is one of the thirty-three districts in Eastern Region, Ghana. Originally it was formerly part of the then-larger West Akim District in 1988, which was created from the former West Akim District Council, which it was elevated to municipal district assembly status on 1 November 2007 (effectively 29 February 2008) to become West Akim Municipal District. However on 28 June 2012, the southern part of the district was split off to create Upper West Akim District; thus the remaining part has been retained as West Akim Municipal District. The district assembly is located in the southern part of Eastern Region and has Adeiso as its capital town. Hon Emmanuel Drah as the Mp for the Constituency and Hon Rebecca Chissah as the DCE.
