= Jacinta Ocansey =

Ghanaian comedian

Heiress Jacinta
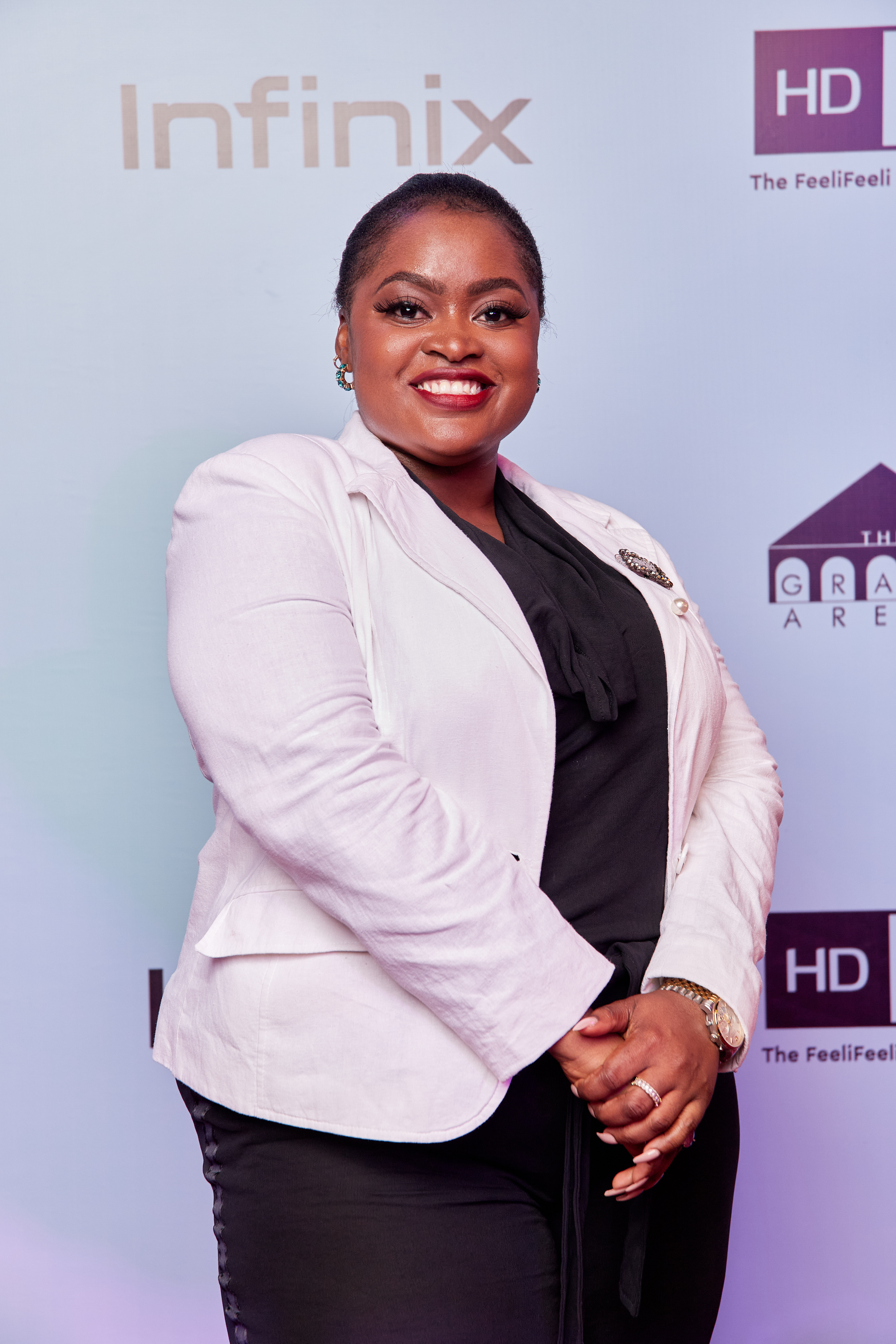
- Portrait of Heiress Jacinta
- Born: Jacinta Asi Ocansey; Nigeria
- Education: Pentecost University College
- Occupations: Stand-up Comedian, TV & Event personality, Actress, Singer
- Years active: 2015–present
- Known for: Comedy
- Awards: Ghana Tertiary awards, 2016

Jacinta Asi Ocansey is a Nigerian-Ghanaian stand-up comedian singer and actress. She has been called "Ghana's only comedienne" and the uncontested "Queen of Ghana comedy". Some of the awards she has won include; Ghana Tertiary Awards 2016 Most Influential Student Comedian, Most Popular Student and Most Entertaining Student.

== Early years and education ==
Ocansey was born in Nigeria to Alex Dzabaku Ocansey and Eucharia Ocansey as their only daughter. She had her primary education in Nigeria. After writing her West Africa Senior School Certificate Examination and doing a course at NIIT, she moved to Ghana for her tertiary education. In Ghana, she studied Mass Communication at the Pentecost University College.

== Career ==
She never dreamt of becoming a comedian but paying heed to her mother's advice to take comedy seriously is what led her to becoming a comedian. Some of her performances that led to her breakthrough include, her performance at a comedy club at Osu introduced to her by David Oscar and her performance at the 2015 Akwaaba UK Comedy Night at Movenpick Hotel. Again in 2016, with the help of Buchi, one of Nigeria's leading comedians, she performed at the Lord of the Ribs comedy show in Ghana.

She has performed in top Comedy Shows in Ghana and Nigeria. These include Comedy Night with Buchi (Lagos), Shakara and the Gang (Lagos), Comedy Express, Girltalk, Laughline, Live Comedy Thursdays, Lord of the Ribs, Easter Comedy Show, DKB Live, DKB Point of View, Akwaaba UK Comedy Night, Comedy Bar, Silverbird Comedy Night, Corporate Comedy Series, MMC Live among a host of others.

She works as a Master of Ceremony, actress and singer. She has starred in Yvonne Nelson's Heels and Sneakers and Selfie, an upcoming movie. She has a single, Gyrate featuring Ethel Eshun.

== Personal life ==
She is a Christian.
