= Eric Nyamekye =

Ghanaian Pentecostal televangelist

- Born: Eric Kwabena Nyamekye; Asokore, Ashanti Region
- Education: Theology
- Parent(s): Agnes Owusu and Stephen Antiedu Nyamekye

Ecclesiastical career
- Religion: Christianity
- Church: The Church of Pentecost
- Offices held: Chairman
- Title: Apostle

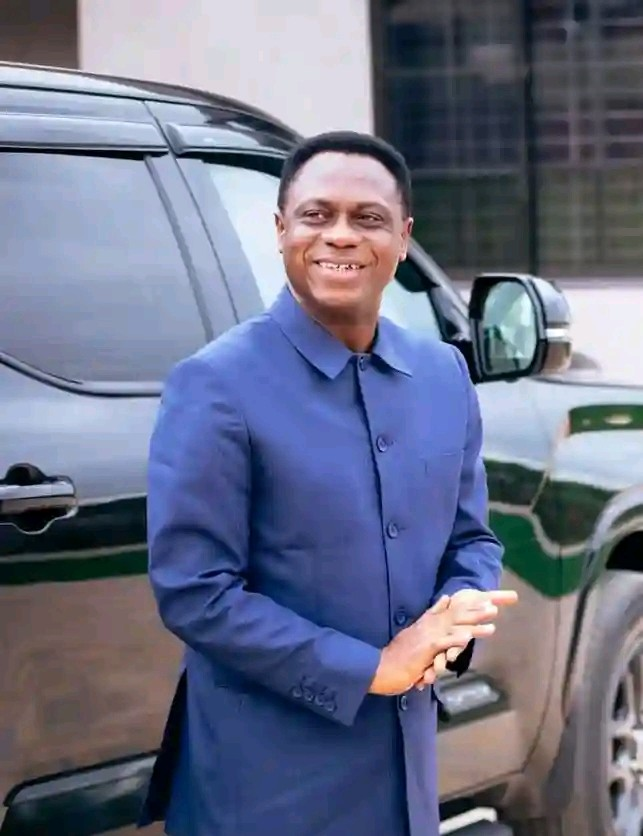
Apostle Eric Nyamekye. The 6th Chairman Of the Church of Pentecost

Eric Kwabena Nyamekye is a Ghanaian Pentecostal televangelist, an apostle and the 6th Chairman of The Church of Pentecost (COP), Nationwide, the largest Pentecostal denomination in West Africa. He is the President of the Ghana Pentecostal and Charismatic Council( GPCC) and the Chancellor of the Pentecost University. He holds a diploma in Human Resource Management from the Institute of Commercial Management, UK, a postgraduate diploma in Applied Theology from the University of Manchester, UK, and a master of Arts degree in Religious Studies from the University of Ghana, Legon. He is married to Mary Nyamekye.

== Early life and education ==
Nyamekye was born to Stephen Antiedu Nyamekye and Agnes Owusu in Asokore.

After completing Tema Secondary School in 1983, he went to Nyankpala Agricultural College in the Northern Region, where he obtained a certificate in General Agriculture in 1986. He also holds a diploma in Human Resource Management from the Institute of Commercial Management, UK, a post-graduate diploma in Applied Theology from the University of Manchester, UK and a Master of Arts Degree in Religious Studies from the University of Ghana, Legon

== Employment and full-time ministry ==
He worked for three years with the Technology Consultancy Centre, KNUST, before he going into full-time ministry in the Church of Pentecost in 1991. His first ministry station was Daboase District in the Western Region between 1991 and 1995, then to Agona Nsaba in the Central Region to serve until 1999 where he was ordained as a pastor in 1996.

He was sent on missions to the Republic of South Africa, from 1999 till 2005, when he was recalled back to Ghana and stationed at East Legon, where he served as a district pastor until 2008. Until 2011, he was the resident minister of the Atomic branch of the Pentecost International Worship Centre. He was later called into the Office of Apostle and transferred to Tamale as area head from 2011 to 2015. Eastern Region - Koforidua Area Head from 2015-2018. In May 2018 at the 43rd General Council Meeting of the Church of Pentecost, he was elected the 6th Chairman of the Church of Pentecost.

The Church of Pentecost on May 4, 2023 re-elected Nyamekye to serve as its Chairman for the next five years.
