= Hans Werner Debrunner =

Swiss German theologian and historian

The Rev. Dr. Hans Werner Debrunner
- Born: 1923; Bern, Switzerland
- Died: 1998 (aged 74–75)
- Occupations: Historian; Minister; Theologian
- Writing career
- Language: English; German

Hans Werner Debrunner (1923 –1998) was a Swiss German historian, Protestant theologian and ethnologist whose work mainly covered mission history, West Africa and the African diaspora. Born in Bern, Switzerland, he also carried out academic research on history relating to missiology in northern, eastern and southern Africa. Upon his death in 1998, his private library and archive were donated to the Carl Schlettwein Foundation. The "independent, self-contained collection" comprises more than 3100 books and single journal issues on his area of specialty, published mostly in the first half to mid-twentieth century. Furthermore, Debrunner’s academic archives are a compilation of historiography and ethnography, particularly bio-bibliographies of Swiss missionaries and native African pastors and missionaries who worked with the Basel Mission in Africa. Debrunner also documented history, socio-political and intercultural relations between Africa and Europe. Hans Debrunner’s accounts explored the life and works of African saints, royalty, aristocrats, noblemen, political envoys, writers, intellectuals, scholars and artists who lived in or visited Europe from the early medieval period through the Enlightenment until the end of the World War I era.

== Selected works ==
- “Anfaenge Evangelischer Missionarbeit auf der Goldküste bis 1828,” Evangelisches Missions Magazin, Basel (1954).
- "Friedrich Pedersen Svane, 1710-1789." Evangelisches Missions-Magazin 101 (1957): 24-35
- "Witchcraft in Ghana: A Study on the Belief in Destructive Witches and Its Effect on the Akan Tribes" Accra: Presbyterian Book Depot (1961)
- "Pioneers of church and education in Ghana : Danish chaplains to Guinea, 1661-1850" (1962) In Kirkehistoriske Samlinger 7:4, edited by Niels Knud Andersen and Knud Banning, 373-425. Copenhagen: G. E. C. Gads Forlani, 1960-62
- "A Church between Colonial Powers: A Study of the Church in Togo" World studies of churches in mission Lutterworth Press (1965)
- "Owura Nico, the Rev. Nicholas Timothy Clerk, 1862-1961: pioneer and church leader" (translated by Susanne Mainzer) Pioneer series Accra: Waterville Pub. House (1965)
- "The story of Sampson Opong" Pioneer series Accra: Waterville Pub. House (1965)
- "A history of Christianity in Ghana," Accra: Waterville Pub. House (1967)
- "Mitteilungen der Basler Afrika Bibliographien, Volume 22" Basel: Basler Afrika Bibliographien (1979)
- "Presence and Prestige - Africans in Europe: A History of Africans in Europe before 1918," Communications from the Basel Africa Bibliography Volume 22, Basler Afrika Bibliographien (1979)
- "Pride and Prejudice," Basler Afrika Bibliographien (1979)
- "Afrikaliteratur in Basler Bibliotheken: Bibliothek und Dokumentation COOP Schweiz" Basel: Basler Afrika Bibliographien (1982)
- (contrib.) Trappe Paul "Entwicklungssoziologie" Basel: Social Strategies Publishers Cooperative (1984)
- "Schweizer im kolonialen Afrika" Volume 9 of Beiträge zur Afrikakunde, Basler Afrika Bibliographien (1991)
- "Grégoire l'Européen: Henri Grégoire 1750-1831; kontinentale Beziehungen eines französischen Patrioten" Anif/Salzburg: Müller-Speiser (1997)
