= Nana Akosua Konadu =

Ghanaian television personality

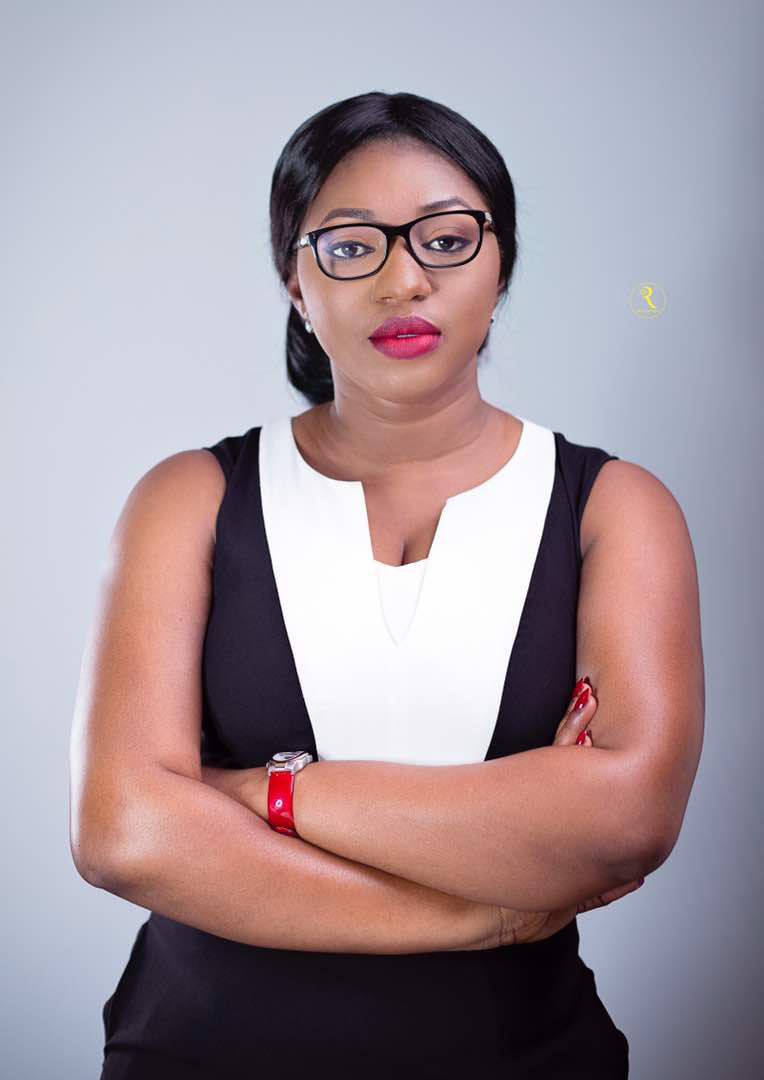
- Nana Akosua Konadu
- Born: Accra, Ghana
- Education: Pentecost University
- Occupations: CEO of Enak Consult; Television producer and host
- Known for: The Hard Truth

Eunice Nana Akosua Konadu, also known as Nana Akosua Konadu, is a Ghanaian broadcaster and the CEO and founder of Enak Consult. She is the host of the talk show The Hard Truth.

== Education ==
Konadu attended Yaa Asantewaa Girls' Senior High School for secondary education. Afterwards, she attended Pentecost University in Ghana between 2006 and 2010, where she studied human resource management.

== Career ==
After completing her university education, Konadu did her one-year mandatory National Service at the National Disaster Management Organization (NADMO) as a human resource officer. Afterwards, she became the producer and host of The Hard Truth, a Ghanaian current events talk show, and the co-host of the AM Show. She is also the CEO of Enak Studios, an events and production management company.

== Personal life ==
Konadu married Manuel Asante-Samuels on 14 May 2016 at the Pentecost International Worship Centre Kokomlemle.
