= William Wadé Harris =

Liberian missionary (c. 1860–1929)

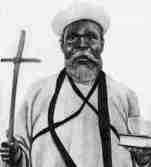
- William Wadé Harris dressed in a white robe and turban, carrying a Bible and bamboo cross.
- Born: 1860; Graway Village, Liberia
- Died: 1929 (aged 68–69)
- Occupation: Religious preacher
- Known for: Prophet-Evangelist of West Africa
- Spouse: Rose Badik Farr
- Children: 6

William Wadé Harris (c. 1860 – 1929) was a Liberian Grebo evangelist, who preached in Liberia, Côte d'Ivoire and Ghana. He has been described as the "most extraordinary one man evangelical crusade that Africa has ever known" and is considered one of the originators of today's prosperity gospel.

== Early life ==
Harris was born in 1860 as a Kru man of the Grebo tribe in Liberia. He was born to a "heathen father", at a time when the heathens and Christians lived in separate parts of the village. His mother lived as a Christian in the midst of a family life that was associated with traditional sacrifices and witch doctoring.

When Harris was 12, he served as a ward to Rev. Jesse Lowrie of the Methodist Episcopal Mission. Through him, Harris learnt how to read and write in both Grebo and English. Harris converted to Christianity in 1881 or 1882 when he was baptised by Rev. Lowrie.

After Lowrie went to Cape Palmas, Harris became a (Kru-boy) crew boy on board ships which sailed on the coast of West Africa. After he returned as a crew boy on ships and settled back home as a brick mason, he married Rose Badick Farr and had six children.

In 1892, Harris left Methodism and joined the American Episcopal Mission as a school teacher and catechist.

== Religious career ==
In 1910 he was arrested for his part in an insurrection, and he later indicated that while in prison he received a vision of the angel Gabriel. On July 27, 1913, Harris began on a missionary journey from Liberia to Ghana, clad in a white robe and a turban. He carried a bamboo cross, a Bible and a gourd rattle, symbolizing the African nature of his mission. Harris identified himself with the biblical prophet Elijah.

Harris preached an orthodox Christian message, with an emphasis on dealing with indigenous fetishes. He burned the objects and called on his hearers to spurn occult practices. He approved of polygamy, and traveled in the company of several wives. In an eighteen-month period in 1913–1914, Harris baptized over 100,000 new converts.

He went on three more missionary journeys thereafter (1917-1918, 1919, and 1921), which he travelled from Liberia to Sierra Leone and back.

Among those converted by Harris was Maame Harris Tani, who would go on to become his third wife and, later, to lead the Twelve Apostles Church of Ghana.

== Death and legacy ==
Harris died in 1929 in extreme poverty. His preaching produced hundreds of "Harris" churches along the Ivory Coast, although many of his followers joined established denominations, both Catholic and Protestant. Jones Darkwa Amanor suggests that he can "be considered as the precursor of the Pentecostal Movement in Ghana," while Mark Noll notes that his form of Christianity was "not as thoroughly indigenized as the Zionist movements of South Africa."

David Shank argues that Harris's work "brought about a massive break with the external practices of traditional African religions all along the coast," including the disappearance of lascivious dance, huts for isolating women during their menstrual periods and a variety of taboos about days and places.

Harris is also considered by many to be one of the originators of today's prosperity gospel.

== See also ==
- Religion in Côte d'Ivoire
