= Pentecost Convention Centre =

Pentecost Convention Centre (PCC)
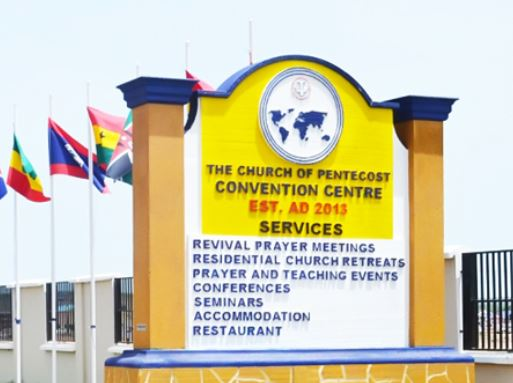
- Concrete Signage located at Pentecost Convention Centre
- Location: Gomoa Fetteh, Central Region, Ghana
- Address: Millennium City, Gomoa Fetteh Near Kasoa
- Opened: October 2013
- Manager: Pastor Prince Odoom
- Owner: The Church of Pentecost
- Parking: Free parking
- Website: www.pcc-global.org

Pentecost Convention Centre (PCC) is located on 250 square acres of land at Gomoa Fetteh in the Central Region of Ghana. Inaugurated in May 2013 with ultra-modern buildings, it is designed to hold conventions for individuals and groups who wish to promote and share common interests. The centre offers sufficient auditoriums, conference centres, accommodation and a floor area to accommodate several thousand attendees. The venue is suitable for major camp meetings, church general meetings and trade exhibition. PCC has four auditoriums with 5,000, 3,000, 500 and 200 seating capacities respectively. It also contains 50 to 100 seating capacity conference rooms, range of executive, standard and economy accommodations and a 3000 seater restaurant.

== Inauguration ==
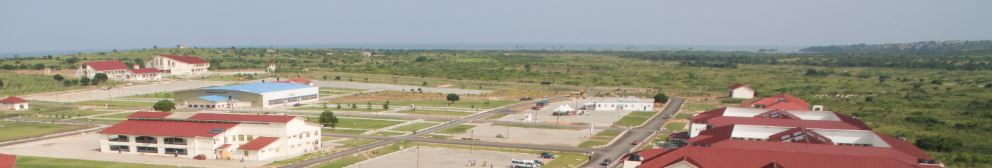
Aerial view, November 2016

The centre was inaugurated by President John Dramani Mahama during the 40th General Council Meeting of the Church of Pentecost in May 2013. The event under the theme "Worshipping in Spirit and in Truth" briefed the public on how the land was acquired for such a centre. The owners of the centre claim the Christian conference centre hosted both public and Christian activities with over five hundred thousand guests within its two years of operation.

The PCC since its inauguration has also become a place associated with famous Ghanaian political visits. President Nana Akuffo Addo paid visit when he was a candidate in January, 2016. He pledged that he would ensure that not a "single Ghanaian blood" will be shared for his electoral fortune. He delivered his first ever presidential address to a Christian gathering at the same place exactly one year later.

== List of buildings ==
- Joseph Egyir-Paintsil Auditorium - 5000 seater auditorium
- Fred Diabene Walker Auditorium - 3000 seater auditorium
- J Cofie Quaye - 500 seater auditorium
- Samuel William Duffour Auditorium - 200 seater auditorium
- Executive conference room – 60 seater
- 120 seater conference room
- 100 seater conference room
- 60 seater conference room
- Two 50 seater conference rooms
- Executive restaurant
- Executive suite
- Standard suite
- Economy rooms
- Clinic
- Bank
- Spacious car park
- Serene ecosystem
- Kohinta Prayer Centre
- Pentecost Theological Seminary
- Security post staffed by Ghana Police Service personnel

== See also ==
- List of convention and exhibition centers
