= West Akim Municipal District =

- Municipal District
- Seal

- Districts of Eastern Region

- Location of West Akim Municipal District within Eastern
- Coordinates: 5°51′36″N 0°39′58″W
- Country: Ghana
- Region: Eastern
- Capital: Asamankese

Government
  - Municipal Chief Executive: Kwabena Sintim Aboagye

Area
  - Total: 825 km^{2} (319 sq mi)

Population (2021)
  - Total: 120,145
- Time zone: UTC+0 (GMT)

West Akim Municipal District is one of the thirty-three districts in Eastern Region, Ghana. Originally created as an ordinary district assembly in 1988 when it was known as West Akim District, which was created from the former West Akim District Council. Later, it was elevated to municipal district assembly status on 1 November 2007 (effectively 29 February 2008) to become West Akim Municipal District. However on 28 June 2012, the southern part of the district was split off to create Upper West Akim District; thus the remaining part has been retained as West Akim Municipal District. The current MP for West Akim Municipal District is Hon. Charles Acheampong. The municipal is located in the southern part of Eastern Region and has Asamankese as its capital town. Baffour Abodie Sarkodie Appiah I is the Mawerehene of Asamankese known in private life as Dr. Alex Kwame Appiah; he doubles as the president and CEO of Gewah Hospital Ltd and Gewah Groups of Companies who is also a member of United Nations Economic and Social Council Civil Society (ECOSOC).

== Economic boost ==
1. Farming
2. Trading

== List of settlements ==
Settlements of West Akim Municipal District
No.	Settlement	Population	Population year
1	Asamankese	39,435	2013

Asamankese has the largest municipal under Abuakwa Traditional Council and Osaberima Adu Darko lll is Asamankesehene.

== Sources ==
- "West Akim Municipal District". Statoids.
- Districts: West Akim Municipal District
