= Maame Harris Tani =

Maame Harris Tani, sometimes known as "Grace" (c. 1870s/1880s – 1958) was a Ghanaian religious figure.

Born in the town of Krisan in the Western Region of what would become Ghana, Tani was a member of the Nzema people. She gained a reputation as a healer and herbalist early in life. In 1914 she became the first person converted by William Wadé Harris, whose third wife she became. She developed a talent for spirit possession, and with Papa Kwesi John Nackabah became a leader in the Twelve Apostles Church of Ghana when Harris returned to Ivory Coast. The church remains popular today; central to its existence is the healing ritual known as sunsum edwuma, or "spiritual work", performed with water in basins and developed by Maame Tani in the 1920s.
