= Bible Society of Ghana =

The Bible Society of Ghana is a non-denominational, non-governmental Christian organization based in Ghana. The organization is registered under the Trustees Act, 1962 of the Republic of Ghana. It is the largest Bible distribution organization in Ghana.

== History ==
In the late 1950s and early 1960s Rev. Prof. Baeta, Mr. A. L. Quansah and Mr. E. S. Aidoo discussed and established a national Society with others. The Society opened it head office, The Bible House, on 18 September 1965. Full operation as a national Bible Society started in 1966 and it became a full member of the United Bible Societies in 1968.

== Purpose ==
The organization translates, publishes and distributes Bibles at affordable prices (comes with high subsidies) and promotes its use to transform lives. The organisation has a vision of reaching every home in Ghana with the word of God in a language they understand.

== Collaborations ==
BSG along with Ghana Institute of Linguistics, Literacy and Bible Translation and the United Bible Societies (UBS) form the three main organisations involved in Bible translation in Ghana.
