= Pentecost University =

Ghanaian Private University

- Motto: Transformation And Service
- Type: Private
- Established: March 2003; 23 years ago
- Chairperson: Elizabeth Ankumah
- Chancellor: Apostle Eric Nyamekye
- Vice-Chancellor: Rev. Prof. Kwabena Agyapong-Kodua
- Location: Sowutuom, Greater Accra Region, Ghana
- Campus: Suburban Area
- Website: pentvars.edu.gh

Pentecost University is a private university located at Sowutuom, in the Greater Accra Region of Ghana. It was founded by The Church of Pentecost (COP) and evolved from the Pentecost Bible College, which initially trained only Lay Leaders and full-time Ministers for the COP. On May 22, 2003, former President of Ghana J. A. Kufuor officially inaugurated PUC at the Sowutuom campus. The first PUC Council was inducted on May 6, 2004. Pentecost University received accreditation from the National Accreditation Board (NAB) of Ghana in November 2004 and awarded its Presidential Charter on May 28, 2020, by Nana Addo Dankwa Akufo-Addo, then President of the Republic of Ghana. Prior to receiving a Presidential Charter, the university was affiliated to the Kwame Nkrumah University of Science and Technology, University of Cape Coast, and University of Ghana. On June 1, 2020, the university announced the appointment of Rev. Prof. Kwabena Agyapong-Kodua, who replaces Apostle Daniel Okyere Walker, as the first Vice-Chancellor since the university became fully-fledged.

The student population is about 3000, made up of students enrolled in degree, certificate and professional programmes.

The main campus of Pentecost University is sited at Sowutuom, away from Accra. Sowutuom (which literally translates “hold your gun”) is within the western parts of Accra, a quiet and serene area off the Kwashieman-Ofankor highway.

== Faculties ==
Currently, the university has four Faculties namely, Faculty of Engineering, Science and Computing (FESAC), Faculty of Business Administration (FBA), Pentecost School of Theology and Mission (PSTM) and Faculty of Health and Allied Sciences (FHAS). It also has to its credit the Pentecost University Graduate School (PUGS) and the College of Foundation and Professional Studies (COFOPS) for a detailed list of all degree, certificate and professional programmes).

== Professional programmes ==
The university also runs professional programmes designed to keep students up to the latest trends in their respective work environment.

Foundation and professional programmes under the COFOPS include:

- Association of Business Executives (ABE)
- National Computing Centre Education (NCC Education)
- Chartered Institute of Marketing (CIM UK)
- Certificate in Theology & Church Administration
- Certificate in Alternative Conflict Resolution
- Certificate in Business Administration
- Certificate in Leadership and Governance in Health Systems Management
- Certificate in Holistic Early Child Care Development
- Chartered Institute of Logistics and Transport (CILT)
- BCS Approved Centre (Professional IT Training)
- Institute of Chartered Accountants Ghana (ICAG)

== Affiliations ==
Pentvars holds established agreements with several internationally recognised bodies and Universities for Faculty, student and staff exchange, potential funding as well as collaborative research. These bodies include Saginaw Valley State University, USA; London South Bank University, Bucks New University, University of Salford and NCC Education, all in the UK. Pentvars is also a member of the following Associations: Association of African Universities, Council for Advancement and Support of Education (CASE), USA, and Council of Independent Universities, Ghana.

== Partnerships ==
On 15th April 2026, Pentecost University signed a Memorandum of Understanding (MoU) with the Ghana Prisons Service to strengthen rehabilitation and capacity-building programmes for inmates in Ghana.

== Notable alumni ==
- Kweku Frimpong, Ghanaian oil and insurance businessman
- Nana Akosua Konadu, CEO and television host
- Joe Mettle, award-winning Ghanaian gospel musician
- Jacinta Ocansey, female stand-up comedian

== See also ==
- List of universities in Ghana
