= The Church of Pentecost =

Christian Pentecostal denomination from Ghana

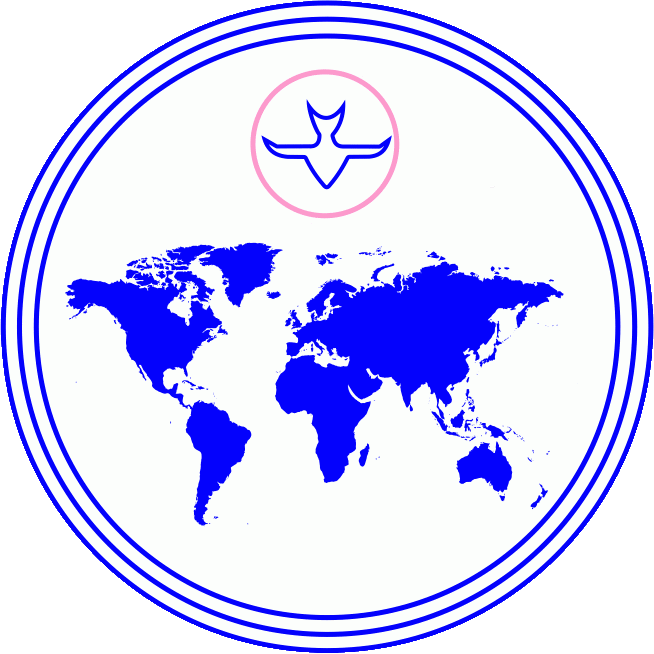
- Classification: Evangelical Christianity
- Theology: Pentecostal
- Governance: Presbytery
- Chairman: Apostle Eric Nyamekye
- Region: Worldwide
- Headquarters: Accra
- Founder: Ps. James McKeown
- Origin: 21 May 1953; Asamankese, Ghana
- Congregations: Over 28,000
- Members: Over 5,200,000
- Official website: thecophq.org

The Church of Pentecost is a Pentecostal denomination that originates from Ghana. The Church currently has a presence in 213 countries and territories globally. Its current Chairman, who happens to be its highest officer worldwide, is Apostle Eric Nyamekye.

== History ==
The church has its origins in a British mission of Rev. James McKeown in Ghana in 1937. In 1953, The Church was founded as Gold Coast Apostolistic Church. Upon the country's attainment of independence in 1957, the name changed to the Ghana Apostolic Church. In resolution of a conflict with the Apostolic Church, Ghana, the then President of Ghana, Dr. Kwame Nkrumah ruled that the church adopted a new name, thus, in August 1962, the name Church of Pentecost came into being. Through foreign missionary work and establishing relationships with other Pentecostal churches, the Church of Pentecost expanded into a worldwide movement. The Church of Pentecost operated in 151 Nations headed by Apostles, Prophets, Evangelists and Senior Pastors throughout the world and about 21,802 local assemblies in 2,898 districts. In 2025, global membership of the Church stood at 5,226,271 with children constituting about 1,568,011. The Church of Pentecost had 178,223 church officers (lay leaders) and 3,723 ordained ministers in 213 nations and territories. The Church saw an increase of 8.3% with regards to the total membership of the church and now operate in 213 nations and territories across the globe.

== Church leadership ==
=== Chairmen of the Church of Pentecost ===
- Pastor James McKeown 1953–1982
- Apostle Fred Stephen Safo 1982–1987
- Prophet Martinson Kwadwo Yeboah 1988–1998
- Apostle Dr. Michael Kwabena Ntumy 1998–2008
- Apostle Prof. Opoku Onyinah 2008–2018
- Apostle Eric Nyamekye 2018–present

The Church of Pentecost re-elected Nyamekye as chairman of the church during an election held on May 4, 2023 at the Pentecost Convention Center at Gomoa Fetteh as part of the 46th General Council Meeting.

== Past General Secretaries ==
The Church of Pentecost has had several General Secretaries since 1962.

Apostle Joseph Egyir Paintsil	1962–1982
Apostle Daniel K. Arnan	1982–1988
Apostle Rigwell Ato Addison	1988–1993
Apostle Albert Amoah	1993–2003
Apostle Dr. Alfred Koduah Ntumy	2003–2013
Apostle Alexander Nana Yaw Kumi	2013–2023
Apostle Samuel Gyau Obuobi	2023–Present

== Past International Mission Director ==
Apostle Opoku Onyinah	1992-1996
Apostle Benjamin Kofi Arthur	1996-2001
Apostle Dr. Stephen Kofi Baidoo	2001-2011
Apostle Emmanuel Gyesi-Addo	2011-2021
Apostle Emmanuel Agyemang Bekoe	2021-Present

== See also ==
- World Evangelical Alliance
- Believers' Church

== Bibliography ==
- An Introduction to Pentecostalism: Global Charismatic Christianity – Allen Anderson – ISBN 0521532809
- Religions of the World, Second Edition – J. Gordon Melton, Martin Baumann -ISBN 1598842048
