= James McKeown (missionary) =

Irish missionary

- Born: James Mckeown; 12 September 1900; Glenborg, Scotland
- Died: 4 May 1989 (aged 88); Ballymena, Ireland
- Spouse: Sophia Mckeown
- Parent(s): William John McKeown; Elizabeth Thompson
- Religion: Christianity
- Church: The Church of Pentecost
- Offices held: Founder & First Chairman, The Church of Pentecost
- Title: Pastor

Pastor James McKeown (12 September 1900 – 4 May 1989) was an Irish missionary who spent considerable time in the Gold Coast, now Ghana. He was the first Pentecostal missionary to come to Ghana from the United Kingdom and was instrumental in the establishment of The Apostolic Church - Ghana. In the 1950s he founded the Church of Pentecost, the church with the biggest denomination in Ghana and which has branches all over the world. He is considered a "pioneer of Ghanaian Pentecostalism".

== Missionary work ==
James McKeown arrived in the Gold Coast on 4 March 1937 to begin missionary work as the resident missionary of the Apostolic Church of Bradford after having left the United Kingdom for the then Gold Coast on a boat in February 1937. He had delayed the decision to become a missionary for 15 months after a prophecy had been made that he would go to West Africa on Missionary duty. He had initially refused to become a missionary owing chiefly to his inadequate formal training. He settled in Asamankese and begun his missionary work there. His wife Sophia joined him in the Gold Coast in September 1937.

After he had been able to establish the Apostolic Church in the Gold Coast, McKeown fell out with the native Church leaders for having been taken to the Ridge Hospital Accra in Accra for medical attention. In 1953 another crisis arose which saw a large section of the Apostolic Church following Pastor McKeown to form the Gold Coast Apostolic Church. This eventually culminated in the founding of the Church of Pentecost after Ghana's first President Dr. Kwame Nkrumah advised for a change of name so as to settle disputes that arose as a result of its break away., In early 1982, Mckeown handed over leadership of the Church to a Ghanaian, Rev. Fred. S. Sarfo, and inducted him into office in October 1982 after which he left Ghana. He paid his last visit to the West African country in 1984.

== Death ==
His wife Sophia died on 27 January 1983. James McKeown died on 4 May 1989, at his home in Ballymena, in Northern Ireland.
