= Asamankese =

- Town
- West Akim Municipal District logo

- Location of Asamankese in Eastern Region, Ghana
- Coordinates: 5°52′N 0°49′W
- Country: Ghana
- Region: Eastern Region
- District: West Akim Municipal

Population (2013)
  - Total: 39,435
- Time zone: GMT
  - Summer (DST): GMT

Asamankese is a town in south Ghana and is the capital of West Akim Municipal District, a district in the Eastern Region of south Ghana. Asamankese has a 2013 settlement population of approximately 39,435 people. Asamankese is on the main highway to Kumasi and Accra in the interior. The people of Asamankese celebrate the Obuodwan festival.

== History ==
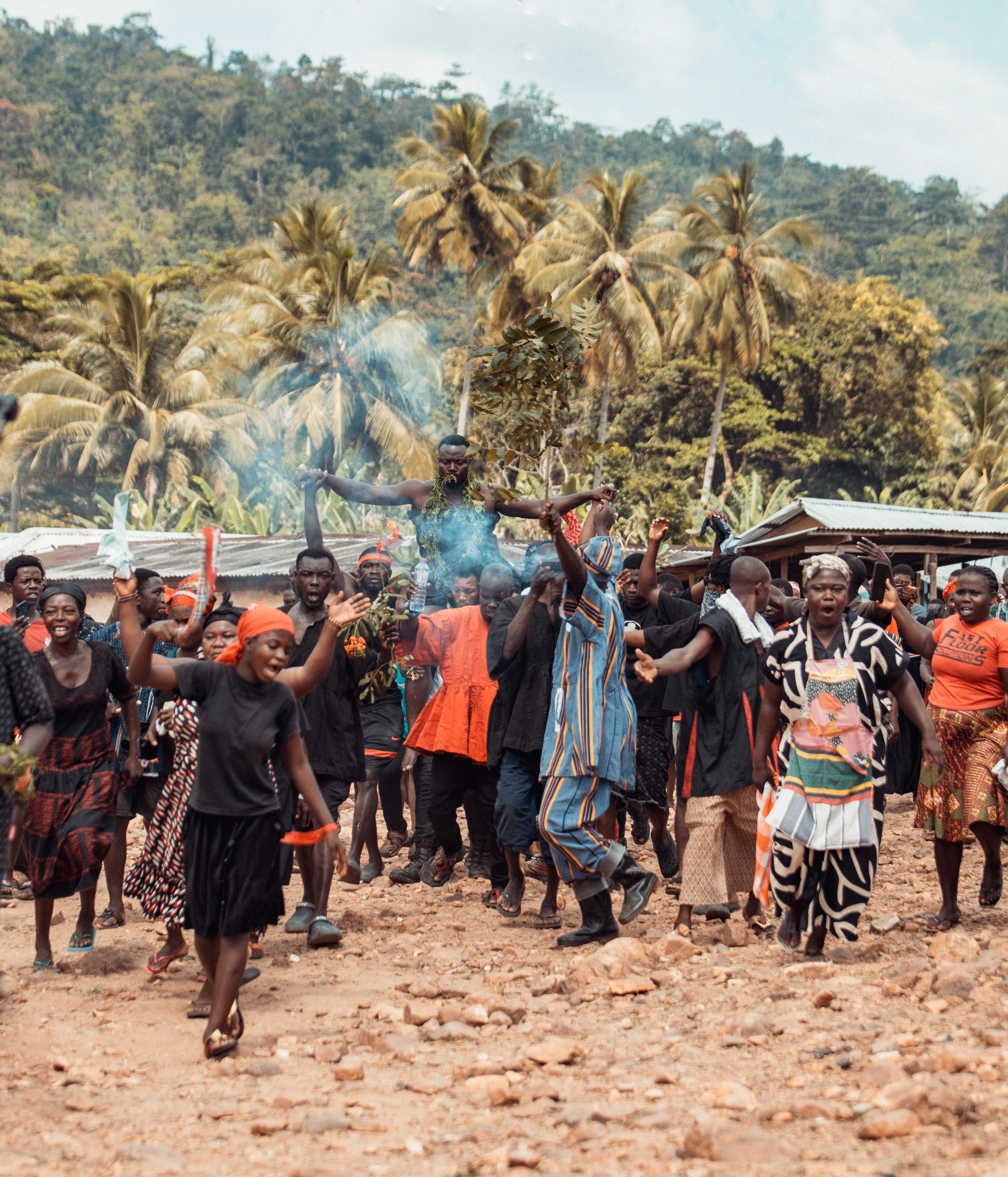
Chieftaincy enstoolment rite

The modern city of Asamankese was founded and occupied by the Akwamu. The Akwamus moved south and eastward from Dormaa around the 14th century to Twifo-Heman, North West Cape Coast. The move was commercially motivated and settled at the Twifo-Heman forest in the later part of the 16th century. Akwamus are Akans, and belonged to the Aduana family who are blood brothers of Asumennya, Dormaa and Kumawu. According to oral tradition, a succession dispute resulted in Otomfuo (brass-smith) Asare leaving to form a new state around a city called Asaremankesee (Asare's big state), now known as Asamankese. The capital of Akwamu later moved to Nyaonase.

Other settlers from Juaben in Ashanti settled at Asamankese. During the reign of Nana Dokua [as both okyehene (king) and ohemaa (queenmother)] of Akyem, a section of the Juabens of Ashanti revolted against the Golden Stool of Ashanti. The rebels, led by their chief, Nana Kwaku Boateng, were forced to leave Juaben in Ashanti for the south. They found settlement at Kyebi, Kwabeng, Tafo, Asamankese and other parts of Akyem Abuakwa. As at 2023, the chief of Asamankese was Osabarima Adu Darko III.

== Education ==
In 1963, the natives of Asamankese founded a public mixed secondary school called Asamankese Senior High School (a.k.a. ASASCO).
