= Deaths in January 2013 =

The following is a list of notable deaths in January 2013.

Entries for each day are listed alphabetically by surname. A typical entry lists information in the following sequence:

- Name, age, country of citizenship and reason for notability, established cause of death, reference.

== January 2013 ==
=== 1 ===
- Moses Anderson, 84, American Roman Catholic prelate, Auxiliary Bishop of Detroit (1983–2003), cardiac arrest.
- Lory Blanchard, 88, New Zealand rugby league player and coach.
- Robert J. Callahan, 82, American jurist, Chief Justice of the Connecticut Supreme Court (1996–1999), Parkinson's disease.
- Michael Patrick Cronan, 61, American graphic designer and artist, named TiVo, Amazon Kindle, colon cancer.
- Jack Davis, 80, American football player (Boston Patriots).
- Ross Davis, 94, American Negro league baseball player.
- Lucio Dell'Angelo, 74, Italian footballer.
- Paul du Feu, 77, Welsh painter, builder, cartoonist and model.
- Lloyd Hartman Elliott, 94, American educator, President of George Washington University (1965–1988).
- Avrohom Yaakov Friedman, 84, Austrian–born Israeli rabbi.
- Hugh Gillis, 94, American politician, member of the Georgia House of Representatives (1950–1962) and Senate (1962–2004).
- Allan Hancox, 80, British-born Kenyan justice, Chief Justice (1989–1993).
- Roz Howard, 91, American racing driver.
- Christopher Martin-Jenkins, 67, British cricket journalist (Test Match Special, The Cricketer) and BBC radio commentator, cancer.
- Alois Moser, 82, Canadian Olympic ski jumper (1960).
- Louis J. Nigro Jr., 65, American diplomat, cancer.
- Patti Page, 85, American singer ("Tennessee Waltz", "Confess") and actress (Elmer Gantry), heart and lung disease.
- Slobodan Rakitić, 72, Serbian writer and politician.
- Mojtaba Tehrani, 79, Iranian Twelver Marja'.
- Brihaspati Dev Triguna, 92, Indian traditional healer.
- Barbara Werle, 84, American actress (Battle of the Bulge, Charro!, The Virginian).
- Phyllis Wiener, 91, American artist.
- Zhang Wenbin, 93, Chinese politician, Vice Minister of the Petroleum Industry (1965–1987).
- Wendell Young III, 76, American labor leader, Liver cancer

=== 2 ===
- Yuri Alexandrov, 49, Russian boxer, heart attack.
- Charles W. Blackwell, 70, American Chickasaw Nation diplomat, Ambassador to the United States (since 1995).
- Wren Blair, 87, Canadian ice hockey coach and manager (Minnesota North Stars, Pittsburgh Penguins).
- Beatrice Bolam, 93, English politician and magistrate.
- Jim Boyd, 79, American actor (The Electric Company).
- Margaret A. Brewer, 82, American USMC brigadier general.
- Council Cargle, 77, American stage and film actor (Jackie Brown, Detroit 9000).
- Karel Čáslavský, 75, Czech film historian and television host, pneumonia.
- Charles Chilton, 95, British BBC Radio writer, producer and presenter (Journey into Space), pneumonia.
- Angelo Coia, 74, American football player (Chicago Bears, Washington Redskins, Atlanta Falcons).
- John Commins, 71, South African cricketer.
- Lee Eilbracht, 88, American baseball coach (University of Illinois) (1952–1978).
- Zaharira Harifai, 83, Israeli actress, cancer.
- Merv Hunter, 86, Australian politician, New South Wales MLA for Lake Macquarie (1969–1991).
- Géza Koroknay, 64, Hungarian actor.
- Gerda Lerner, 92, Austrian-born American feminist historian.
- Ladislao Mazurkiewicz, 67, Uruguayan footballer, respiratory illness.
- Joe McGrath, Irish Gaelic football and hurling coach (Cork).
- Ian McKeever, 42, Irish mountaineer and Seven Summits record holder, lightning strike.
- Maulvi Nazir, 37–38, Pakistani militant commander, drone strike.
- Susan Nolen-Hoeksema, 53, American psychologist and author, complications from heart surgery.
- Jamie Oglesby, 84, American politician.
- Kishore Pawar, 86, Indian political and trade union leader.
- Stephen Resnick, 74, American economist, leukemia.
- Alexei Rudeanu, 73, Romanian writer.
- Richard Shenton, 86, Jersey politician.
- Renzo Soldani, 87, Italian cyclist.
- Rudolf Szanwald, 81, Austrian footballer (Wiener Sport-Club).
- Teresa Torańska, 69, Polish journalist (Gazeta Wyborcza) and writer.
- Wen-Ying Tsai, 84, Chinese–born American artist.
- Ned Wertimer, 89, American actor (The Jeffersons, Pirates of the Caribbean: At World's End), complications from a fall.

=== 3 ===
- Lars T. Bjella, 90, Norwegian politician.
- Sir Robert Clark, 88, British naval officer and businessman.
- George Falconer, 66, Scottish footballer (Dundee, Raith Rovers), heart attack.
- Alfie Fripp, 98, British RAF airman, longest-serving British POW during World War II.
- Ted Godwin, 79, Canadian artist, complications from heart attack.
- M. S. Gopalakrishnan, 81, Indian violinist.
- Marianne Grunberg-Manago, 91, Russian-born French biochemist.
- Jimmy Halliday, 85, Scottish politician, National Chairman of the Scottish National Party (1956–1960).
- Robert C. Holland, 87, American economist, member of Federal Reserve Board of Governors (1973–1976), dementia.
- Kanang anak Langkau, 67, Malaysian soldier, Seri Pahlawan Gagah Perkasa recipient, heart attack.
- Richard A. Long, 85, American author and historian.
- Ivan Mackerle, 70, Czech cryptozoologist.
- William Maxson, 82, American military commander, complications from heart surgery.
- John McAndrew, 85, Gaelic footballer.
- Preben Munthe, 90, Norwegian economist.
- Sergiu Nicolaescu, 82, Romanian film director (Michael the Brave), actor (A Police Superintendent Accuses) and Senator (1992–2004, 2008–2012), cardiac arrest.
- Andrew P. O'Rourke, 79, American politician and judge (New York Supreme Court).
- Jaime Ortiz-Patiño, 82, French-born Spanish golf promoter, creator of Valderrama Golf Club, President of the World Bridge Federation (1976–1986).
- Shikaripura Ranganatha Rao, 90, Indian archeologist.
- Vladimir Sargsyan, 77, Armenian scientist.
- Hisayuki Sasaki, 48, Japanese golfer, cardiac arrest.
- Thomas Schäuble, 64, German politician, complications following a heart attack.
- Selkirk, 24, English champion racehorse (Queen Elizabeth II Stakes, Celebration Mile, Lockinge Stakes), natural causes.
- Patty Shepard, 67, American-born Spanish movie actress, heart attack.
- Burry Stander, 25, South African Olympic (2008, 2012) mountain biker, traffic collision.
- Paul Taff, 92, American television executive and executive producer (Mister Rogers' Neighborhood, The French Chef).

=== 4 ===
- Mohammad Aeltemesh, 64, Indian lawyer.
- Sir Geoffrey de Bellaigue, 81, British Surveyor of the Queen's Works of Art (1972–1996).
- Bhanumati Devi, 78, Burmese-born Indian actress (Matira Manisha), heart failure.
- Frank Eke, 81, Nigerian medical doctor and politician.
- Pete Elliott, 86, American Hall of Fame college football player (Michigan), Executive Director of the Pro Football Hall of Fame (1979–1995).
- Ed Emory, 75, American football coach (East Carolina University, 1980–1984).
- Wally Feurzeig, 85, American computer scientist, invented Logo.
- Pir Gohar, 81, Pakistani poet, songwriter, critic and freedom activist, cardiac arrest.
- Murray Henderson, 91, Canadian hockey player (Boston Bruins).
- Thomas Holtzmann, 85, German stage and film actor.
- Nilmar Janbu, 91, Norwegian engineer and geotechnician.
- Sammy Johns, 66, American singer-songwriter ("Chevy Van", "America").
- Derek Kevan, 77, English footballer (West Bromwich Albion).
- Salik Lucknawi, 99, Indian Urdu poet.
- Tony Lip, 82, American actor (Donnie Brasco, Goodfellas, The Sopranos).
- Vittorio Missoni, 58, Italian fashion designer, CEO of Missoni, plane crash.
- Lassaâd Ouertani, 32, Tunisian footballer, traffic collision.
- Yevgeny Pepelyaev, 94, Russian Soviet-era fighter pilot, Korean War flying ace.
- Robert Phelps, 86, American mathematician.
- John Saban, 84, American football player.
- Nikos Samaras, 42, Greek volleyball player, brain aneurysm.
- Gene Segerblom, 94, American politician, member of the Nevada State Assembly (1992–2000).
- Şenay, 62, Turkish singer, respiratory failure.
- Anwar Shamim, 81, Pakistani Air Force air marshal, Chief of Air Staff (1978–1985).
- Amanda Stassart, 89, Belgian resistance member.
- Bryan Stoltenberg, 40, American football player (San Diego Chargers, Carolina Panthers), injuries sustained in traffic collision.
- Sándor Szoboszlai, 87, Hungarian actor.
- Jim Watson, 95, English politician, Mayor of Blackburn (1982–1983), pneumonia.
- Zoran Žižić, 61, Montenegrin politician, Prime Minister of the Federal Republic of Yugoslavia (2000–2001).

=== 5 ===
- Haradhan Banerjee, 86, Indian actor, pneumonia.
- Piet de Bekker, 91, Dutch politician.
- Gwendoline Butler, 90, British author.
- Anders Carlberg, 69, Swedish politician, writer and social worker.
- Pierre Cogan, 98, French racing cyclist.
- T. S. Cook, 65, American screenwriter (The China Syndrome), cancer.
- Willi Dreesen, 84, Swiss painter and sculptor.
- Dave Edwards, 74, American politician, member of the Wyoming House of Representatives (2000–2008), complications from a stroke.
- Trygve Goa, 87, Norwegian printmaker.
- Martha Greenhouse, 91, American actress (Bananas, The Stepford Wives, Car 54, Where Are You?), Screen Actors Guild official.
- Abraham Hecht, 90, American rabbi and sect leader.
- Joselo, 76, Venezuelan actor, liver illness.
- Leung Ping-kwan, 63, Hong Kong poet, novelist, essayist, translator, teacher, and scholar, lung cancer.
- Jeff Lewis, 39, American football player (Carolina Panthers, Denver Broncos), accidental drug overdose.
- Ann-Britt Leyman, 90, Swedish Olympic athlete.
- Bruce McCarty, 92, American architect.
- Mary Susan McIntosh, 76, British sociologist, feminist and political activist, stroke.
- Richard McWilliam, 59, American entrepreneur, co-founder of Upper Deck Company, alcohol poisoning.
- Yvonne Marie Louise Odette Renée Ménard, 83, French burlesque dancer
- Fitzroy Newsum, 94, American military pilot (Tuskegee Airmen).
- Joe Padilla, 48, American baseball umpire.
- Joseph-Aurèle Plourde, 97, Canadian Roman Catholic prelate, Archbishop of Ottawa (1967–1989).
- Fay Bellamy Powell, 74, American civil rights activist.
- Claude Préfontaine, 79, Canadian comedian.
- Thomas Schmidt-Kowalski, 63, German composer.
- Marie-Hélène Schwartz, 99, French mathematician.
- Harry Searson, 88, English footballer (Leeds United, York City), cancer.
- Vladimir Šenauer, 82, Croatian footballer.
- Chandler Williams, 27, American football player (Toronto Argonauts).
- Sol Yurick, 87, American author (The Warriors), lung cancer.

=== 6 ===
- Neil Adcock, 81, South African cricketer, bowel cancer.
- Qazi Hussain Ahmad, 74, Pakistani politician, Ameer of Jamaat-e-Islami (1987–2009), cardiac arrest.
- Cho Sung-min, 39, South Korean baseball player (Yomiuri Giants), suicide by hanging.
- Paul Grundy, 77, Australian civil engineer and academic.
- Gerard Helders, 107, Dutch politician, Minister of Colonial Affairs (1957–1959), Member of the Council of State (1959–1975), nation's oldest living man (since 2012).
- John Ingram, 83, American politician, North Carolina Commissioner of Insurance (1973–1985), heart attack.
- Metin Kaçan, 51, Turkish novelist, suicide by jumping.
- Jon Ander López, 36, Spanish footballer, heart attack.
- Jeffrey O'Connell, 84, American legal expert, professor and attorney, champion of no-fault insurance.
- Madanjeet Singh, 88, Indian diplomat, artist, writer and philanthropist, stroke.
- Luigi Spaventa, 78, Italian politician and academic, MP (1976–1983), Minister of Treasury (1988–1989), Minister of Budget (1993–1994).
- Ruth Carter Stevenson, 89, American museum founder, President of the Amon Carter Museum.
- Myron Stolaroff, 92, American psychedelic researcher.
- Bart Van den Bossche, 48, Belgian singer and television presenter, aortic aneurysm.
- Roy Walker, 81, British production designer (Barry Lyndon, The Shining, The Talented Mr. Ripley), Oscar winner (1976).
- Dalia Wood, 88, Canadian politician.

=== 7 ===
- Nancy Burley, 82, Australian Olympic figure skater.
- Larry Clapp, 66, American politician, member of Wyoming House of Representatives (1978–1979), suicide by gunshot.
- Stanley Cohen, 70, British sociologist, Parkinson's disease.
- Jim Cosman, 69, American baseball player (St. Louis Cardinals, Chicago Cubs), Alzheimer's disease.
- Richard Ben Cramer, 62, American journalist, author (What It Takes: The Way to the White House) and Pulitzer Prize winner (1979), lung cancer.
- Maria de Fátima Silva de Sequeira Dias, 54, Portuguese Azorean historian and academic.
- Birck Elgaaen, 95, Norwegian Olympic equestrian.
- David R. Ellis, 60, American stuntman (Lethal Weapon, Scarface) and film director (Snakes on a Plane).
- Jeremy Hindley, 69, British horse trainer, motor neurone disease.
- Huell Howser, 67, American television personality (California's Gold) and actor (Winnie the Pooh), prostate cancer.
- Ada Louise Huxtable, 91, American architecture critic (Wall Street Journal) and Pulitzer Prize winner (1970), cancer.
- Kabir Ahmad Jaisi, 78, Indian academic.
- Jiřina Jirásková, 81, Czech actress and UNICEF Czech Committee President (2002–2011).
- Maruša Krese, 65, Slovene poet, writer and journalist.
- Louise Laurin, 77, Canadian educator and activist.
- Mary Madkour, 85, American politician.
- Epifanie Norocel, 80, Romanian archbishop of Buzău and Vrancea, myocardial infarction.
- Gonzalo Puyat II, 79, Filipino sport administrator and politician, President of FIBA (1976–1984), cardiac arrest.
- Joseph Roney, 77, Haitian politician.
- Harvey Shapiro, 88, American poet and newspaper editor (The New York Times), complications from surgery.
- Fred L. Turner, 80, American restaurant industry executive, CEO of McDonald's (1974–1987), Chairman (1977–1987), complications of pneumonia.
- Dorothy Vest, 93, American tennis player.
- Nadeane Walker, 91, American journalist, fashion editor and foreign correspondent (Associated Press, International Herald Tribune).
- Zvi Yavetz, 87, Romanian-born Israeli historian and Israel Prize winner (1990).

=== 8 ===
- Asbjørn Aarnes, 89, Norwegian literary historian.
- Tandyn Almer, 70, American musician.
- Kenojuak Ashevak, 85, Canadian Inuk artist, lung cancer.
- Mike Brannan, 57, American golf player, kidney cancer.
- Bernard Delcampe, 80, French footballer.
- Matthew Dickens, 51, American actor and choreographer (The Aviator, Rent, Dreamgirls), cancer.
- Antonio Frasconi, 93, Argentine-born American woodcut artist and educator.
- Otto Hornung, 92, Czech philatelist and journalist.
- Jeanne Manford, 92, American gay rights activist.
- Shirley Matthews, 70, Canadian pop singer.
- Alasdair Milne, 82, British television producer, Director-General of the BBC (1982–1987), stroke.
- Manuel Mota, 46, Spanish fashion designer, suicide by exsanguination.
- Watson Parker, 88, American historian and author, specialist on the Black Hills.
- Cornel Pavlovici, 70, Romanian footballer (Steaua București), Liga I top scorer in 1964.
- Ole A. Sæther, 76, Norwegian entomologist.
- Ten Most Wanted, 12, American thoroughbred racehorse, winner of Travers Stakes (2003).
- A. K. Warder, 88, Canadian academic.
- Percy White, 96, British chemist and nuclear scientist.

=== 9 ===
- Werner Altegoer, 77, German businessman and football administrator (VfL Bochum).
- Brigitte Askonas, 89, Austrian-born British immunologist.
- Samuel E. Blum, 92, American chemist and physicist.
- Vivian Brown, 85, American media personality.
- James M. Buchanan, 93, American economist, Nobel Prize (1986).
- Sakine Cansız, 54–55, Turkish Kurdish activist (Kurdistan Workers' Party), shooting.
- Peter Carson, 74, English publisher, editor and translator.
- Anscar Chupungco, 73, Filipino Benedictine monk and liturgist.
- Juan Curet, 84, Puerto Rican Olympic boxer.
- Frank Esposito, 84, American politician, Mayor of Norwalk, Connecticut (1987–2001).
- Jim Godbolt, 90, British jazz writer and historian.
- Hoàng Hiệp, 81, Vietnamese songwriter.
- Charly Jacobs, 64, Belgian footballer
- Katchit, 9, Irish Thoroughbred hurdler, colic.
- Tarsem King, Baron King of West Bromwich, 75, British Labour politician and peer, suspected heart attack.
- Ralph G. Martin, 92, American journalist.
- Rizana Nafeek, 24, Sri Lankan domestic helper, convicted of murder in Saudi Arabia, execution by beheading.
- Edward Odell, 65, American mathematician.
- Willis Page, 94, American symphony orchestra conductor.
- Robert L. Rock, 85, American politician, Lieutenant Governor of Indiana (1965–1969).
- Rex Trailer, 84, American television host (Boomtown, WBZ-TV) and musician, pneumonia.
- John Wise, 77, Canadian politician, MP for Elgin (1972–1988); Minister of Agriculture (1979–1980; 1984–1988).

=== 10 ===
- Christel Adelaar, 77, Dutch actress, lung cancer.
- Delmo Alberghini, 90, American athlete.
- Jimmy Bishop, 71, American politician.
- Antonino Calderone, 77, Italian criminal, Sicilian Mafioso.
- Geoffrey Coates, 95, English chemist.
- Evan S. Connell, 88, American novelist, poet, and short story-writer.
- Ted Cooke-Yarborough, 94, English physicist and engineer.
- James Draper, 87, South African cricket umpire.
- Bob Fenton, 89, New Zealand politician, MP for Hastings (1975–1978).
- Peter Fitz, 81, German stage and film actor.
- Trevor Gordon, 64, British–born Australian singer (The Marbles).
- George Gruntz, 80, Swiss jazz musician.
- Jay Handlan, 84, American basketball player (Washington and Lee University, Akron Goodyear Wingfoots).
- Michael Hofbauer, 49, Czech film actor, cancer.
- Karl-Erik Israelsson, 83, Swedish long jumper.
- Luigi Kuveiller, 85, Italian cinematographer.
- Franz Lehrndorfer, 84, German organist.
- Daniel McCarthy, 86, Canadian television producer (The Friendly Giant, Mr. Dressup, Sesame Park).
- Claude Nobs, 76, Swiss founder and general manager of Montreux Jazz Festival, complications from skiing accident.
- Lucien Poirier, 94, French Army general.
- Jean R. Preston, 77, American politician and teacher, member of the North Carolina General Assembly (1992–2012), complications from a fall.
- Jorge Selarón, 65, Chilean-born Brazilian painter and ceramist (Escadaria Selarón).
- Vincent Sombrotto, 89, American union official, president of NALC (1978–2002).
- Zhang Yongming, 56, Chinese murderer, executed.

=== 11 ===
- Thomas Bourgin, 26, French motorcycle racer, traffic collision.
- Gordon Chavunduka, 81, Zimbabwean sociologist and traditional healer.
- Dave Chisnall, 64, English rugby league player (Warrington Wolves).
- Guido Forti, 72, Italian motor racing team owner.
- Claude Fredericks, 89, American playwright and memoirist.
- Sam Halloin, 89, American politician, longest-serving mayor of Green Bay, Wisconsin (1979–1995).
- Brian Heffel, 68, Canadian Olympic wrestler.
- D. Brainerd Holmes, 91, American aeronautics executive, NASA Director of Manned Space Flight (1961–1963), complications from pneumonia.
- Sergei Issakov, 81, Estonian literary scholar, politician, and professor.
- Corinne Jacker, 79, American playwright and screenwriter.
- Robert Kee, 93, British writer, journalist and broadcaster.
- Liz Lands, 73, American soul singer.
- Paul J. Lunardi, 91, American politician.
- James Charles Macnab of Macnab, 86, Scottish aristocrat, chief of Clan MacNab.
- Ba Mamadou Mbaré, 67, Mauritanian politician, President of the Senate (since 2007), Interim President (2009).
- Mariangela Melato, 71, Italian actress (Swept Away, Flash Gordon, So Fine), pancreatic cancer.
- Khushi Murali, 49, Indian pop singer, cardiac arrest.
- Nguyễn Khánh, 85, Vietnamese politician and military leader, President of South Vietnam (1964–1965), illnesses related to diabetes.
- Tatsuji Nomura, 90, Japanese scientist.
- Jimmy O'Neill, 73, American disc jockey and television host (Shindig!), diabetes and heart complications.
- Tom Parry Jones, 77, Welsh inventor (electronic breathalyser).
- Murray Merle Schwartz, 81, American senior (former chief) judge (U.S. District Court for Delaware).
- Alemayehu Shumye, 24, Ethiopian long-distance runner, traffic collision.
- W. Reece Smith Jr., 87, American lawyer and academic.
- Aaron Swartz, 26, American programmer and internet activist, co-creator of Reddit, suicide by hanging.
- Fred Talbot, 71, American baseball player (New York Yankees).
- Billy Varga, 94, American professional wrestler and actor (Raging Bull), Alzheimer's disease.
- Lars Werner, 77, Swedish politician, leader of the Left Party (1975–1993), heart failure.
- John Wilkinson, 67, American rhythm guitarist (Elvis Presley's TCB Band), cancer.

=== 12 ===
- Guy de Alwis, 53, Sri Lankan cricketer, cancer.
- Gregory Victor Babic, 49, Australian writer.
- Precious Bryant, 71, American blues and country musician, complications of diabetes and heart failure.
- Anthony Cavendish, 85, English MI6 officer.
- Flor María Chalbaud, 91, First Lady of Venezuela.
- Harold Crowchild, 97, Canadian Tsuu T'ina elder and soldier, last Treaty 7 World War II veteran.
- William J. Cullerton, 90, American fighter pilot, World War II flying ace.
- Chuck Dalton, 85, Canadian basketball player, member of Olympic team (1952).
- John Martin Darko, 67, Ghanaian Roman Catholic prelate, Bishop of Sekondi-Takoradi (1998–2011).
- Helen Elliot, 85, Scottish table tennis player, world champion (1949 and 1950).
- Harry Fearnley, 77, English footballer.
- Emmett Forrest, 85, American collector, founder of the Andy Griffith Museum.
- Bubba Harris, 86, American baseball player (Philadelphia Athletics, Cleveland Indians).
- Jake Hartford, 63, American radio personality, heart attack.
- Delilah Jackson, 84, American historian.
- Jean Krier, 64, Luxembourgish poet.
- Leon Leyson, 83, Polish-American Holocaust survivor.
- Anna Lizaran, 68, Spanish actress, cancer.
- William Andrew MacKay, 83, Canadian academic, President of Dalhousie University (1980–1986).
- Hasan Mahdi, 76, Indian anatomist.
- Walt McPherson, 96, American basketball coach (San Jose State University), Commissioner of the WCC (1965–1969).
- Ourasi, 32, French Trotter harness racing horse, winner of Prix d'Amérique (1986–1988, 1990).
- Eugene Patterson, 89, American newspaper editor (The Atlanta Journal-Constitution), Pulitzer Prize winner (1967), cancer.
- Viktor Platan, 93, Finnish Olympic pentathlete.
- Norma Redpath, 84, Australian artist.
- Roxana Ng, 61, Canadian academic, cancer.
- John C. Rule, 83, American historian.
- Yuri Schmidt, 76, Russian lawyer and human rights activist, cancer.
- Roy Sinclair, 68, English footballer (Watford).
- Steven Utley, 64, American science-fiction writer, cancer.

=== 13 ===
- Diogenes Allen, 80, American philosopher.
- Bille Brown, 61, Australian actor (Oscar and Lucinda, Killer Elite, The Chronicles of Narnia: The Voyage of the Dawn Treader), bowel cancer.
- Stanley Caine, 76, English actor (The Italian Job).
- Andrea Carrea, 88, Italian road bicycle racer.
- Jacki Clérico, 83, French businessman, owner of the Moulin Rouge, cancer.
- Rodney Mims Cook Sr., 88, American politician.
- David Gibbs, 76, American politician, member of the Mississippi House of Representatives (since 1992), cancer.
- Enzo Hernández, 63, Venezuelan baseball player (San Diego Padres, Los Angeles Dodgers), suicide.
- Jürgen Himmelbauer, 54, Austrian politician.
- Mykhailo Horyn, 82, Ukrainian politician, prisoner of conscience and member of Soviet dissidents movement.
- Itaru Ishida, 33, Japanese Magic: The Gathering player.
- Kari Jormakka, 53, Finnish architect, historian, theoretician, critic and teacher, heart attack.
- Riki Kawara, 75, Japanese politician, Director General of the Defense Agency (1987–1988), pneumonia.
- Deyan Kolev, 47, Bulgarian Olympic gymnast.
- Sanivalati Laulau, 61, Fijian rugby union player.
- Gordon Lee, 54, American comic book store owner, complications from a stroke.
- H. Craig Lewis, 68, American politician, member of the Pennsylvania State Senate (1975–1995), heart attack.
- Chia-Chiao Lin, 96, Chinese-born American applied mathematician and professor.
- Benny Luke, 73, American-French actor and dancer.
- Alfred K. Mann, 92, American physicist.
- Gerald McKee, 83, American construction management executive.
- Jack Recknitz, 81, German actor.
- Jerry Sisk Jr., 59, American gemologist, co-founder of Jewelry Television.
- Rusi Surti, 76, Indian cricketer, complications from a stroke.
- Katie Stewart, 78, British cookery writer.
- Balagangadharanatha Swamiji, 67, Indian religious sect leader, multiple organ failure.
- Joseph Syoz, 75, French Olympic boxer.
- Geoff Thomas, 64, Welsh footballer (Swansea City).
- Arthur Wightman, 90, American mathematical physicist (Wightman axioms).

=== 14 ===
- Giorgio Alverà, 69, Italian world champion (1975) and Olympic bobsledder.
- Conrad Bain, 89, Canadian-born American actor (Maude, Diff'rent Strokes, Mr. President), complications from a stroke.
- Danny Beath, 52, British photographer and botanist, heart attack.
- Yehudith Birk, 86, Israeli biochemist (Bowman–Birk protease inhibitor).
- Yaakov Blau, 84, Israeli rabbi.
- Neville Bonitto, 88, Jamaica cricketer.
- Tony Conran, 81, Welsh poet and translator.
- Paul Droubay, 86, American radio broadcaster (KDAB), fought the U.S. Federal Communications Commission over expanded area radio coverage.
- Fred Flanagan, 88, Australian VFL football player (Geelong), Hall of Fame member (1998).
- Prospero Gallinari, 62, Italian terrorist (Red Brigades).
- John P. Gaston, 82, American politician.
- John McKinlay, 80, American Olympic rower.
- Maharani Gina Narayan, 82, British-born Indian royal.
- Eric Norstad, 88, American potter and architect.
- José Posada, 72, Spanish politician and entrepreneur, president of Galician Coalition, MEP (1993–1994, 1999).
- Vic Rowen, 93, American football coach (San Francisco State).
- Jasuben Shilpi, 64, Indian sculptor, cardiac arrest.

=== 15 ===
- Daphne Anderson, 90, British actress and singer.
- Princess Margarita of Baden, 80, German aristocrat.
- Wickrama Bogoda, 72, Sri Lankan movie actor.
- Jennings Michael Burch, 71, American writer.
- Maurice Camyré, 97, Canadian Olympic boxer.
- Carlos Castillo Medrano, 39, Guatemalan politician, shot.
- Chucho Castillo, 68, Mexican boxer, WBA and WBC Bantamweight Champion (1970–1971), heart attack.
- Zakiah Daradjat, 86, Indonesian psychologist.
- Aida Desta, 85, Ethiopian royal.
- Daniel Edelman, 92, American public relations executive, founder of Edelman, heart failure.
- Generous, 24, Irish Thoroughbred horse, winner of the Irish Derby, Epsom Derby and King George VI and Queen Elizabeth Stakes (1991).
- Bill Glynn, 87, American baseball player (Philadelphia Phillies, Cleveland Indians).
- George Gund III, 75, American sports franchise co-owner (San Jose Sharks, Cleveland Cavaliers), cancer.
- Eifan Saadoun Al Issawi, 37, Iraqi politician, MP for Fallujah, bombing.
- Balthazar Korab, 86, Hungarian-born American architectural photographer.
- Magomed Gadjievich Magomedov, 55, Russian judge, member of the Supreme Court of Dagestan, shot.
- Susan Manning, 59, Scottish academic.
- Ferenc Nádasdy, 75, Hungarian aristocrat, last male member of the House of Nádasdy.
- Nagisa Oshima, 80, Japanese director and screenwriter (In the Realm of the Senses).
- Michel Pollien, 75, French Roman Catholic prelate, Auxiliary Bishop of Paris (1996–2012).
- Zurab Popkhadze, 40, Georgian footballer and manager, suicide by hanging.
- Robert Gordon Robertson, 95, Canadian civil servant, 7th Commissioner of the Northwest Territories.
- Aron Schvartzman, 104, Argentine chess master.
- Clayton Silva, 74, Brazilian actor and comedian (A Praça é Nossa), cancer.
- Nii Tackie Tawiah III, 72, Ghanaian royal, Ga Mantse (since 2006). (death announced on this date)
- John Thomas, 71, American Olympic high-jumper.
- Yuli Turovsky, 73, Russian-born Canadian conductor and cellist (I Musici de Montréal Chamber Orchestra).
- Dharam Singh Uppal, 53, Indian international track and field athlete, cardiac arrest.
- Yang Baibing, 92, Chinese military leader and politician.

=== 16 ===
- Wayne D. Anderson, 82, American baseball and basketball coach (University of Idaho).
- Peter Barnes, 50, British pilot, helicopter crash.
- Peter Boyle, 61, Scottish-born Australian association footballer.
- Gerry Brisson, 75, Canadian ice hockey player (Montreal Canadiens).
- André Cassagnes, 86, French electrical engineer, inventor of the Etch A Sketch.
- Robert Citron, 87, American politician.
- Burhan Doğançay, 83, Turkish artist and photographer.
- Jake Froese, 87, Canadian politician, MP for Niagara Falls, Lord Mayor of Niagara-on-the-Lake.
- Robert Gleason, 42, American convicted murderer, execution by electric chair.
- Noé Hernández, 34, Mexican Olympic silver medal-winning (2000) race walker, cardiac arrest.
- Ralph B. Hodges, 82, American politician.
- Sir Barry Holloway, 78, Australian-born Papua New Guinean politician, Speaker of the National Parliament (1972–1977).
- Samson Kimobwa, 57, Kenyan long-distance runner, stomach ailment.
- Yevdokiya Mekshilo, 81, Russian cross-country skier, Olympic champion (1964).
- Gussie Moran, 89, American tennis player.
- Isidro Pérez, 48, Mexican boxer, WBO Flyweight Champion (1990–1992). (body discovered on this date)
- Pauline Phillips, 94, American advice columnist ("Dear Abby"), complications from Alzheimer's disease.
- Kroum Pindoff, 97, Greek-born Canadian businessman and philanthropist.
- James W. Plummer, 92, American aerospace engineer, United States Under Secretary of the Air Force (1973–1976).
- Nic Potter, 61, British bassist (Van der Graaf Generator), pneumonia.
- Perrette Pradier, 74, French actress, heart attack.
- Glen P. Robinson, 89, American businessman, founded Scientific Atlanta.
- Hōō Tomomichi, 56, Japanese sumo wrestler, heart disease.
- Aslan Usoyan, 75, Georgian-born Russian mobster, shooting.
- Dick Westcott, 85, Portuguese-born South African cricketer (Western Province, national team).

=== 17 ===
- Mehmet Ali Birand, 71, Turkish journalist, columnist and documentarian, cardiac arrest.
- Bill Albright, 83, American football player (New York Giants).
- Ilmar Aluvee, 43, Estonian Olympic skier, fall.
- Jakob Arjouni, 48, German author, cancer.
- Tissa Balasuriya, 89, Sri Lankan Roman Catholic priest and theologian.
- Claude Black, 80, American jazz pianist, cancer.
- Robert F. Chew, 52, American actor (The Wire), heart attack.
- Yves Debay, 58, Belgian journalist, shot.
- Fernando Guillén, 80, Spanish actor.
- Eric Handley, 86, British classical scholar.
- Sophiya Haque, 41, English actress (Coronation Street, Wanted, House of Anubis), singer and dancer, cancer.
- James Hood, 70, American civil rights pioneer, among first African Americans to register at the University of Alabama.
- Homayoun Khorram, 82, Iranian violinist, colorectal cancer.
- Fred J. Lincoln, 75, American actor, director (The Last House on the Left) and pornographic director.
- Linh Quang Viên, 94, Vietnamese army general.
- Tony Martin, 70, Trinidadian-born American historian.
- Paul McKeever, 57, British police officer, Chairman of the Police Federation of England and Wales, embolism.
- Eng Abner Nangwale, 79, Ugandan politician.
- John Nkomo, 78, Zimbabwean politician, Second Vice President (2009–2013), cancer.
- John R. Powers, 67, American author (Do Black Patent Leather Shoes Really Reflect Up?), heart attack.
- Guram Sagharadze, 84, Georgian actor.
- Sumihiro Tomii, 63, Japanese Olympic skier.
- Michael Triplett, 48, American journalist, cancer.
- Lizbeth Webb, 86, English soprano and stage actress.

=== 18 ===
- Martin Barbarič, 42, Czech footballer, suicide by gunshot.
- Bobby Bennett, 74, American musician, member of singing group The Famous Flames.
- Jeff Cahill, 44, American actor (ER, NYPD Blue, Dangerous Minds).
- Walmor Chagas, 82, Brazilian actor (Xica da Silva, São Paulo, Sociedade Anônima), apparent suicide by gunshot.
- Sean Fallon, 90, Irish association footballer (Celtic).
- Jim Horning, 70, American computer scientist.
- Ken Jones, 77, Welsh footballer.
- Wolfgang Ilgenfritz, 56, Austrian politician.
- Alfons Lemmens, 93, Dutch footballer.
- David Lewis, 85, Zimbabwean cricketer (Rhodesia).
- Wilhelm Löwinger, 96, Austrian Olympic speed skater.
- Jon Mannah, 23, Australian rugby league player (Cronulla Sharks), Hodgkin's lymphoma.
- Lewis Marnell, 30, Australian skateboarder, diabetes.
- Harold Marshall, 94, Canadian military veteran.
- Morné van der Merwe, 39, South African rugby union player (Western Province, Stormers), brain cancer.
- Ron Nachman, 70, Israeli politician and Knesset member, cancer.
- Borghild Niskin, 88, Norwegian Olympic alpine skier and Holmenkollen medalist.
- Jacques Sadoul, 78, French writer and book editor.
- Gordon Snee, 82, British abstract painter.
- Theodore Stern, 100, American educator.
- Lynn Willis, American game designer (Call of Cthulhu).

=== 19 ===
- Toktamış Ateş, 68, Turkish academic (Istanbul University), political commentator and writer, multiple organ failure.
- Anatoly Bannik, 91, Ukrainian chess player.
- Mehnaz Begum, 63, Pakistani singer.
- Gayle Bluth, 87, Mexican Olympic basketball player.
- Milt Bolling, 82, American baseball player (Boston Red Sox), complications from heart surgery.
- John Braheny, 74, American songwriter.
- Nick Broad, 38, English football nutritionist (Birmingham City, Blackburn Rovers, Chelsea, Paris Saint-Germain), traffic collision.
- Michael Colley, 74, American navy officer and politician.
- Happy Fernandez, 74, American political activist and Philadelphia City Councilwoman (1992–1999), stroke.
- Abderrahim Goumri, 36, Moroccan Olympic (2004, 2008) long-distance runner, traffic collision.
- Viggo Hagstrøm, 58, Norwegian legal scholar.
- Basil Hirschowitz, 87, American gastroenterologist.
- İsmet Hürmüzlü, 75, Iraqi Turkmen actor (Valley of the Wolves: Iraq), screenwriter and director.
- Steve Knight, 77, American musician (Mountain) and councilman, complications from Parkinsons disease.
- Taihō Kōki, 72, Japanese sumo wrestler, ventricular tachycardia.
- Michel Las Vergnas, 72, French mathematician.
- Li Minhua, 95, Chinese physicist, academician of the Chinese Academy of Sciences.
- Jim Marking, 85, American college basketball coach (South Dakota State).
- Hans Massaquoi, 87, German-born American journalist and author.
- Steven Muller, 85, American educator, President of Johns Hopkins University (1972–1990), respiratory failure.
- Stan Musial, 92, American Hall of Fame baseball player (St. Louis Cardinals), Alzheimer's disease.
- Julia Penelope, 71, American linguist, author, and philosopher.
- Mary Jane Phillips-Matz, 86, American music historian, heart failure.
- Frank Pooler, 86, American choirmaster and composer.
- Andrée Putman, 87, French interior and product designer.
- A. Rafiq, 64, Indonesian singer and actor.
- Marcel Sisniega Campbell, 53, Mexican chess player and film director, heart attack.
- John Trim, 88, British linguist.
- Earl Weaver, 82, American Hall of Fame baseball manager (Baltimore Orioles), apparent heart attack.
- Ian Wells, 48, English footballer (Hereford United).

=== 20 ===
- Ron Fraser, 79, American Hall of Fame college baseball coach (University of Miami).
- Richard Garneau, 82, Canadian sports journalist.
- Matilde Lindo, 58, Nicaraguan feminist and activist, heart attack.
- Pavlos Matesis, 80, Greek writer.
- Donald Oesterling, 85, American politician.
- Dolores Prida, 69, Cuban-born American advice columnist (Latina).
- Toyo Shibata, 101, Japanese poet.
- Helen Wyatt Snapp, 94, American aviator, complications of a broken hip.
- Adusumilli Srikrishna, 58, Indian organic chemist.
- Tracy Sugarman, 91, American illustrator.
- John Melville Turner, 90, Canadian politician.
- Freddie Williams, 86, Welsh motorcycle speedway world champion (1950, 1953), stroke.

=== 21 ===
- Kamal Basu, 94, Indian politician, Mayor of Calcutta (1985–1990).
- Alden W. Clausen, 89, American banking executive, President of the World Bank (1981–1986), complications from pneumonia.
- David Coe, 58, Australian businessman, suspected heart attack.
- Riccardo Garrone, 76, Italian entrepreneur, cancer.
- Jean Giambrone, 91, American sportswriter (Times-Union), first female writer awarded full press credentials at The Masters, blood clot in lung.
- Zina Harman, 98, British-born Israeli politician.
- Donald Hornig, 92, American chemist, explosives expert, Manhattan Project member, teacher and presidential science advisor, President of Brown University (1970–1976).
- Ahmet Mete Işıkara, 72, Turkish professor of geology and earthquake expert, respiratory failure.
- Geoffrey Matthews, 89, British ornithologist.
- Inez McCormack, 69, Northern Irish trade union leader and human rights campaigner, cancer.
- Jake McNiece, 93, American World War II paratrooper, leader of the Filthy Thirteen.
- Chumpol Silpa-archa, 72, Thai politician, Minister of Tourism and Sports (since 2008), Deputy Prime Minister (2011–2013), renal failure.
- M. S. Udayamurthy, 85, Indian Tamil language writer.
- Andrew Weekes, 72, Kittitian cricket umpire.
- Michael Winner, 77, British film director (Death Wish, The Mechanic, Won Ton Ton, the Dog Who Saved Hollywood) and food critic, liver disease.

=== 22 ===
- Said Ali al-Shihri, 41–42, Saudi Al-Qaeda leader, drone strike.
- Kevin Ash, 53, British motorcycling journalist, traffic collision.
- Ignacio Barrios, 82, Mexican painter.
- Robert Bonnaud, 83, French anti-colonialist historian.
- William J. Breed, 84, American geologist.
- Zulema Castro de Peña, 92, Argentine human rights activist (Mothers of the Plaza de Mayo).
- John Cheng, 52, Singaporean getai performer and actor, apparent heart attack.
- Jean-Léon Destiné, 94, Haitian-born American dancer and choreographer.
- Leslie Frankenheimer, 64, American set decorator (Blade Runner, The Blues Brothers, Star Trek: Voyager), leukemia.
- Anna Litvinova, 29, Russian fashion model, won Miss Russia (Miss Universe competition) (2006), cancer.
- George H. Ludwig, 85, American space scientist.
- Günther Maritschnigg, 79, German Olympic wrestler.
- Lídia Mattos, 88, Brazilian actress, pneumonia.
- Hinton Mitchem, 74, American politician, Alabama Senate (1979–1986, 1987–2011), Alzheimer's disease.
- Jimmy Payne, 86, English footballer (Liverpool).
- Ted Talbert, 70, American documentary filmmaker, heart attack.
- Margareta Teodorescu, 80, Romanian chess player.
- Lucyna Winnicka, 84, Polish actress.

=== 23 ===
- Ismail al-Armouti, 80, Jordanian politician, Minister of Municipal and Rural Affairs (1976).
- Ed Bouchee, 79, American baseball player (Philadelphia Phillies, Chicago Cubs, New York Mets).
- Józef Glemp, 83, Polish Roman Catholic cardinal, Archbishop of Warsaw (1981–2006) and Primate of Poland (1981–2009), lung cancer.
- Jacques Grimonpon, 87, French footballer (Lille OSC, Le Havre AC, Girondins Bordeaux, Olympique Lyonnais).
- Tom Jankiewicz, 49, American screenwriter (Grosse Pointe Blank).
- Made Katib, 71, Malaysian Anglican prelate, Bishop of the Diocese of Kuching.
- Janice Knickrehm, 87, American actress (Halloween: The Curse of Michael Myers).
- Jan Ormerod, 66, Australian illustrator of children's books, cancer.
- Lucien Paiement, 80, Canadian politician, Mayor of Laval (1973–1981).
- Dolours Price, 61, Irish republican political activist and PIRA volunteer, toxic prescription drugs mix.
- Mike Rashkow, 71, American songwriter and advertising executive.
- Jonathan Rendall, 48, English author.
- Juan Carlos Rosero, 50, Ecuadorian Olympic and professional cyclist.
- Susan Douglas Rubeš, 87, Austrian-born Canadian actress.
- Tatsuo Sato, 75, Japanese politician.
- Peter van der Merwe, 75, South African cricketer.
- Jean-Félix-Albert-Marie Vilnet, 90, French Roman Catholic prelate, Bishop of Saint-Dié (1964–1983) and Lille (1983–1998).
- John Wood, 62, Canadian Olympic canoeist, suicide.
- Frank Zakem, 81, Canadian politician and businessman, Mayor of Charlottetown (1975–1978).

=== 24 ===
- Yemi Ajibade, 83, Nigerian–born British playwright and actor.
- Kevin Ashley, 71, Australian rugby league player (Eastern Suburbs).
- Zózimo Bulbul, 75, Brazilian actor (Quilombo, Sagarana: The Duel) and filmmaker, heart attack.
- José Colomer, 77, Spanish Olympic field hockey player.
- Graeme Fellowes, 78, Australian football player.
- Khuseyn Gakayev, 42, Chechen nationalist military leader, shot.
- Emanuel R. Gold, American lawyer and politician.
- Dave Harper, 74, English footballer.
- Nurul Islam, 84, Bangladeshi physician and educator.
- Miroslav Janů, 53, Czech footballer, heart attack.
- Kristján Jóhannsson 83, Icelandic Olympic athlete.
- Gottfried Landwehr, 83, German physicist.
- Barbara Leonard, 88, American politician, Secretary of State of Rhode Island (1993–1995).
- Jim Line, 87, American basketball player (University of Kentucky).
- Umashanker Singh, 73, Indian politician, lung infection.
- Richard G. Stern, 84, American writer, cancer.
- Lucien Stryk, 88, American poet and translator.
- Harry Taylor, 77, American baseball player (Kansas City Athletics).
- Jim Wallwork, 93, British World War II glider pilot.

=== 25 ===
- Martial Asselin, 88, Canadian politician, MP for Charlevoix (1958–1962; 1965–1972), Minister (1963), Senator (1972–1990) and Lieutenant Governor of Quebec (1990–1996).
- Leila Buckley, 96, British poet, novelist and translator.
- Rade Bulat, 92, Croatian politician and partisan.
- Gregory Carroll, 83, American R&B singer (The Four Buddies, The Orioles) and songwriter ("Just One Look"), aneurysm.
- Normand Corbeil, 56, Canadian composer (Double Jeopardy, Extreme Ops, The Statement), pancreatic cancer.
- Kevin Heffernan, 83, Irish Gaelic football player and manager.
- Max Kampelman, 92, American diplomat, heart failure.
- Frank Keating, 75, English sports writer, pneumonia.
- Irene Koumarianou, 82, Greek actress, cardiac arrest.
- Aase Nordmo Løvberg, 89, Norwegian opera singer.
- Lloyd Phillips, 63, South African-born New Zealand producer (Inglourious Basterds, Vertical Limit, Man of Steel), heart attack.
- Pepe Pimentel, 83, Filipino television presenter.
- Shozo Shimamoto, 85, Japanese artist.
- Cecil Womack, 65, American singer-songwriter (Womack & Womack).
- Oleg Vassiliev, 81, Russian painter.

=== 26 ===
- Peter Beales, 76, British rosarian, author and lecturer.
- Ann Bartlett, 92, American politician and political campaign chairwoman, First Lady of Oklahoma (1967–1971).
- Leroy "Sugarfoot" Bonner, 69, American funk singer and guitarist (Ohio Players), cancer.
- Gökhan Budak, 45, Turkish academic administrator and professor of quantum physics, suicide by exsanguination and jumping.
- Lesley Fitz-Simons, 51, Scottish actress (Take the High Road), cancer.
- Christine M. Jones, 83, American politician, member of Maryland House of Delegates (1982–1994).
- Sukekiyo Kameyama, 58, Japanese voice actor (Winnie-the-Pooh), pneumonia.
- Gour Khyapa, 65, Indian Baul singer, traffic collision.
- Stefan Kudelski, 81, Polish audio engineer, inventor of the Nagra recorder.
- Hans Ulrich Lehmann, 75, Swiss classical composer.
- Daurene Lewis, 69, Canadian politician, nation's first black female mayor.
- Patricia Lovell, 83, Australian television host (Mr. Squiggle) and film producer (Picnic at Hanging Rock), liver cancer.
- Hiroshi Nakajima, 84, Japanese physician, Director-General of the World Health Organization (1988–1998).
- Acer Nethercott, 35, British coxswain, Olympic silver medallist (2008) and two-time Boat Race winner, cancer.
- Padma Kant Shukla, 62, Indian physicist, heart attack.
- James Stewart, 78, Irish politician, chair of the Communist Party of Ireland (2001–2004).
- Shōtarō Yasuoka, 92, Japanese writer.

=== 27 ===
- Thakurdas Bang, 95, Indian Gandhian economist.
- Ivan Bodiul, 95, Soviet politician, First Secretary of the Moldovan Communist Party (1961–1980), Deputy Chairman of the USSR Council of Ministers (1980–1985).
- Éamon de Buitléar, 83, Irish filmmaker.
- Harry L. Carrico, 96, American lawyer and state judge, Senior Justice of the Supreme Court of Virginia.
- Geoffrey Connard, 87, Australian politician, member of the Victorian Legislative Council (1982–1996).
- Joanne Conte, 79, American transgender politician.
- Gérard Dufresne, 94, Canadian politician and military officer.
- Lou Fitzgerald, 93, American professional baseball player, scout and manager.
- Chuck Hinton, 78, American baseball player (Washington Senators, Cleveland Indians, California Angels).
- M Sirajul Islam, 77, Bangladeshi politician.
- Stanley Karnow, 87, American journalist and Pulitzer Prize-winning (1990) historian, heart failure.
- John Makumbe, 63, Zimbabwean political scientist and activist.
- Barney Mussill, 93, American baseball player (Philadelphia Phillies).
- Phạm Duy, 91, Vietnamese songwriter.
- Sally Starr, 90, American actress (The Outlaws Is Coming) and television personality.

=== 28 ===
- Paul J. Achtemeier, 85, American biblical scholar.
- Brian Brown, 79, Australian jazz musician.
- Eddy Choong, 81, Malaysian badminton player.
- Émmanuel Ducher, 41, French Olympic water polo player.
- Trevor Elliott, 63, British geoscientist and professor.
- Florentino Fernández, 76, Cuban boxer, heart attack.
- Lonnie Goldstein, 94, American baseball player (Cincinnati Reds).
- Charlie Green, 80, Scottish amateur golfer.
- Hattie N. Harrison, 84, American politician, Member of the Maryland House of Delegates (since 1973).
- Bernard Horsfall, 82, British actor (Doctor Who, Gandhi, Braveheart).
- John Karlin, 94, South African industrial psychologist.
- Doug Kenna, 88, American football player.
- Oldřich Kulhánek, 72, Czech painter and graphic designer, designer of Czech banknotes and postage stamps.
- Michael D. Lett, 74, Grenadian politician, prostate cancer.
- Herbert Loebl, 89, British businessman and philanthropist.
- Keith Marsh, 86, English actor (Love Thy Neighbour).
- Dan Massey, 70, American sexual freedom activist.
- Victor Ntoni, 65, South African musician, heart attack.
- Mark Palmer, 71, American diplomat, United States Ambassador to Hungary (1986–1990).
- Ladislav Pavlovič, 86, Slovak footballer.
- Ceija Stojka, 79, Austrian Romani writer, painter, musician and Holocaust survivor.
- Earl Williams, 64, American baseball player (Atlanta Braves), leukemia.
- Huntington Williams Jr., 87, American suffragan bishop.
- Xu Liangying, 92, Chinese physicist, translator, historian and philosopher.
- Benedict Zilliacus, 92, Finnish writer.

=== 29 ===
- Ferris Ashton, 86, Australian rugby league player (Eastern Suburbs).
- Malcolm Brodie, 86, British sports journalist.
- Kenneth Clark, 90, English priest.
- Kerry Goulstone, 76, Welsh priest.
- Frank Hahn, 87, British economist (Hahn's Problem).
- Anselm Hollo, 78, Finnish poet and translator, pneumonia.
- William Ingram, 72–73, Welsh writer and actor.
- Reg Jenkins, 74, English footballer (Rochdale).
- Augusto César Leal Angulo, 81, Mexican politician and chemist, member of the Senate (2006–2012).
- Louis Lesser, 96, American businessman.
- Garrett Lewis, 77, American set decorator (Hook, Bram Stoker's Dracula, Glory).
- Jan Lužný, 86, Czech plant-breeder.
- Gordon H. Mansfield, 71, American military veteran, United States Deputy Secretary of Veterans Affairs.
- John Martinis, 82, American politician.
- Borislav Milošević, 78, Serbian diplomat, Yugoslav ambassador to Russia (1998–2000), heart-related problems.
- Butch Morris, 65, American jazz cornetist, conductor and composer, lung cancer.
- Said al-Muragha, 86, Palestinian militant (Fatah al-Intifada), cancer.
- László Nyers, 78, Hungarian Olympic wrestler.
- Arif Peçenek, 53, Turkish footballer (MKE Ankaragücü) and manager, heart attack.
- Hadiya Pendleton, 15, American student, shot.
- Johan de Ridder, 86, South African architect.
- Ferrol Sams, 90, American author and physician, natural causes.
- Reinhold Stecher, 91, Austrian Roman Catholic prelate, Bishop of Innsbruck (1980–1997).
- David Taylor, 78, British veterinarian and television personality (No. 73).
- John Young, 76–77, Australian cyclist.

=== 30 ===
- Herluf Andersen, 81, Danish Olympian.
- Patty Andrews, 94, American singer, last surviving member of The Andrews Sisters, natural causes.
- Alexandre Denguet Atiki, 76, Congolese politician.
- Gamal al-Banna, 92, Egyptian author and scholar, pneumonia.
- Frank Kell Cahoon, 78, American businessman and politician.
- José Cardona, 73, Honduran footballer, heart attack.
- Harvey Einbinder, 86, American physicist and author.
- Georg Gaertner, 92, German soldier and escapee.
- Shirley Luhtala, 79, American baseball player.
- Diane Marleau, 69, Canadian politician, MP for Sudbury (1988–2008) and government minister, colorectal cancer.
- Ann Rabson, 67, American blues singer and musician (Saffire – The Uppity Blues Women), cancer.
- Roger Raveel, 91, Belgian painter, pneumonia.
- Christopher Van Hollen Sr., 90, American diplomat, United States Ambassador to Sri Lanka and the Maldives (1972–1976), Alzheimer's disease.
- George Witt, 81, American baseball player (Pittsburgh Pirates, Los Angeles Angels, Houston Colt .45's).

=== 31 ===
- Rubén Bonifaz Nuño, 89, Mexican poet and classicist.
- Amina Cachalia, 82, South African activist and politician.
- Joseph Cassidy, 79, Irish Roman Catholic prelate, Archbishop of Tuam (1987–1994).
- R. Gilbert Clayton, 90, American set designer (Armageddon, Batman & Robin, The Untouchables).
- Nolan Frizzelle, 91, American politician, Member of the California State Assembly (1980–1992), heart failure.
- Hassan Habibi, 75, Iranian politician and scholar, Minister of Justice (1985–1989); First Vice President (1989–2001), heart attack.
- Sir Ron Hadfield, 73, British police officer, Chief Constable of West Midlands Police (1990–1996).
- Keith Joubert, 65, South African artist and conservationist.
- Larry Killick, 90, American basketball player.
- Bob Lacourse, 86, Canadian Olympic cyclist.
- Mohammad Mahseiri, Jordanian politician, Member of the House of Representatives (2013), heart attack.
- Brett Matthews, 50, South African cricketer, traffic collision.
- Caleb Moore, 25, American snowmobile competitor, complications from a collision during competition.
- Jacques Nguyễn Văn Mầu, 99, Vietnamese Roman Catholic prelate, Bishop of Vĩnh Long (1968–2001).
- Tony Pierce, 67, American baseball player (Kansas City/Oakland Athletics).
- Timir Pinegin, 85, Soviet sports sailor and Olympic gold medallist (1960).
- Edward Stankiewicz, 92, American linguist of Polish descent.
- Ingo Swann, 79, American parapsychologist.
- Shail Upadhya, 77, Nepalese United Nations disarmament official, fashion designer and socialite.
- Fred Whitfield, 75, American baseball player (Cleveland Indians).
- Diane Wolkstein, 70, American storyteller, during emergency heart surgery.
