= Alberghini =

Alberghini is an Italian surname. Notable people with the surname include:

- Chris Alberghini (born 1965), American television director and producer
- Delmo Alberghini, American runner
- Simone Alberghini (born 1973), Italian opera singer
- Tom Alberghini (1920–2013), American footballer
