= December 10 =

December 10 this year in various calendars
- Thursday, 10 December 2026
Akan	Kuruyaw
Armenian	23 Kʿaloch 1476
Aztec	Tozoztontli 9, 10 Ehēcatl
Babylonian	29 Arakhsamna, 2337 SE
Balinese pawukon	Luang, Pepet, Pasah, Menala, Umanis, Paniron, Wraspati of Gumbreg, Uma, Dangu, Duka
Bengali	25 Ogrohayon, BS 1433
Chinese	Yang Earth Horse・Horn Mansion; Fire Horse Year, Month 11, Day 2 (Daxue, 12 days until Dongzhi)
Common Era	10 December 2026 CE
Coptic	1 Koiak, AM 1743
Egyptian	28 Pharmuthi, 2775 NE
Ethiopian	1 Tākḫśāś, 2019 Amätä Məhrät
French Republican	Décade II, Nonidi de Frimaire de l'Année 235 de la République
Gregorian	10 December, AD 2026
Hebrew	30 Kislev, AM 5787
Hindu	Mūla・Śūla; Solar: 24 Mārgaśīrṣa, 1948 SE; Lunisolar: Adhika Pratipada, Śukla pakṣa of Mārgaśīrṣa, 2083 VE; Rāudra・5127 KY・1,872,919
Icelandic	Fimmtudagur, 18 Ýlir 2026
Islamic	29 Jumada al-thani, AH 1448 (using tabular method)
ISO week date	2026-W50-4
Japanese	2 Shimotsuki, Reiwa 8 (Taisetsu, 12 days until Tōji)
Julian	27 November, AD 2026 (AM 7535)
Julian day	2461385
Korean	2 Jwidal, 4359 DE
Maya	13.0.14.3.2; 15 Mac, 10 Ik
Roman	ante diem V Kalendas Decembres, MMDCCLXXIX AUC
Solar Hijri	19 Azar, SH 1405
Tibetan	2 mgo, me pho rta 2153 or 1772 or 1000

<<	December					>>
Su	Mo	Tu	We	Th	Fr	Sa
		1	2	3	4	5
6	7	8	9	10	11	12
13	14	15	16	17	18	19
20	21	22	23	24	25	26
27	28	29	30	31
2026

December 10 in recent years
2025 (Wednesday)
2024 (Tuesday)
2023 (Sunday)
2022 (Saturday)
2021 (Friday)
2020 (Thursday)
2019 (Tuesday)
2018 (Monday)
2017 (Sunday)
2016 (Saturday)

December 10 is the 344th day of the year (345th in leap years) in the Gregorian calendar; 21 days remain until the end of the year.

== Events ==
=== Pre-1600 ===
- 1317 – The Nyköping Banquet: Birger, King of Sweden treacherously seizes his two brothers, dukes Valdemar and Erik, who are subsequently starved to death in the dungeon of Nyköping Castle.
- 1508 – The League of Cambrai is formed by Pope Julius II, Louis XII of France, Maximilian I, Holy Roman Emperor and Ferdinand II of Aragon as an alliance against Venice.
- 1520 – Martin Luther burns his copy of the papal bull Exsurge Domine outside Wittenberg's Elster Gate.
- 1541 – Thomas Culpeper and Francis Dereham are executed for having affairs with Catherine Howard, Queen of England and wife of Henry VIII.

=== 1601–1900 ===
- 1652 – Defeat at the Battle of Dungeness causes the Commonwealth of England to reform its navy.
- 1665 – The Royal Netherlands Marine Corps is founded by Michiel de Ruyter.
- 1684 – Isaac Newton's derivation of Kepler's laws from his theory of gravity, contained in the paper De motu corporum in gyrum, is read to the Royal Society by Edmond Halley.
- 1768 – The first edition of the Encyclopædia Britannica is published.
- 1799 – France adopts the metre as its official unit of length.
- 1817 – Mississippi becomes the 20th U.S. state.
- 1861 – American Civil War: The Confederate States of America accept a rival state government's pronouncement that declares Kentucky to be the 12th state of the Confederacy.
- 1861 – Forces led by Nguyễn Trung Trực, an anti-colonial guerrilla leader in southern Vietnam, sink the French lorcha L'Esperance.
- 1864 – American Civil War: Sherman's March to the Sea: Major General William Tecumseh Sherman's Union Army troops reach the outer Confederate defenses of Savannah, Georgia.
- 1877 – Russo-Turkish War: The Russian Army captures Plevna after a 5-month siege. The garrison of 25,000 surviving Turks surrenders. The Russian victory is decisive for the outcome of the war and the Liberation of Bulgaria.
- 1896 – Alfred Jarry's Ubu Roi premieres in Paris. A riot breaks out at the end of the performance.
- 1898 – Spanish–American War: The Treaty of Paris is signed, officially ending the conflict. Spain cedes administration of Cuba to the United States, and the United States agrees to pay Spain $20 million for the Philippines.

=== 1901–present ===
- 1901 – The first Nobel Prize ceremony is held in Stockholm on the fifth anniversary of Alfred Nobel's death.
- 1902 – The opening of the reservoir of the Aswan Dam in Egypt.
- 1906 – U.S. President Theodore Roosevelt is awarded the Nobel Peace Prize for his role in the mediation of the Russo-Japanese War, becoming the first American to win a Nobel Prize in any field.
- 1907 – The worst night of the Brown Dog riots in London, when 1,000 medical students, protesting against the existence of a memorial for animals that have been vivisected, clash with 400 police officers.
- 1909 – Selma Lagerlöf becomes the first female writer to receive the Nobel Prize in Literature.
- 1932 – Thailand becomes a constitutional monarchy.
- 1936 – Abdication Crisis: Edward VIII signs the Instrument of Abdication.
- 1941 – World War II: The Royal Navy capital ships HMS Prince of Wales and HMS Repulse are sunk by Imperial Japanese Navy torpedo bombers near British Malaya.
- 1941 – World War II: Battle of the Philippines: Imperial Japanese forces under the command of General Masaharu Homma land on Luzon.
- 1942 – World War II: Government of Poland in exile send Raczyński's Note (the first official report on the Holocaust) to 26 governments who signed the Declaration by United Nations.
- 1948 – The Human Rights Convention is signed by the United Nations.
- 1949 – Chinese Civil War: The People's Liberation Army begins its siege of Chengdu, the last Kuomintang-held city in mainland China, forcing President of the Republic of China Chiang Kai-shek and his government to retreat to Taiwan.
- 1953 – British Prime Minister Winston Churchill receives the Nobel Prize in Literature.
- 1963 – Zanzibar gains independence from the United Kingdom as a constitutional monarchy, under Sultan Jamshid bin Abdullah.
- 1963 – An assassination attempt on the British High Commissioner in Aden kills two people and wounds dozens more.
- 1968 – Japan's biggest heist, the still-unsolved "300 million yen robbery", is carried out in Tokyo.
- 1978 – Arab–Israeli conflict: Prime Minister of Israel Menachem Begin and President of Egypt Anwar Sadat are jointly awarded the Nobel Peace Prize.
- 1979 – Kaohsiung Incident: Taiwanese pro-democracy demonstrations are suppressed by the KMT dictatorship, and organizers are arrested.
- 1983 – Democracy is restored in Argentina with the inauguration of President Raúl Alfonsín.
- 1984 – United Nations General Assembly recognizes the Convention against Torture.
- 1989 – Mongolian Revolution: At the country's first open pro-democracy public demonstration, Tsakhiagiin Elbegdorj announces the establishment of the Mongolian Democratic Union.
- 1991 – The Nagorno-Karabakh independence referendum is held, with 99.98% voting in favor of independence.
- 1991 – Nursultan Nazarbayev is sworn in as the 1st President of Kazakhstan.
- 1991 – The Kazakh Soviet Socialist Republic is renamed into the Republic of Kazakhstan.
- 1992 – Sheikh Zayed bin Sultan Al Nahyan establishes the Marriage Fund in the United Arab Emirates in response to rising wedding prices.
- 1993 – The last shift leaves Wearmouth Colliery in Sunderland. The closure of the 156-year-old pit marks the end of the old County Durham coalfield, which had been in operation since the Middle Ages.
- 1994 – Rwandan genocide: Maurice Baril, military advisor to the U.N. Secretary-General and head of the Military Division of the Department of Peacekeeping Operations, recommends that UNAMIR stand down.
- 1995 – The Israeli army withdraws from Nablus pursuant to the terms of Oslo Accord.
- 1996 – The new Constitution of South Africa is promulgated by Nelson Mandela.
- 1999 – Helen Clark is sworn in as Prime Minister of New Zealand, the second woman to hold the post and the first following an election.
- 2005 – Sosoliso Airlines Flight 1145 crashes at Port Harcourt International Airport in Nigeria, killing 108 people.
- 2014 – Palestinian minister Ziad Abu Ein is killed after the suppression of a demonstration by Israeli forces in the village (Turmus'ayya) in Ramallah.
- 2015 – Rojava conflict: The Syrian Democratic Council is established in Dêrik, forming the political wing of the Syrian Democratic Forces in northeast Syria.
- 2016 – Two explosions outside a football stadium in Istanbul, Turkey, kill 38 people and injure 166 others.
- 2017 – ISIL is defeated in Iraq.
- 2019 – The Ostrava hospital attack in the Czech Republic results in eight deaths, including the perpetrator.
- 2021 – A widespread, deadly, and violent tornado outbreak slams the Central, Midwestern, and Southern regions of the United States. Eighty-nine people are killed by the tornadoes, with most of the fatalities occurring in Kentucky, where a single tornado kills 57 people, and injures hundreds of others. Another tornado in Edwardsville, Illinois strikes an Amazon warehouse, killing six workers.

== Births ==
=== Pre-1600 ===
- 553 – Houzhu, emperor of the Chen dynasty (died 604)
- 1376 – Edmund Mortimer, English nobleman and rebel (died 1409)
- 1452 – Johannes Stöffler, German mathematician and astronomer (died 1531)
- 1472 – Anne de Mowbray, 8th Countess of Norfolk (died 1481)
- 1489 – Gaston of Foix, Duke of Nemours (died 1512)
- 1588 – Isaac Beeckman, Dutch scientist and philosopher (died 1637)

=== 1601–1900 ===
- 1610 – Adriaen van Ostade, Dutch painter (died 1685)
- 1654 – Giovanni Gioseffo dal Sole, Italian painter (died 1719)
- 1658 – Lancelot Blackburne, Archbishop of York (died 1743)
- 1713 – Johann Nicolaus Mempel, German cantor and organist (died 1747)
- 1751 – George Shaw, English botanist and zoologist (died 1813)
- 1776 – Archduchess Maria Leopoldine of Austria-Este (died 1848)
- 1783 – María Bibiana Benítez, Puerto Rican poet and playwright (died 1873)
- 1787 – Thomas Hopkins Gallaudet, American educator, founded the American School for the Deaf (died 1851)
- 1804 – Carl Gustav Jacob Jacobi, German mathematician and academic (died 1851)
- 1805 – William Lloyd Garrison, American journalist and activist, founded The Liberator (died 1879)
- 1805 – Joseph Škoda, Czech medical doctor, dermatologist and academic (died 1881)
- 1811 – Caroline Mehitable Fisher Sawyer, American poet, biographer, and editor (died 1894)
- 1815 – Ada Lovelace, English mathematician and computer scientist (died 1852)
- 1821 – Nikolay Nekrasov, Russian poet and critic (died 1877)
- 1822 – César Franck, Belgian organist and composer (died 1890)
- 1824 – George MacDonald, Scottish minister, author, and poet (died 1905)
- 1827 – Eugene O'Keefe, Canadian businessman and philanthropist (died 1913)
- 1830 – Emily Dickinson, American poet (died 1886)
- 1851 – Melvil Dewey, American librarian, created the Dewey Decimal System (died 1931)
- 1866 – Louis Bolk, Dutch anatomist and biologist (died 1930)
- 1870 – Jadunath Sarkar, Indian historian (died 1958)
- 1870 – Adolf Loos, Austrian architect and theoretician (died 1933)
- 1870 – Pierre Louÿs, Belgian-French author and poet (died 1925)
- 1878 – C. Rajagopalachari, Indian lawyer and politician, 45th Governor-General of India (died 1972)
- 1878 – Mohammad Ali Jauhar, Indian Muslim activist (died 1931)
- 1882 – Otto Neurath, Austrian sociologist and philosopher (died 1945)
- 1882 – Shigenori Tōgō, Japanese politician, 37th Japanese Minister for Foreign Affairs (died 1950)
- 1883 – Giovanni Messe, Italian field marshal and politician (died 1968)
- 1885 – Elizabeth Baker, American economist and academic (died 1973)
- 1885 – Marios Varvoglis, Greek composer and conductor (died 1967)
- 1886 – Victor McLaglen, English-American actor (died 1959)
- 1889 – Ray Collins, American actor (died 1965)
- 1890 – László Bárdossy, Hungarian politician and diplomat, 33rd Prime Minister of Hungary (died 1946)
- 1891 – Harold Alexander, 1st Earl Alexander of Tunis, English field marshal and politician, 17th Governor General of Canada (died 1969)
- 1891 – Arlie Mucks, American discus thrower and shot putter (died 1967)
- 1891 – Nelly Sachs, German-Swedish poet and playwright, Nobel Prize laureate (died 1970)
- 1896 – Torsten Bergström, Swedish actor and director (died 1948)

=== 1901–present ===
- 1903 – Una Merkel, American actress (died 1986)
- 1904 – Antonín Novotný, Czechoslovak politician, President of Czechoslovak Socialist Republic, General Secretary of the Communist Party of Czechoslovakia (died 1975)
- 1906 – Harold Adamson, American lyricist (died 1980)
- 1906 – Jules Ladoumègue, French runner (died 1973)
- 1907 – Rumer Godden, English author and poet (died 1998)
- 1907 – Lucien Laurent, French footballer and coach (died 2005)
- 1907 – Amedeo Nazzari, Italian actor (died 1979)
- 1908 – Olivier Messiaen, French composer and ornithologist (died 1992)
- 1909 – Hermes Pan, American dancer and choreographer (died 1990)
- 1910 – Ambrosio Padilla, Filipino basketball player and politician (died 1996)
- 1911 – Chet Huntley, American journalist (died 1974)
- 1912 – Philip Hart, American lawyer and politician, 49th Lieutenant Governor of Michigan (died 1976)
- 1912 – Tetsuji Takechi, Japanese theatrical and film director, critic, and author (died 1988)
- 1912 – René Toribio, Guadeloupean politician (died 1990)
- 1913 – Pannonica de Koenigswarter, English-American jazz patron and writer (died 1988)
- 1913 – Morton Gould, American pianist, composer, and conductor (died 1996)
- 1913 – Harry Locke, English actor (died 1987)
- 1913 – Ray Nance, American trumpeter, violinist, and singer (died 1976)
- 1914 – Dorothy Lamour, American actress and singer (died 1996)
- 1915 – Nicky Barr, Australian rugby player, soldier, and pilot (died 2006)
- 1916 – Walt Arfons, American race car driver (died 2013)
- 1918 – Anne Gwynne, American actress (died 2003)
- 1918 – Anatoli Tarasov, Russian ice hockey player and coach (died 1995)
- 1919 – Alexander Courage, American composer and conductor (died 2008)
- 1920 – Clarice Lispector, Ukrainian-Brazilian journalist and author (died 1977)
- 1920 – Reginald Rose, American screenwriter and producer (died 2002)
- 1921 – Toh Chin Chye, Singaporean academic and politician, 1st Deputy Prime Minister of Singapore (died 2012)
- 1922 – Agnes Nixon, American television writer and director (died 2016)
- 1923 – Harold Gould, American actor (died 2010)
- 1923 – Clorindo Testa, Italian-Argentinian architect, designed the National Library of the Argentine Republic and Marriott Plaza Hotel (died 2013)
- 1924 – Ken Albers, American singer and musician (died 2007)
- 1924 – Michael Manley, Jamaican pilot and politician, 4th Prime Minister of Jamaica (died 1997)
- 1925 – Carolyn Kizer, American poet and academic (died 2014)
- 1926 – Guitar Slim, American blues singer-songwriter and guitarist (died 1959)
- 1927 – Bob Farrell, American businessman, founded Farrell's Ice Cream Parlour (died 2015)
- 1927 – Danny Matt, German-Israeli general (died 2013)
- 1928 – Barbara Nichols, American actress (died 1976)
- 1930 – Wayne D. Anderson, American baseball player and coach (died 2013)
- 1930 – Ray Felix, American basketball player (died 1991)
- 1930 – Michael Jopling, Baron Jopling, English farmer and politician, Minister of Agriculture, Fisheries and Food
- 1931 – Peter Baker, English-South African footballer and manager (died 2016)
- 1933 – Philip R. Craig, American author (died 2007)
- 1933 – Mako Iwamatsu, Japanese actor (died 2006)
- 1934 – Howard Martin Temin, American geneticist and academic, Nobel Prize laureate (died 1994)
- 1935 – Terry Allcock, English footballer and cricketer (died 2024)
- 1935 – Jaromil Jireš, Czech director and screenwriter (died 2001)
- 1936 – Howard Smith, American journalist, director, and producer (died 2014)
- 1938 – Bill Dunk, Australian golfer
- 1938 – Yuri Temirkanov, Russian viola player and conductor (died 2023)
- 1939 – Dick Bavetta, American basketball player and referee
- 1939 – Barry Cunliffe, English archaeologist and academic
- 1941 – Ken Campbell, English actor, director, and screenwriter (died 2008)
- 1941 – Fionnula Flanagan, Irish actress and producer
- 1941 – Tommy Kirk, American actor (died 2021)
- 1941 – Tommy Rettig, American child actor (died 1996)
- 1941 – Kyu Sakamoto, Japanese singer and actor (died 1985)
- 1942 – Ann Gloag, Scottish nurse and businesswoman
- 1944 – Andris Bērziņš, Latvian businessman and politician, 8th President of Latvia
- 1944 – John Birt, Baron Birt, English businessman
- 1944 – Steve Renko, American baseball player
- 1945 – Mukhtar Altynbayev, Kazakhstani general and politician, 3rd Defence Minister of Kazakhstan
- 1946 – Douglas Kenney, American satirist (died 1980)
- 1947 – Rasul Guliyev, Azerbaijani engineer and politician, 22nd Speaker of the National Assembly of Azerbaijan
- 1948 – Dušan Bajević, Bosnian footballer and manager
- 1948 – Jessica Cleaves, American singer-songwriter (died 2014)
- 1948 – Jasuben Shilpi, Indian sculptor (died 2013)
- 1949 – Yasmin Alibhai-Brown, Ugandan-English journalist and author
- 1949 – David Perdue, American politician
- 1950 – John Boozman, American football player, lawyer, and politician
- 1950 – Simon Owen, New Zealand golfer
- 1951 – Johnny Rodriguez, American country music singer-songwriter and guitarist (died 2025)
- 1952 – Clive Anderson, English lawyer and television host
- 1952 – Susan Dey, American actress
- 1952 – Greg Mortimer, Australian geologist and mountaineer
- 1952 – Greg Laurie, American author and pastor
- 1952 – Paul Varul, Estonian lawyer and politician, 6th Estonian Minister of Justice
- 1953 – Chris Bury, American journalist and academic
- 1954 – Eudine Barriteau, Barbadian economist and academic
- 1954 – Price Cobb, American race car driver and manager
- 1954 – Jack Hues, English singer-songwriter and musician
- 1956 – Rod Blagojevich, American lawyer and politician, 40th Governor of Illinois
- 1956 – Roberto Cassinelli, Italian lawyer and politician
- 1956 – Jan van Dijk, Dutch footballer and manager
- 1957 – Michael Clarke Duncan, American actor (died 2012)
- 1957 – Paul Hardcastle, English composer and producer
- 1957 – Prem Rawat, Indian-American guru and educator
- 1958 – Cornelia Funke, German-American author
- 1958 – Kathryn Stott, English pianist and academic
- 1959 – Mark Aguirre, American basketball player and coach
- 1959 – Udi Aloni, American-Israeli director and author
- 1959 – Kevin Ash, English journalist and author (died 2013)
- 1959 – Wolf Hoffmann, German guitarist
- 1960 – Kenneth Branagh, British actor director, producer, and screenwriter
- 1960 – Kōichi Satō, Japanese actor
- 1961 – Mark McKoy, Canadian hurdler and sprinter
- 1961 – Nia Peeples, American singer and actress
- 1962 – Rakhat Aliyev, Kazakh politician and diplomat (died 2015)
- 1962 – John de Wolf, Dutch footballer and manager
- 1963 – Jahangir Khan, Pakistani squash player
- 1964 – Stephen Billington, English actor
- 1964 – Stef Blok, Dutch banker and politician, Dutch Minister of the Interior
- 1964 – Bobby Flay, American chef and author
- 1964 – Edith González, Mexican actress (died 2019)
- 1965 – Greg Giraldo, American lawyer, comedian, actor, and screenwriter (died 2010)
- 1965 – J Mascis, American singer-songwriter and guitarist
- 1965 – Stephanie Morgenstern, Swiss-Canadian actress, producer, and screenwriter
- 1966 – Rein Ahas, Estonian geographer and academic
- 1966 – Robin Brooke, New Zealand rugby player
- 1966 – Mel Rojas, Dominican baseball player
- 1966 – Penelope Trunk, American writer
- 1968 – Yōko Oginome, Japanese singer, actress, and voice actress
- 1969 – Darren Berry, Australian cricketer and coach
- 1969 – Rob Blake, Canadian ice hockey player and executive
- 1970 – Kevin Sharp, American singer-songwriter (died 2014)
- 1970 – Bryant Stith, American basketball player and coach
- 1972 – Donavon Frankenreiter, American surfer, singer-songwriter, and guitarist
- 1972 – Brian Molko, British-Belgian singer-songwriter
- 1973 – Rusty LaRue, American basketball player and coach
- 1973 – Gabriela Spanic, Venezuelan actress
- 1974 – Meg White, American drummer
- 1975 – Steve Bradley, American wrestler (died 2008)
- 1975 – Emmanuelle Chriqui, Canadian actress
- 1975 – Josip Skoko, Australian footballer
- 1976 – Shane Byrne, English motorcycle racer
- 1978 – Anna Jesień, Polish hurdler
- 1978 – Summer Phoenix, American actress
- 1979 – Matt Bentley, American wrestler
- 1979 – Iain Brunnschweiler, English cricketer
- 1979 – Yang Jianping, Chinese recurve archer
- 1980 – Sarah Chang, American violinist
- 1981 – Taufik Batisah, Singaporean singer
- 1981 – Rene Bourque, Canadian ice hockey player
- 1981 – Fábio Rochemback, Brazilian footballer
- 1982 – Claudia Hoffmann, German sprinter
- 1982 – Sultan Kösen, Turkish farmer, tallest living person
- 1983 – Patrick Flueger, American actor
- 1983 – Xavier Samuel, Australian actor
- 1984 – JTG, American wrestler
- 1985 – Charlie Adam, Scottish footballer
- 1985 – Roman Červenka, Czech ice hockey player
- 1985 – Matt Forte, American football player
- 1985 – Trésor Mputu, Congolese footballer
- 1985 – Raven-Symoné, American actress, singer, and dancer
- 1985 – Lê Công Vinh, Vietnamese footballer
- 1986 – Kahlil Bell, American football player
- 1987 – Gonzalo Higuaín, French-Argentinian footballer
- 1988 – Wilfried Bony, Ivorian footballer
- 1988 – Neven Subotić, Serbian footballer
- 1989 – Marion Maréchal-Le Pen, French politician
- 1989 – Tom Sexton, Australian-Irish rugby player
- 1990 – Kazenga LuaLua, Congolese-English footballer
- 1990 – Sakiko Matsui, Japanese singer and actress
- 1990 – Wil Myers, American baseball player
- 1990 – Teyana Taylor, American singer, songwriter, choreographer, and actress
- 1990 – Shoya Tomizawa, Japanese motorcycle racer (died 2010)
- 1991 – KiKi Layne, American actress
- 1991 – Eric Reid, American football player
- 1991 – Dion Waiters, American basketball player
- 1992 – Carlos Rodón, American baseball player
- 1992 – Melissa Roxburgh, Canadian-American actress
- 1994 – Richard Kennar, Samoan rugby league player
- 1994 – Matti Klinga, Finnish footballer
- 1995 – Tacko Fall, Senegalese basketball player
- 1996 – Joe Burrow, American football player
- 1996 – Kang Daniel, South Korean singer and entrepreneur
- 1997 – Viktoriia Savtsova, Ukrainian Paralympic swimmer
- 1998 – Lucia Bronzetti, Italian tennis player
- 1999 – Reiss Nelson, English footballer
- 2000 – Jeremie Frimpong, Dutch footballer
- 2001 – Coby Mayo, American professional baseball player
- 2005 – Ivan Demidov, Russian ice hockey player

== Deaths ==
=== Pre-1600 ===
- 925 – Sancho I, king of Pamplona
- 949 – Herman I, Duke of Swabia
- 990 – Folcmar, bishop of Utrecht
- 1041 – Michael IV the Paphlagonian, Byzantine emperor (born 1010)
- 1081 – Nikephoros III Botaneiates, deposed Byzantine Emperor (born c.1002)
- 1113 – Radwan, ruler of Aleppo
- 1310 – Stephen I, Duke of Bavaria (born 1271)
- 1454 – Ignatius Behnam Hadloyo, Syriac Orthodox Patriarch of Antioch.
- 1475 – Paolo Uccello, Italian painter (born 1397)
- 1508 – René II, Duke of Lorraine (born 1451)
- 1541 – Thomas Culpeper, English courtier (born 1514)
- 1541 – Francis Dereham, English courtier (born c. 1513)
- 1561 – Caspar Schwenckfeld, German theologian and writer

=== 1601–1900 ===
- 1618 – Giulio Caccini, Italian composer and educator (born 1551)
- 1626 – Edmund Gunter, English mathematician and academic (born 1581)
- 1665 – Tarquinio Merula, Italian organist, violinist, and composer (born 1594)
- 1736 – António Manoel de Vilhena, Portuguese soldier and politician (born 1663)
- 1791 – Jacob Frank, Polish religious leader (born 1726)
- 1831 – Thomas Johann Seebeck, German physicist and academic (born 1770)
- 1850 – Józef Bem, Polish general and physicist (born 1794)
- 1850 – François Sulpice Beudant, French mineralogist and geologist (born 1787)
- 1865 – Leopold I of Belgium (born 1790)
- 1867 – Sakamoto Ryōma, Japanese samurai and politician (born 1836)
- 1896 – Alfred Nobel, Swedish chemist and engineer, invented Dynamite and founded the Nobel Prize (born 1833)

=== 1901–present ===
- 1909 – Red Cloud, American tribal chief (of the Oglala nation) (born 1822)
- 1911 – Joseph Dalton Hooker, English botanist and explorer (born 1817)
- 1917 – Mackenzie Bowell, English-Canadian journalist and politician, 5th Prime Minister of Canada (born 1823)
- 1920 – Horace Elgin Dodge, American businessman, co-founded Dodge (born 1868)
- 1922 – Clement Lindley Wragge, English meteorologist and author (born 1852)
- 1926 – Nikola Pašić, Serbian politician, 46th Prime Minister of Serbia (born 1845)
- 1928 – Charles Rennie Mackintosh, Scottish architect and painter (born 1868)
- 1929 – Harry Crosby, American publisher and poet (born 1898)
- 1932 – Joseph Carruthers, Australian politician, 16th Premier of New South Wales (born 1857)
- 1936 – Bobby Abel, English cricketer (born 1857)
- 1936 – Luigi Pirandello, Italian dramatist, novelist, and poet Nobel Prize laureate (born 1867)
- 1939 – John Grieb, American gymnast and triathlete (born 1879)
- 1941 – Colin Kelly, American captain and pilot (born 1915)
- 1944 – John Brunt, English captain, Victoria Cross recipient (born 1922)
- 1945 – Theodor Dannecker, German captain (born 1913)
- 1946 – Walter Johnson, American baseball player, manager, and sportscaster (born 1887)
- 1946 – Damon Runyon, American newspaperman and short story writer (born 1884)
- 1948 – Na Hye-sok, South Korean journalist, poet, and painter (born 1896)
- 1951 – Algernon Blackwood, English author and playwright (born 1869)
- 1953 – Abdullah Yusuf Ali, Indian-English scholar and translator (born 1872)
- 1956 – David Shimoni, Russian-Israeli poet and translator (born 1891)
- 1957 – Napoleon Zervas, Greek general (born 1891)
- 1958 – Adolfo Camarillo, American horse breeder, rancher, and philanthropist (born 1864)
- 1963 – K. M. Panikkar, Indian historian and diplomat (born 1894)
- 1967 – Otis Redding, American singer-songwriter and producer (born 1941)
- 1968 – Karl Barth, Swiss theologian and author (born 1886)
- 1968 – George Forrest, Northern Irish lawyer and politician (born 1921)
- 1968 – Thomas Merton, American monk and author (born 1915)
- 1970 – Chen Qiyou, Chinese politician and revolutionary (born 1892)
- 1972 – Mark Van Doren, American poet, critic, and academic (born 1894)
- 1973 – Wolf V. Vishniac, German-American microbiologist and academic (born 1922)
- 1974 – Toshinari Shōji, Japanese general (born 1890)
- 1977 – Adolph Rupp, American basketball player and coach (born 1901)
- 1978 – Ed Wood, American director, producer, and screenwriter (born 1924)
- 1979 – Ann Dvorak, American actress (born 1911)
- 1982 – Freeman Gosden, American actor and screenwriter (born 1899)
- 1987 – Jascha Heifetz, Lithuanian-American violinist and educator (born 1901)
- 1988 – Richard S. Castellano, American actor (born 1933)
- 1988 – Johnny Lawrence, English cricketer and coach (born 1911)
- 1988 – Dorothy de Rothschild, English philanthropist and activist (born 1895)
- 1990 – Armand Hammer, American businessman, founded Occidental Petroleum (born 1898)
- 1991 – Greta Kempton, Austrian-American painter and academic (born 1901)
- 1992 – Dan Maskell, English tennis player and sportscaster (born 1908)
- 1993 – Alice Tully, American soprano (born 1902)
- 1994 – Keith Joseph, English lawyer and politician, Secretary of State for Education (born 1918)
- 1994 – Alex Wilson, Canadian-American sprinter (born 1905)
- 1995 – Darren Robinson, American rapper (born 1967)
- 1996 – Faron Young, American singer-songwriter, guitarist, and actor (born 1932)
- 1999 – Rick Danko, Canadian singer-songwriter, bass player, and producer (born 1943)
- 1999 – Franjo Tuđman, Croatian general and politician, 1st President of Croatia (born 1922)
- 1999 – Woodrow Borah, American historian of Spanish America (born 1912)
- 2000 – Marie Windsor, American actress (born 1919)
- 2001 – Ashok Kumar, Indian actor, singer, and producer (born 1911)
- 2002 – Andres Küng, Swedish journalist and politician (born 1945)
- 2002 – Ian MacNaughton, Scottish actor, director, and producer (born 1925)
- 2003 – Sean McClory, Irish actor and director (born 1924)
- 2004 – Gary Webb, American journalist and author (born 1955)
- 2005 – Mary Jackson, American actress (born 1910)
- 2005 – Eugene McCarthy, American poet, academic, and politician (born 1916)
- 2005 – Richard Pryor, American comedian, actor, producer, and screenwriter (born 1940)
- 2006 – Olivia Coolidge, English-American author and educator (born 1908)
- 2006 – Augusto Pinochet, Chilean general and dictator, 30th President of Chile (born 1915)
- 2007 – Vitali Hakko, Turkish businessman, founded Vakko (born 1913)
- 2009 – Vladimir Teplyakov, Russian soldier and physicist (born 1925)
- 2010 – John Fenn, American chemist and academic, Nobel Prize laureate (born 1917)
- 2010 – J. Michael Hagopian, Armenian-American director, producer, and screenwriter (born 1913)
- 2010 – MacKenzie Miller, American horse trainer and breeder (born 1921)
- 2012 – Iajuddin Ahmed, Bangladeshi academic and politician, 13th President of Bangladesh (born 1931)
- 2012 – Antonio Cubillo, Spanish lawyer and politician (born 1930)
- 2012 – Tommy Roberts, English fashion designer (born 1942)
- 2013 – Alan Coleman, English-Australian director, producer, and screenwriter (born 1936)
- 2013 – Jim Hall, American guitarist and composer (born 1930)
- 2013 – Don Lund, American baseball player and coach (born 1923)
- 2013 – Srikanta Wadiyar, Indian politician and the titular Maharaja of Mysore(born 1946)
- 2014 – Ralph Giordano, German author and publicist (born 1923)
- 2014 – Robert B. Oakley, American diplomat, 19th United States Ambassador to Pakistan (born 1931)
- 2014 – Bob Solinger, Canadian ice hockey player (born 1925)
- 2014 – Judy Baar Topinka, American journalist and politician (born 1944)
- 2014 – Gerard Vianen, Dutch cyclist (born 1944)
- 2015 – Ron Bouchard, American race car driver and businessman (born 1948)
- 2015 – Denis Héroux, Canadian director and producer (born 1940)
- 2015 – Arnold Peralta, Honduran footballer (born 1989)
- 2015 – Dolph Schayes, American basketball player and coach (born 1928)
- 2017 – Bruce Brown, American filmmaker (born 1937)
- 2017 – Max Clifford, British publicist (born 1943)
- 2017 – Charles M. Green Jr., American Internet personality (born 1950)
- 2017 – Curtis W. Harris, American minister (born 1924)
- 2019 – Philip McKeon, American actor (born 1964)
- 2019 – Gershon Kingsley, American composer and musician (born 1922)
- 2019 – Emily Mason, American painter (born 1932)
- 2020 – Tommy "Tiny" Lister Jr., American actor and wrestler (born 1958)
- 2020 – Joseph Safra, Lebanese-Brazilian financier (born 1938)
- 2020 – Carol Sutton, American actress (born 1944)
- 2020 – Barbara Windsor, English actress (born 1937)
- 2021 – Michael Nesmith, American musician (The Monkees), songwriter, actor, producer, and novelist (born 1942)
- 2023 – Julian Carroll, American politician, 54th Governor of Kentucky (born 1931)
- 2024 – Rocky Colavito, American baseball player and sportscaster (born 1933)
- 2024 – Michael Cole, American actor (born 1940)
- 2024 – Kreskin, American mentalist (born 1935)
- 2024 – S. M. Krishna, Indian politician and statesman, Minister of External Affairs, 10th Chief Minister of Karnataka, 19th Governor of Maharashtra (born 1932)
- 2025 – Jeffery Garcia, American stand-up comedian and voice actor (born 1975)

== Holidays and observances ==
- Alfred Nobel Day or Nobeldagen (Sweden)
- Christian feast day:
  - Behnam, Sarah, and the Forty Martyrs (Syriac Orthodox Church)
  - Eulalia of Mérida
  - Gregory III
  - Karl Barth (Episcopal Church (USA))
  - Polydore Plasden
  - Thomas Merton (Episcopal Church (USA))
  - Translation of the Holy House of Loreto
  - December 10 (Eastern Orthodox liturgics)
- Constitution Day (Thailand)
- Human Rights Day (International)
