= Issawi =

The word Issawi or Issaoui can refer to:

== Politics ==
- Arab tribes in Iraq

== People ==
- Abu Yasser al-Issawi
- Charles Issawi
- Eifan Saadoun Al Issawi, Iraqi politician
- Omar Al Issawi
- Rafi al-Issawi
- Safa Issaoui, Tunisian track runner
- Salim Issawi, one of the hijackers of TWA Flight 840 (1969)
