= Joseph Roney =

Haitian politician (1935–2013)

Joseph Roney (August 15, 1935, in Port-au-Prince – January 7, 2013, in Brussels) was a Haitian politician. Roney hailed from a peasant family. He studied at the Ecole normale supérieure of the State University of Haiti.

In 1959 he took part in founding the Party of Popular Accord (PEP), a party in which he would serve as its general secretary. During the 1960s he was a leader of the National Union of Haitian Students (UNEH) and the Popular Youth League (LJP). Roney organized students strike to ensure the freedom of jailed UNEH chairman Bastien. Soon, Roney himself was jailed as well. On November 22, 1960, a national students strike was organized to demand that Roney (then the UNEH treasurer) and 19 other students be freed from jail. The strike movement was successful, and Roney resumed a leading role in the student movement after his release.

In 1969 he became the general secretary of the Unified Party of Haitian Communists (PUCH). He continued in this position until 1972. Soon after the foundation of the PUCH, Roney was arrested and jailed for seven years. He was released from jailed in 1977, and went into exile in Belgium. In Belgium, he became a member of the Workers' Party of Belgium.
