= Kevin Ashley (rugby league) =

Australian rugby league player

Personal information
- Born: 6 July 1941
- Died: 24 January 2013 (aged 71)

Playing information
- Position: Second-row, hooker
Club
Years	Team	Pld	T	G	FG	P
1963–69	Eastern Suburbs	107	5	48	25	161
Representative
Years	Team	Pld	T	G	FG	P
1967	NSW City Firsts	1	0	0	0	0

Kevin Ashley (6 July 1941 – 24 January 2013) was an Australian professional rugby league player. Primarily a second-row forward, he also played at hooker. He made 107 appearances for the Eastern Suburbs between 1963 and 1969, scoring five tries, converting 48 goals and scoring a club record 25 field goals. In 1967, the Paddington-raised Ashley represented NSW City Firsts against Country.

Ashley died on 24 January 2013 at the age of 71.
