= Percy White (nuclear scientist) =

Percival A.F. White OBE
- Born: Percival Albert Frederick White; 16 July 1916; London, England
- Died: 8 January 2013 (aged 96)
- Education: University College, Swansea; University College London
- Occupations: Chemist; Metallurgist; Nuclear scientist
- Known for: Nuclear weapons development and advocacy of civilian nuclear technology

Percival Albert Frederick White OBE (16 July 1916 – 8 January 2013) was a British chemist, metallurgist and nuclear scientist who was involved in the creation and testing of Britain's first nuclear weapon during Operation Hurricane in 1952. He also made significant contributions to the advancement of explosives manufacturing, chemical engineering and civilian nuclear technology, and authored numerous books on engineering.

== Early life and education ==
White was born in London in 1916 and moved to South Wales at an early age. He studied chemistry at University College, Swansea, graduating in 1936 at the age of 19 with first-class honours. He went on to study chemical engineering at University College London, and then began a career in industrial metallurgy.

== Second World War ==
During the Second World War, White worked for the British government as a specialist in ammunition and chemical warfare. While working for the Royal Ordnance Factories, he patented a method of efficiently manufacturing high explosive shells. After the war, White worked in military research at the Defence Research Establishments at Waltham Abbey and Porton Down, before moving to the Woolwich Arsenal.

== Nuclear weapons research and later career ==
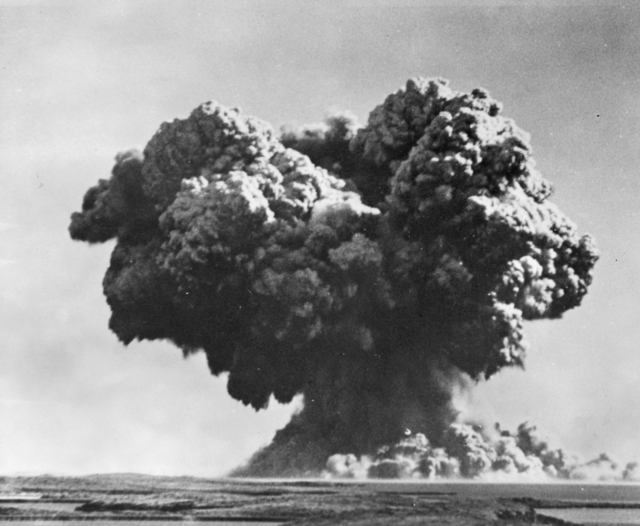
The mushroom cloud produced by the Operation Hurricane nuclear test on 3 October 1952.

In 1949, White joined the secret High Explosives Research (HER) project, which was tasked by Lord William Penney with producing Britain's first nuclear bomb. In 1950, HER was moved to Aldermaston, where White served as the chief chemical engineer and helped create a crucial radioactive liquid treatment plant. The HER project culminated in the successful Operation Hurricane, Britain's first nuclear test, on 3 October 1952.

Thereafter, White continued to work in nuclear science, collaborating with American researchers and contributing to the development of the Dounreay civilian nuclear reactor. He was appointed OBE in 1966, and retired in 1972, though he continued to advise the British government and private companies on the use of chemical engineering and nuclear technology. He also authored a number of books on chemical engineering and air filtration.

== Personal life ==
White married Jean Bracey in 1940; they had two children, and remained married until her death in 2007. At the time of White's death in 2013, he had two children, four grandchildren and six great-grandchildren. White was a keen amateur artist, training as an enameller at Southampton College of Art in his retirement, and exhibiting his artworks in London and Winchester.

== See also ==
- Nuclear weapons and the United Kingdom
