= Paul Droubay =

- Born: September 11, 1926
- Died: January 14, 2013 (aged 86)
- Education: University of Utah
- Occupation: Radio personality

Paul Droubay (11 September 1926 – 14 January 2013) was an American radio broadcaster located in Utah. Droubay attended East High School in Salt Lake City, and graduated from the University of Utah. Shortly after graduation from high school, he served as an engineer based in the Philippines during World War II. He began his broadcasting career during the 1960s as an on-air personality in southern Idaho and the Salt Lake City market, eventually doing Utah Stars basketball color commentary alongside Bill Marcroft in the early 1970s. He co-owned KSXX and KDAB with Starley Bush, and the eventual breakup of their business association left Droubay as sole owner of KDAB. He was instrumental in the successful petitioning of the Federal Communications Commission in 1979 to eliminate the requirement that a broadcast signal originate from the city of that station's license, changing broadcasting on a national level. He retired in 1987 after the successful sale of KDAB to Albimar Communications and resided in Phoenix, Arizona until his death. Droubay is survived by his wife June Greer Droubay and three children, Greg, Mike and Don.
