= Nadeane Walker =

American journalist, correspondent and editor

Nadeane Walker Anderson
- Born: 1921; Canton, Texas, U.S.
- Died: 2013 (aged 91–92)
- Education: University of North Texas
- Occupations: Journalist; foreign correspondent; fashion editor

Nadeane Walker Anderson, known professionally by her maiden name Nadeane Walker, (1921 – January 7, 2013) was an American journalist, foreign correspondent and former fashion editor for the Associated Press.

== Early life ==
Walker was born in 1921 on a family farm in Canton, Texas, the second youngest of nine children of Charles H. Walker and Wincie Sides Walker. She graduated in 1942 from North Texas Teacher's College, which is now the present-day University of North Texas.

== Career ==
While working for the Fort Worth Star-Telegram as a staff writer following college, her editors sent her to cover a story on the Women's Army Corps (WAC), the women's branch of the United States Army during World War II. The story changed Walker's career, as she enlisted in the Women's Army Corps soon after covering the corps. Through the WAC, Walker was posted to Europe, where she joined the staff of Stars and Stripes newspaper's Paris edition as a reporter in 1945.

She married Godfrey Anderson, a World War II correspondent for the Associated Press (AP), at a ceremony in Frankfurt, Germany, on October 4, 1946. The couple lived in Germany, Belgium and Sweden before moving to Paris, France. She joined the AP as the news service's European fashion editor, based from Paris. She interviewed some of the largest figures in fashion during post-war period, including Christian Dior and Coco Chanel. Designer Yves Lanvin of the fashion house, Lanvin, named one of his dresses for Nadeane Walker. Walker worked as a London correspondent for the International Herald Tribune and a freelance reporter for numerous other newspapers and magazines after leaving the AP.

Walker moved back to her native Texas in 1970 and took a position as a reporter for the Dallas Times Herald. However, the United States Department of Labor launched an investigation into both gender discrimination and age discrimination at the Dallas Times Herald. Walker cooperated with the Department of Labor's probe and was subsequently fired by the newspaper. She joined a lawsuit filed by the Department of Labor in 1981; the suit led to a change of employment procedures at the Dallas Times-Herald. Walker continued to work as a freelance writer for the next two decades.

== Later life ==
Walker moved to Austin, Texas, with her daughter after the death of her husband in 1999. She died in Austin of natural causes on January 7, 2013, at the age of 91. She was survived by her daughter, Jane Fredrick, and son, David Anderson.
