= Ismail al-Armouti =

Jordanian politician

Ismail Nazzal al-Armouti (died 23 January 2013) was a Jordanian politician. He served as Minister in several governments. One of those ministerships was as Minister of Municipal and Rural Affairs in 1976.
