= Michel Pollien =

- Auxiliary bishop of Paris
- Church: Roman Catholic Church
- See: Roman Catholic Archdiocese of Paris

Orders
- Ordination: 25 June 1966
- Consecration: 11 October 1996

Personal details
- Born: 22 August 1937 Paris, France
- Died: 15 January 2013 (aged 75) Paris, France

Michel Pollien (22 August 1937 − 15 January 2013) was a French Roman Catholic bishop.

Ordained to the priesthood in 1966, Pollien was appointed titular bishop of Pulceriopolis and auxiliary bishop of the Roman Catholic Archdiocese of Paris, France and retired in 2012.
