= Augusto César Leal Angulo =

Mexican chemist and politician

- Born: 3 June 1931; Badiraguato, Sinaloa, Mexico
- Died: 29 January 2013 (aged 81); Mexico City, Mexico
- Education: IPN
- Occupations: Deputy and Senator
- Political party: PAN

Augusto César Leal Angulo (3 June 1931 – 29 January 2013) was a Mexican chemist and politician affiliated with the PAN. He served as Senator of the LX and LXI Legislatures of the Mexican Congress representing Sinaloa. He also served as Deputy between 1994 and 1997.
