= Mohammad Aeltemesh =

Indian lawyer (1948–2023)

Coordinates: 21°10′41.08″N 81°23′21.95″E

- Born: 4 August 1948; Hazari Bagh, Bihar
- Died: 4 January 2013 (aged 64); New Delhi
- Resting place: New Delhi
- Website: reinlawconsultants.page.tl

Mohammad Aeltemesh Rein was an Indian lawyer who practised before the Supreme Court of India from 1978 until the early 2000s.

"A lawyer once enrolled under the Advocates Act, may practice throughout India." This contention was raised by him before the Honourable Supreme Court of India upon which the Government was asked to notify section 30 of the Advocates Act. It took the government more than a decade to notify Section 30 of the Advocates Act.

== Career ==
In 1982 he established his Law firm Aeltemesh Rein & Co. Law Consultants.
