= Morné van der Merwe =

South African rugby union player

- Born: Morné van der Merwe; 28 March 1973 South Africa
- Died: 18 January 2013 (aged 39) South Africa

Rugby union career
- Position: loosehead prop
Provincial / State sides
Years	Team	Apps	(Points)
1996–1999	EP Kings	63	(75)
2000–2001	Wellington		
2000–2004	W Province	28	
Super Rugby
Years	Team	Apps	(Points)
2001	Stormers	11	

Morné van der Merwe (28 March 1973 – 18 January 2013) was a South African rugby union player. His regular playing position was loosehead prop. He played for the Stormers in Super Rugby and the Eastern and Western Provinces in the Currie Cup. He also played for the Wellington Lions in New Zealand. Van der Merwe died on 18 January 2013 after a battle with brain cancer.
