= Kishore Pawar =

Indian trade union leader and politician

Kishore Pawar (c. 1926 – 2 January 2013) was an Indian trade union leader and politician.

== Life ==
Pawar was close to Jayaprakash Narayan. He is known for his strong commitment to social causes and trade union issues, having participated in the Hyderabad and Goa freedom struggles as well as the Samyukta Maharashtra movement.

He organized and led workers and sugarcane growers in the sugar cooperative sector of western Maharashtra.

He died on 2 January 2013 in hospital at age 86.
