= Zhang Wenbin (vice minister) =

Vice Minister of Petroleum of China

- 张文彬

Vice Minister of the Petroleum Industry
- In office March 1965 – July 1987

Personal details
- Born: March 1, 1919 Dai County, Shanxi, Republic of China
- Died: January 1, 2013 (aged 93) Beijing, China
- Party: Chinese Communist Party
- Occupation: Revolutionary; politician; petroleum administrator

Zhang Wenbin (Chinese: 张文彬; March 1919 – 1 January 2013) was a Chinese Communist revolutionary and politician. He fought in the Second Sino-Japanese War and Chinese Civil War, and served as Political Commissar of the 57th Division of the People's Liberation Army. After the founding of the People's Republic of China, he worked in the oil industry and took leadership positions in oil fields in Xinjiang, Heilongjiang, and Shandong. He served as Vice Minister of the Petroleum Industry from 1965 to 1987.

== Biography ==
Zhang was born in March 1919 in Dai County, Shanxi, Republic of China. He joined the Chinese Communist Party (CCP) in August 1937, and fought as a member of the Taiyue Column (太岳纵队) during the Second Sino-Japanese War. In the ensuing Chinese Civil War, he served as Political Commissar of the 54th, 72nd, and 36th regiments of the People's Liberation Army, and later Commissar of the 57th Division of the 19th Army.

After the CCP won the civil war and established the People's Republic of China in 1949, Zhang worked in the petroleum industry and served as General Manager of Xinjiang Petroleum Company. He then took leadership positions at the Daqing Oil Field in Heilongjiang and the Shengli Oil Field in Shandong. From March 1965, he served as Vice Minister of the Petroleum Industry until his retirement in July 1987.

Zhang died in Beijing on 1 January 2013, at the age of 93.
