= Matilde Lindo =

Nicaraguan feminist

Matilde Lindo Crisanto
- Born: 7 June 1954; Puerto Cabezas
- Died: January 20, 2013 (aged 58); Managua
- Occupation: Activist

Matilde Lindo Crisanto (7 June 1954 – 20 January 2013) was a Nicaraguan feminist and activist.

== Biography ==
Matilde Lindo Crisanto was born on 7 June 1954 in Puerto Cabezas, North Caribbean Coast Autonomous Region, Nicaragua, the second of three children (two daughters and a son). Her parents were Harold Lindo, a Creole, and Imogene Crisanto, a Miskito, making her a Garifuna. Though Creole English was her native tongue, she could speak Spanish and some Miskito. After finishing high school, she entered the normal school in Wapsum to become a teacher. Upon graduation, she began work in rural Miskit and Sumo people. She would attend University of the Autonomous Regions of the Nicaraguan Caribbean Coast for a degree in Law but would not complete this degree. In 1976, she traveled to Cuba for a two-year sociology course.

In 1979, Lindo moved to Bilwi to work as a teacher for the Ministry of the Environment and Natural Resources and became a community leader through the Moravian Church. A decade later in 1889, she began to become involved in Feminism and participated a meeting about gender and attended the first cycle of feminist training. She shortly became one of the outstanding members of the Women's movement on the Caribbean coast. In September 1995, she participated in the Fourth World Conference on Women in Beijing. Lindo was part of the Women's Network Against Violence and in 2003 moved to Managua to join its Coordinating Commission.

On 13 January 2013, at the age of 59, Matilde died of a heart attack in Managua.
