= Charly Jacobs =

Belgian footballer

Personal information
- Date of birth: 21 July 1948
- Date of death: 9 January 2013 (aged 64)

International career
Years	Team	Apps	(Gls)
1979	Belgium	1	(0)

Charly Jacobs (21 July 1948 – 9 January 2013) was a Belgian footballer. He played for Sporting Charleroi for 10 years. He also played in one match for the Belgium national football team in 1979.
