= Paul Taff =

Paul Kenneth Taff
- Born: January 21, 1920; Belleville, Illinois
- Died: January 3, 2013 (aged 92)
- Occupations: television executive, executive producer, television producer

Paul Kenneth Taff (January 21, 1920 in Belleville, Illinois – January 3, 2013) was an American television executive, executive producer, and television producer. His credits included Mister Rogers' Neighborhood. Taff spearheaded the funding for Julia Child's first cooking show, The French Chef, which allowed the show to be aired nationwide and launched Child's television career.

Taff had an over 70-year career in broadcasting. His career started during his college years as a control room operator and occasional announcer on WSOY radio in Decatur, Illinois. That beginning was followed by positions as continuity director and assistant program director at KFUO radio, St. Louis; program director at WBEZ radio, Chicago; program director at WTVP television, Decatur, Illinois; station manager at WMVS, an educational television station in Milwaukee, Wisconsin; director of children’s programs and director of program operations, National Educational Television (NET), New York City, the predecessor to the Public Broadcasting Service (PBS); president and general manager of Connecticut Educational Telecommunications Company, Hartford, Connecticut, which subsequently became Connecticut Public Broadcasting; and executive director, president and president emeritus of the Connecticut Broadcasters Association.

Taff graduated from Belleville High School and from Millikin University. He later received a master's degree in speech from Northwestern University and an honorary doctorate of humane letters from the University of New Haven.

Taff became the first television broadcaster to appear on WTVP (now WAND) in 1953, In Decatur, Illinois.

As Director of Children's Programs for National Educational Television, he helped to secure funding to acquire the broadcasting rights for Mister Rogers' Neighborhood. and bring it to a national television audience.

A resident of Glastonbury, Connecticut, Taff died on January 3, 2013, at the age of 92.
