= Zakiah Daradjat =

Indonesian Islamic psychologist (1926–2013)

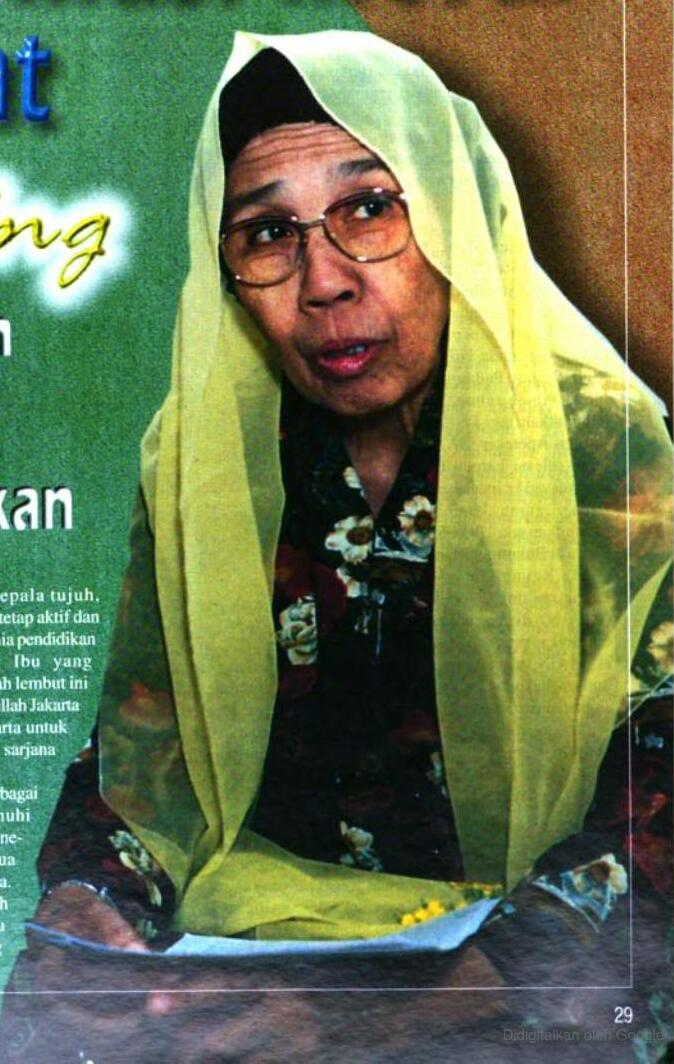
Zakiah Daradjat, 1998

Zakiah Daradjat (November 6, 1926 – January 15, 2013) was an Indonesian Islamic psychologist, educator, and professor of psychology at the Syarif Hidayatullah State Islamic University Jakarta.

== Early life ==
Zakiah Daradjat was born in Koto Marapak, Agam, Dutch East Indies, on 6 November 1926. Her father, Daradjat Husain was known as an activist in the Muslim organization Muhammadiyah and her mother, Rafi'ah was active in Sarekat Islam. Husain had two wives; there were six children he got from his first wife, and from his second wife, Rasunah, he got five children, Zakiah being the oldest. Even though her parents did not come from an ulema group, as a child Zakiah had been educated about Islam through her parents.
