= William Maxson =

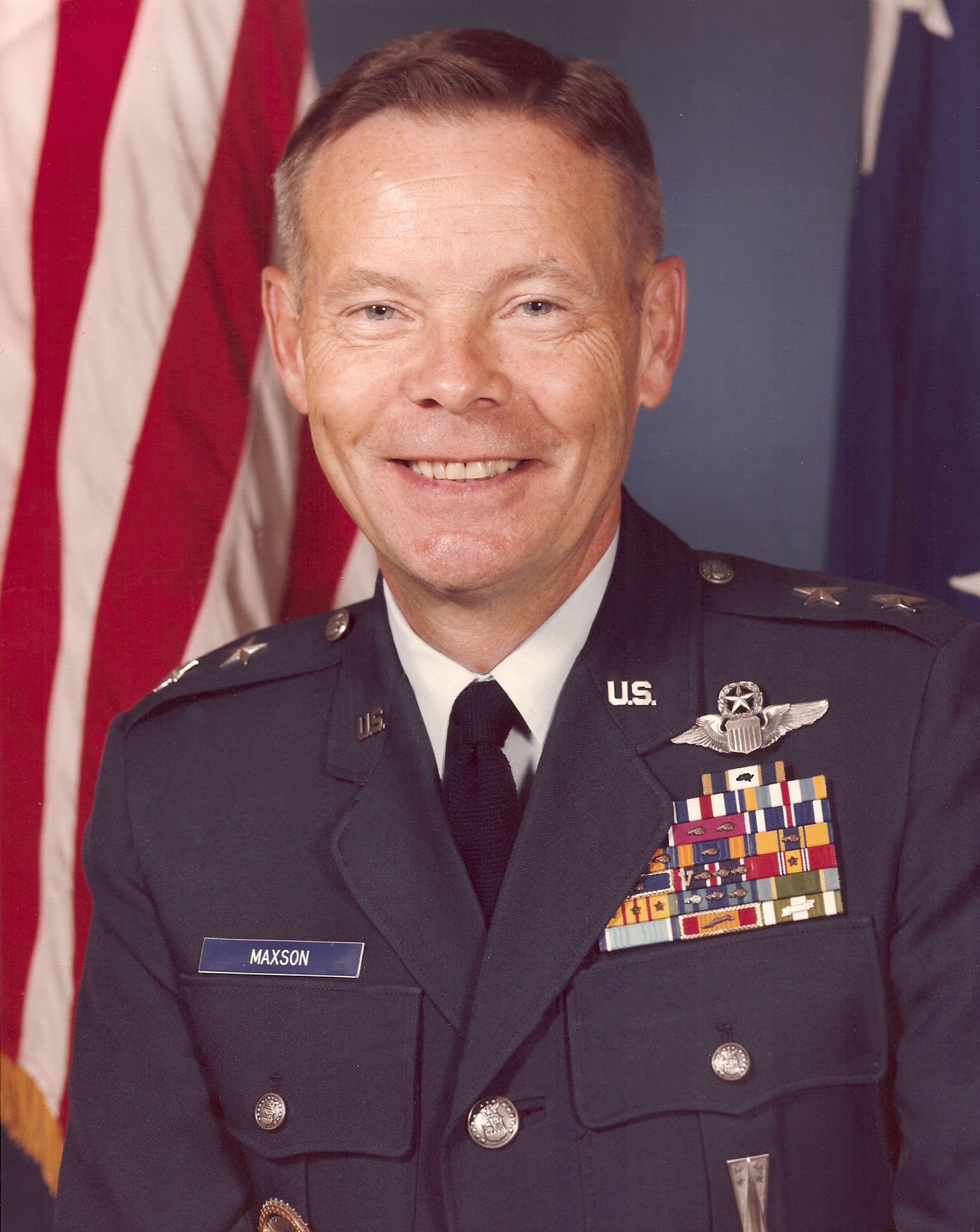
- Born: 4 September 1930; Akron, Ohio
- Died: 3 January 2013 (aged 82); Jacksonville, Florida
- Military career
- Allegiance: United States
- Rank: Major general
- Commands: Vice Commander, 15th Air Force, Strategic Air Command,

William B. Maxson (4 September 1930 – 3 January 2013) was an American Air Force Major General and vice commander, 15th Air Force, Strategic Air Command, March Air Force Base, Calif.

Maxson was born in Ohio. He fought in the Vietnam War and completed over 270 objectives. Maxson was awarded the Silver Star Medal, two AFDs, three Legions of Merit, DSS and the DFC medal including around 15 more Air Force medal awards. Maxson left the Army in 1984.

Maxson died in Jacksonville, aged 82, survived by his wife Nancy, daughter Suzanne Maltz, son Robert Maxson who was a former American military captain, and four grandsons and two granddaughters.
