= Wolfgang Ilgenfritz =

Austrian politician

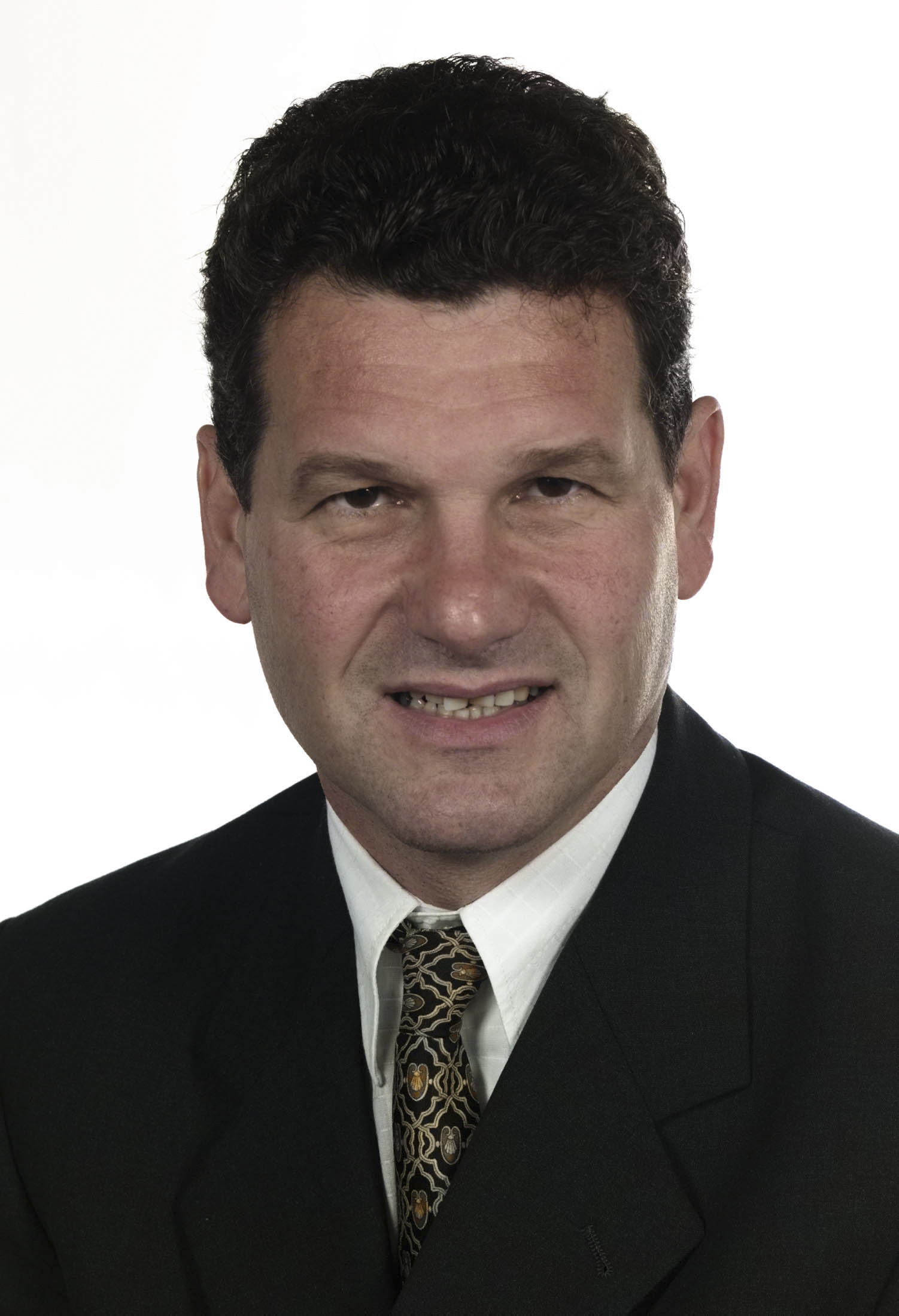
- Ilgenfritz in 1999

Member of the European Parliament for Austria
- In office 20 July 1999 – 19 July 2004
- Succeeded by: Various Austrian members

Personal details
- Born: 10 January 1957 Villach, Austria
- Died: 18 January 2013 (aged 56) Villach, Austria
- Party: Freedom Party of Austria

Wolfgang Ilgenfritz (10 January 1957; Villach, Austria – 18 January 2013; Villach) was an Austrian politician and most notably a non-attached Member of the European Parliament. He served for one parliamentary term (20 July 1999 – 19 July 2004) and was a member of the Freedom Party of Austria.

== Early life ==
Wolfgang Ilgenfritz was born on 10 January 1957 in Villach, Austria. Attending a local primary school from 1963 to 1967, Ilgenfritz began attending another Villach school in 1967, graduating from there in 1971. Until 1976, Ilgenfritz studied at a local business school, continuing his education in business administration at the University of Graz until 1981. After receiving his qualifications, Ilgenfritz worked for one of the largest tax firms in Carinthia from 1981 to 1986, until opting to become an independent tax advisor from 1986 to 1991. From 1991 Ilgenfritz was an independent auditor and tax consultant, becoming a member of the Day Chamber of Chartered Accountants Carinthia in 1993.

On 20 July 1999 Ilgenfritz became a Member of the European Parliament, representing his home country of Austria. A one-term member, he served on various committees and delegations during his parliamentary career, including the Committee on Budgets, the Delegation for relations with Switzerland, Iceland and Norway and the Delegation to the EU-Hungary Joint Parliamentary Committee. He also served as a substitute on the Committee on the Environment, Public Health and Consumer Policy and the Committee on Culture, Youth, Education, the Media and Sport. On 19 July 2004 Ilgenfritz' term ended, and his European Parliamentary career came to a close.

In 2001, Ilgenfritz was one of several Members of European Parliament to declare their personal financial interests on their personal parliamentary websites as part of a campaign led by the European Voice.
