= Michael Triplett =

American journalist

Michael Triplett (April 20, 1964, St. Louis, Missouri - January 17, 2013, Madison, Alabama) was an American journalist and president of the National Lesbian and Gay Journalists Association from August 2012 until his death. Most recently, Triplett had worked for the Daily Tax Report for Bloomberg BNA, as an assistant managing editor.

He was born in St. Louis and graduated from University of Missouri in 1986, and also later graduated from American University Law School in 1998. Before becoming a full-time journalist, he served as a former director at Ohio State University and University of Kansas.

Triplett died on January 17, 2013, of cancer at his mother's house in Madison, Alabama. He is survived by his partner Jack Squier, his mother, and a sister.
