= M. S. Udayamurthy =

- Born: 1928; Vila Nagar, Mayiladuthurai district, Tamilnadu
- Died: 21 January 2013 (aged 85)
- Occupations: writer, social activist

M.S. Udayamurthy (Tamil : எம். எஸ். உதயமூர்த்தி) (1927 or 1928 - 21 Jan 2013) was a Tamil writer and social activist.

Author of several books on self-improvement, Udayamurthy's prominent works include Ennangal (thoughts), Unnal Mudiyum Thambi (You can, brother), née than thambi mudhal amaichar (you are the chief minister).

An environmental activist, Udayamurthy, founder of Makkal Sakthi Iyakkam (People's Power Movement), actively pursued projects like linking of rivers.

Born in Vila Nagar in the present Mayiladuthurai district, he obtained a doctorate in chemical engineering from the United States. He later returned to India with the idea of making a difference in public life. In 1988, he started the Makkal Sakthi Iyakkam. Dr. Udhayamurthy authored 23 books, most of which spoke on personality development and self-confidence. He also authored books on business and spirituality. He undertook four ‘padayatras’ stressing the need for synchronising various rivers in the country, covering more than 2,000 km.

In 1996, members of Makkal Sakthi Iyakkam contested 11 constituencies in the Assembly elections in the State. Dr. Udhayamurthy contested from Madurai. However, none of its candidates won. Later on, he made the organisation a non-political movement. He was one of the earliest civil society activists to make a foray into public life with a view to attracting the middle class to electoral politics.

== List of books authored ==
1. Unnal Mudiyum Thambi-Nammbu!
2. Mannam, Pirarthanai, Manitharam
3. Thalaivan Oru Sinthanai
4. Uyar Manithanai Uruvaakkum Gunangal
5. Pirachenaikalkku Mudivu Kanbadhu Eppadi?
6. Athma Tharisanam
7. Thatungal Thirakkapadum!
8. Naadu Enge Selgiradhu?
9. Neethaan Thambi Muthalamaichar!
10. Sinthanai, Thozhil, Selvam
11. Manidha Uravugal
12. Nenje Anjathe Nee!
13. Thannambikaiyum Uyar Dharma Nerigalum
14. Vetriku Muthalpadi
15. Ulagaal Ariyapadatha Ragasiyam
16. Sathanaiku Oor Paadhai
17. Sontha Kaalil Nill
18. Vetri Manobhavam
19. Ennangal
20. Vallkkayai Ammaikkum Ennangal!( Translation of "As a Man Thinketh" Author-James Allen.) Book published in Dec, 1989.
