= Sergei Issakov =

Estonian literary scholar and politician

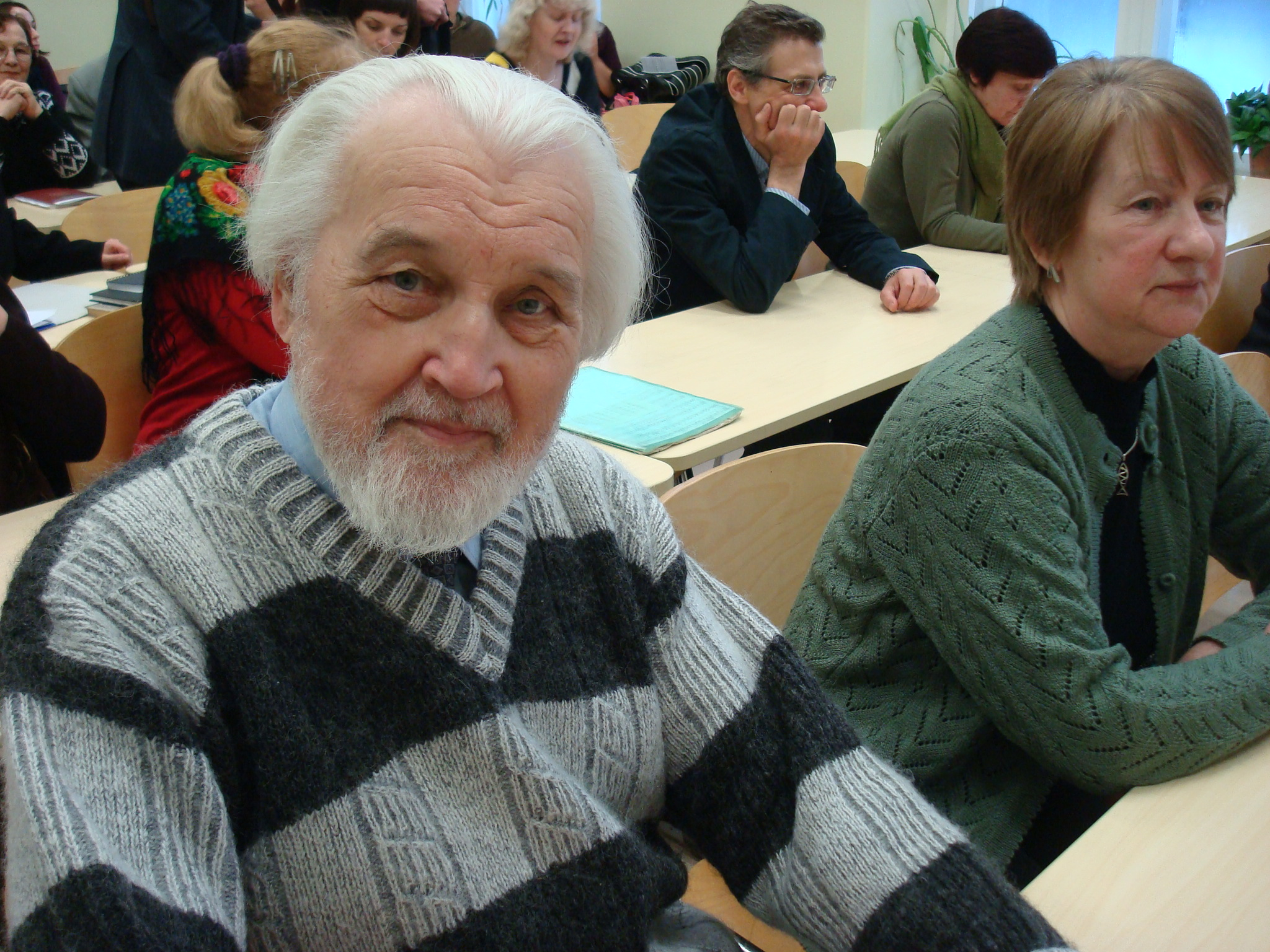
Sergei Issakov (2010)

Sergei Gennadievich Issakov (Russian: Серге́й Генна́диевич Исако́в; 8 October 1931, Narva – 11 January 2013, Tartu) was an Estonian literary scholar and politician.

Issakov was born into a family of first generation intellectuals (his grandmothers and grandparents were workers and peasants, but his father and mother became intellectuals). His parents were from Narva and of Russian descent. In 1941, his father was arrested on charges of espionage. A special meeting sentenced him to seven and a half years of imprisonment, and two years later he died in the camp.

He studied with Juri Lotman at the University of Tartu and graduated in 1954 as a philologist of Russian. In 1955, he became a university lecturer, and from 1978 to 1997, he was a professor, and afterwards, an emeritus professor. Issakov was a Doctor of Philology from 1976 to his death. He worked as a lecturer in Russian literature at the University of Helsinki.

From 1995 to 1999, Issakov was a member of the Riigikogu for the pro-Russian Our Home is Estonia coalition, representing Tartu.

== Works ==
Issakov had published numerous studies primarily on Russian-Estonian cultural relations.

- "Postitõllaga läbi Eestimaa" compilation (1971).
- Collected works "Tartu Ülikooli ajalugu", co-authored (1982).
- The Estonian-language studies in the collection "Arhiivide peidikuist" (1983).
- "Mälestusi Tartu Ülikoolist (17.–19. sajand)" (compilation) Tallinn, Eesti Raamat, 1986.
- "Tuhandeaastane teekond. Venelased Eestis. Kultuurilugu" (2009)

== Awards ==
- 3rd Class of the Order of the White Star (received 23 February 2003)
- Annual Cultural Endowment for Literature Prize (2010)
