= Ted Talbert =

American journalist

Ted Talbert (1942 – January 22, 2013) was an American journalist, documentary-maker and historian. Talbert was born and raised in Royal Oak Township and attended Northern High School in Detroit, Michigan.

== Career ==
In his career, as a writer, he served as an advisor for the Detroit Free Press sportswriters about black African-American Detroit. Talbert was a close friend of Carolyn Franklin, and had a good friendship with Detroit's former mayor Coleman Young.

== Personal life ==
Talbert won five Emmy Awards for his work. In 2000, he was inducted as an official member of the Michigan Journalism Hall of Fame.

== Death ==
He died on January 22, 2013, of a heart attack at his home and is survived by daughter Jamile Skinner, son Ted Talbert proceeded him in death February 1, 2010, four grandchildren, and a sister.
