= Edward Stankiewicz =

Polish-American linguist (1920–2013)

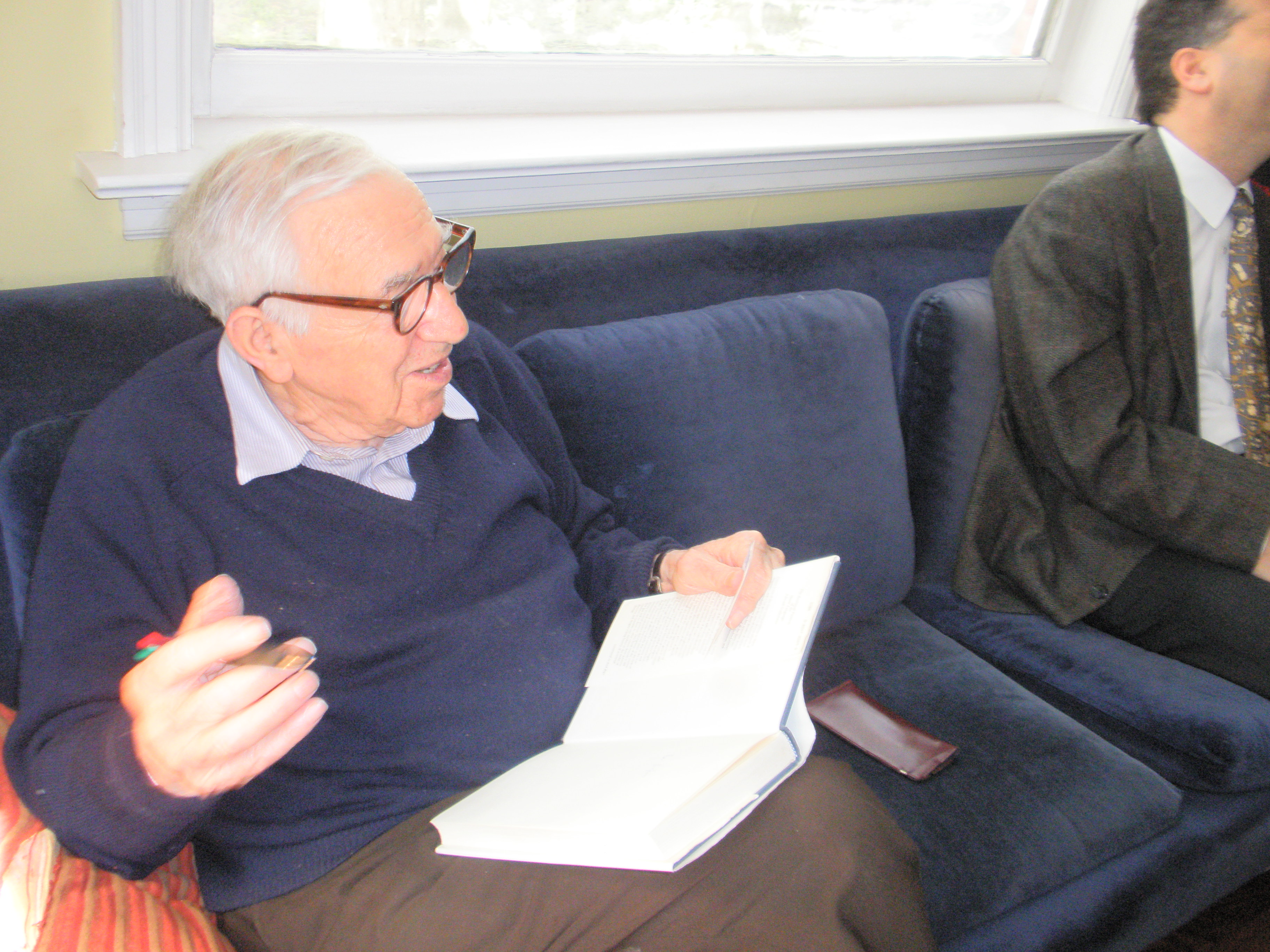
- Edward Stankiewicz, 2010
- Born: November 17, 1920; Warsaw, Poland
- Died: January 31, 2013 (aged 92); New Haven, Connecticut, United States

Academic work
- Main interests: Linguistics, Slavic studies, Slavic accentology

Edward Stankiewicz (17 November 1920 – 31 January 2013) was the B. E. Bensinger Professor of Slavic Languages and Literatures at Yale University, New Haven, Connecticut from 1971 until he retired in 1991.

== Early life ==
Stankiewicz was born in Warsaw to a Jewish family in 1920. He survived the Holocaust, and immigrated to the United States after being freed from Buchenwald concentration camp. Stankiewicz developed a love for Italian when he transited through the country after World War II.

== Research ==
Stankiewicz received his PhD from Harvard in 1954. He subsequently taught at Indiana University Bloomington and the University of Chicago before joining Yale in 1971.

Stankiewicz is best known for his research on Slavic accentology and morphophonemics. He wrote on all Slavic languages, but took a particular interest in South Slavic languages and traveled to Yugoslavia in order to conduct field studies.

== Select publications ==
- Towards a Phonemic Typology of the Slavic Languages. 1958. 's-Gravenhage: Mouton.
- The Common Slavic Prosodic Pattern and Its Evolution in Slovenian. 1966. The Hague: Mouton.
- Studies in Slavic Morphonemics and Accentology. 1976. Ann Arbor, Michigan: Michigan Slavic Publications.
- Baudouin de Courtenay and the Foundations of Structural Linguistics. 1976. Lisse: Peter de Ridder.
- Grammars and Dictionaries of the Slavic Languages from the Middle Ages up to 1850: An Annotated Bibliography. 1984. Berlin: Mouton.
- The Slavic Languages Unity in Diversity. 1986. Berlin: Mouton.
- The Accentual Patterns of the Slavic Languages. 1993. Stanford, California: Stanford University Press.
- My War Memoir of a Young Jewish Poet. 2002. Syracuse, New York: Syracuse University Press.
