= Jürgen Himmelbauer =

Austrian politician (1958 - 2013)

Jürgen Himmelbauer (born 20 November 1958 died 13 January 2013) was an Austrian politician. He served as a Green Party councilor in the Linz city council.

== Death ==
On 13 January 2013 he died of an illness at age 55.
