= Helen Wyatt Snapp =

American aviator

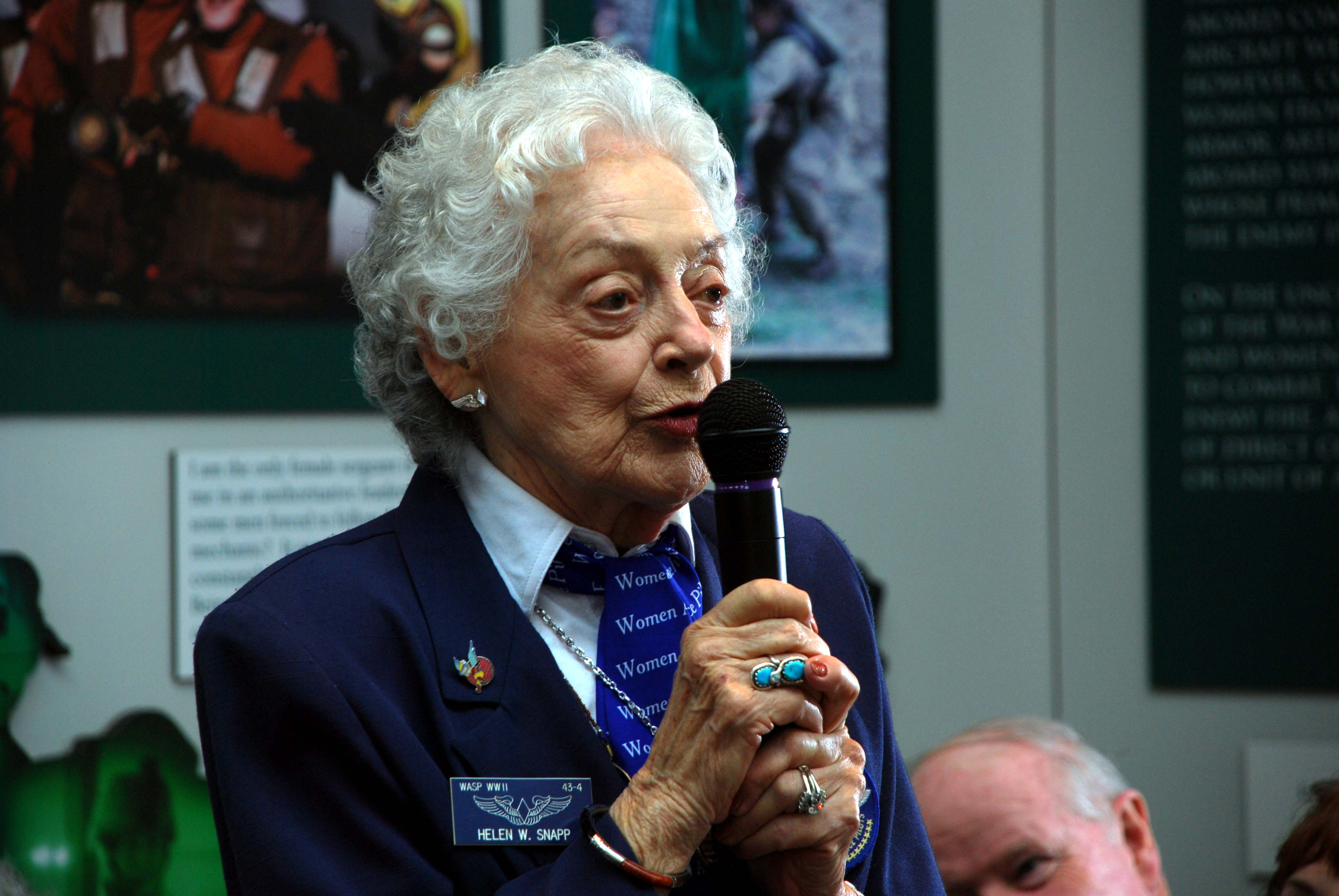
Helen Wyatt Snapp in 2008.

Helen Maude Wyatt Snapp (May 1, 1918 – January 20, 2013) was an American aviator. Snapp became one of the Women Airforce Service Pilots (WASP) in 1943.

== Biography ==
Snapp was born on May 1, 1918, and grew up in Washington, D.C. She graduated from Western High School. She planned on becoming a teacher and started taking classes at Mary Washington College. She started flying during her summer break and later began to train with the Civilian Pilot Training Program. Snapp married an infantry officer in the U.S. Army, Ira Benton Snapp, and shortly after he was sent overseas, she heard about the Women Airforce Service Pilots (WASP). Snapp was initially rejected because she didn't have enough flying hours, but in 1943, the flight hour requirement was lowered and she was accepted.

Snapp became a part of class 43 W-4 and trained at Avenger Field in Sweetwater, Texas. After she graduated, she was sent to Camp Davis Army Air Field. She towed targets over the Atlantic and soldiers on the beach shot live ammunition at the target. She was shortly after sent to Liberty Field near Fort Stewart where she was part of the 'R-Flight' program where she learned to fly radio-controlled drones. She also served on New Castle Army Air Base. She served as a WASP for two years and gained 1,000 hours of flight time.

Snapp didn't talk about her time as a WASP with her family until the program was declassified in 1972. Afterwards, she became an advocate for the WASP to be recognized officially as military veterans. Snapp moved from Alexandria to Pembroke Pines in 1984. She was presented with a Congressional Gold Medal in 2010 for her service with WASP.

Snapp died on January 20, 2013, in Pembroke Pines from complications coming after suffering a broken hip. Her WASP uniform is in the collection of the Fort Stewart Museum.
