= Nii Tackie Tawiah III =

Ghanaian King

Nii Tackie Tawiah III (6 October 1940 – December 2012) was the Ga Mantse in the Ga State, a traditional kingship in the Greater Accra Region in Ghana from 2006 until his death in 2012.

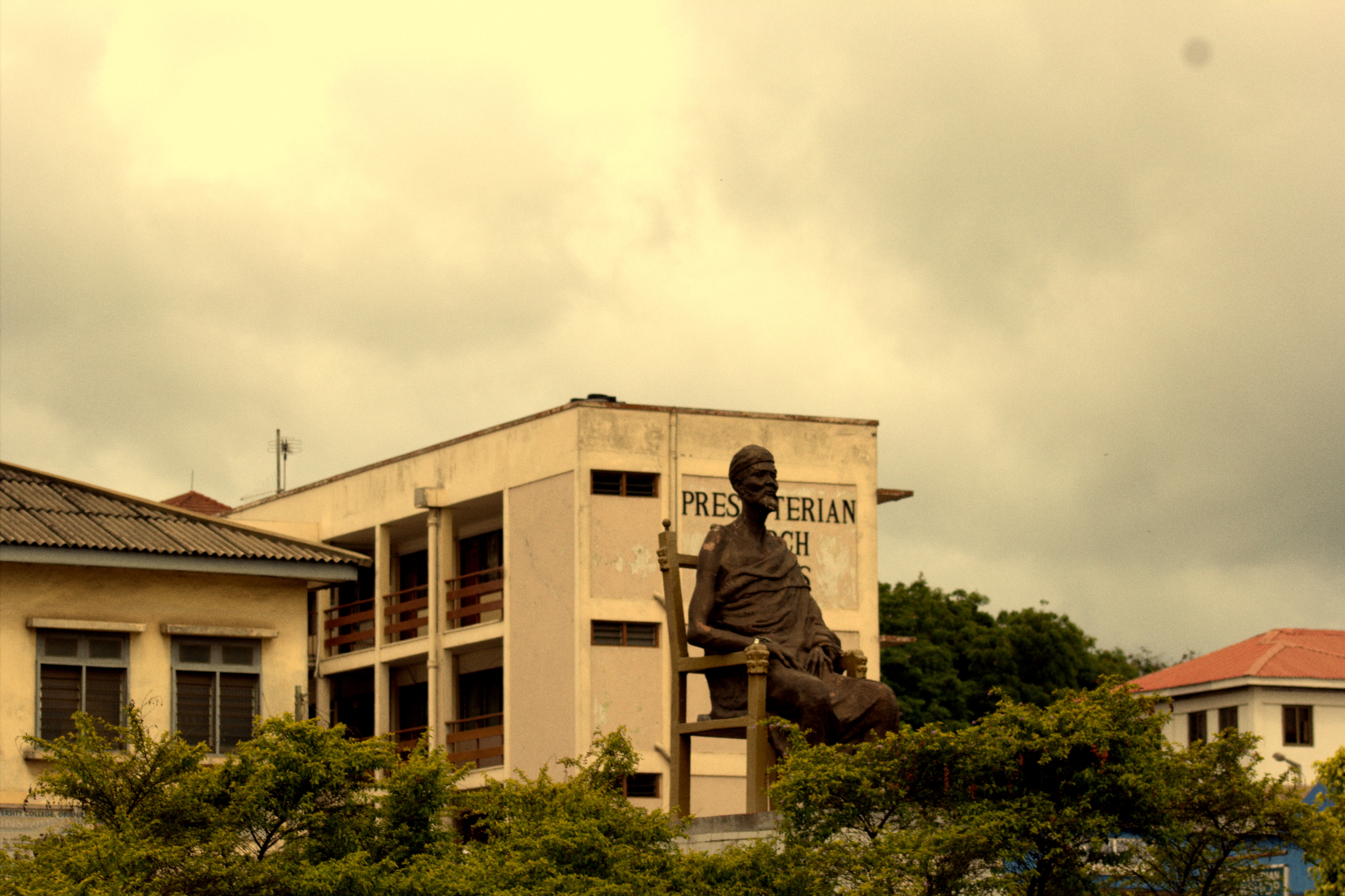
A statue of Nii Tackie Tawiah III situated at Accra Central

Before his installation in June 2006, King Tackie Tawiah had been a member of the National Development Planning Commission (NDPC) since 2002 and former member of the Law Review Commission.

He held a BA degree in Political Science Pace University, New York City and an Masters Degree in Economics (New School for Social Research, New York). He also had a PhD in Public Law (New School for Social Research, New York City and an LL.B in Law in La Salle University, Chicago.

He had indicated that although every child developed by learning how to sit, crawl, walk and run, the situation in which the Gas found themselves demanded, that "we run immediately because we are lagging behind".

With his ambition well defined, the late Ga Mantse, during his coronation, announced the establishment of a Ga Development Corporation (GDC) to raise funds for the speedy development of the Ga State. From the beginning, his overtaking of the traditionally rotating kingship had been disputed and recently also challenged by several claimants, however a local court ruled in his favor of his rule in 2012.

In January 2013, it was reported that Tawiah had died in a London hospital after a short illness in December 2012.
