= Magomed Gadjievich Magomedov =

Dagestani judge

Magomed Magomedov
- Магомед Магомедов
- Born: 16 January 1957; Kubachi, Dakhadayevsky District, Dagestan ASSR, Russian SFSR, Soviet Union
- Died: 15 January 2013 (aged 55); Makhachkala, Dagestan, Russia
- Occupation: Judge

Magomed Gadzhiyevich Magomedov (Russian: Магомед Гаджиевич Магомедов; 16 January 1957 – 15 January 2013) was a Russian judge who was the senior judge at the Supreme Court of Dagestan.

== Early life ==
Magomedov was born in Kubachi, Dagestan, in 1957.

== Career ==
Magomedov was a judge at the Supreme Court of Dagestan and dealt with high-profile cases that were mostly related to terrorists and Islamic insurgents. He was one of nine judges in the presidium of the court.

== Death and funeral ==
On 15 January 2013, around 9 p.m. in Makhachkala, Magomedov was shot by an unknown person while he was heading to his home. He died on the spot. A funeral service was carried out for him in his native village, Kubachi, on 16 January 2013.
