= Jasuben Shilpi =

Indian bronze sculptor

- Born: 10 December 1948
- Died: 14 January 2013 (aged 64); Ahmedabad, Gujarat, India
- Occupation: Bronze sculptor
- Website: Jasu Shilpi

Jasuben Shilpi or Jasu Shilpi (10 December 1948 – 14 January 2013) was an Indian bronze sculpture artist. In her career she made more than 525 bust size and 225 large size statues. She was popularly known as "The Bronze woman of India".

== Career ==
In her career Jasuben made more than 525 busts and 225 large bronze statues. Her works included statues of personalities such as Mohandas Karamchand Gandhi, Rani Laxmibai, Swami Vivekananda and Vallabhbhai Patel. Her sculpture works have been installed in Indian states including Tamil Nadu, Maharashtra, Karnataka, Kerala, Rajasthan, Bihar, Uttarakhand. She made a number of statues under a contract with Ahmedabad Municipal Corporation which were spread all over the city. Her works of standing figures of Mahatma Gandhi and Martin Luther King Jr. have been placed in Florida University, Jacksonville, Chicago and City of Charlotte, North Carolina.

== Death ==
Jasuben died on 14 January 2013 after a severe cardiac arrest. At the time of death she was 64 years old and had two children Dhruv and Dhara who are also sculptors. In her last days she was busy making a bronze statue of Amitabh Bachchan. The work remained unfinished because of her death.

Snehal Jadvani, an admirer of Jasuben's works told after her death–"She will always remain in our hearts."

== Recognitions ==
In her career, Jasuben won several national and international awards and honours. She was popularly known as "The Bronze woman of India". In 2005, for her bronze statue depicting Rani Laxmibai riding on a horse her name was included in Limca Book of Records.

Sculptor Dhananjay Mudholkar said of Jasuben – "She was one of a few women sculptors in the country whose work got wide spread acknowledgement and fame."
