= Delmo Alberghini =

Delmo F. Alberghini
Personal information
- Nationality: American
- Born: December 11, 1922
- Died: January 10, 2013 (aged 90)

Sport
- Sport: Track and field
- Event: Hurdles

Achievements and titles
- Olympic finals: Qualified for the 1944 London Olympics (canceled due to WWII)

Delmo F. Alberghini (December 11, 1922 – January 10, 2013) was a member of the Northeastern University athletics Hall of Fame. Alberghini was inducted in 1975 for his accomplishments in track.

Alberghini was one of the fastest men in all of New England during most of the 1940s and held the records in almost all collegiate and amateur hurdle events including setting a world record for the 70-yard low hurdle in 1943. Alberghini also took second in the IC4A 60-yard hurdles during the indoor season. He qualified for the 1944 London Olympics for hurdling; however, the games were cancelled due to World War II.
