= Eifan Saadoun Al Issawi =

Iraqi politician

- Born: 1975 or 1976
- Died: 15 January 2013 (aged 37); Fallujah, Iraq
- Cause of death: Assassination
- Resting place: Fallujah

Eifan Saadoun Al Issawi (1975/1976 – 15 January 2013) was an Iraqi politician who was killed in a suicide bombing attack on 15 January 2013.

== Early life ==
Issawi was born into a Sunni family belonging to the Albu Issa tribe. Rafi Al Issawi, Iraqi finance minister, is also a member of the tribe.

== Career ==
During the Iraq war, Issawi acted as one of the leaders of the Sahwa movement or the Awakening Council, which cooperated with the U.S. military to defeat Al-Qaeda members in Iraq. The movement is also known as Sons of Iraq.

Issawi was the head of the provincial committee of security and defense in Anbar. He joined the Iraqi parliament in August 2011 as deputy for Al Anbar Governorate. He was part of the Iraqiyya bloc to which Rafi Al Issawi also belongs. The Iraqiyya bloc is mainly backed by Sunni Iraqis. In addition, Eifan Issawi served as a member of the parliament's security and defense committee.

== Assassination and funeral ==
Issawi was assassinated by a suicide bomber in Fallujah, Anbar province, on 15 January 2013 at the age of 37. He was on his way to participate in an anti-war demonstration in Fallujah. The bomber, who disguised himself as a construction worker, approached Issawi and then blew himself up, killing three bodyguards of Issawi as well. The blast also killed three laborers and injured others in the scene.

A funeral ceremony for him was held in Fallujah on 16 January. Three mourners were injured in a bombing attack at the funeral.

=== Perpetrators ===
On 20 January 2013, Al Qaeda's political front in Iraq, The Islamic State of Iraq (ISI), claimed responsibility for the assassination of Issawi.

== Reactions ==
The Turkish Foreign Ministry issued a statement and strongly condemned the assassination of Issawi.
