= List of universities in Ghana =

Location of Ghana

This is a list of universities in Ghana. For the purposes of this list, colleges and universities are defined as accredited, degree-granting, tertiary-level institutions. Small universities (especially private ones) are affiliated to larger established public institutions, and most higher education institutions are named "university college". The country's colleges which are incorporated with universities are listed as "university college". The country's "polytechnics" are also listed.

There are other educational institutions in Ghana - some are local campuses of foreign universities, some conduct classes for students who write their exams at the distance-education centers of the larger Ghanaian universities. Universities and colleges are accredited by the Ghana Tertiary Education Commission.

| Institution | Nickname | Founded | Undergrad | Postgrad | Total (2011) | Location(s) |
Public universities^{1}
| University of Ghana | Legon | 1948 | | | 38,000 | Legon, Accra, Korle Bu and Atomic, Greater Accra, including over ten workers' colleges all over the ten regions of Ghana |
| Kwame Nkrumah University of Science and Technology | KNUST | 1952 | 21,285 | 2,306 | 23,591 | Kumasi, Ashanti |
| University of Cape Coast | Cape Vars | 1961 | | | 15,835 | Cape Coast, Central |
| University for Technology and Applied Sciences | UTAS | 2020 | | | | Navrongo, Upper East |
| University of Education, Winneba | UEW | 1992 | | | 16,879 | Winneba, Central |
| University of Business and Integrated Development Studies | UBIDS | 2020 | | | | Wa, Upper West |
| University of Skills Training and Entrepreneurial Development, Kumasi | USTED | 2020 | | | | Kumasi, Ashanti Mampong, Ashanti |
| University for Development Studies | UDS | 1992 | | | | Tamale, Northern |
| University of Professional Studies | UPS | 1965 | | | 10,000 | Accra, Greater Accra |
| University of Mines and Technology | UMAT | 2001 | | | | Tarkwa, Western |
| University of Health and Allied Sciences | UHAS | 2011 | | | | Ho, Volta |
| University of Energy and Natural Resources | UENR | 2012 | | | | Sunyani, Bono |
| University of Environment and Sustainable Development | UESD | 2020 | | | | Somanya, Eastern Region |
| Ghana Institute of Management and Public Administration | GIMPA | | | | | Legon, Accra |
| Ghana Communication Technology University | GCTU | 2005 | | | | Tesano, Accra |
| University of Engineering and Agricultural Sciences | UEAS | 2026 | | | | Bunso, Eastern Region |
| Accra Technical University | ATU | | | | | Accra, Greater Accra |
| Bolgatanga Technical University | BTU | | | | | Bolgatanga, Upper East Region |
| Cape Coast Technical University | CCTU | | | | | Cape Coast, Central |
| Kumasi Technical University | KsTU | | | | | Kumasi, Ashanti |
| Koforidua Technical University | KTU | | | | | Koforidua, Eastern |
| Tamale Technical University | TATU | | | | | Tamale, Northern |
| Ho Technical University | HTU | | | | | Ho, Volta |
| Takoradi Technical University | TTU | | | | | Takoradi, Western |
| Sunyani Technical University | STU | | | | | Sunyani, Bono |
| Wa Technical University | WTU | | | | | Wa, Upper West Region |
^1 There are fifteen (15) national public universities in Ghana. There are ten (10) Technical Universities IN Ghana
Professional public institutes / public universities^{2}
| Ghana Armed Forces Command and Staff College | GAFCSC | | | | | Accra, Greater Accra |
| Ghana Institute of Journalism | GIJ | | | | | Accra, Greater Accra (formerly affiliated to the University of Ghana) |
| Ghana Institute of Languages | GIL | 1961 | | | | Accra, Greater Accra (affiliated to the University of Ghana) |
| Ghana Institute of Surveying and Mapping | GISM | | | | | Accra, Greater Accra |
| Institution of Local Government Studies | ILGS | | | | | Legon, Greater Accra |
| University of Professional Studies, Accra | UPSA | | | | | Legon, Greater Accra (formerly affiliated to the University of Ghana) |
| Kofi Annan International Peacekeeping Training Centre | KAIPTC | 1998 | | | | Accra, Greater Accra |
| National Film and Television Institute | NAFTI | 1978 | | | | Accra, Greater Accra |
^2 Nine additional professional institutions have been accorded public university status.
Regional university
| Regional Maritime University | RMU | 2007 | | | | Accra, Greater Accra |
Diplomatic Missions Training university (United Nations University affiliated institutions)
| Consular and Diplomatic Service University (CDSU) | CDSU | 2015 | | | | Accra, Greater Accra |
Private universities
Chartered private tertiary institutions^{3}
| Academic City University | ACity | 2008 | | | | Haatso, Greater Accra |
| Heritage Christian University | HCU | 2016 | | | | Amasaman, Greater Accra Region |
| KAAF University | KAAF | 2006 | | | ≈8,000 | Gomoa Fetteh Kakraba, Central |
| Valley View University | VVU | 1979 | | | | Oyibi, Greater Accra |
| Open University of West Africa | OUWA | 2011 | | | | Accra, Ghana |
| Trinity Theological Seminary, Legon | TTS | 1942 | | | | Legon, Greater-Accra |
| Akrofi-Christaller Institute of Theology, Mission and Culture | ACI | 1987 | | | | Akropong–Akuapem, Eastern |
| Central University | Central | 1998 | 8400 | | | Accra, Greater Accra |
| Pentecost University | Pent Vars | 2003 | | | | Sowutuom, Greater Accra |
| All Nations University | ANU | 2002 | | | | Koforidua, Eastern |
| Ashesi University | Ashesi | 2002 | 1654 | 176 | 1830 (2026) | Berekuso, Eastern Region |
| Ensign Global University | Ensonian | 2014 | 1260 | | | Kpong, Eastern Region |
Other university colleges and private universities (University of Ghana affiliated institutions)
| Accra Institute of Technology | AIT | 2005 | 2,100 | 350 | 2,450 | Cantonments, Greater Accra |
| African University College of Communications | AUCC | | | | | Adabraka, Greater Accra, Ghana |
| Anglican University College of Technology | ANG.U.TECH | 2008 | | | | Nkoranza Campus, Nkoranza, Bono East |
| University College of Design and Technology | AUCDT | 2015 | | | | Accra, Greater Accra (affiliated to the University of Education, Winneba) |
| Catholic University College of Ghana | CUG | 2003 | | | | Fiapre, Sunyani, Bono |
| Christian Service University College | CSUC | 1974 | | | | Kumasi, Ashanti |
| Family Health Medical School | FHMS | 2015 | | | | Teshie, Greater Accra |
| Good News Theological Seminary | GNTS | 1971 | | | | Oyibi, Greater Accra |
| Islamic University College | IUCG | 1988 | | | | East Legon, Greater Accra |
| Knutsford University College | Knutsford | | | | | East Legon, Greater Accra |
| Lancaster University | LUG | 2013 | | | | Accra, Greater Accra |
| Methodist University Ghana | MUCG | 2000 | | | 1,887 | Dansoman, Accra, Greater Accra |
| Presbyterian University College | PUC | 2003 | | | | Abetifi-Kwahu, Akropong-Akuapem, Agogo Asante-Akyem and Tema |
| Wisconsin International University College | WIUC | 2000 | | | | Agbogba Junction, Greater Accra (affiliated to the University of Cape Coast) |
| Central University College | Central | 1998 | 8,400 | | | Accra, Greater Accra (affiliated to the University of Cape Coast) |
| Catholic Institute of Business and Technology | CIBT | | | | | Accra, Greater Accra |
| National Film and Television Institute | NAFTI | 1978 | | | | Accra, Greater Accra |
| Institute Of Accountancy Training | IAT | | | | | Accra, Greater Accra |
| Narh-Bita School of Nursing | Narh-Bita | | | | | Accra, Greater Accra |
| Ghana Institute of Languages | GIL | 1961 | | | | Accra, Greater Accra (affiliated to the University of Ghana) |
| St. Victor's Seminary | SVMS | | | | | Accra, Greater Accra |
| St. Peters Seminary | SPMS | | | | | Accra, Greater Accra |
| St. Paul Seminary | SPCS | | | | | Accra, Greater Accra |
| Ghana Armed Forces Command and Staff College - Master's degree | GAFCSC | | | | | Accra, Greater Accra |
| Regional Maritime University | RMU | 2007 | | | | Accra, Greater Accra |
| BlueCrest College (formerly NIIT Ghana College) | BCCG | 1999 | | | | Accra, Greater Accra (affiliated to the University of Education, Winneba) |
Kwame Nkrumah University of Science & Technology affiliated institutions
| College of Science, Arts and Education | CSAE | 2016 | | | | Sunyani, Bono Region, Ghana (affiliated to the Kwame Nkrumah University of Science & Technology) |
| Accra Institute of Technology | AIT | 2005 | 2,100 | 350 | 2,450 | Cantonments, Greater Accra |
| Osei Tutu II Institute for Advanced ICT Studies | | | | | | Kumasi, Ashanti |
| Radford University College | Radford | | | | | Kumasi, Ashanti |
| Garden City University College | GCUC | 2001 | | | | Kumasi, Ashanti |
| Christ Apostolic University College | CAUC | 2011 | | | | Kumasi, Ashanti |
| Regent University College of Science and Technology | Regent | 2003 | | | | Accra, Greater Accra (affiliated to the Maastricht School of Management, Netherlands) |
| Technical University College | TUC | | | | | Tamale, Northern Region (affiliated to the University of Ghana) |
| Spiritan University College | Spiritan | | | | | Ejisu, Ashanti |
| Data Link University College | DLUC | 2006 | | | | Tema, Greater Accra |
| Mountcrest University College | MCUC | | | | | Kanda, Accra, Greater Accra |
| University College of Agriculture and Environmental Studies | UCAES | 1963 | | | | Bunso, Eastern Region |
University of Cape Coast affiliated institutions
| Entrepreneurship Training Institute | ETI | | | | | Accra, Greater Accra |
| Deltas University College | DUC | | | | | Accra, Greater Accra |
| Evangelical Presbyterian University College | EPUC | 2008 | | | | Ho, Volta |
| Ghana Baptist University College | GBUC | 2006 | | | | Abuakwa, Kumasi, Ashanti |
| Kings University College | KUC | | | | | Aplaku Hills, Accra, Greater Accra |
| Maranatha University College | MUC | | | | | Sowutuom, Accra, Greater Accra |
| Meridian (Insaaniyya) University College | MEDUCOL | | | | | Weija, Accra, Greater Accra |
| Palm University College | PaUC | | | | | Manya, Shai Hills, Greater Accra |
| Pan African Christian University College | PACUC | | | | | Accra, Greater Accra (affiliation under negotiation) |
| Wisconsin International University College | WIUC | 2000 | | | | Agbogba Junction, Greater Accra (also affiliated to the University of Ghana) |
University of Education, Winneba affiliated institutions
| Advanced Business University College | ABUC | | | | | Accra, Greater Accra |
| BlueCrest University College | BCUC | 2000 | | | | Accra, Greater Accra; Kumasi, Ashanti |
| Jayee University College | JUC | | | | | Accra, Greater Accra |
| University College of Management Studies | UCOMS | 1974 | | | | Accra, Greater Accra; Kumasi, Ashanti |
Sikkim Manipal University, India affiliated institutions
| Sikkim Manipal University, Kumasi | SMUG | 2011 | | | | CityStyle Building, Stadium Road, Kumasi, Ashanti Accra |
Karunya University, India affiliated institutions
| Ghana Christian University College | GCUC | | | | | Accra, Greater Accra; Kumasi, Ashanti (affiliation under negotiation) |
Australian Institute of Business Administration affiliated institutions
| Zenith University College | ZUC | 2001 | | | | La, Accra, Greater Accra; Kumasi, Ashanti (affiliated to the University of Cape Coast) |
China Europe International Business School affiliated institutions
| China Europe International Business School | CEIBS | 1994 | 1,078 | | | Accra, Greater Accra |
University of Wales affiliated institutions
| Ghana Christian University College | GCUC | | | | | Dodowa, Accra, Greater Accra |
Others - unclear affiliated institutions
| The Bible University College of Ghana | BUCG | | | | | Akuapem, Eastern Region |
| Catholic Institute of Business and Technology | CIBT | | | | | Accra, Greater Accra |
| North American Center for Professional Studies | NACPS | 2011 | | | | Kasoa, Central Region |
| Premier Institute of Law Enforcement Management and Administration | PILEMA | | | | | Accra, Greater Accra |
^3 There are seven institutions in the Chartered private tertiary institutions category.
