= Mobile Web Ghana =

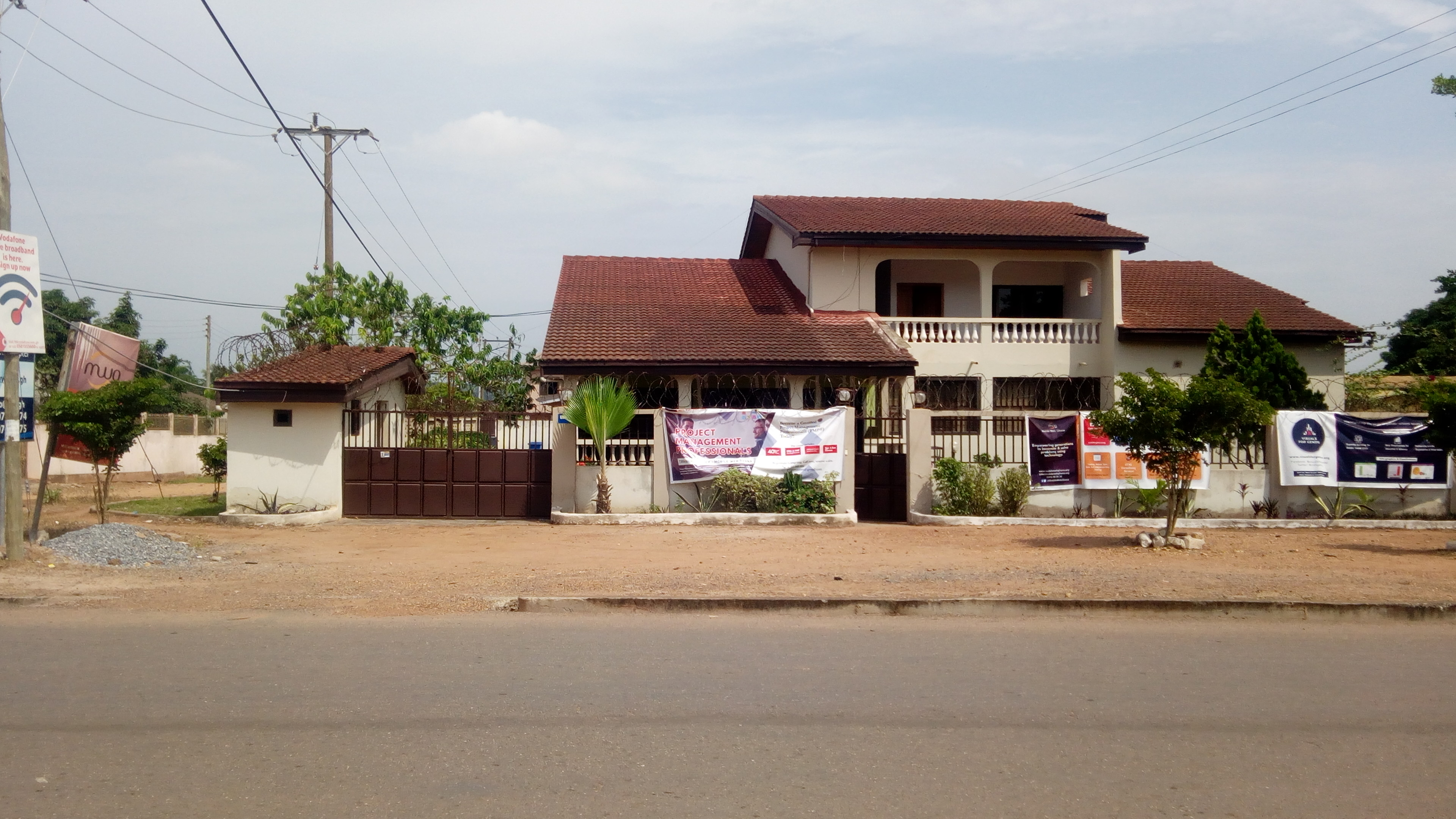
- Mobile Web Ghana
- Abbreviation: MWG
- Founders: Florence Abena Toffa
- Type: NGO
- Legal status: Technology Hub
- Purpose: Entrepreneurial training and mobile technologies
- Location: Agbogba, Madina, Ghana, Accra
- Coordinates: 5.6806509°N 0.1941041°W
- Services: Web Development, co-working space, events
- Website: mobilewebghana.org

Mobile Web Ghana is a technology hub and a co-working space in Accra, Ghana that empowers entrepreneurs and the youth through mobile and web technology training. It was started in October 2010, as part of the World Wide Web Foundation ‘Mobile Entrepreneurship Ghana’ program. Mobile Web Ghana was among the tech hubs represented at Impact Hub Accra during the visit of French President Emmanuel Macron and Dutch Prime Minister Mark Rutte. MWG and iSpace Foundation led the Unlocking Women and Technology (UWAT) to equip women and ladies technology and entrepreneurial skills in Accra.

== See also ==
- iSpace Foundation
- Impact Hub Accra
