= Accra Psychiatric Hospital =

Mental health facility in Adabraka, Ghana

Geography
- Location: Adabraka, Ghana

Organisation
- Type: Psychiatric

Services
- Beds: 600

Helipads
- Helipad: No

History
- Founded: 1906

Links
- Website: https://accrapsychiatrichospital.org
- Lists: Hospitals in Ghana

Accra Psychiatric Hospital (APH) is a mental health facility located in Adabraka, a suburb of Accra in the Korle Klottey Municipal in the Greater Accra Region of Ghana. As at 2022, the hospital has a bed capacity of 600. As at 2022, the Director of the hospital is Dr. Pinaman Appau. As at 2024, the Director of the hospital is Dr. Kwadwo Marfo Obeng.

== History ==
The hospital was established in 1906 and formerly known as Lunatic Asylum. It was the first facility in the country exclusively dedicated to mental health treatment. At the time, the facility accommodated 200 patients and consisted of four wards; female, male, general, and criminal wards. The lunatic asylum then underwent modifications and extension into the psychiatric hospital with a 600 bed capacity

== Facilities ==
The hospital has a nurse station, dining hall and a circulation room.

== Services ==
The Accra Psychiatric Hospital (APH) offers inpatient and outpatient services for individuals with a variety of mental health conditions, including Schizophrenia, bipolar disorder and depression. It provides emergency psychiatric care, substance abuse treatment and counselling services.

== Redevelopment ==
In November 2022, Kwaku Agyeman Manu, the then minister of health stated in a Facebook post that, the hospital would be redeveloped into a new 220-bed psychiatric hospital under the Agenda 111 hospitals project.

== Controversy ==
In November 2023, Dr. Stephen Apio, a psychiatrist at the hospital was ordered to testify on the mental health of Daniel Axim. His involvement was not as a suspect or party to the case, but as an independent medical expert appointed by the High Court .His association with the case arose from concerns raised regarding the mental health of Daniel Axim, the second accused person in the ongoing MASLOC (Microfinance and small loans centre) financial loss case. The court considered it necessary to establish whether Axim was mentally capable of participating in his defence before allowing the criminal proceedings to continue. Dr Apio's responsibility was limited to providing an independent clinical opinion on whether Axim possessed the mental capacity to understand the court's proceedings, instruct his legal counsel, and meaningfully take part in his defence. His testimony did not address the criminal allegations themselves or decide the accused of guilt or innocence. Instead, it ensured that the legal path designed to secure that every accused person receives a fair trial in accordance with the principles of due processand natural justice.

== Challenges ==
Over the years, the hospital has faced numerous persistent challenges, listing chronic overcrowding and inadequate funding, which have placed significant pressure on both its infrastructure and healthcare staff. The widespread cultural stigma surrounding mental illness has undoubtedly further limited public support and investment in mental health services. Additionally, sections of the facility have experienced infrastructural deterioration due to insufficient maintenance, resulting in substandard living conditions for patients and an environment that hinders the delivery of the best, quality care

== Donations ==
In June 2023, the Ghana International Women’s club (GIWC), an NGO donated items to the hospital.

In November 2022, the National Lottery Authority (NLA) donated food items and toiletries to the hospital.

In December 2022, Alisa Hotel donated cash and items to the hospital.

In October 2025, the National Pension Regulatory Authority (NPRA) led by the then Board Chairman, Mr. Paul S. M. Koranteng, and the Board Members cut sod to start the construction of a canteen for the staff and patients of the hospital.
