= Enyonam Manye =

Enyonam Manye is a Ghanaian journalist and entrepreneur most notable for founding Count on Crops Hub which produces The Ghanaian Farmer TV Show broadcast on Joy Prime TV as well as the online news venue The Ghanaian Farmer. She previously was the host of The Biztrends Show. The organization works with the Ministry of Food and Agriculture (Ghana) to improve information sharing with farmers throughout Ghana.

She won an award in 2023 for Agri-journalist of the Year from the African Women in Agribusiness Awards organized by Guzakuza. In 2024, she hosted an award show for recognition of Top 50 Most Influential Agribusiness Women in Africa.

She was a graduate of the African University College of Communications.
