= Francis Allotey =

Ghanaian physicist and mathematician

Francis Kofi Ampenyin Allotey FGA OV
- Born: 9 August 1932; Saltpond, Gold Coast
- Died: 2 November 2017 (aged 85); Accra, Ghana
- Resting place: Saltpond, Ghana
- Education: Ghana National College; Imperial College London (DIC); Princeton University (MSc, PhD)
- Known for: Allotey Formalism
- Awards: UK Prince Philip Golden Award (1973)
- Scientific career
- Fields: Mathematical physics
- Workplaces: Kwame Nkrumah University of Science and Technology

Francis Kofi Ampenyin Allotey FGA OV (9 August 1932 – 2 November 2017) was a Ghanaian mathematical physicist. Together with Daniel Afedzi Akyeampong, he became the first Ghanaian to obtain a doctorate in mathematical sciences, earned in 1966.

== Early life and education ==
Allotey was born on 9 August 1932 in the Fante town of Saltpond in the Central Region of Ghana to Joseph Kofi Allotey, a general commodities merchant and Alice Esi Nyena Allotey, a dressmaker from the Royal Dehyena family of Enyan Owomase and Ekumfi Edumafa, in the Central Region of Ghana. His father owned a bookstore. During his childhood, Allotey spent his free time in his father's bookstore reading the biographies of famous scientists which piqued his interest in science. He was raised a Roman Catholic. He had his primary education at St. John the Baptist Catholic (Boys) School in Saltpond and was among the pioneer batch of Ghana National College when the school was founded in July 1948 by Kwame Nkrumah.

After secondary school, he attended the University Tutorial College in Ghana and the London Borough Polytechnic. He held master's and doctorate degrees from Princeton University, awarded in 1966 and earlier the Diploma of Imperial College, obtained in 1960. He was tutored by the Pakistani Nobel prize-winning physicist Abdus Salam as an undergraduate at Imperial College. During his time at Princeton, Allotey was mentored by many physicists such as Robert Dicke, Val Fitch, Robert Oppenheimer, Paul A. M. Dirac and C. N. Yang.

== Career ==
He was known for the "Allotey Formalism" which arose from his work on soft X-ray spectroscopy. He was the 1973 recipient of the UK Prince Philip Golden Award for his work in this area. A founding fellow of the African Academy of Sciences, in 1974, he became the first Ghanaian full professor of mathematics and head of the Department of Mathematics and later Dean of the Faculty of Science at the Kwame Nkrumah University of Science and Technology. He was also the founding director of the KNUST Computer Centre before he assumed his position as the Pro-Vice-Chancellor of the university. Among Allotey's colleagues on the mathematics faculty at KNUST was Atu Mensa Taylor (died in 1977), the third Ghanaian to obtain a doctorate in mathematics. Taylor had received his DPhil (1967) from Oxford under the Welsh mathematical physicist, John Trevor Lewis, having also received an MA there many years before.

Allotey was the President of the Ghana Academy of Arts and Sciences and a member of a number of international scientific organizations including the Abdus Salam International Centre for Theoretical Physics Scientific Council since 1996. He was also the President of the Ghana Institute of Physics and the founding President of the African Physical Society. He was instrumental in getting Ghana to join the International Union of Pure and Applied Physics, making it one of the first few African countries to join the Union. He collaborated with the IUPAP and ICTP to encourage physics education in developing countries through workshops and conferences in order to create awareness on the continent.

Allotey was the Chairman of Board of Trustees of the Accra Institute of Technology, the President of the African Institute for Mathematical Sciences, Ghana. He was an honorary fellow of the Institute of Physics. He was an honorary Fellow of the Nigerian Mathematical Society among others. He consulted for many international institutions such as the UNESCO, IAEA and UNIDO. He was also the Vice president, 7th General Assembly of Intergovernmental Bureau of Informatics (IBI). He was also instrumental in the advancement of computer education in Africa and worked closely with organisations such as the IBM International and the International Federation for Information Processing. In 2004, he was the only African among the 100 most eminent physicists and mathematicians in the world to be cited in a book titled, "One hundred reasons to be a scientist."

The Professor Francis Allotey Graduate School was established in 2009 at the Accra Institute of Technology. The institute provides master's degrees in Business Administration and Software Engineering and doctoral programmes in Information Technology and Philosophy. The Government of Ghana awarded him the Millennium Excellence Award in 2005, and dedicated a postage stamp in his honour. In 2009 he received the Order of the Volta and was posthumously awarded the Osagyefo Kwame Nkrumah African Genius Award in 2017. He helped establish the African Institute of Mathematical Sciences in Ghana in 2012.

== Personal life ==
Allotey first married Edoris Enid Chandler from Barbados, whom he met while they were both studying in London. They had two children, Francis Kojo Enu Allotey and Joseph Kobina Nyansa Allotey. Chandler died in November 1981. He then remarried to Ruby Asie Mirekuwa Akuamoah. Together they raised her two children, Cilinnie and Kay. Akuamoah died in October, 2011. Overall, Allotey had four children and 20 grandchildren.

== Death and state funeral ==
Francis Allotey died of natural causes on 2 November 2017. The Ghanaian government accorded him a state funeral in recognition of his contributions to the advancement of science and technology in Ghana. His body was interred in his hometown, Saltpond, Central Region.
