= Ascent Kollege =

Remedial school in Accra, Ghana

Ascent Kollege (also known as Ascent College) is a private remedial school based in Accra, Ghana, specializing in academic preparation programs for secondary school students and adults seeking to improve their qualifications and also provides a supportive environment designed for effective learning and personal growth. It has three main branches located at Kasoa, Dansoman and Adabraka in the Greater Accra Region of Ghana.

== History ==
Ascent Kollege was established on 22 August 2011 by Francis Kwarteng Crentsil who was a product of the University of Ghana in Adabraka, Accra, Ghana where it began as a remedial school dedicated to exam preparation. It all started when its founder, Crentsil recognised the significant gaps in remedial education options for private candidates preparing for the West African Senior School Certificate Examination (WASSCE) in the Greater Accra Region.

The institution began operating from a modest background with limited finances and basic facilities yet sustained by the commitment of its founding teachers and trustees. It began operation with three students at Adabraka then to 88 students running morning and evening remedial programmes in WASSCE private exams annually.

As the institution continued to expand its operations to meet growing demand for remedial education in the Greater Accra Region, it established branches beyond the initial Adabraka (Brook Cherith) campus at Kasoa (Oaks Cottage) and Dansoman (Cottage of Catherine). As a result, the institution grew to accommodate over 400 students annually, with other programs such as Pre-SHS vacation classes, adult education, and international test preparation which includes study abroad assistance for universities in the US, UK, Canada, and Australia, along with the launch of an online store for educational resources. added to the WASSCE remedial program.

Currently, the school runs mornings and evening remedial programmes in WASSCE private exams. Also, it runs evening classes in English Language Proficiency and Adult Education as well as support services such as counseling and personalized tutoring

== School motto ==
The official motto of Ascent Kollege is Fortitudine Vincimus! translated in English as 'By Endurance we Conquer'.

== Programmes ==
Ascent College offers a wide range of programs designed to meet the needs of students of all ages and backgrounds. These programs include:

- International Preparation
- Adult Education Program
- WASSCE Remedial Program
- Pre-SHS Program

== Facilities ==
Ascent Kollege has the following facilities;

- Classrooms
- Hostel Facilities

== See also ==
Ascent College website
