= I-Space =

iSpace or i-Space may refer to:

- i-Space (Chinese company), a private Chinese rocket manufacturer company
- ispace Inc., a publicly traded Japanese lunar exploration company
- I-Space (conceptual framework), a method to classify various types of knowledge
- iSpace Foundation, a technology hub in Ghana, West Africa

== See also ==
- OneSpace, Chinese space company
- 1's-space or 1's place in positional numeral digits
- 1-space or one-dimensional space
