= Open University of West Africa =

Educational institution in Ghana

- Other name: OUWA
- Motto: Learn today. Lead tomorrow
- Type: Private
- Established: November 2011; 14 years ago
- Principal: John Roberts
- Administrative staff: 10
- Students: 279
- Undergraduates: 279
- Location: Accra, Ghana; 5.5586°N 0.1718°W
- Campus: Urban
- Founders: John Roberts and Patrick Steele
- Website: ouwa.org

Open University of West Africa (OUWA) was founded in Ghana in November 2011 by John Roberts and Patrick Steele. With the goal to break the poverty cycle in West Africa through online education, John Roberts and his co-founder were inspired by a simple but contradictory observation: at the moment, higher education penetration in Africa was very low, many of the best universities around the world were beginning to put their courses online through platforms like Coursera, edX, Udacity etc.

The two founders became driven by the idea of harnessing this “perfect storm” of free Open Educational Resources (OER), cheaper access to mobile technology, and the profound need to spur development through higher-ed in West African countries.

== History ==
Located in Ghana, Open University of West Africa (OUWA) provided extremely low-cost education (US$10/year), while also encouraging each student to become an agent of change in this fight. In West Africa, less than 10% of students are enrolled in an institution of higher education, and extreme poverty is a life-threatening reality for many. Despite some efforts by West African governments to expand educational opportunities, there are no tangible improvements in the field of education in this region of Africa. Simple efforts to increase the number of people enrolled in schools have not solved the problem. Without accessibility to quality higher education, there is little hope of students becoming professionals such as business owners, doctors and government officials. Without these industry and community leaders, economic development is almost impossible.

Open University of West Africa attracted numerous potential students. After opening an ‘internet café of education’ in Accra, Ghana, OUWA began with more than 40 students attending the courses. A year and a half into launch, OUWA had around 200 students. This represented the largest concentration of students accessing MOOCs in Sub-Saharan African. The most promising aspect of the small “campus” is that it allowed for the like-minded students, to collaborate with their peers, and they began forming groups together to start venture businesses. This very natural student-led idea became an essential pivot-point for the co-founders leading to the “Educate– Incubate– Invest” business model that was to become the launching point for the next phase of this pioneering “new school”.

== The new model ==
1. Educate: The initial focus for launching OUWA was to deliver higher-ed to those who could not access it through the traditional channels. These unreached students could now access all the necessary study materials and content online for free at an OUWA internet café. There were courses on Entrepreneurship, Computer Science, General education all drawn from Coursera and Udacity.
2. Incubate: As a natural progression of the business classes and venture-minded students, the next step for OUWA was to become a startup incubator. To fuel this environment, events were created and a physical space acquired for co-founders to be matched-up. This next generation focus of creating real world businesses made the incentives for prospective students go far beyond the almost non-existent fees and the availability and ease of access. The incubation component of OUWA's vision consisted of building the West African startup ecosystem. By focusing on incubation, the co-founders were fulfilling their ultimate goal: Fostering Development in W. Africa.
3. Invest: Through events like Startup West Africa (SWA), talented judging panels selected the business ideas with the most potential. Then, seed funding would help launch the startups in exchange for around 10% equity stake to OUWA. These small investments in high potential businesses and top students was paving the way to another necessary goal: Sustainability.

== Notable achievements ==
SliceBiz became one of the most visible start-ups to be launched by OUWA co-founders. One of the largest start-up competitions on the continent, Apps for Africa, selected them to be given $10,000 funding and travel to New York for the opening of NYSE. With the momentum created by these early innovators, Open University of West Africa, along with SliceBiz, spearheaded the creation of HUB Accra, a co-working space devoted solely to helping African-led businesses flourish. A worldwide network of “innovation hubs”, Impact Hub quickly adopted “Impact Hub Accra” as its way to partner in the accelerating startup ecosystem in Accra. They have a space for startups, freelancers, makers, creatives or established businesses looking for a flexible and inspiring space. As a convener in the startup ecosystem, Impact Hub Accra also curates special events and experiences for and with different stakeholders. This hub is a product of the first major pivot that Open University of West Africa undertook.

With a clear vision to reduce and break the cycle of poverty, OUWA contributed to the flourishing of affordable access to quality education not only in the capital city Accra in Ghana. There were learning places in Kumasi and serious attempts to scale to Gambia, Mali, and Burkina. In Gambia, OUWA ran a successful teacher training program with over 20 primary school teachers. In Burkina and Mali, the university elaborated an English as a Foreign Language (EFL) curriculum. The curriculum was designed in such a way that it would truly benefit those who wanted to learn English for academic purposes. In addition to the EFL curriculum program, headways were made in the conception of a physician Assistant program.

== Mobile pilots, scaling and lessons learned ==
While pursuing an OpenIDEO Challenge—an international design and consulting firm based in California—OUWA's next evolution came in the unique form of how to provide education to refugees and improve learning opportunities in refugee camps.

The refugee camps’ program was undertaken as the first mobile pilot. It was carried out in two refugee camps in the Western region of Ghana: Ampain and Krisan. For this pilot, OUWA partnered with École Polytechnique Fédérale de Lausanne (EPFL) a Swiss federal institute revered in entrepreneurship. About 100 refugees, from young to old, participated into the program. Open University of West Africa distributed smartphones pre-loaded with entrepreneurship courses and educational tools tailored to people living in these camps.

This pivot to mobile education in poorer regions turned out to be a major turning point for Open University of West Africa.

Key Learning points discovered while conducting the pilot cleared a new path forward. The pilot highlighted that there was a unique leverage point beyond providing set curriculum designed to usher a student through the standard institutional trajectory. After 4 years of leading OUWA, John Roberts understood that “what’s going to empower the masses is if you can help the person who is selling onions on the side of the road to diversify their products or figure out a value add, they potentially start earning four to five times as much income. The secondary effects from a development perspective can be truly overwhelming. Imagine someone earning a dollar a day suddenly able to earn 4 dollars a day, then they can go to a clinic and access services.” There is immediate benefit when improving the naturally occurring climate of entrepreneurship.

== The End of OUWA, Beginning of InvestED, PBC ==
With the new understanding that scaling is much easier and more effective, in terms of reaching more underprivileged people, through mobile platforms, OUWA gave birth to InvestED. Whereas OUWA's goal was to provide affordable accredited education, InvestED will focus on non-accredited training and lifelong learning. OUWA existed with a mission to bring great education to those who lacked access and leveraged technology by being the last mile delivery system for open educational resources. Although OUWA has recently ceased operations, what was learned during the four years of blazing new trails has fueled the founding of InvestED: an android-based app “to educate struggling entrepreneurs towards financial stability via cutting-edge mobile technology.”
