= University of Engineering and Agricultural Sciences =

Public university in Ghana

- Type: Public
- Established: 2026
- Vice-Chancellor: Prof. Mark Adom-Asamoah
- Location: Bunso, Eastern Region, Ghana
- Website: ueas.edu.gh

The University of Engineering and Agricultural Sciences (UEAS) is a public-funded university in Bunso, Eastern Region, Ghana. It was established by Act 1169 (2026) of the Parliament of Ghana. The institution provides higher education in engineering with special focus on agriculture.

== See also ==
- List of universities in Ghana
