= Emmanuel Agbeko Gamor =

Ghanaian journalist and businessman (b. 1985)

Emmanuel Gamor
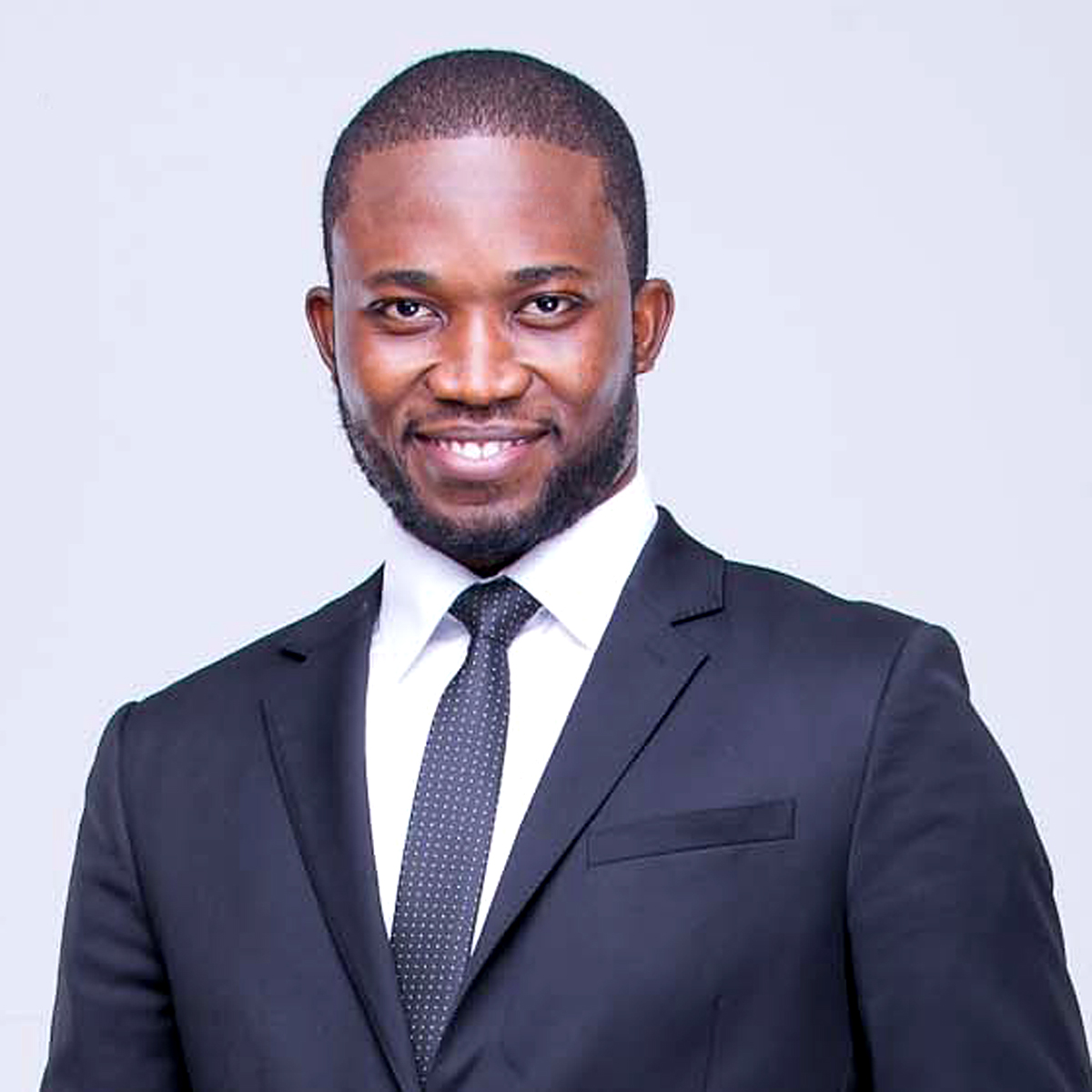
- Emmanuel Gamor
- Born: Emmanuel Agbeko Gamor; December 31, 1985 (age 40); Accra, Ghana
- Education: PRESEC Legon, West Potomac High School, University of Florida, Harvard Business School
- Occupations: Multimedia Journalist and Social Entrepreneur
- Years active: 2009–present

Emmanuel Agbeko Gamor (born 31 December 1985) is a former director at the office of digital and design innovation at Impact Hub Accra. He is a founder for Urithi Labs, a partner for team1000words and is associated with advisory councils of the World Economic Forum. He is an entrepreneur and worked as a multimedia journalist with global media alliance and a presenter for the MPwr Show at Yfm, where he covered stories on youth engagement culture and technology.

== Early life ==
Emmanuel Agbeko Gamor was born in Accra. He had his basic education at Faith Montessori school and his secondary education at Presbyterian Boys' Senior High School. He continued at West Potomac High School in Virginia and then finally attend college at the University of Florida on a full scholarship.

Growing up he loved stories and he enjoyed listening to stories from older family members. Even though he began with political science he was also interested in arts and journalism, and he was excited when his dad offered to get him a dslr camera if he took a journalism course. He subsequently enrolled in a photojournalism class.

== Education ==
While at PRESEC, he studied General Arts. He was on the editorial board and wrote articles under the pseudonym: Inferno. He was also an actor and member of the drama team throughout the 3 years of his stay at the school and was the Best Actor Award Recipient in 2002. From PRESEC, he continued at West Potomac High School, where he was president of the international club, a member of the varsity basketball team, the national honor society and the debate & forensics team.

He later gained a full scholarship to study at the University of Florida where he gained a Bachelor of Arts in Political Science and Minor in Leadership. As a Ronald E. McNair scholar, Emmanuel Gamor received several honors and awards as an undergraduate at the University of Florida. In addition to Florida Blue Key, he served on the University of Florida Homecoming Committee, as a member of the 2007 Preview Staff, on the J. Wayne Reitz Union Board of Managers, as President of Esquire and Polaris of the Gamma Omicron chapter of Iota Phi Theta Besides a Ronald E. Mc Nair Scholar, Emmanuel Gamor is also an alumnus of the Harvard Business School Executive Education.

== Career ==
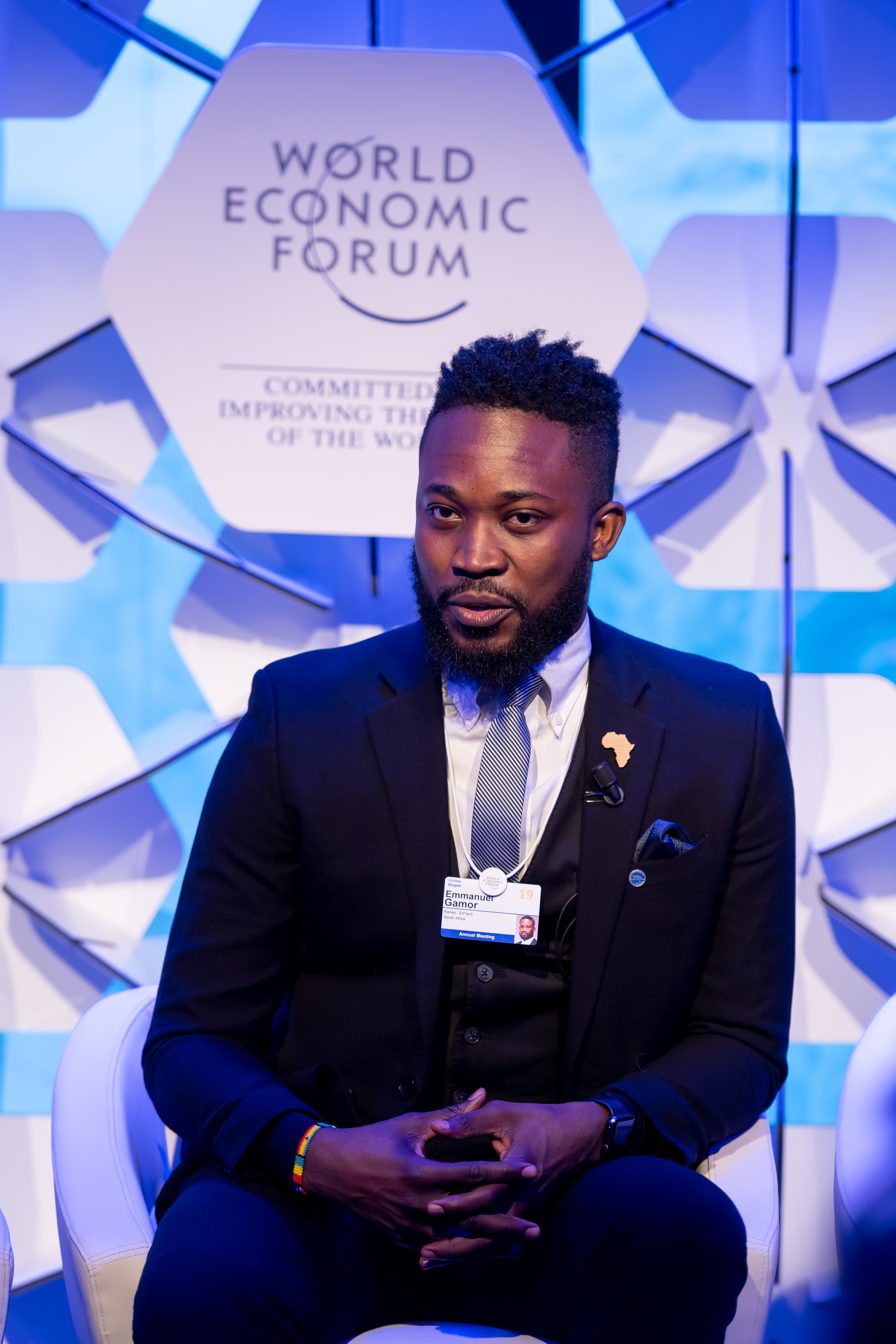
Gamor during the WEF conference in Davos Switzerland in 2019

His love for the arts and his passion for story telling has always been his motivation and influenced his decision to divert from political science to pursue journalism. The constant interaction with individuals from various countries and cultures have shaped how he views the world and has greatly contributed to his success as a multimedia journalist.

Briefly after graduation, he worked his way to becoming the managing editor of a community newspaper in the Washington Metro area. Emmanuel decided to relocate to Ghana in 2012 to spend time with his dad who fell ill and died in 2013.

Emmanuel has led business development and served as multimedia journalist with Global Media Alliance. He is the co-host of a radio program, MPwr show, which engages young African leaders in weekly discussions, highlighting their successes, sharing their challenges, and fostering positive habits among this generation of change-makers.

Emmanuel is the Director for Digital and Design Innovation at the Impact Hub Accra/Broadcasting Board of Governors Innovation Lab in Accra. He is the Founding Executive Director of Urithi Labs, a research-intuitive outfit that uses innovation in media to educate, empower and employ on the African continent.

Emmanuel works as a faculty member with the University of Stellenbosch - Executive Education on digital reputation management, he runs a podcast "Unpacking Africa" that interviews and explores multi-stakeholders in multiple industries across the African continent.

== Volunteer works ==
Emmanuel Gamor is a former Global Shapers Accra Hub Curator for the World Economic Forum. He represented the Global Shapers Accra Hub at the World Economic Forum Annual Meeting in Davos, 2019. He is currently the co-Chair of the World Economic Forum, Global Shapers advisory council on Knowledge and Impact.

Emmanuel volunteers with the Rotary Club of Accra-Ring Road Central and the Rotary Club of Johannesburg respectively.

== Awards and achievements ==
- 2015 MJ Bear Fellows Honorable Mention (ONA '15 Under-30 Digital Journalism Stand-Outs)
- 2014 "Success Story powered by the Web" Google Africa Connected (Education Category) Feature
- 2014 Awarded "Best Male Blogger 2014", Ghana Social Media Awards
- 2014 Nominated "Best Blog" & "Best Male Blogger" Categories, Ghana Social Media Awards
- 2013 Notable Alumnus, African American Studies, College of Liberal Arts & Sciences
