= List of botanical gardens in Ghana =

Botanical gardens in Ghana have collections consisting entirely of Ghana native and endemic species; most have a collection that includes plants from around the world. There are botanical gardens and arboreta in all states and territories of Ghana. Most are administered by local governments, some are privately owned.

- Aburi Botanical Gardens
- Bunso Arboretum
