= AUCC =

AUCC may refer to:

- Universities Canada, an organisation that represents colleges and universities of Canada
- African University College of Communications, a private tertiary institution at Adabraka, Accra, Ghana
- African Union Conference Center and Office Complex, a building in Addis Ababa, Ethiopia that serves as the headquarters of the African Union
