= Regional Maritime University =

Private university in Nungua, in the Greater Accra region, Ghana

Coordinates: 5.6075°N 0.0639°W

- Motto: Centre of Excellence
- Type: Private
- Established: 26 May 1983; 43 years ago as Regional Maritime Academy, 2007; 19 years ago as Regional Maritime University
- Affiliations: University of Ghana
- Location: Nungua, Greater Accra Region, Ghana
- Campus: Urban area
Colours
Medium blue, Black and White
- Website: https://www.rmu.edu.gh
- Location within Ghana

The Regional Maritime University (RMU) is an international tertiary institution and private university in Nungua in the Greater Accra Region, Ghana. It attained full university status on 25 October 2007 and was launched as such by John Agyekum Kufuor, former President of the Republic of Ghana. It was called Nautical college and later changed to Regional maritime Academy.

== History ==
On 1 October 1982, the Government of Ghana promulgated the Regional Maritime Law 1982, which was followed by the signing of the instrument of transfer, handing over the college to the then Ministerial Conference of West and Central African States on Maritime Transport (MINCONMAR), now known as Maritime Organization of West and Central Africa (MOWCA), which negotiated for its regionalization.

The college was then renamed the Regional Maritime Academy (RMA). The formal inauguration of the RMA took place 26 May 1983, with Ghana as a founding member.

Regionalization of the academy was for cooperation, particularly with regard to the training of personnel to ensure the sustained growth and development of maritime industries in the sub-region and beyond. The academy in Ghana serves the Anglophone countries while a sister academy in Ivory Coast (L'Académie Régionale des Sciences et Techniques de la Mer – ARSTM) serves the Francophone countries.

== Organization ==
The Regional Maritime University is an international tertiary institution and private university founded by the Republics of Cameroon, The Gambia, Ghana, Liberia and Sierra Leone..

The RMU occupies the premises of the old Ghana Nautical College which was established in 1958 to train ratings for the erstwhile State Shipping Corporation (Black Star Line). On 1 October 1982, the Government of Ghana promulgated the Regional Maritime Law 1982 which was followed by the signing of the instrument of transfer, handing over the college to the then Ministerial Conference of West and Central African States on Maritime Transport (MINCONMAR), now known as Maritime Organization of West and Central Africa (MOWCA), which negotiated for its regionalization. The college was then renamed the Regional Maritime Academy (RMA).

The overall objective for the establishment of RMU was to promote regional co-operation in the maritime industry, focusing on the training to ensure the sustained growth and development of the industry. The RMU is a branch of the World Maritime University, Malmö, Sweden, and an affiliate of the University of Ghana, in Legon.

The university has working relations with other universities in the sub-region. The RMA has since December, 2004 been given institutional accreditation by the National Accreditation Board, Ghana.

== See also ==
- List of universities in Ghana
