= Ghana Tertiary Education Commission =

National Accreditation Board, Ghana
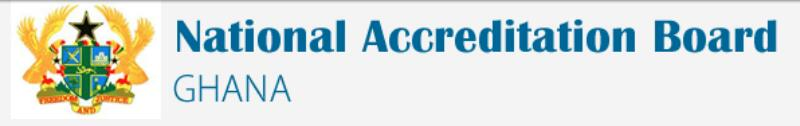

Agency overview
- Formed: 1993
- Dissolved: 2020
- Superseding agency: Ghana Tertiary Education Commission (GTEC)
- Jurisdiction: Republic of Ghana
- Headquarters: Ghana
- Minister responsible: Professor D. A. Akyeampong, Chairman
- Parent agency: Ministry of Education (Ghana)
- Website: Official website

The National Accreditation Board (NAB) was a Government of Ghana agency responsible for the regulation, supervision, and accreditation of tertiary institutions in Ghana from 1993 until its dissolution in 2020. It operated as an agency under the Ministry of Education. Under the Education Regulatory Bodies Act, 2020 (Act 1023), the agency was formally dissolved and its functions were merged into the Ghana Tertiary Education Commission (GTEC).

== Establishments ==
The board was formed in 1993. Its formation was promoted by the 1991 Government white paper on Reforms to the Tertiary Education System of Ghana. The recommendation stated that the Board be formed to:

- contribute to the furtherance of better management of tertiary education
- serve as the Quality Assurance body at the tertiary education level.

=== 2020 dissolution and transition to GTEC ===
In August 2020, the Parliament of Ghana passed the Education Regulatory Bodies Act, 2020 (Act 1023), designed to eliminate administrative overlaps in high-level academic tracking. Under this legal framework, the National Accreditation Board and the National Council for Tertiary Education (NCTE) were formally integrated on 25 November 2020 to establish the unified Ghana Tertiary Education Commission (GTEC).

Professor Ahmed Jinapor Abdulai, who served as the foundational Deputy Director-General and later Acting Director-General, oversees operations as the agency's Director-General. Under this leadership, the commission transitioned from legacy paper filings to digital tracking, implementing systems such as the Accreditation Management Information System (AMIS) to process academic validations.

In February 2026, the commission temporarily halted the granting of accreditation to new General Nursing undergraduate pathways, advising institutions to focus on building specialized post-basic nursing programs instead.

== Accredited Public and Private Institutions ==
=== Public Universities ===
- University of Ghana
- Kwame Nkrumah University of Science and Technology (KNUST)
- University of Cape Coast
- University of Education, Winneba
- University for Development Studies
- University of Energy and Natural Resources
- University of Health and Allied Sciences
- Ghana Institute of Management and Public Administration, GIMPA
- University of Mines and Technology
- University of Professional Studies (UPSA)
- University of Business and Integrated Development Studies
- University of Technology and Applied Sciences, Navrongo
- University of Skills training and Entrepreneur Development, Kumasi

=== Private Universities ===
- Academic City University
- Accra Institute of Technology
- Advanced Business College
- African University College of Communication
- All Nations University College
- Almond Institute
- Anglican University College of Technology
- Ashesi University College
- BlueCrest College
- Catholic Institute of Business and Technology
- Catholic University College of Ghana
- College of Science, Arts and Education
- Central University
- Christ Apostolic University College
- Christian Service University College
- Community College
- Data Link Institute
- Dominion University College
- Ensign College of Public Health
- Entrepreneurship Training Institute
- Regional Maritime University
- Evangelical Presbyterian University College
- Fountainhead Christian College
- Garden City University College
- Ghana Baptist University College
- Ghana Christian University College
- Bmfi university college
- Ghana Technology University College
- Heritage Christian University College (HCUC)
- Good News Theological Seminary
- Institute of Business Management and Journalism
- Institute of Development and Technology Management
- Islamic University College
- Jayee University College
- Joyce Ababio College of Creative Design
- KAAF University College
- Kings University College
- Knutsford College
- Lancaster University, Ghana Campus
- Laweh Open University College
- Maranatha University College
- Marshalls College
- Meridian University College
- Methodist University College
- Millar Institute For Transdisciplinary and Development Studies
- Mountcrest University College
- Pan African Christian University College
- Pentecost University College
- Presbyterian University College
- Radford University College
- Regent University College of Science and Technology
- S S Peter and Paul Pastoral and Social Institute
- Spiritan University College
- St. Nicholas Seminary
- St. Margaret College
- University College of Agriculture and Environmental Studies
- University College of Management Studies
- University of Applied Management
- Webster University
- Akim State College (University College)
- West End University College
- Wisconsin International University College, Ghana
- Yeshua Institute of Technology
- Zenith University College
- Valley View University

== Fake Credentials ==
The Ghana Tertiary Commission over the recent years have stood on their grounds exposing Ghanaians with fake certificates or credentials working in various public institutions. With this, University of Environment and Sustainable Development located in Somanya of Eastern Region, one of Ghana's universities was forced to dismiss it's internal auditor for possession of fake credentials. Mr. Emmanuel Opoku Ware was the university's internal auditor whose credentials were found questionable. Mr. Emmanuel Opoku Ware has previously worked at the for 3 years before his credentials were found questionable and later dismissed by GTEC. His expose came after the university council ordered for vetting of credentials of senior staff of the university.

The vetting was conducted in 2024, and during the vetting, another senior staff member by name, Issac Abbam, Director of Physical Development and Estate Management was founded to possess a questionable qualification.

Both of them had their appointments in 2020, during the initial recruitment phase of the university after it had been inaugurated the same year.
