= Accra Institute of Technology =

Private higher-education institution in Ghana

Accra Institute of Technology (AIT)
- Motto: Service, Leadership, Scholarship
- Type: Private
- Established: 2009; 17 years ago
- Affiliations: Kwame Nkrumah University of Science and Technology; Open University Malaysia
- President: Professor Clement K. Dzidonu
- Students: 2,450
- Location: Accra, Greater Accra Region, Ghana; 5°33′58″N 0°15′41″W
- Campus: Urban
- Colours: Dark blue and Light blue
- Website: www.ait.edu.gh
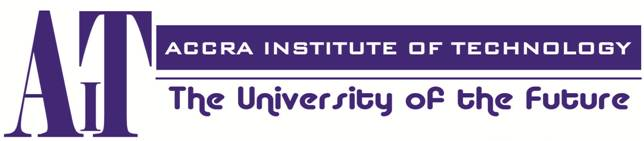

The Accra Institute of Technology (AIT), is an independent technology-focused research university based in Accra, Ghana. The university comprises six schools and three institutes.

AIT is equally a leading research university in Ghana with over 250 enrolled on its PhD programs.

== Accreditation ==
AIT is accredited by the National Accreditation Board (Ghana), of the Ministry of Education in Ghana to offer campus-based and open university programs in various fields. The campus-based programs are offered at the undergraduate level in engineering, computer science, information technology and business administration.

== Collaborations, affiliations, and partnerships ==
=== Academic ===
- Kwame Nkrumah University of Science and Technology (KNUST)
- Massachusetts Institute of Technology (MIT), USA
- Open University Malaysia
- AIT Learning Management System forming part of LEMSAS formally known as LeMASS – an online academic program delivery and administrative system
- MIT OpenCourseware system – provide access to lecture notes, handouts and other learning resources of 1800 courses offered at MIT OpenCourseWare
- Open University Malaysia (OUM) Learning Management System – myLMS hosting learning materials and resources to be accessed by AIT students registered on the OUM programs and
- AIT-Online – E-University learning support resources

=== Industrial ===
- Council for Scientific and Industrial Research – Ghana
- Ministry of Communications, Ghana
- Office of the Head of the Civil Service, Ghana
- The Ghana Civil Aviation Authority
- OMATEK Computers (Nigeria)

== See also ==
- List of universities in Ghana
