= Ghana Baptist Convention =

Baptist Christian denomination in Ghana

- Classification: Evangelical Christianity
- Theology: Baptist
- Associations: Baptist World Alliance
- Headquarters: Accra, Ghana
- Origin: 1963
- Congregations: 1,346
- Members: 99,988
- Hospitals: 2
- Tertiary institutions: Ghana Baptist University College
- Official website: ghanabaptistconvention.com

The Ghana Baptist Convention is a Baptist Christian denomination in Ghana. It is affiliated with the Baptist World Alliance. The headquarters is in Accra.

== History ==
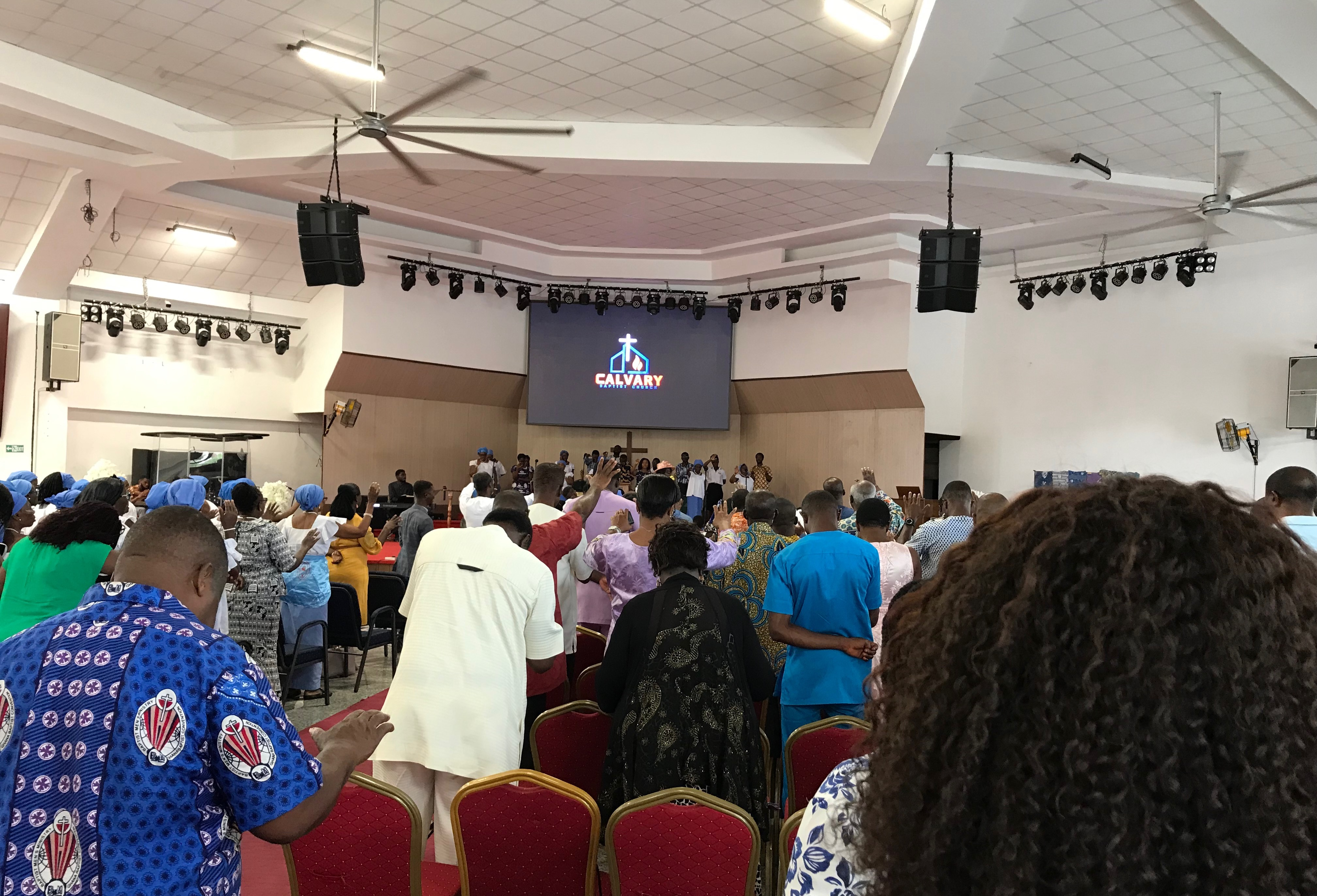
Worship service at Calvary Baptist Church - Shiashie in Accra.

The Ghana Baptist Convention has its origins in a Baptist mission of Nigerian Baptist Convention in 1927 in Kumasi. It is officially founded in 1963 as the Ghana Baptist Conference. In 1964, it became autonomous from the Nigerian Baptist Convention and take the name of Ghana Baptist Convention.

According to a census published by the association in 2023, it claimed 1,346 churches and 99,988 members.

== Media ==
It founded the Shalom Broadcasting Network (SBN TV) in 2018.

== Schools ==
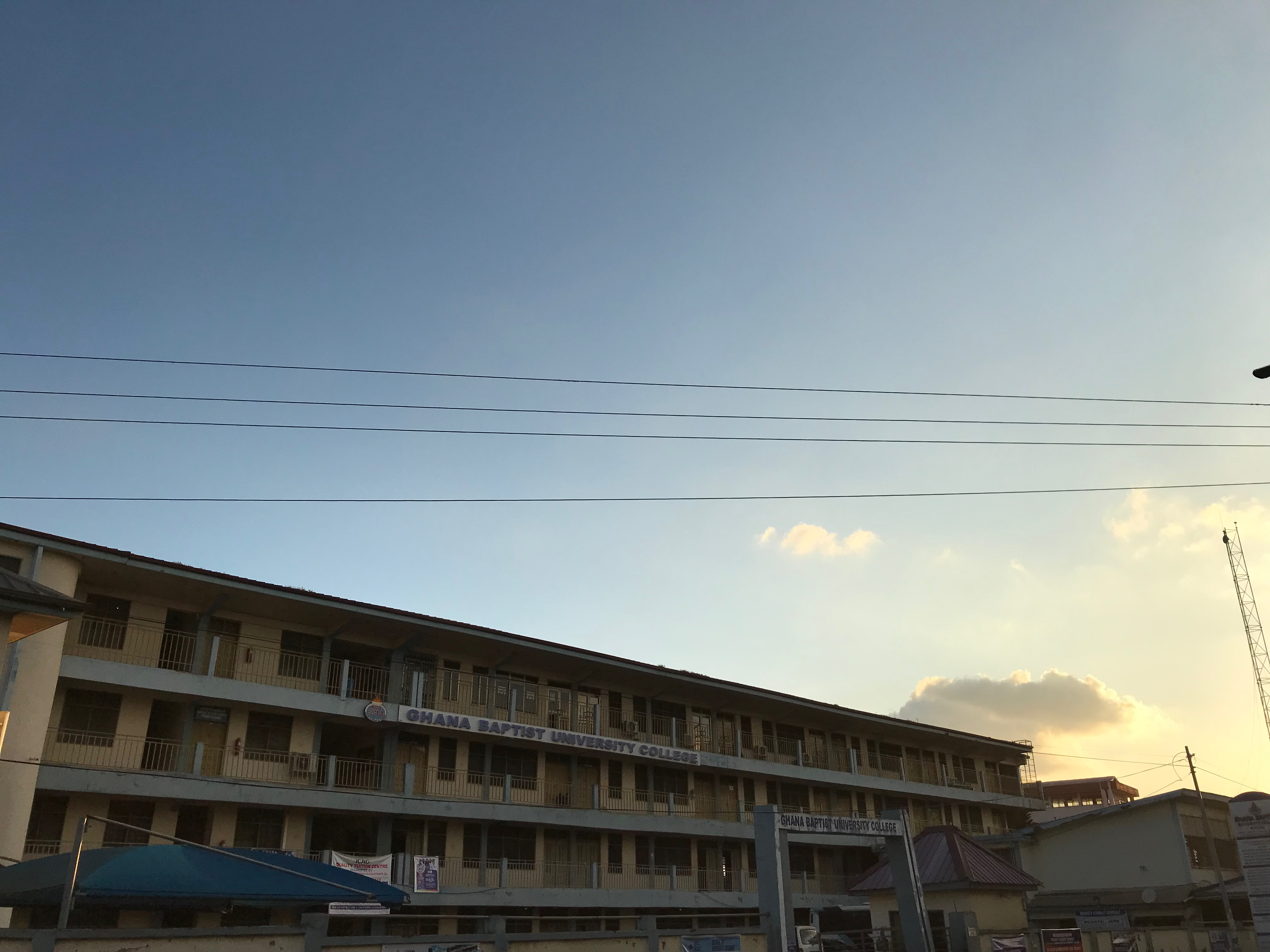
Ghana Baptist University College in Kumasi.

In 2006, it establishes the Ghana Baptist University College in Kumasi.

== Health Services ==
It founded the Baptist Medical Center in Nalerigu in 1958. In 2018, it opened a hospital in the Jomoro District, in Western Region (Ghana).

== See also ==
- Bible
- Born again
- Baptist beliefs
- Jesus Christ
- Believers' Church
