= James D. Blankenbecler =

American soldier (b. 1963, d. 2003)

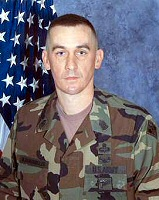
- Born: June 27, 1963; Arlington County, Virginia
- Died: October 1, 2003; Samarra, Iraq
- Branch: United States Army
- Rank: Command Sergeant Major

James D. Blankenbecler (June 27, 1963 – October 1, 2003) was an American command sergeant major and the highest-ranking enlisted soldier to be killed by hostile fire in the Iraq War.

== Early life and education ==
Blankenbecler was born on June 27, 1963, in Arlington County, Virginia. Blankenbecler grew up in Northern Virginia and attended Groveton High School (now West Potomac High School).

== Military career ==
Blankenbecler joined the United States Army in 1983 and served during the Gulf War and at Fort Belvoir.

In 2003, Blankenbecler was assigned to the 1st Battalion, 44th Air Defense Artillery Regiment at Fort Hood, Texas and deployed to Iraq.

== Death and legacy ==
Blankenbecler died on October 1, 2003, in Samarra, Iraq, due to injuries sustained after being in convoy that was "hit by an improvised explosive device and rocket-propelled grenades".

In 2005, a bill was passed by the Virginia General Assembly to honor Blankenbecler.

In 2014, the CSM James D. Blankenbecler Resilience Center was opened and dedicated in Blankenbecler's name.

In 2018, West Potomac High School held a Veteran's Day of Service to honor Blankenbecler.
