= Albert Acquah =

Ghanaian-American educationist

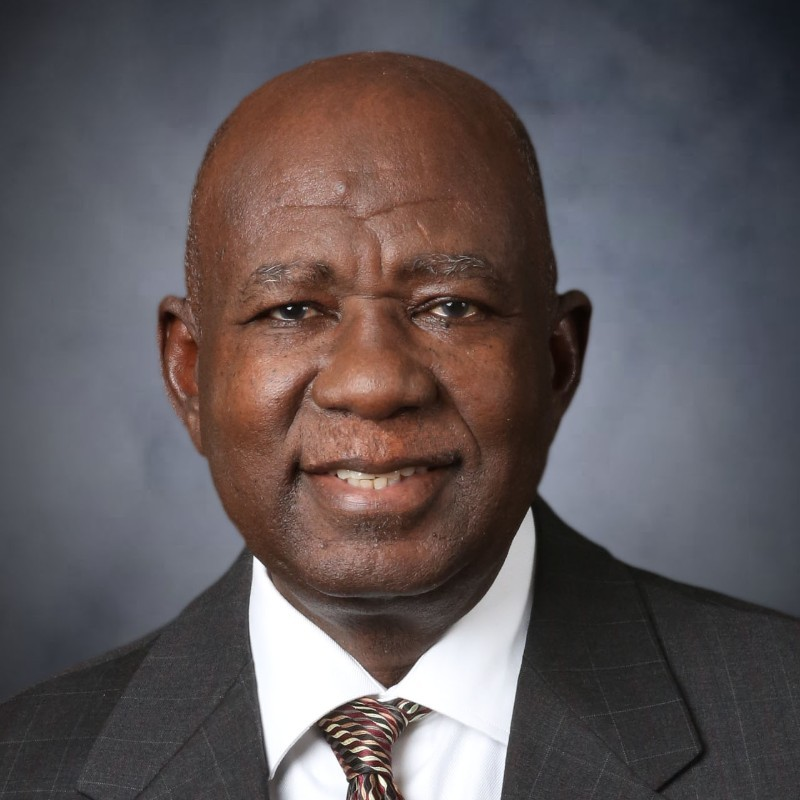
- Born: Ghana
- Education: Kwame Nkrumah University of Science and Technology (B.A. Social Sciences); Ohio University (M.A. Economics, 1983)
- Occupations: Entrepreneur, Educationist, Public Accountant
- Years active: 2001–present
- Known for: Founder and Chancellor of Garden City University, Kenyase, Kumasi
- Title: Chancellor, Garden City University

Albert Acquah is a Ghanaian-American educationist and certified professional accountant. He is the founder and chancellor of Garden City University College (GCUC), a private university located in Kumasi, Ghana. Acquah founded the institution in 2001 and has served in various administrative roles since its establishment.

== Early life and education ==
Albert Acquah holds degrees in social sciences from Kwame Nkrumah University of Science and Technology, and a Master of Arts degree in economics from Ohio University, completed in 1983. He is a certified professional accountant and worked in the United States for several years before returning to Ghana, where he founded a higher education institution.

== Career ==
In 2001, Acquah founded the College of Information Technology and Management Systems, initially established as an ICT training center in Kumasi. The institution was later renamed Garden City University College (GCUC) and received accreditation as a tertiary institution in 2004. It later expanded its academic offerings to include programs in health sciences, business, applied sciences, and communication studies.

GCUC received a Presidential Charter in December 2024, formally presented in January 2025. The charter grants the university autonomy to award its own degrees, marking its transition from a university college to an autonomous university.

Acquah has also advocated for increased support for private universities in Ghana, including calls for the government to extend funding mechanisms such as the Ghana Education Trust Fund (GETFund) to qualified private institutions.
