= Slackdaddy =

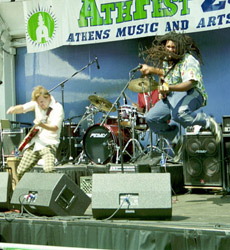

Background information
- Origin: Athens, Georgia, by way of Alexandria, Virginia, all 3 members. All 3 went to West Potomac Highschool United States
- Years active: 1995 - 2003
- Label: Roundtable Records
- Members: Andrew McCain (guitar/lead vocals); Bryan J. Howard (bass guitar); Ian Werden (drums)
- Website: Official website

Slackdaddy is a three-piece rock/alternative/indy band from Alexandria, Virginia, USA, consisting of Andrew McCain on guitar/vocals, Bryan J. Howard on bass guitar and Ian Werden on drums.

== Early years ==
The band began in Alexandria, Virginia, a suburb of Washington, DC in the late 1980s. McCain and Howard had been friends since early childhood and played together in the Mt. Vernon Old Guard Fife and Drum Corps, which Howard led. Later, while attending West Potomac High School, Howard befriended Werden who had recently moved to Alexandria from Detroit. The two played together in several short-lived bands, notably The Clockmen and Frankly Scarlett, with the guitarist Alex Lane. In 1989, Howard and Werden joined St. Stephens students McCain and Luke Taylor to form The Moorish Idylls. The band frequently played the "Open Mike Coffeehouse", a monthly gathering at the Mt. Vernon Unitarian Church, which featured local acoustic bands and soloists. The Moorish Idylls were the first band to play "electric" at the Coffeehouse. After the four band members had graduated from high school and attended separate universities, The Moorish Idylls played only a few shows. One notable gig was the first Cecilfest on July 10, 1993, where several new songs were debuted, indicating a new musical direction for the band.

In autumn 1994, Howard's stepfather Harvard told him about his good friend from his 1950s army days whose nickname was Slackdaddy. Slackdaddy was known to be quite flirtatious and popular with women, yet as a married man, he never committed adultery. During an argument with his wife, who was convinced that he had cheated, she shot him dead. Howard was so moved by this "patron saint of misunderstood men" that he decided to rename the band Slackdaddy. It was also around this time that rhythm guitarist Luke Taylor left the band, leaving Slackdaddy as a power-trio.

During summer 1995, the band played several shows in the Washington area, including several at Jenkin's Hill, a basement bar near the U.S. Capitol on Pennsylvania Avenue. On December 31, 1995, Slackdaddy played the Laughing Lizard in Old Town Alexandria.

== Career ==
In 1996, the band decided to move to Athens, Georgia, noted for its lively underground scene. Playing many well-known clubs in the area, the group gained enough popularity to tour. They also hosted the 1997 Shanti Festival at their house in Comer, GA. For two years, 1996–2001, they toured the southeast. Their debut first album, Is, was released in February 1998, on Roundtable Records. This success eventually lead to a 1999 nationwide tour. On January 15, 2000, they joined Dr. Madd Vibe (Angelo Moore from Fishbone) on stage for an impromptu jam. In 2001, their second album, Supercell, was released. Slackdaddy then released its last album in 2004, Karmageddon, which is available as a free download on the Slackdaddy website.

== Current status ==
The band has not recorded since 2003, when McCain left to finish his master's degree. This eventually led to his marriage and a child. The future of the band is unknown at this time. The band has played just a few shows since 2003. On March 12, 2004, the band played Caledonia Lounge in Athens which was recorded on video and can be viewed on the Slackdaddy website.

Howard now leads a band called The HEAP and often plays bass for Cracker.

On April 20, 2013 Slackdaddy reunited to play the Melting Pot in Athens, GA. The night was a birthday celebration for Howard, who was turning 40.

== Albums ==
=== Major releases ===
- Is
- Supercell
- Karmageddon

=== Compilations ===
- Athfest 1999
- Loving the Ailen
- Athfest 2001
- Yearbook
- All About Numbers

== Band members ==
- Andrew McCain on guitar/vocals
- Bryan J. Howard on bass guitar
- Ian Werden on drums
