= University College of Management Studies =

Private higher-education institution in Ghana

- Type: Private
- Established: 1974; 52 years ago
- Chairman: Dr. Sazrar Opata
- Location: Accra, Ghana; Kumasi, Ghana; 5.5467°N 0.3383°W
- Campus: Suburban area
- Website: UCOMS Website

The University College of Management Studies is a private university college in Accra and Kumasi, Ghana. The school is affiliated with the School of Business of Kwame Nkrumah University of Science and Technology, Kumasi and the University of Education Winneba, Kumasi Campus.

== Establishment ==
The university was formed from the Institute of Management Studies. The institute was established in 1974 and served as a tutorial school for candidates for professional qualifications in Marketing from the Chartered Institute of Marketing, Accounting from the Association of Chartered Certified Accountants and Purchasing and Supply from the Chartered Institute of Purchasing & Supply.

== Departments ==
University College of Management Studies has 3 main departments; namely, Accounting, Finance & Marketing, Human Resource Management and Procurement & Supply Chain Management Departments.

=== Department of Accounting, Finance & Marketing ===
This Department offers a first Degree program in the areas of Accounting, Banking & Finance and Marketing.

==== Bsc. Accounting ====
The program consists of the following courses:

- Financial Accounting I-IV,
- Taxation
- Cost Accounting I & II
- Auditing & Assurance
- International Accounting
- Financial Reporting & Analysis
- Company & Partnership Law
- Management Accounting
- Managerial Economics
- Research Methods

==== Bsc. Banking & Finance ====
Some of the courses offered under this program include:

- Economics in Banking
- Monetary & Financial Systems
- Business Finance I & II
- Law Relating to Banking
- Investments
- Practice of Banking I & II
- Marketing of Financial Services
- Banking Operations & Ethics
- Managerial Economics
- Finance of International Trade
- Business Ethics
- Managerial Accounting
- Managerial Economics
- Entrepreneurship

==== Bsc. Marketing ====
Some of the courses offered include:

- Marketing Management
- Marketing of Services
- Marketing Environment
- New Product Development
- Sales Management
- Retail Marketing Management
- Strategic Marketing Management: Planning Control
- Integrated Marketing Communications
- Marketing Research
- Organizational Re-Engineering
- Business Ethics
- Managerial Accounting
- Managerial Economics
- Entrepreneurship

=== Department of Human Resource Management ===
This Department offers the following courses:

- Human Resource Training Development
- Industrial Psychology
- Human Behaviour in Organization
- Appraisal & Performance Management
- Human Resource Information System
- Strategic Human Resource Management
- Labour Economics
- Managerial Economics
- Business Organisation
- Employment Laws & Practice
- Human Resource Management
- Entrepreneurship
- Industrial Relations & Labour Law
- Business Ethics

=== Department of Procurement and Supply Chain Management ===
Courses offered in this Department include:

- Monitoring & Evaluation of Procurement Systems
- Procurement Planning & Budgetary Control I & II
- Research Methods
- Process & Procedures of Public Sector Procurement
- Supply & Material Management
- Business Organization & Process
- Project & Contract Management
- International Management
- Strategic Procurement
- Tactics & Operations in Purchasing & Supply
- Physical Distribution & Transportation
- Legal Aspect of Procurement
- Managerial Economics
- Business Analysis in Procurement
- Logistics Management
- Business Ethics
- Managerial Accounting
- Entrepreneurship

== Accreditation ==
The university is accredited by the National Accreditation Board in 1998.

== Affiliations ==
The university in May 2011, was formally affiliated with the Kwame Nkrumah University of Science and Technology.

== See also ==
List of universities in Ghana
