= West Potomac High School =

High school in Fairfax County, Virginia

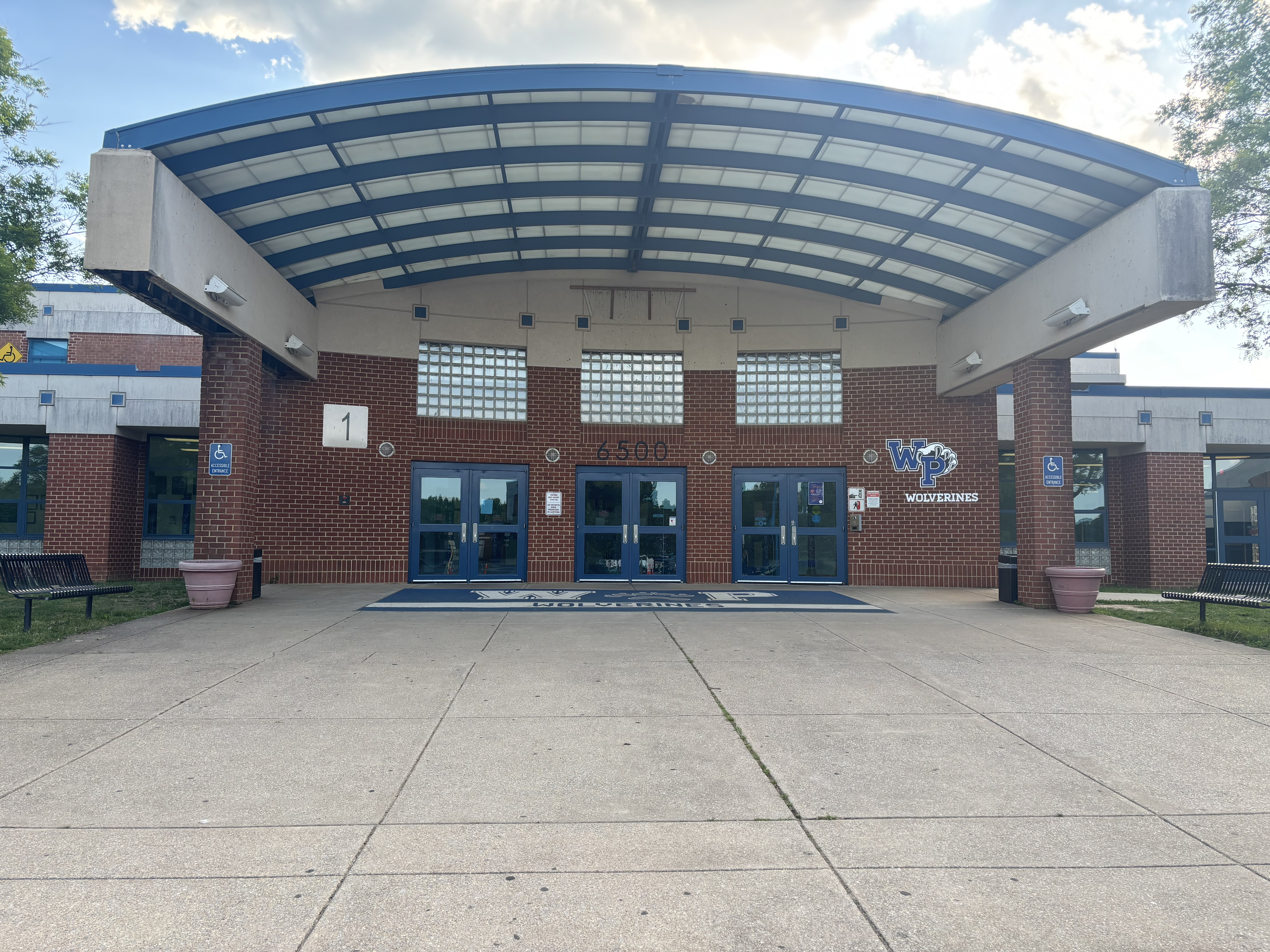
- Entrance of West Potomac High School

Location
- 6500 Quander Road; Alexandria, Virginia 22307; 38°46′28″N 77°04′20″W

Information
- School type: Public, high school
- Motto: "Ad Astra Per Aspera" (To the Stars through Struggles)
- Founded: 1985
- School district: Fairfax County Public Schools
- Principal: Jessica Statz
- Staff: 295 (2021)
- Grades: 9-12
- Enrollment: 2,643 (2024)
- Language: English
- Campus: Suburban
- Colors: Royal Blue and silver ██
- Mascot: Wolverine
- Feeder schools: Sandburg Middle School
- Rival schools: Mount Vernon High School; Alexandria City High School
- Athletic conferences: Class 6 Region C Patriot District
- Website: http://www.fcps.edu/WestPotomacHS

West Potomac High School, formerly Groveton High School, is a public high school in the Alexandria area of Fairfax County, Virginia. It was founded in 1985 and is part of the Fairfax County Public Schools district.

== History ==
West Potomac High School was formed by combining the student bodies and staff of Groveton and Fort Hunt High Schools in 1985. The Fairfax County School Board, citing costs and declining enrollment as causes, decided to close Fort Hunt and combine the schools on Groveton's site under a new name.

The school's facilities have been significantly expanded since the merger, with two wings added to the main building over the intervening years. The old Groveton High School on Popkins Lane (opened in 1956) houses the Bryant Alternative High School; the site of Fort Hunt High school (opened in 1963) became Carl Sandburg Middle School, which is the middle school that feeds into West Potomac. The new Groveton High School was built on the site of the former Bryant Intermediate School and opened in 1976.

In its inaugural year, the school adopted the motto "The Tradition Begins Now." After several years, it was modified to "Excellence is a Tradition". A rivalry with neighboring Mount Vernon High School exists because of their close proximity. Historically Groveton and Ft. Hunt were rivals, Groveton also was an athletic rival with nearby T. C. Williams High School (now named Alexandria City High School) in Alexandria; their football games for a very long time were only scheduled on Saturday afternoons rather than Friday nights partly because the field at T.C. Williams had no lights. The 1971 Groveton vs T.C. Williams game was portrayed in the movie Remember the Titans.

The West Potomac school mascot is a wolverine. The school's colors are blue, white, and silver.

=== 2025 stabbing ===
On April 23, 2025, a physical altercation between two students at West Potomac would occur, leading one of the students, an unnamed 15-year-old, to pull a knife out of his pocket, before stabbing the other student, an unnamed 16-year-old, leaving him with life-threatening injuries. As a result of the stabbing, the school installed permanent weapon scanners.

== Demographics ==
In the 2017–18 school year, West Potomac High School's student body was 38.65% White, 16.31% Black, 34.76% Hispanic or Latino, 6.75% Asian and 3.53% Other.

In the 2022-2023 school year, West Potomac High School's student body was 40.22% Hispanic or Latino, 33.38% White, 15.91% Black, 6.01% Asian, 4.48% Other.

== Sports ==
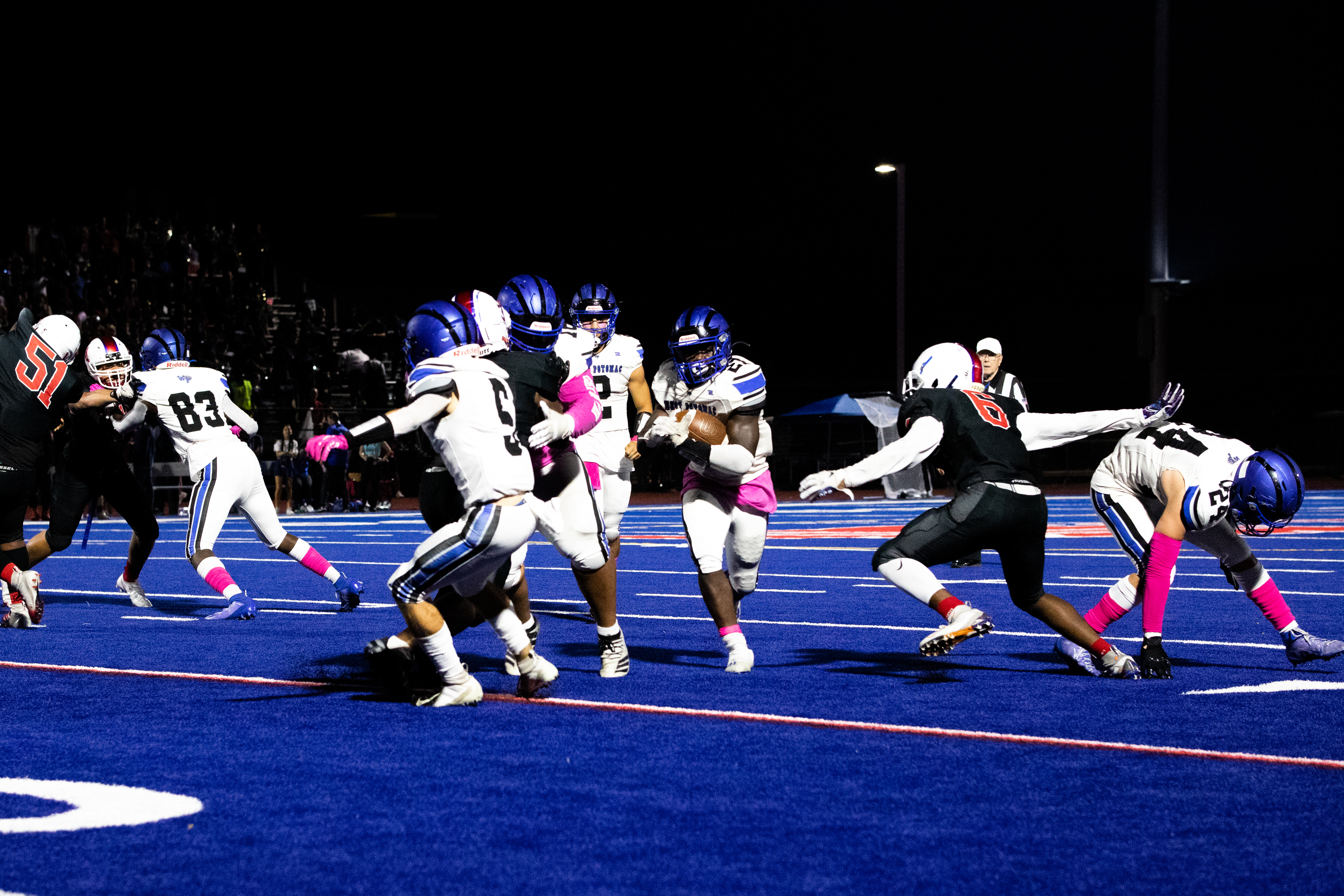
West Potomac (in white) playing against Alexandria City High School (in black)

In the 2003 season, the Boys and Girls Crew team had their 1st and 2nd 4 man boat place 1st in the Virginia state championship.

In the 2004–05 season, the Boys Track team won the regional title. In the 2008–09 season, the Boys Track team remained the AAA Patriot District champions for the 8th year in a row, while the Girls Track team moved up to the second place standing, behind Lake Braddock Secondary School.

West Potomac won Virginia AAA football championships in 1989 and 1990. The Wolverines also won state championships in Girls Cross Country in 1989 and 1990. The West Potomac It's Academic team won first place in the Patriot District and fourth in the region in January 2008.

In 2011, the Girls Varsity Field Hockey team advanced to regionals for the first time in years after a victory over W.T. Woodson High School in the first round of playoffs. The Varsity Football team was the Patriot District champion and advanced several rounds into regionals before a marginal loss to Westfield High School.

In 2012, the school's Dance Team qualified for the National Dance Association competition in Orlando, Florida. The Boys Tennis team advanced to the Northern Region Quarterfinal for the first time in 20 years. The Girls Varsity Lacrosse team advanced several rounds into regionals before losing to Centreville High School in the Northern Region Quarterfinal.

In 2013, senior Will Rupp won the Virginia State AAA Wrestling Championship for the 220 lb weight class, becoming the first student at West Potomac to win a state championship in wrestling since 1987.

In 2014, West Potomac finished the reconstruction of the main football field and surrounding practice fields, which are now artificial turf.

In 2015, the school's Boys Soccer team won the Patriot district for the first time.

In the 2015 rowing season, the Girls Crew team had their JV4+ boat place 1st in the Virginia Scholastic Rowing Association of America (VASRA) State Championship on May 9, 2015 in Occoquan, Virginia to become State Champions.

West Potomac is currently part of the VHSL and its current alignment is Class 6, Region C, Gunston District.

== Academic honors ==
The West Potomac Science Olympiad team placed 9th at the 2010 Virginia State Tournament with individual event-teams winning 3rd Place in Mission Possible and a 5th Place in Disease Detectives. And since the school's founding in 1985, West Potomac has fielded 3 state championship debate teams. In 2009 a student was 2nd in the AIAA/NCS Aerospace(Science Fair) awards and a West Potomac sophomore won a top award at the 2010 Fairfax County Regional Science and Engineering Fair. At the 2009-2010 VHSL State Debate Tournament a duo-team were named Semi-Finalists in the Virginia State Debate Tournament/Classic(AAA) Division.

== West Potomac Academy ==
West Potomac offers classes in health and medical sciences, communication and the arts, and human services through the West Potomac Academy. The West Potomac Academy is one of six academy programs within Fairfax County Public Schools and prepares students for post-secondary education and the workforce with a focus on their intended field.

In May 2013, the Virginia Department of Education awarded West Potomac Academy with the designation of Governor's Health Science Academy.

== Music ==
In recent years, West Potomac has been a recipient of the Virginia Honor Band award from the Virginia Band and Orchestra Director's Association for superior ratings in concert band and marching band. Also the West Potomac Symphonic Winds attended the Bands of America event in Indianapolis in March 2010, accompanied by the West Potomac Percussion Ensemble. West Potomac also attended Music for All in Indianapolis in March 2026.

== Theatre ==
Beyond the Page Theatre Company is the name of West Potomac's theatre department. Its declared mission is "to bring the very best of high school theatre to the West Potomac community." Since its formation its productions have both been nominated and have received numerous awards as part of the Cappies program. Typically, the Beyond the Page Theatre Company performs three mainstage shows each year, a small musical in the fall, a play in the winter, and a big musical in the spring. In addition to presenting three mainstage productions, the company also holds a non-competitive One-Acts festival every year to showcase the theatre classes. All mainstage productions are directed by the company's director, Phillip Lee Clark, and the one acts are mostly student directed. The Beyond the Page Theatre Company typically participates in the annual Virginia High School League's One-Act Festival (or VHSL) and the Virginia Theatre Association Conference (commonly known as VTAs).

In the summer of 2013, the company participated in the Capital Fringe Festival and performed an original, student written piece, "Urban Legends." In 2013, the company took its production of "Avenue Q" to VTA's and received an Honorable Mention and an award for Best Ensemble. The company performed their interpretation of "The Tempest" in the annual High School Folger Festival In 2014, The company was nominated to participate in the American High School Theatre Festival as part of the highly acclaimed Edinburgh Festival Fringe. In addition to presenting One Acts Festivals and mainstage productions, they hold monthly improv competitions and have their own team called "The Great Whales." In the 2013–2014 season, the team was undefeated. In 2015, the school became only the second in the country to stage Green Day's "American Idiot."

== Student publications ==
West Potomac's student publications include the school's news magazine, The Wire, and its online news website thewpwire.org, the award-winning school yearbook, The Predator, and the school's literary art magazine, Syzygy.

=== The Wire ===
The Wire is a student-run school news source consisting of a news magazine and an online news site, which are funded by ads and patrons. The publication includes information about current events in the school and the county, an opinion section, an arts and entertainment section, a sports section, and a satire section called The String. The Wire was founded and published its first issue in West Potomac's inaugural year, 1985.

=== The Predator ===
The Predator, West Potomac's award-winning yearbook, is distributed at the conclusion of every school year. In 2017 and 2018, The Predator was a Columbia Scholastic Press Association Crown Finalist.

== Notable alumni ==
- Diedrich Bader — Actor, The Drew Carey Show, Office Space. (attended Groveton High School, graduated from T. C. Williams High School)
- Laurence M. Ball - Chairman, Department of Economics at Johns Hopkins University; internationally recognized expert in macroeconomics, consultant to the Federal Reserve, International Monetary Fund and the World Bank(Groveton High School graduate, 1976)
- Gary Beach - 2 time Tony winning Broadway actor who starred in productions including "Beauty and the Beast", "1776", and "The Producers". (Groveton High School graduate, 1966)
- James D. Blankenbecler - American command sergeant major, the highest-ranking enlisted soldier to be killed by hostile fire in the Iraq War.
- Chris Blewitt, 2013 - American football player, Washington Football Team, formerly Pittsburgh Panthers football
- Donna Dixon — Actress who starred in the TV show Bosom Buddies and numerous movies including Spies Like Us, Twilight Zone: The Movie and Waynes World; Miss Virginia USA, 1976, and wife of actor Dan Aykroyd. (Groveton High School graduate, 1975)
- Emmanuel Agbeko Gamor - Founder of Urithi Labs
- Bryan J. Howard, 1991 - Bass guitarist for the band Cracker (2014–present) and the band Slackdaddy
- Tiombe Hurd, 1992 - Olympian who holds the American record in the triple jump
- Christian Johnson - Arena Football League player
- Micah Johnson — American football player in the Canadian Football League, formerly University of Kentucky. (Transferred to Fort Campbell High School in Fort Campbell, KY in 2004, graduated in 2006.)
- General James L. Jones USMC - Commandant of the Marine Corps 1999–2003; Supreme Allied Commander Europe 2003–06; National Security Advisor to President Obama 2009-10 (Groveton High School graduate, 1962)
- Weini Kelati Frezghi - middle- and long-distance runner
- Rear Admiral Matthew L. Klunder - U.S. Naval Academy Commandant of Midshipmen 2008–2010, Chief of Naval Research 2011–2014 (Groveton High School graduate, 1978)
- Gregory C. Knight — Adjutant General of Vermont beginning in March 2019 (Groveton High School graduate, 1980)
- Paul Krizek - Member of the Virginia House of Delegates.
- De'Mornay Pierson-El, 2014 — American football player, Oakland Raiders, formerly University of Nebraska, Canadian Football League, and Alliance of American Football
- Willie Pile, 1998 — Professional American football player (Kansas City Chiefs, Dallas Cowboys)
- Ken Pomeroy, 1991 — American sports statistician and creator of KenPom.com
- Bunmi Rotimi - American football defensive end for the Arlington Renegades, formerly at Old Dominion University and the Chicago Bears
- Scott Shenker - Professor of Computer Science at UC Berkeley, Vice President of the International Computer Science Institute in Berkeley, California. (Groveton High School graduate, 1974)
- Scott Surovell, 1989 - Member of the Senate of Virginia, currently serving as majority leader, and former member of Virginia House of Delegates.
- Ashley Wagner — Figure skater, 2012 and 2013 US National Champion, member of 2014 US Winter Olympics team
- Ian Werden - Drummer of the rock band Slackdaddy
- Chris Bey - American professional wrestler
