= Adabraka =

Town in Greater Accra Region, Ghana

- Town
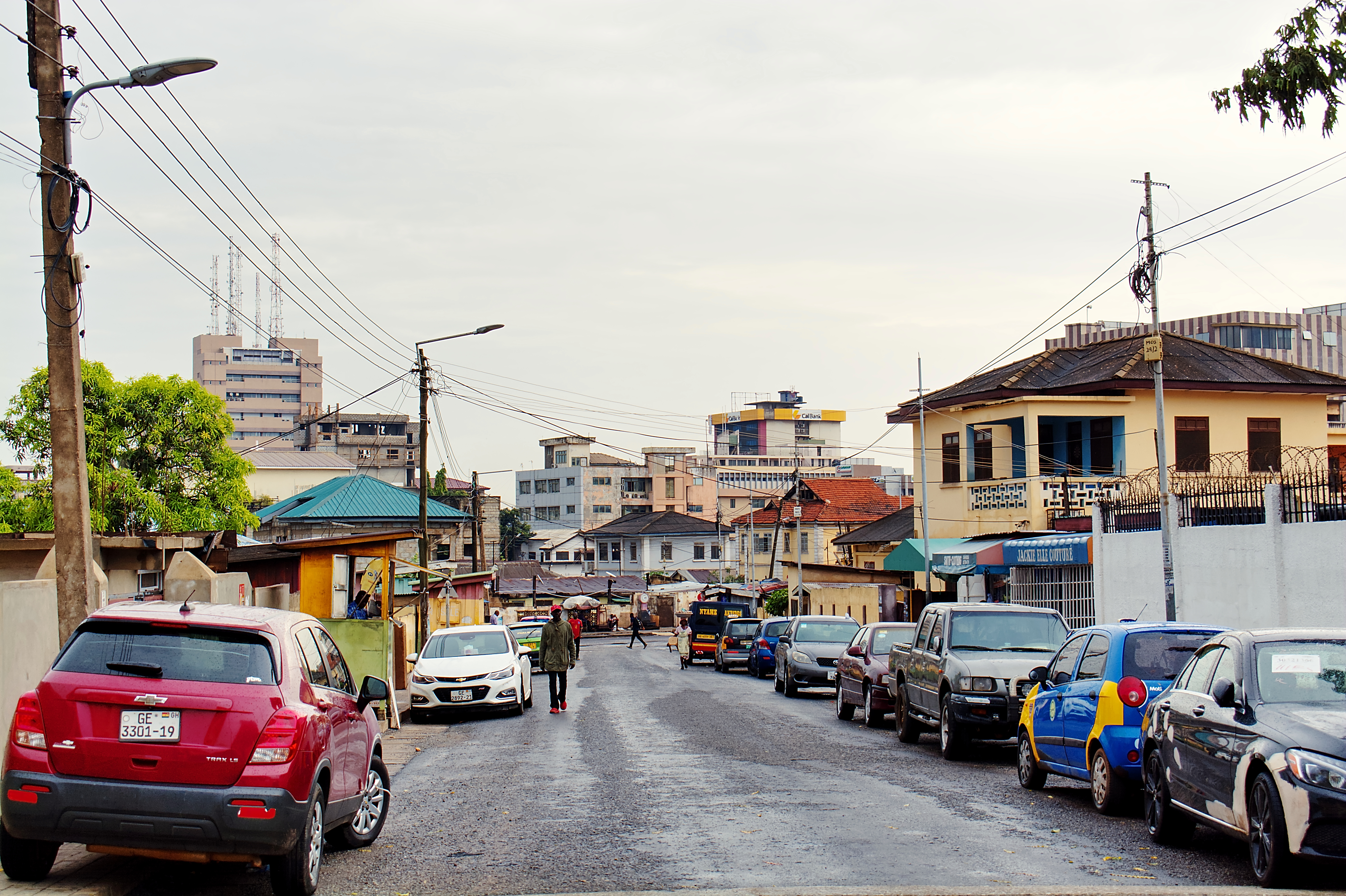
- View of a neighbourhood in Adabraka

- Location of Adabraka in Greater Accra Region, Ghana
- Coordinates: 5°33′47″N 00°12′42″W
- Country: Ghana
- Region: Greater Accra Region
- District: Korle-Klottey Municipal District

Government
  - Type: Mayor–council
  - Municipality mayor: Hon. Samuel James Nii Adjei Tawiah
- Time zone: GMT
  - Summer (DST): GMT
- Postalcode districts: List: GA050; GA074 - GA076; GA100 - GA103
- Area code: 030
- Climate: Aw

Adabraka is a town in the Korle-Klottey Municipal District, located in the Greater Accra Region of Ghana. It was the first affluent neighbourhood in Ghana during the British era. The town's economy is dominated by trade, which includes the Adabraka market. As of 2019, the current mayor of the municipality the town is located in is Hon. Samuel James Nii Adjei Tawiah.

== History ==
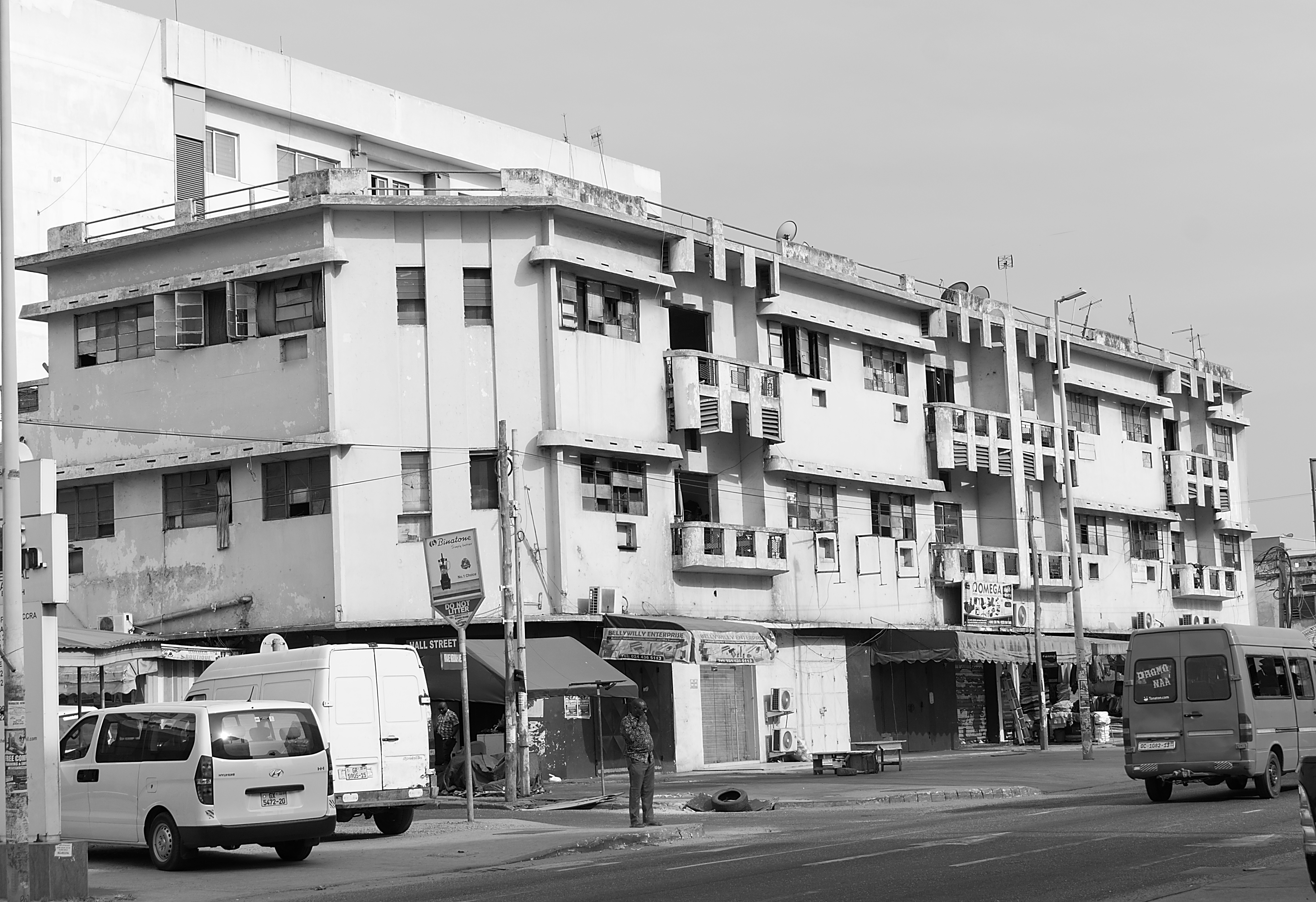
Apartment buildings in Adabraka

The town was first settled in the early 1900s developed by private owners. It steadily grew, fully developing the area between old Accra and central Adabraka by 1949 and the northern part of the town was finished by 1954. Since the 1940s, housing in the town is dominated by privately owned multihousehold buildings, consisting of four to forty rooms, most of which are rented to tenants.

On 2 November 2024, during the daytime, a group of five armed and masked men robbed a men seated in a red Toyota Corolla parked near the Adabraka market. Eyewitnesses reported seeing the robbers approached the vehicle with their guns drawn and began firing multiple shots into the air. The robbers stole a total of around ₵7,500,000 from the victim. One person suffered serious injuries during the ordeal. The Ghana Police Service launched a manhunt for the perpetrators shortly after the incident.

In August 2026, Adabraka Elders forward Emmanuel Abrokwa joined Sevilla FC's Under-19 side from the Accra-based club, marking a notable achievement for the local football community in Adabraka.

== Geography ==
Adabraka is one of many neighbourhoods surrounding the central business district of Accra. The town is within walking distance of government ministries, markets and private firms.

== Government ==
The town is administrated by the Korle-Klottey Municipal Assembly, which has mayor–council form of government. The mayor (executive chief) is appointed by the president of Ghana and approved by the town council. As of 2019, the current mayor of the municipality is Hon. Samuel James Nii Adjei Tawiah.

== Economy ==
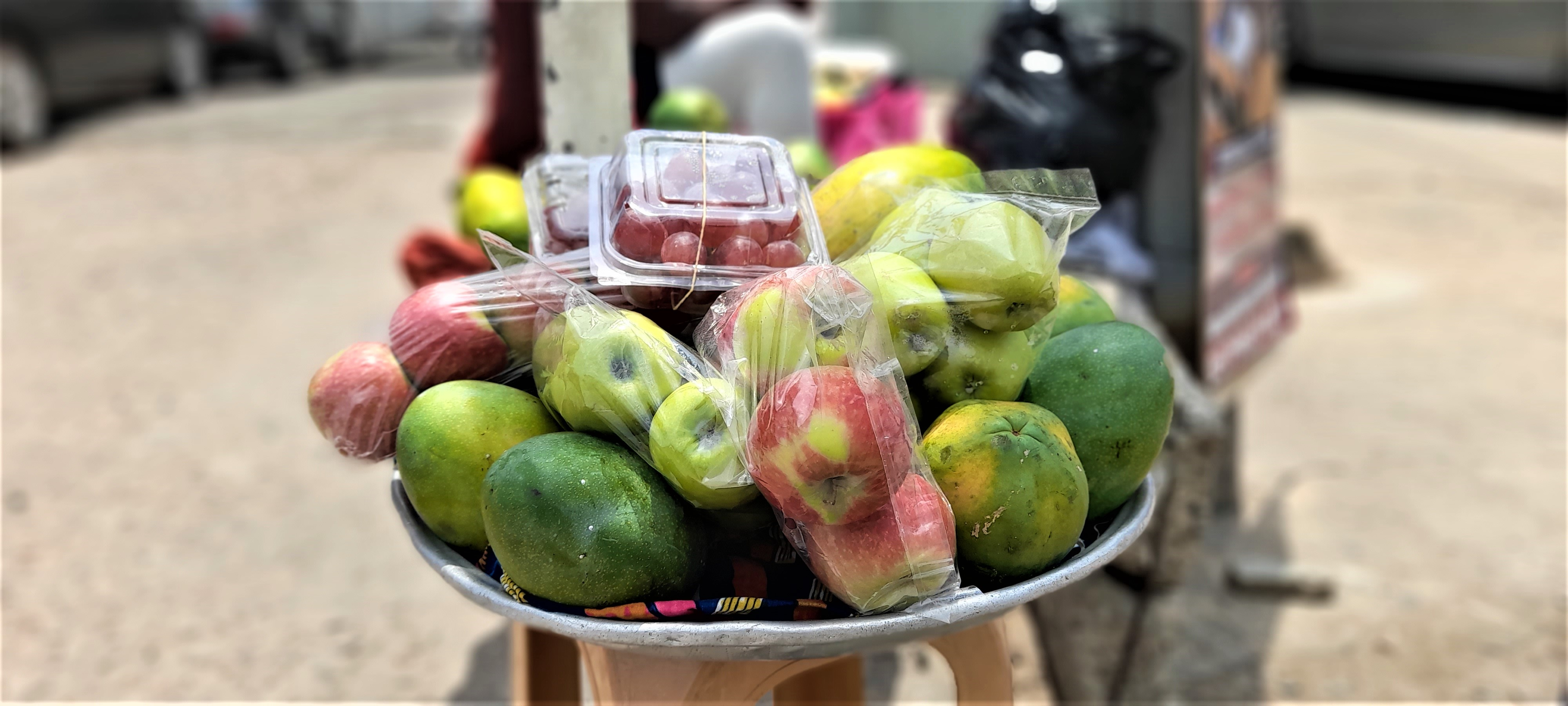
Trader selling goods in Adabraka

The town is home to the Adabraka market, which underwent renovations in 2013. The market was constructed in 1927 during the end of Sir Frederick Gordon Guggisberg's rule. It is known as a fish market because of the many types of dry fish sold. Traders at the market hired security to protect their goods overnight.

== Education ==
Adabraka is one of three circuits that are a part of the Education Directorate.

Adabraka was once known for the O'Reilly Senior High School. The school is a second cycle institution that relocated in 2010 to Okpoi Gonno at Teshie-Nungua.

The town hosts four tertiary institutions: the African University College of Communication (AUCC), The Ghana Institute of Languages (GIL), the Catholic Institute of Business and Technology (CIBT), and the Accra City Campus of the University of Ghana.

== Healthcare ==
The town is home to the Accra Rehabilitation Centre, established in 1962. The institution, since its opening, has helped trained more than 2,000 disabled people with employable skills. The town is home to six CHPS compounds (Note: CHPS hospitals are a national technique to help provide essential health services to communities who lack access to proper health care.).

Graphic Communications Group Limited hosts annual free health screening for residents of the town and its surrounding areas. This event, started in 2005, is a part of the community's celebration of the Homowo festival.

Adabraka is the location of the Accra Psychiatric Hospital, one of the oldest psychiatry hospitals in sub-Saharan Africa. The hospital is one of three of such institutions in the country. The hospital opened in 1906 and consists of a dispensary, a store, a gate keeper's room, and two large courts measured by 250 by 150 ft (76 by 46 m). The institution has a current capacity of around 800 patients. In 2022, it was announced by Dr Pinamang Apau, Medical Director of the Accra Psychiatric Hospital, that the Ministry of Health was working on redevelopment works on the hospital.

== Public services ==
Melcom have a branch in the town which is one of many in the region.

== See also ==
- List of cities in Ghana
