= African University College of Communications =

Private tertiary institution in Accra, Ghana

- Motto: Discover yourself from here
- Type: Private
- Established: 2002; 24 years ago
- Chairman: Joseph H Silver
- President: Professor Isaac Abeku Blankson
- Location: Adabraka, Accra, Greater Accra Region, Ghana; 5.558098°N 0.211731°W
- Campus: Urban area
- Colors: Black, orange, and white
- Website: www.aucc.edu.gh

The African University College of Communications is a private tertiary institution at Adabraka, Accra, Ghana, for the study and teaching of journalism, communication studies, information technology convergence, business, African Studies, providing opportunities for advanced learning, and practical and professional training for the rapid growth and development of Africa.

The university admitted the first batch of Diploma students for its Communication Studies programme in 2002, and was formally accredited as a tertiary institution by the National Accreditation Board (NAB) of Ghana in 2004.

== History ==
The African University College of Communications was formerly known as the Africa Institute of Journalism & Communications (AIJC). The institution was a private tertiary institution established in 2002 by Kojo Yankah, former editor of Ghana's widest circulation newspaper, the Daily Graphic, who also served nine years as Director of the Ghana Institute of Journalism, seven years as Minister of State, and eight years as Member of Parliament.

== Accreditation ==
In 2007, the institute received another approval from the National Accreditation Board to offer Bachelor of Arts degree courses and became known as the African University College of Communications (AUCC) becoming the first university in Africa to offer journalism and communication studies as its flagship. In 2010, AUCC was again granted accreditation by NAB to offer Bachelor of Science degree courses in Business Administration. The School is affiliated with the University of Ghana for the award of its degrees and with the National Board for Technicians Examinations (NABPTEX) for the award of its diplomas.

== Learning and research centres ==
The university has established several centres and institutions to offer opportunities for continuous learning to its students as well as interested members of the general public. These include:

- Kwabena Nketia Centre for African Studies,
- Ama Ata Aidoo Centre for Creative Writing
- The Centre for Innovation and Creativity
- The Business Centre.

== Library ==
The Sam Quaicoe Library is the main library of the African University College of Communications located on the ground floor of the AUCC campus main building. The library's collections include about five thousand books, CD's, tapes and impressive holdings of rare books, prints and archives. The library is also preparing to offer access to extensive electronic resources.

The Library is the nerve centre for academic work in the university. All academic related functions such as teaching, research and learning find their support-base in the library, where all types of documents are organised for easy access to members of the university community.

== Awards and memberships ==
The AUCC has been rated as a centre of excellence in media and communication studies by United Nations Educational, Scientific and Cultural Organization (UNESCO).

In March 2012, a joint radio programme by Level 300 students of the African University College of Communications (AUCC) and their counterparts in Simmons College in Boston, USA, won the "Most Innovative Programming in College Radio" award in New York, USA.

== Affiliations ==
The African University College of Communications currently has the following affiliations with these universities:

- University of Ghana, Legon Ghana
- University of Education, Winneba Ghana
- Ghana Institute of Management and Public Administration, Ghana.
- Clark Atlanta University, USA.
- Morehouse College, USA.
- The University of Maryland Eastern Shore, USA.
- Ohio University, USA.
- Howard University, USA.
- College of Bahamas, North America.

In addition, the AUCC is affiliated to institutions such as the UNESCO, World Bank, Mo Ibrahim Foundation, the Africa2Green International and the Voice of America (VOA).

The Business School of AUCC collaborated with a consultancy firm named Knowledge Innovations to equip professionals with knowledge in FinTech by the use of online training.

== See also ==
- List of universities in Ghana
