= Greenfield College =

Private university in Ghana

- Former names: College of Science, Arts and Education
- Type: Private
- Established: 2016; 10 years ago
- Affiliations: Kwame Nkrumah University of Science and Technology
- Vice-president: Dr. Christopher Basongti Beyere
- Dean: Dr. Kofi Oti Adinkra
- Location: Sunyani, Bono Region, Ghana
- Website: http://www.gfc.edu.gh/

The Greenfield College is a private university in Ghana. It is located at Penkwase - Sunyani in the Bono Region of Ghana. The college was established in 2016 and it was accredited by the National Accreditation Board in January 2017. It is also affiliated to the Kwame Nkrumah University of Science and Technology.

== Faculty of Law ==
The National Accreditation Board (NAB) granted accreditation to the college to set up the Faculty of Law to run Bachelor of Laws (LL.B) degree Programmes in 2017. Subsequently, the first batch of students totalling thirty-five students (35) were admitted in the 2017/2018 Academic Year.

== Professional Programmes ==
The Faculty of Law offers the following programmes:

- 1. Four (4) year LL.B for Non-Degree Holders (Full Time)(Day) for which the entry requirement is grade C6 or better in three (3) core subjects and three (3) elective subjects. A pass in selection test and an interview.
- 2. Three (3) year Post Degree LL. B (Full Time) (Weekend) for which the entry requirement is a good first degree from a recognized University and a pass in a selection test and an interview
