= Bunso, Ghana =

Bunso
- Rural area
- Location in Ghana
- Coordinates: 6°17′30″N 0°28′05″W
- Country: Ghana
- Region: Eastern Region
- District: East Akim District
- Time zone: GMT
  - Summer (DST): GMT

Bunso is a town in the East Akim Municipal District of the Eastern Region in Ghana. It is the site of the Bunso Arboretum and of Bunso Cocoa College.
