= Bunso Eco Park =

Park in Ghana

Coordinates: 06°16′06″N 00°27′39″W

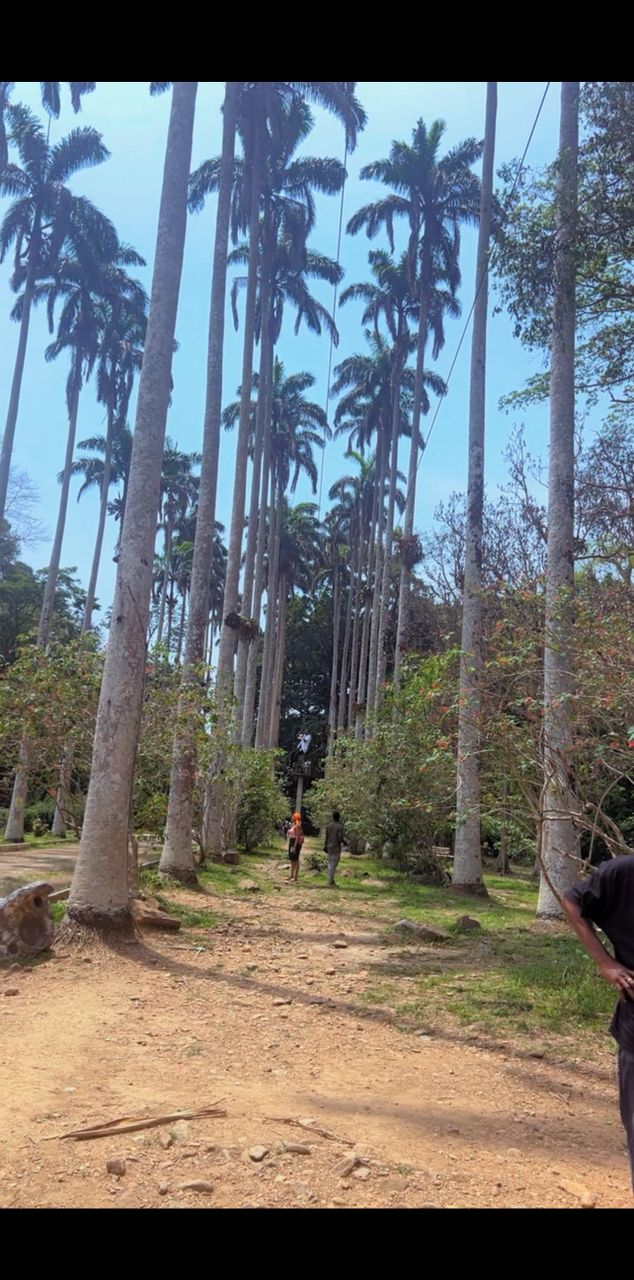
a view of the bunso eco park

Bonsu Eco Park, formerly Bunso Arboretum, is located in the Eastern Region of Ghana, south of the town of Bunso. It was founded in 1935 by two British men but later developed into a recreational park by Ghanaians in collaboration with the Ministry of Tourism Ghana. The site has over 600 species of trees used for used for various medicinal purposes. The Bunso Eco Park is a dense forest endowed with many medicinal plants, herbs and wild animals. The arboretum has within its enclave over 600 species of plants, 105 species of birds, 57 species of snakes, 300 species of butterflies, assorted fruits including; grapes, passion and the star fruit.

== Location ==
The arboretum is situated 3 kilometres (1.9 mi) off the Bunso junction on the Accra–Kumasi highway.

== Facilities ==
The arboretum contains different species of flowers and trees. It has a butterfly sanctuary and a canopy walkway, the second to be built in Ghana.

== History ==
The arboretum was officially opened in 1935 by two British nationals, Frank Thompson and David Gillet. After some time, the arboretum was handed over to the Centre for Scientific and Industrial Research (CSIR) as a research facility until 2019, when government of Ghana together with other private companies and the Akyem Abuakwa Traditional Council partnered to open the Arboretum up as a tourist facility.

== See also ==
- Aburi Botanical Gardens
