= Ghana Institute of Languages =

Public higher-education institution in Ghana

- Motto: Breaking barriers through languages
- Established: 1961; 65 years ago
- Location: Accra, Ghana; 5.658304°N 0.170495°W
- Website: Official website

The Ghana Institute of Languages is located in Accra, the capital of Ghana, and teaches English, French, German, Arabic, Spanish, Portuguese and Russian languages. It was established in 1961 by the first President of Ghana, Dr. Kwame Nkrumah. Initially, it was directly under the control of the office of the President at the Castle. It was formed to enhance the linguistic competence in modern languages of Foreign Service personnel and civil servants. Currently, The Institute is under the Ministry of Education with the National Council for Tertiary Education (NCTE) having oversight responsibility. The head office of the Ghana Institute of Languages is currently located in the centre of the metropolis of Accra. It lies off Barnes Road in the education loop and houses the School of Languages and the administrative staff. The School of Translators and the School of Bilingual Secretaryship are located in the new branch offices in Accra at East Legon.

In Kumasi, the Institute is located at Asokwa opposite the Kumasi polytechnic. The Tamale campus is in the Education Ridge, opposite the Tamale Stadium.

== Schools ==
- The School of Languages (SOL)
- The School of Bilingual Secretaryship (SOBS)
- The School of Translators (SOT)
- The Translation Bureau (Transbureau)
- The Research Department

== Mission ==
Its mission is to build bridges across language and cultural barriers for African unity and universal solidarity.

== Vision ==
The vision of the Ghana institute of languages is to become a pre-eminent international centre of learning to produce first class professionals in modern languages who will foster African unity, promote socio-economic and political integration in Africa and facilitate global communication.

== Objectives ==
The main objectives of Ghana Institute of Languages are to:

- Teach modern languages such as Arabic, English, French, German, Russian, Portuguese and Spanish.
- Train bilingual secretaries (English and French) to provide the necessary manpower resources in modern business communication and modern office management.
- Train professional translators.
- Furnish advice to government and public authorities in Ghana at their request in respect of matters relating to the teaching of the said languages.
- Provide translation services to potential clients.
- Do all other things that are incidental to or connected with the discharge of any or all of the said functions.
- Provide efficient language services such as translation, interpretation, bilingual secretarial services and tour guiding.

== Governance ==
The Ghana Institute of Languages Board of Management is drawn from a number of Institutions including the following: representatives from the Ministry of Education, the University of Ghana, the Ghana Institute of Management and Public Administration (GIMPA), the Ministry of Foreign Affairs, the Ghana National Association of Teachers (GNAT) and Ghana National Chamber of Commerce and Industry (GNCCI). The Director and Assistant Director of the Institute are ex-officio members of the Board.

Name of Representative	Name of Institution
Dr. Mawuli Adjei	Ministry Of Education
Ms. Theodora Entsua-Mensah	Ministry Of Education
Mr. Michael Francis Doh	Ministry Of Education
Dr Nasser Adam	University Of Ghana
Mrs Akua Aboagye Gyan	Ministry Of Foreign Affairs & Regional Integration
Prof. Yaw Agyeman Badu	GIMPA
Mr. Prosper Adabla	Ghana National Chamber Of Commerce & Industry
Mr. Fred Amanpene	Ghana National Chamber Of Commerce & Industry
Ms. Joyce O. Agyekum	Ghana National Association Of Teachers
Dr. John Rex A. Gadzekpo	Ghana Institute Of Languages

== See also ==
- List of universities in Ghana
