= National Lottery Authority =

Statutory agency in Ghana

National Lottery Authority of Ghana
- Logo used
- Region: Ghana
- First draw: 1958
- Operator: NLA
- Regulated by: Board of National Lottery Authority of Ghana
- Number of games: Six
- Shown on: JoyNews
- Website: www.nla.com.gh/about.php

National Lottery Authority (NLA) is a statutory agency in Ghana, which operates under the Ministry of Finance. As a governmental organization, the NLA is responsible for organizing raffles for the nation and provide an opportunity to win prizes, thereby making life more enjoyable and better for everyone, regardless of their financial circumstances. The board of the NLA oversees the activities of the organization. It is headed by the Chairperson, one Representative of the Ministry of Interior, one representative of the Ministry of Finance, another representative of the Attorney General's Department, two Government appointees, and the Director General.

The NLA offers a corporate platform where diverse skills and experiences converge, promoting creativity, innovation, effective management practices, and resulting in high efficiency and productivity.

== History ==
The Kwame Nkrumah administration established the Department of National Lotteries and placed it under the Lotteries Act (1958) when they created the national body to oversee lottery affairs. Subsequently, the department became part of the Lotteries and Betting Act of 1960.

Over five decades, the NLA transformed from the Department of National Lotteries (DNL) in the Civil Service to an independent Public Service Institution. It currently holds a legal lottery monopoly in Ghana, vital for revenue and jobs. Its present structure was formalized through the enactment of the National Lotto Act 722 in 2006.

== Affiliations ==
The NLA is a member of the International Association of State Lotteries and the African Association of State Lotteries.

== Operations ==
The Authority is headquartered in Accra.

=== Regional and District Offices ===
- Accra
- Kumasi
- Cape Coast
- Takoradi
- Tema
- Koforidua
- Sunyani
- Temale
- Oda
- Ho
- Abeka
- Sefwi
- Hohoe
- Wa
- Bolgatanga

== Controversies ==
In April 2026, the President of Ghana following the directive of a commission of inquiry into a controversial deal between the National Lotteries Authority and KGL Technologies Ltd. directed the Attorney-General and the Minister of Finance to renegotiate a 15-year deal signed in 2024. As at June 2026, the renegotiation has not reached a conclusion despite several meetings and adjournments.

In 2019, Samuel Awuku, who was then the Director-General of the National Lotteries Authority signed a contract with KGL Technoologies Ltd. to operate the authority's 5/90 lottery via a USSD code for 3 years. At the end of the contract in 2022, it was renewed for 10 years. However, before the 10 years could elapse, the board and director-general in 2024 signed a new contract that granted KGL exclusive rights to operate the lottery from 2024 to 2039.
