= Ghana Baptist University College =

University in Ghana

- GBUC
- Motto: Excellence in Leadership and Stewardship
- Type: Private
- Established: November 2006; 19 years ago
- Affiliations: Ghana Baptist Convention
- Chancellor: Ernest Adu-Gyamfi
- President: Joseph Oteng-Adjei
- Dean: Wiafe Nti Akenten
- Students: about 1900
- Location: Kumasi, Amakom, Ashanti Region, Ghana; 6°41′29″N 1°36′27″W
- Campus: Amakom, Kumasi Abuakwa, Kumasi
- Colours: Azure, White, Sky blue and Maize
- Website: www.gbuc.edu.gh

The Ghana Baptist University College is a Baptist Christian university college located at Kumasi in Ghana. The university has been granted accreditation by the National Accreditation Board. It is affiliated with the Ghana Baptist Convention.

== History ==
The school was founded in 2006 by the Ghana Baptist Convention in Kumasi.

In 2022, it received 100 acres of land in Ejura for the construction of a branch campus.

== Campus ==
The university has two campuses.

- City Campus - Amakom
- Abuakwa campus - Abuakwa

== Affiliations ==
Ghana Baptist University College is affiliated to the University of Cape Coast, the Ghana Baptist Convention and the Association of Ghana Private Universities.
