= Wisconsin International University College =

Private university in Ghana

- Motto: Peace, Harmony, Freedom, Truth, Knowledge
- Type: Private
- Established: January 2000; 26 years ago
- Chairman: Justice Isaac Duose
- Chancellor: Paul Kofi Fynn
- Vice-Chancellor: Prof. Obeng Mireku
- Location: Agbogba Junction, Accra, Ghana; 5.6700961°N 0.1894283°W
- Campus: Suburban area
- Website: www.wiuc-ghana.edu.gh

Wisconsin International University College, Ghana is a private university in the Greater Accra Region of Ghana. It was established in January 2000 and is accredited by the National Accreditation Board as a university college and affiliated to the University of Ghana, University of Cape Coast, the Kwame Nkrumah University of Science and Technology and University for Development Studies. The university has the first ever state-of-the-art Digital Forensic Laboratory that serves as Ghana's leading cybersecurity forensic laboratory supporting criminal and civil investigations and forensics.

== History ==
In 1992, Wisconsin International University was established. The first campus was established in Tallinn, Estonia as Concordia International University Estonia. In 1997, Wisconsin International University Ukraine was founded in Kyiv.

=== Campuses ===
There are two campuses:

- Accra Campus at Agbogba, North Legon
- Kumasi Campus at Feyiase - Atonsu - Lake Road

=== Organization ===
There are Five schools and two faculties within the university.

=== Programs ===
- Undergraduate
- Postgraduate
- Certificate (Short Courses)

== Undergraduate program ==
=== Wisconsin Business School ===
Department of General Business Studies

- BA Business Studies, General Business

Department of Management Studies

- BA Business Studies, Human Resource Management
- BA Business Studies, Marketing

Department of Accounting, Finance and Banking

- BA Business Studies, Banking and Finance
- BA Business Studies, Accounting
- BSc. Accounting

=== School of Computing Technology ===
Department of Business Computing

- BA Computer Science and Management
- BSc. Management and Computer Studies

Department of Information Technology

- BSc. Information Technology
- Diploma - Information Technology

=== School of Nursing ===
Department of Nursing

- BSc Nursing
- BSc Midwifery
- BSc Public Health Nursing

=== School of Communication ===
- BA Communication Studies - Specializations in Journalism (Broadcast, Print and Online)
- BA Music

=== Faculty of Law ===
- Bachelor of Laws (LL.B)

=== Faculty of Humanities and Social Sciences ===
Department of Language, Arts and Communication Studies

Department of Social Sciences

- BA Development and Environmental Studies
- BSc. Economics

== Postgraduate program: School of Research and Graduate Studies ==
- MA Adult Education - Options in Rural and Community Development/Human Resource Development
- MBA - Options in Finance/ Project Management/ Human Resource Management/ Marketing/ Accounting/ Management Information Systems
- MSc in Environmental Sustainability and Management
- MSc Logistics and Supply Chain Management
- MSc International Relations

== Certificate/short courses ==
- Professional Diploma in Functional and Advanced Investigations
- Diploma in Information Technology
- Certificate in Paralegal Studies
- Executive Certificate in Security Management, Forensics and Investigative Management
- Advanced Executive Certificate in Security Management, Forensics and Investigative Management
- Certificate in Music
- Certificate in Sign Language
- Certified Ethical Hacking by EC Council
- Certified Penetration Testing Course
- Certificate in Occupational Health and Safety Management
- Certificate in Christian Formation Leadership.

== Library ==
The University has the following libraries:

- Main Campus Library
- Faculty of Law Library
- Nursing Library
- Kumasi Campus Library

== Affiliations ==
- Wisconsin International University Homepage
- University of Cape Coast, Cape Coast
- University of Ghana
- Kwame Nkrumah University of Science and Technology
- University for Development Studies

== Nationalities represented ==
Currently, the institution hosts students of over 30 nationalities and speaking 20 languages from across Africa, Asia and the U.S.

== See also ==
- List of universities in Ghana
