= Garden City University, Kenyase, Kumasi =

Private higher-education institution in Ghana

Coordinates: 6.7392°N 1.5652°W

Garden City University
- Motto: 'Creatio Innovatorum' Translation: "Developing the next generation of innovators"
- Type: Private
- Established: 2001; 25 years ago as College of Information Technology and Management Systems (CITMAS), 2004; 22 years ago as Garden City University College, and 2024; 2 years ago as Garden City University, Kenyase, Kumasi
- Affiliations: Kwame Nkrumah University of Science and Technology
- Chairman: Prof. Ellis Owusu-Dabo
- Chancellor: Mr. Albert Acquah
- Vice-Chancellor: Prof. Eric Kwasi Ofori
- Undergraduates: 6,000
- Postgraduates: 150
- Doctoral students: 0
- Location: Garden City University, P. O. Box 12755, Kumasi, Ghana, Kumasi, Ashanti Region, Ghana
- Campus: Urban
- Colours: Dark teal Light yellow
- Nickname: Innovators
- Website: gcuc.edu.gh

Garden City University (GCU) is a private university located in Kenyase, a suburb of Kumasi, in the Ashanti Region of Ghana. The University was established in 2001 as College of Information Technology and Management Systems (CITMAS) by Mr. Albert Acquah, an indigene of the Kenyase town. The institution was granted accreditation as a tertiary education provider in 2005 and renamed Garden City University College (GCUC). In July 2024, it was granted a Presidential Charter by the Ghana Tertiary Education Commission (GTEC), making it an autonomous university with the authority to award its own degrees.

== History ==
Garden City University was founded in 2001 as the College of Information Technology and Management Systems, initially operating as an ICT training center. In 2004, the name was changed to Garden City University College. The institution received its first institutional accreditation from the National Accreditation Board (now part of GTEC) in 2005.

The university began its degree programmes in October 2005 with an initial cohort of 27 students (in two batches). Over the years, the student population has grown to over 6,000 across various academic disciplines.

At a ceremony on 19 December 2024, GCUC was awarded a Presidential Charter by President Nana Addo Danquah Akuffo-Addo, which was formally presented in January 2025. The charter transitioned the university from a college to a fully-fledged degree-awarding university, now operating as Garden City University (GCU).

== Affiliations ==
Garden City University until receiving charter status was mentored by Kwame Nkrumah University of Science and Technology (KNUST) and has professional affiliations and collaborations with the following institutions and regulatory bodies:

- Nursing and Midwifery Council, Ghana
- Medical and Dental Council, Ghana
- Allied Health Professional Council, Ghana
- University of Calabar, Nigeria
- Ohio University

== See also ==
- List of universities in Ghana
