= University College of Agriculture and Environmental Studies =

Private higher-education institution in Ghana

University College of Management Studies
- Type: Private
- Established: 1963; 63 years ago
- Chancellor: Okyenhene Amoatia Ofori Panin II
- Location: Bunso, East Akim Municipal, Eastern Region, Ghana
- Campus: Suburban area
- Website: UCAES Website

The University College of Agriculture and Environmental Studies (UCAES) is a tertiary education initiative by the Akyem Abuakwa Traditional Council under the authority of the Okyenhene Amoatia Ofori Panin II (King of Akyem Abuakwa).

It is the first university in Africa dedicated to agriculture and environmental studies. The university was registered under Ghana's Companies Code, 1963 (Act 179) as a company limited by guarantee in October 2006.

The University College is located at Bunso, in the East Akyem Municipality of the Eastern Region. It is a secular tertiary co-educational institution incorporated under the Ghana Companies Code, 1963 (Act 179) on 19 October 2006, and is one of the private sector initiatives for tertiary education.

== Programmes ==
The college offers a four-year Bachelor of Science programme in:

- B.Sc. Sustainable Agriculture
- B.Sc. Sustainable Forestry
- B.Sc. Environmental Science and Management

== Governance and organisation ==
The Chancellor The Okyenhene (occupant of the Akyem Abuakwa Stool) serves as Chancellor, and the chairman of the council is appointed by the Court; all other principal officers are appointed by the council.

== See also ==
- List of universities in Ghana
