= University of Environment and Sustainable Development =

Public university in Ghana

University of Environment and Sustainable Development Ghana
- Founder: Prof. Eric Nyarko-Sampson(founding Vice-Chancellor of the University)
- Established: 2020; 6 years ago
- Address: PMB Somanya, Eastern Region, Ghana
- Location: Yilo Krobo Municipality, Eastern Region, Ghana
- Website: Official website

University of Environment and Sustainable Development (UESD-Ghana) is a newly established University at Trom-Somanya in the Yilo Krobo Municipality in the Eastern Region Ghana. The institution was established by the Government of Ghana (GoG) through the Ministry of Education so that there will be an equitable "access for all" in Ghana. The institution was a collaborative project between Ghana and the Italian Government.

== History ==
The Eastern University, one of President Mahama's promises during the 2012 electioneering, will have two campuses, with the main campus at Somanya and the other at Donkorkrom in the Afram Plains.

In April 2013, President Mahama inaugurated a 12-member committee to develop the roadmap for the establishment of the university, which will tackle the critical environmental and sustainable development challenges of the country. That was followed by the establishment of an implementation committee.

President John Dramani Mahama, in December 2016, cut the sod for the construction of the university. President Mahama said Parliament had approved a £45-million commercial agreement between the government and Contracta, a construction firm in Italy, for the development and construction of the university, adding that the beginning of construction would thus proceed unimpeded. which was false, the funding was rather secured by the President Nana Addo on 21 May 2018 between Milan and Somanya - Contracta Costruzioni Italia (CCIT), SACE (Group CDP) and Deutsche Bank have finalized a deal to support a €45.6 million contract for the construction of the University of Environment and Sustainable Development of Somanya in Ghana.

== Objectives ==
The university announces its broad objectives as:

- To specialise in the conduct of research knowledge dissemination in the sciences, agro-business and the built environment.

== Organization ==
The Minister of Education, Dr Matthew Opoku Prempeh constituted interim council members for the institution. They include Professor Jonathan N. Ayertey as the chairman with other members which are: Professor Eric Nyarko as the VC, Mrs Efua Easaba Agyire Tettey, Professor John Blay, Ing. Johannes Twumasi Mensah and Mrs Gina Odartefio. Professor Eric Nyarko is the interim Vice Chancellor, Mrs Mary A. Agyepong works currently as the Registrar and Mr Barfour Awuah Kwabi is in charge of the Finance office.

Currently, UESD offers degree programmes in environmental studies, climate change, urban development, Water Resources Development, Energy Sustainability, Energy Economics and Agriculture.

"The University is to have four undergraduate Schools – the School of Natural and Environmental Sciences, the School of Sustainable Development, the School of Agriculture and Agriculture Entrepreneurship and the School of the Built Environment".

== Relocation ==
“There is only one University of Environment and Sustainable Development here in the Eastern Region. It is the first public university in the Eastern Region. It has only one vice-chancellor; it has one administrative headquarters. The vice-chancellor's residence is going to be built here (in Somanya). The administrative headquarters is also being built here (in Somanya),” President Addo Akufo. His statement was to assure the inhabitants of the area around the newly established first public University in the Eastern Region of the country, Ghana. At the inauguration of UESD, President Akufo-Addo explained that the agreement between Ghana and the Italian Government for the establishment of the university did not allow him nor anyone else to relocate it to Bunso, as was being propagated by opponents of the government, at the inauguration ceremony.

UESD is expected to specialise in the conduct of research knowledge dissemination in the sciences, agro-business and the built environment.

== Dismissal ==
The university was forced to dismiss two of its senior staff members by Ghana Tertiary Education Commission over fake credentials. The two Senior officers dismissed are Emmanuel Opoku Ware and Issac Abbam.

== International ties ==
The institution is a collaborative project between Ghana and the Italian Government.
