= KAAF University =

Private higher-education institution in Ghana

- Other name: KAAF
- Former name: Kaaf University College
- Motto: Knowledge and Excellence
- Type: Private
- Established: September 2007
- Founder: Michael Aidoo
- Chancellor: Michael Aidoo
- Vice-Chancellor: Dr Achampong Francis
- Students: 9,000
- Location: Fetteh Kakraba, Central Region, Ghana; 5.51254723475004°N 0.49319434422797104°W
- Campus: 35 acres (14 ha); Urban
- Language: English
- Colors: Gold, Brown, Black & White
- Website: www.kaafuni.edu.gh

KAAF University is an Engineering, Business Administration, Law, Political Science, and Health and Allied Sciences university in Fetteh Kakraba, Gomoa East District, Ghana.

== Background ==
KAAF University is the first private university in Ghana accredited by the Ghana Tertiary Education Commission (GTEC) to run undergraduate and graduate programs. It was founded in 2006 by Michael Aidoo.

At its 20th meeting held on 13 September 2007, the Accreditation Committee of the Ghana Tertiary Education Commission (GTEC) decided to grant a three-year authorisation to KAAF University with effect from September 1, 2007, to commence and/or continue its preparation for accreditation of the institution. KAAF University was affiliated with the Kwame Nkrumah University of Science and Technology (KNUST), Ghana Institute of Management and Public Administration (GIMPA), University for Development Studies (UDS) and University of Health and Allied Sciences (UHAS). The main campus is located at Gomoa Fetteh Kakraba in the Central Region of Ghana.

There are also programmes leading to the award of Bachelor of Science (BSc) degrees in Business Administration (with options in Banking and Finance, Accounting, Human Resource Management, Insurance, Marketing and Entrepreneurship), Bachelor of Science (BSc) degrees in General Nursing, Midwifery, Public Health Nursing, Pharmacy and Physician Assistant. Bachelor of Laws (LLB) and Bachelor of Science (BSc) Political Science programs are also offered.

There has been and introduction of multiple Masters programs.

== Program ==
The programs offered by the college fall under four main faculties: Faculty of Engineering and Faculty of Business Administration, Faculty of Health and Allied Sciences and Faculty of Law and Political Science.

=== Faculty of Engineering ===
- Bsc. Construction Technology
- Bsc. Mechanical Engineering
- Bsc. Electrical Engineering / Electronics Engineering
- Bsc. Civil Engineering
- Bsc. Geomatic Engineering
- Bsc. Computer Science
- Bsc. Information Technology

=== Faculty of Business Administration ===
- Accounting
- Banking & Finance
- Human Resource Management
- Marketing

=== Faculty of Law and Political Science ===
Bachelor Of Laws (LL.B) Program:

- 4 - Year LL.B Program
- 3 - Year LL.B Program
- BSc. Political Science

=== Health and Allied Science ===
- Bsc. Nursing
- Bsc. Midwifery
- Bsc. Public Health Nursing
- Bsc. Physician Assistant Studies
- Bsc. Medical Laboratory Science
- Doctor of Pharmacy (PharmD)
- Doctor of Medical Laboratory Science

== See also ==
- Kwame Nkrumah University of Science and Technology
- Ghana Tertiary Education Commission
- Education in Ghana
