= ISpace Foundation =

Technology hub for entrepreneurs in Ghana

iSpace Foundation
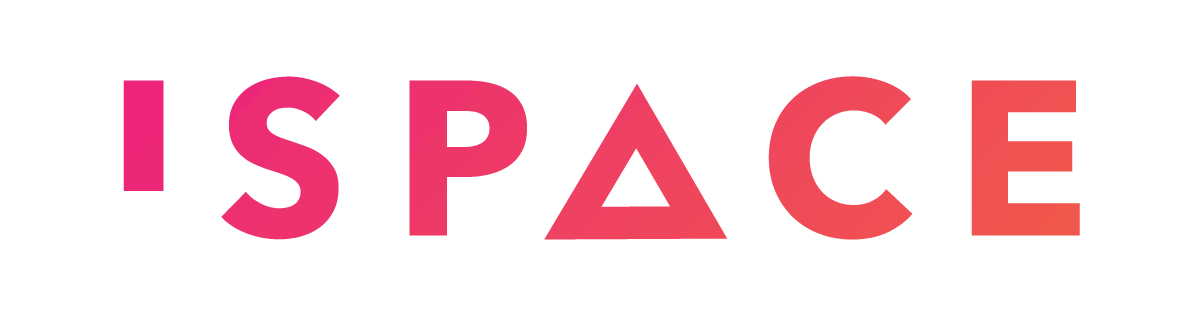
- iSpace Logo
- Founders: Josiah Kwesi Eyison and Fiifi Baidoo
- Type: NGO
- Legal status: Foundation
- Purpose: Incubating ideas
- Location: Labone
- Affiliations: Hivos (donor), IndigoTrust (donor)
- Website: www.ispacefoundation.com

iSpace Foundation is a technology hub in Ghana known to offer a co-working space, tools and facilities for entrepreneurs and startups to launch and manage their business ideas. It was founded in 2013 by two technology entrepreneurs Josiah Kwesi Eyison and Fiifi Baidoo.

== Activities ==
Though iSpace is known as a technology hub its activities have not been limited to technology.

=== REACH ===
REACH was a mentoring and networking program designed to connect Ghanaian startups with Google entrepreneurs.

=== Accra Negawatt Competition ===
The Accra Negawatt Competition was a competition by the World Bank in partnership with the space to generate technology software solutions to the power crisis which faced Ghana.

=== Code to Startup ===
The Code to Startup program was designed to give individuals programming skills needed to launch their technology startups.

=== Unlocking Women and Technology ===
The Unlocking Women and Technology program – an initiative of iSpace in partnership with Mobile Web was designed to get more females into technology by giving them computer programming skills and access to startup funds. Florence Tofa and Josiah Eyison are passionate about empowering women through the use of technology. To be rich in this current generation, one needs a lot of this new resource and that is what UWAT aims at doing by equipping women with the requisite skills to survive this technological era. Online forms were circulated on the internet, 104 women applied and all were taken through interview sessions from 1 to 2 September 2016 at Mobile Web Ghana. Selected applicants were taken through a twelve weeks course training in some programming languages, entrepreneurship and business training. The sessions began on 10 September 2016 from 9 am to 2 pm at Mobile Web Ghana and 10 October 2016 at Ispace Foundation. There were weekend schedules and weekday schedules to enable career women and students alike to have a flexible period. After the twelve weeks class an all Female Pitch competition was held on 26 November 2016 and 3 December 2016 respectively to select applicants for an accelerator programme where they will be given funding for their startup.

The accelerator programme ran for thirteen weeks.

=== 3D Printing Hackathon ===
Through the 3D Printing Hackathon, Eden Labs which is based in iSpace creates a platform for developers to train and also showcase their 3D designs and products.

=== Other events and involvement ===
- Social Impact Week
- Startup Dialogues
- Africa Code Week
