= Korle-Klottey Municipal Assembly =

Korle-Klottey Municipal District
- Municipal District
- Districts of Greater Accra Region

- Location of Korle-Klottey Municipal District within Greater Accra
- Coordinates: 5°33′14″N 0°10′30″W
- Country: Ghana
- Region: Greater Accra
- Capital: Osu

Population (2021)
  - Total: 68,633
- Time zone: UTC+0 (GMT)
- ISO 3166 code: GH-EP-__

Korle-Klottey Municipal District is one of the twenty-nine districts in the Greater Accra Region, Ghana. Originally, it was part of the then-larger Accra Metropolitan District in 1988, until a small portion of the district was split off to create the Korle-Klottey Municipal District on 19 February 2019; thus, the remaining part has been retained as Accra Metropolitan District. The municipality is located in the central part of the Greater Accra Region and has Osu as its capital town. In the first quarter of 2025, the current Municipal Chief Executive increased the IGF of the Assembly by 48.8%.
