= Impact Hub Accra =

Shared office space in Accra, Ghana

- Logo of Impact Hub Accra
- Established: 2013
- Type: Non-Profit Organisation
- Coordinates: 5.759066°N 0.220065°W
- Website: www.hubaccra.com

Impact Hub Accra is a co-working space located in Accra, Ghana. The hub recently joined the Impact Hub (Global Network) through the Africa Seed Program. Impact Hub Accra main mission is to support inclusive growth in Ghana through the creation of a social innovation ecosystem by developing programs, providing workspace, access to capital and connecting entrepreneurs focused on solutions to regional challenges. Impact Hub Accra is seeking to build a globally integrated entrepreneurial community that promotes high impact developments in West Africa.

== Memberships ==
Impact Hub Accra is a member of the Impact Hub (Global Network) which has 86 open Impact Hubs with 15,000 and more members across 5 Regions.

== Partnerships ==
- US Governments Broadcasting Board of Governors - Digital Innovation Lab.
- Danish Government (CKU) - §Creative Economy Incubator.
- Facebook & Internet.org, H4BC, WordPress - Hack For Big Choices Africa.
- US Embassy Ghana - Entrepreneurship Speaker Series.
- Unreasonable Institute(now called Uncharted) - Unreasonable Labs Ghana.
- Semester at Sea - Design Thinking and Local Innovation Workshops.
- Steele Family (Patrick Steele) - Seed Funding to Secure Hub space.

== Accomplishments ==
The hub is known to hold and support programmes that develop Ghanaian youth. It is best known for some popular entrepreneurial events in the city of Accra such as hackathons, pitch contests, training and workshops for startups. It currently hosts Ghana's first digital innovation lab.

Impact Hub Accra hosted Global Shapers Accra Hub's Shaping Davos event ahead of the 2016 World Economic Forum. Impact Hub Accra recently hosted the first Health Innovation challenge in Ghana termed "Health Hack Accra" that was open to entrepreneurs to create solutions to four health challenges that was identified for the hackathon sponsored by Merck Group. Impact Hub Accra was the venue for Seedstars Accra organised by Seedstars World that seek to find the next big entrepreneur or startup out of Africa and the World at large.
