= Impact Hub (global network) =

- Formation: 2005
- Purpose: To create a just and sustainable world where business and profit work in support of people and planet.
- Headquarters: Vienna, Austria
- Region served: Global
- Website: https://www.impacthub.net/

Impact Hub is a global network of locally founded/-operated impact innovation incubators, accelerators, coworking spaces, and nonprofit organizations that collectively own and govern Impact Hub Company, based in Austria. Each local Impact Hub must comply with the protocols and policies voted on and approved by the members of the network, in a distributed global operating model.

== See also ==
- Coworking
