= NII =

Nii or NII may refer to:

== Initialisms ==
- Negara Islam Indonesia, a defunct Islamist movement in Indonesia
- National Information Infrastructure, a telecommunications policy buzzword, coined under the Clinton Administration in the United States
- National Institute of Immunology (disambiguation)
- National Institute of Informatics, a Japanese research institute for the advancement of studies in informatics
- National Insurance Institute of Israel (Bituah Leumi)
- Nautschno-issledovatelskiy institut ("science and research institute"), part of the Russian-language name of a large number of Soviet and post-Soviet research institutions
- Net Interest Income, a financial term
- Non-Intrusive Inspection of cargo containers
- Nuclear Installations Inspectorate, part of the UK Office for Nuclear Regulation

== Places ==
- Nii Station (Hyōgo), a train station in Asago, Hyōgo Prefecture, Japan
- Nii Station (Mie), a railway station in Iga, Mie Prefecture, Japan

== People ==
- Nii Addy, American neuroscientist
- Nii Addo Quaynor (born 1982), a Ghanaian rapper better known as Tinny
- Nii Akuetteh, a Ghanaian policy analyst and activist
- Nii Allotey Odunton, a Ghanaian politician
- Nii Amaa Ollennu (1906–1986), a Ghanaian politician
- Nii Amugi II (1940–2004), former king of Ghana
- Nii Armah Ashitey, a Ghanaian lawyer and politician
- Nii Kwaku Sowah, a Ghanaian politician
- Nii Lamptey (born 1974), a former Ghanaian professional footballer
- Nii Nortey Ashong (born 1994), a Ghanaian professional footballer
- Nii Okaidja Adamafio, a former Ghanaian politician
- Nii Okaija Adamafio, a Ghanaian politician
- Nii Okwei Kinka Dowuona VI, (born 1963), King of the Ga people of Osu in Ghana
- Nii Parkes (born 1974), a Ghanaian writer
- Nii Plange (born 1989), a Burkinabé professional footballer
- Nii Quaynor, a Ghanaian engineer
- Nii Tackie Tawiah III, (1940–2012), former king of Ghana
- Nii Welbeck (born 1976), a retired Ghanaian professional footballer

== Other uses ==
- Nii language, spoken in the highlands of Papua New Guinea
- NII Holdings, a wireless telecommunications company with operations in Latin America, based in Reston, Virginia
- N-II (rocket), Japanese rocket based on the U.S. Thor/Delta family

== See also ==
- N2 (disambiguation)
