= N2 =

N2 or N-2 may refer to:

- Dinitrogen (N₂)

== Arts and media ==
- A model number of the Yamaha AvantGrand piano
- "N2", a 2011 song by Japanese indie rock band Asian Kung-Fu Generation, on the album Landmark
- Network 2 (now RTÉ Two), an Irish television station, which used the branding "N2" between 1997 and 2004
- NicoNico, a video sharing website

== Science and technology ==
=== Biology and medicine ===
- N200 (neuroscience), an event-related potential (ERP) component in the 200-300 ms poststimulus range
- A non-small cell lung carcinoma staging code for Metastasis to ipsilateral mediastinal or subcarinal lymph nodes
- A para formaldehyde-based filling material for root canals, also called Sargenti paste
- A strain of the Caenorhabditis elegans var. Bristol model worm

=== Transportation technology ===
- N_{2}, gauges that monitor the power turbine section in a jet engine
- N-2, an Armenian multiple rocket launcher system
- N-2 rocket, a 1981 Japanese derivative of the American Delta rocket
- A type of large goods vehicle
- GNR Class N2, a 1920 British 0-6-2T steam locomotive class
- USS N-2, a 1917 N-class coastal defense submarine of the United States Navy
- Huanghai N2, a Chinese pickup truck

=== Other uses in science and technology ===
- N2 diagram, in systems engineering, a function-to-function data interchange
- DSC-N2, a 2006 Sony Cyber-shot series digital camera
- N2, abbreviation for 2 nm-class semiconductor technology process nodes

== Transit ==
- Several roads; see List of N2 roads
- N2 (Long Island bus)
- London Buses route N2
- South East Airlines (IATA airline designator)
- Kabo Air (IATA airline designator)
- Carretera Nacional N-II, former name for the Route Nacional from Madrid to Barcelona and France
- Bambra (ship), formerly named the N2

== Other uses ==
- A United States Navy term for a senior military intelligence officer
- N2 Gateway, a housing project along the N2 freeway in Cape Town, South Africa
- N2, a postcode district in the N postcode area
- The fourth level in the Japanese Language Proficiency Test

== See also ==
- NO2 (disambiguation)
- NII (disambiguation)
- 2N (disambiguation)
