= Kwame Nkrumah University of Science and Technology =

Public university in Ghana

Kwame Nkrumah University of Science and Technology, Kumasi
- Arms of the Kwame Nkrumah University of Science and Technology
- Motto: Ashanti Twi: Nyansapɔ wɔsane no badwenma
- Motto in English: The knot of wisdom is untied only by the wise
- Type: Public
- Established: 1952; 74 years ago
- Affiliations: See below
- Chancellor: Otumfuo Osei Tutu II (Asantehene)
- Vice-Chancellor: Prof Christian Agyare
- Administrative staff: 4,178
- Students: 85,000+ (2023)
- Undergraduates: -
- Postgraduates: 2,306
- Location: Kumasi, Ashanti Region, Ghana; 06°40′43″N 01°34′16″W
- Campus: Suburban area
- Colours: Lust, black, forest green and yellow
- Website: www.knust.edu.gh

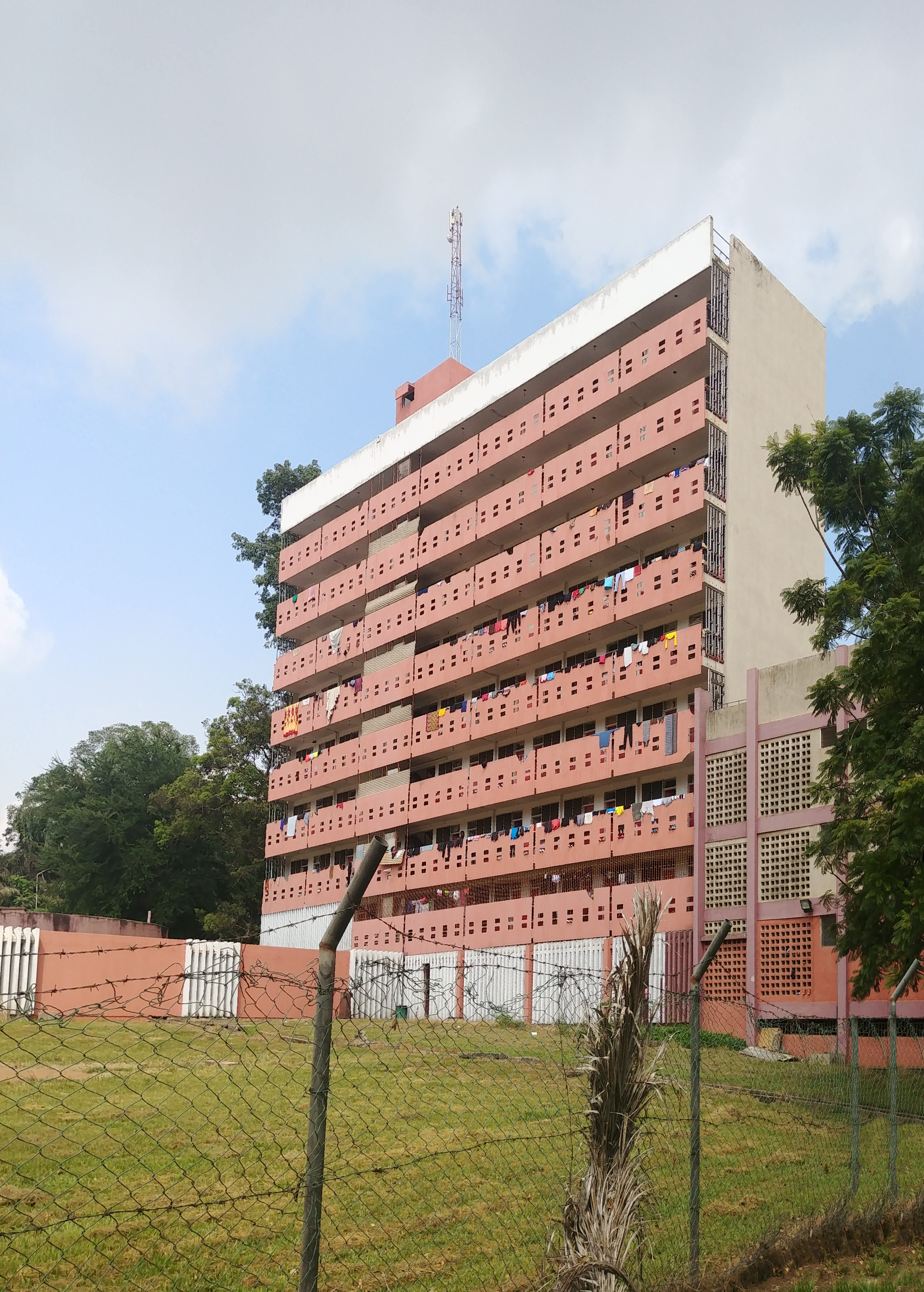
Independent hall of KNUST.

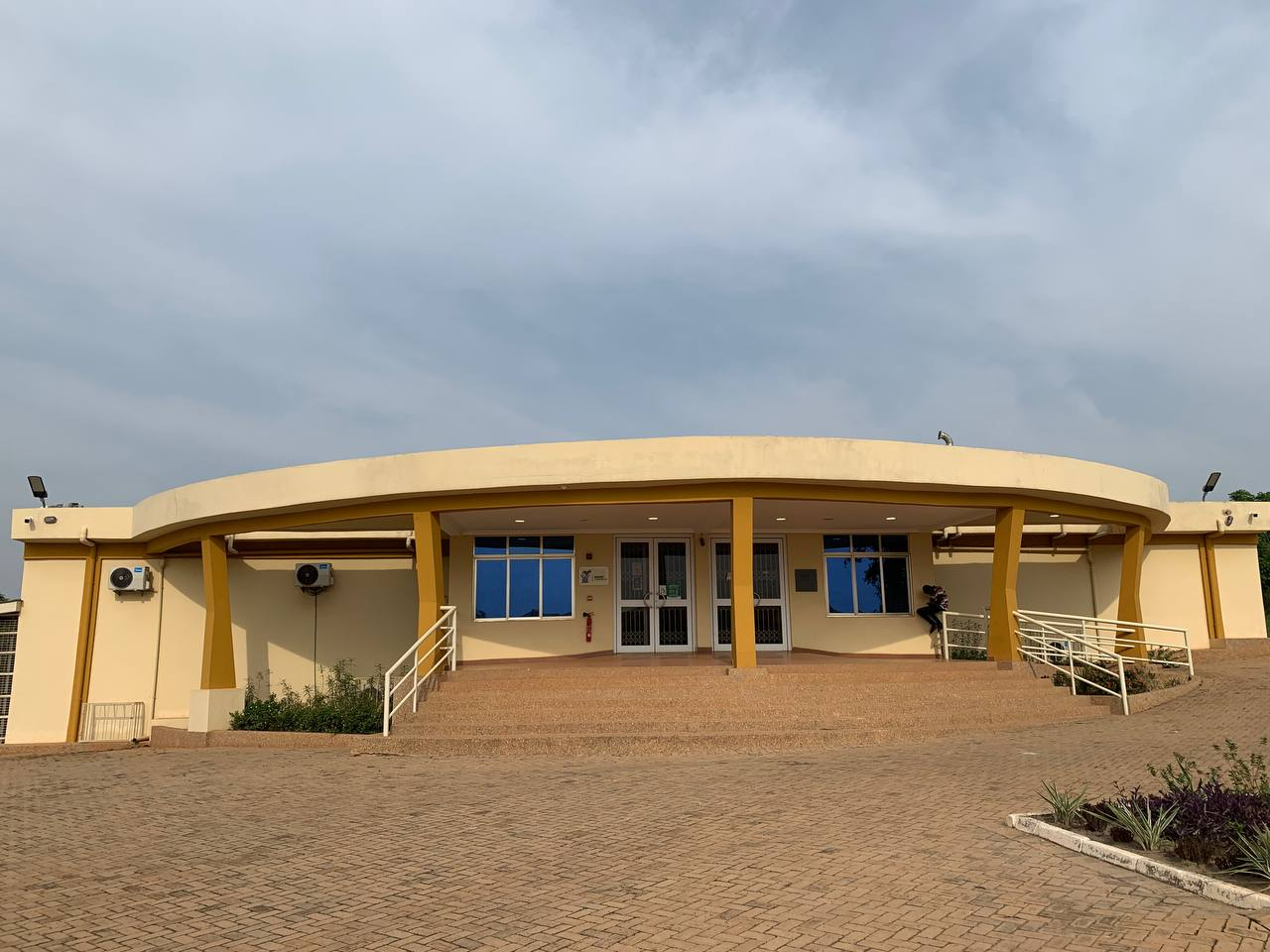
Central Lab of KNUST

Kwame Nkrumah University of Science and Technology (KNUST) is a public university located in Kumasi, Ashanti region, Ghana. The university focuses on science and technology. It is the second public university established in the country, as well as the largest university in the Ashanti Region of Ghana.

KNUST has its roots in the plans of Otumfuo Agyeman Prempeh I, a ruler of the Ashanti Kingdom, to establish a university in Kumasi as part of his drive towards modernization of his Ashanti kingdom. This plan never came to fruition due to the clash between British empire expansion and the desire of Otumfuo Agyeman Prempeh I to preserve his Ashanti kingdom's independence. However, his younger brother and successor, Otumfuo Osei Tutu Agyeman Prempeh II, upon ascending to the Golden Stool in the year 1935, continued with this vision. Events in the Gold Coast in the 1940s played into his hands. First, there was the establishment of the University College of the Gold Coast. Secondly, there were the 1948 Accra riots and the consequent Watson Commission report, which recommended that a university of sciences be established in Kumasi. Thus, in 1949, the dream of the Prempehs became a reality when building started on what was to be called the Kumasi College of Technology.

The Kumasi College of Technology offered admission to its first students to the engineering faculty in 1951 (however, those students started academic work in 1952), and an Act of Parliament gave the university its legal basis as the Kumasi College of Technology in 1952. The nucleus of the college was formed from 200 teacher training students transferred from Achimota College in the Greater Accra Region. The college was affiliated to the University of London. In 1961, the college was granted full university status.

The university covers a total land area of 2,512.96 acres (1,016.96 ha). The main campus which is about seven square miles in area, is about eight miles (13 km) to the east of Kumasi, the Ashanti Regional capital.

== History ==
=== Early history ===
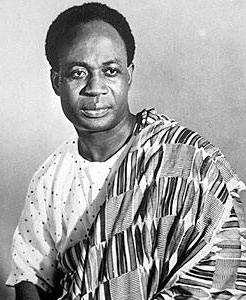
Osagyefo Dr. Kwame Nkrumah, the first President of the Republic of Ghana

The Kumasi College of Technology opened officially on 22 January 1952 with 200 teacher training students transferred from Achimota, to form the nucleus of the new college. In October 1952, the School of Engineering and the Department of Commerce were established and the first students were admitted. A Pharmacy Department was established in January 1953, with the transfer of the former School of Pharmacy from Korle Bu Teaching Hospital, Accra, to the college. The department ran a two-year comprehensive course in Pharmacy leading to the award of the Pharmacy Board Certificate. A Department of Agriculture was opened in the same year to provide ad hoc courses of varying duration, from a few terms to three years, for the Ministry of Agriculture. A Department of General Studies was instituted to prepare students for the Higher School Certificate Examinations in Science and Arts subjects and to give instruction in subjects as requested by the other departments.

From 1952 to 1955, the School of Engineering prepared students for professional qualifications only. In 1955, the school embarked on courses leading to the University of London Bachelor of Engineering External Degree Examinations.

In 1957, the School of Architecture, Town Planning and Building was inaugurated. Its first students were admitted in January 1958, for professional course.

As the college expanded, it was decided to make the Kumasi College of Technology a purely science and technology institution. In pursuit of this policy, the Teacher Training College, with the exception of the Art School, was transferred in January 1958, to the Winneba Training College; in 1959 the Commerce Department was transferred to Achimota to form the nucleus of the present School of Administration of the University of Ghana, Legon.

In December 1960, the Government of Ghana appointed a University Commission to advise it on the development of university education, in connection with the proposal to transform the University College of Ghana and the Kumasi College of Technology into an independent University of Ghana. Following the report of the commission which came out early 1961, the government decided to establish two independent universities in Kumasi and Legon, Accra. The Kumasi College of Technology was thus transformed, under the supervision of R. P. Baffour, into a full-fledged university, and named Kwame Nkrumah University of Science and Technology by an Act of Parliament on 22 August 1961. The name honours Kwame Nkrumah, the first prime minister and later president of Ghana.

The name was changed to University of Science and Technology after the coup of 24 February 1966. The University of Science and Technology was officially inaugurated on Wednesday, 20 November 1961. However, another act of Parliament (Act 559 of 1998) changed the name back to its original version, the Kwame Nkrumah University of Science and Technology, Kumasi.

== Campuses ==
=== Kumasi Campus ===
The Kumasi campus is the main campus of the university. It is about seven square miles in area and about eight miles (13 km) to the east of Kumasi. It houses the Central Administration and other important facilities.

=== Obuasi Campus ===
The Obuasi campus was officially commissioned on 4 November 2020 despite its inception in the year 2019. It runs 15 undergraduate programmes, which include seven Engineering programmes, four Business Administration programmes, three Allied Health Sciences programmes and one Science programme.

== Organization and administration ==
=== Principal officers ===
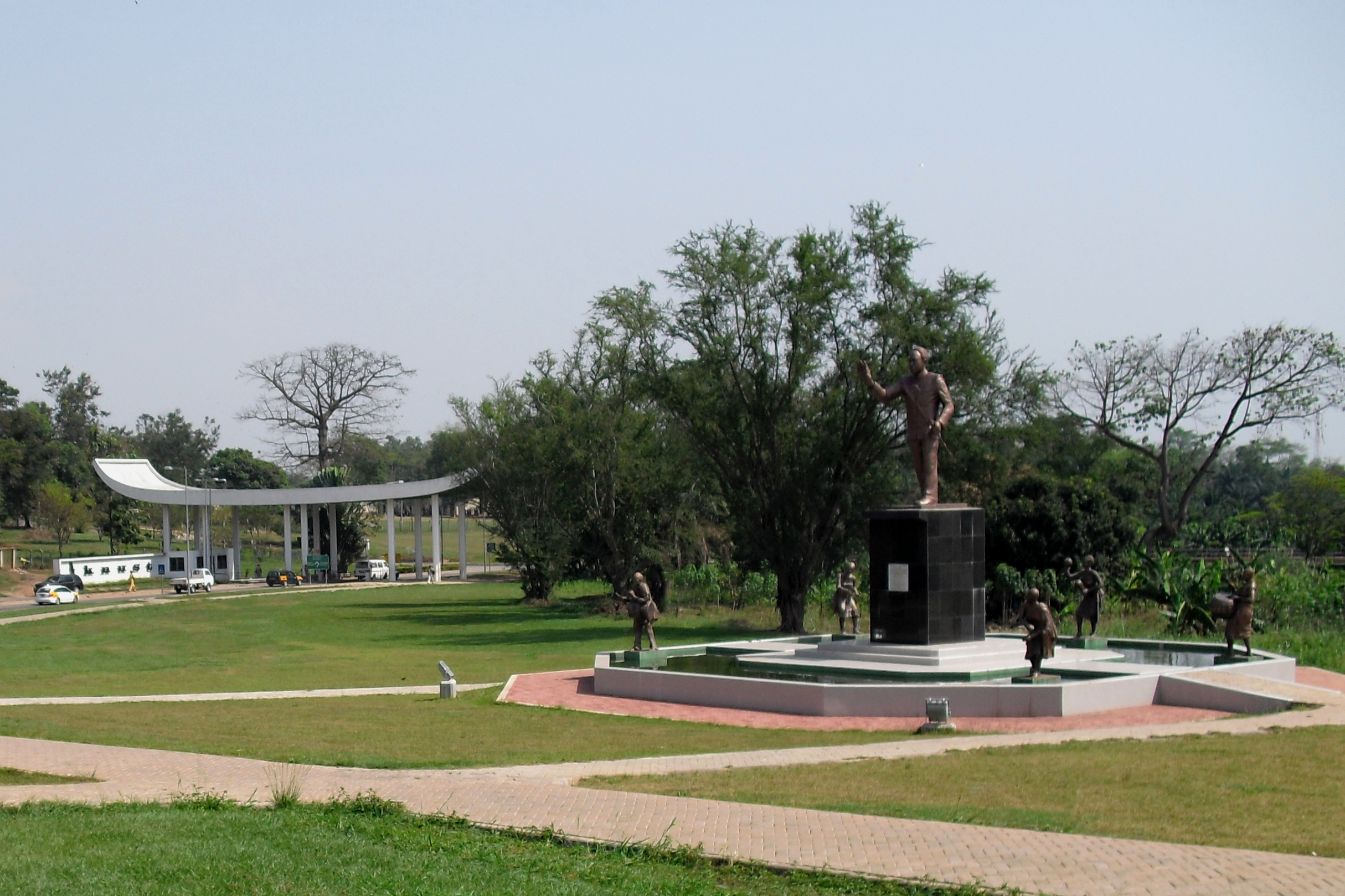
Main entrance of KNUST, Kumasi, and the Kwame Nkrumah Memorial Park with a statue of the first president of the Republic of Ghana and the founder of the university with five smaller figures in national attire playing drums

The principal officers of the university are the chancellor, chairman of the University Council and vice-chancellor. As of 2018, the position of chancellor was held by the Asantehene Otumfuo Osei Tutu II.

=== Governing body ===
Governance is carried out by the University Council, primarily through the Academic Board, which is responsible for:

- formulating and carrying out the academic policy of the university
- devising and regulating the courses of instruction and study, and supervising research
- regulating the conduct of examinations and the award of degrees, diplomas and certificates
- advising the University Council on the admission of students and the award of scholarships
- reporting on such matters as may be referred to it by the University Council

=== Student participation in university administration ===
Students through the KNUST Students' Representative Council (KNUST SRC) participate in the administration of the university through their representatives serving on the University Council, Academic Board, the Welfare Services Board, Faculty and Departmental Boards, Residence Committee, Library Committee and on the Hall Councils.

The council operates with a budget that is primarily dispensed to student organizations, but it also funds social events and student initiatives. As the sole representative student government, the KNUST SRC provides student services like most student unions and also performs advocacy on behalf of the student body.

=== Collegiate system ===
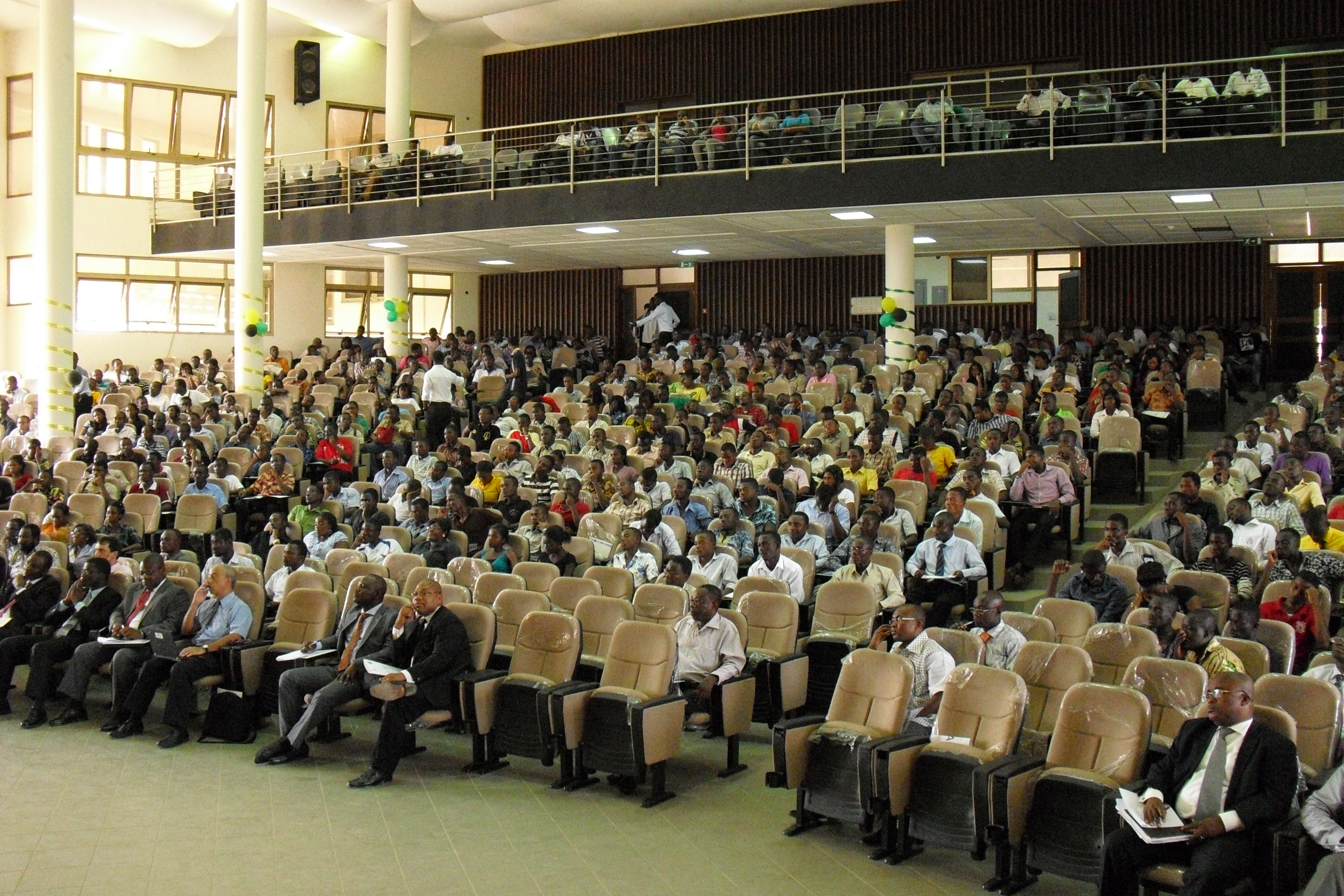
College of Engineering, KNUST auditorium

KNUST has, since January 2005, transformed from its previous centralized system of administration into a decentralized collegiate university. Under this system, the faculties have been condensed into six colleges.

The university had been administered on the faculty-based system. This led to administrative difficulties as new faculties and institutes were created to meet the ever-growing academic pursuits of students. To solve this problem, a collegiate system was officially adopted on 29 November 2004. On 5 April 2005, the pioneering provosts were inducted and invested into office at the Great Hall of the KNUST.

The colleges are semi-autonomous, which means that they are given the power to largely run on their own without much dependence on the central administration for financial support. A college registrar, finance officer and librarian assist the provosts. Under them are the faculties, centres and institutes, headed by deans and directors. As heads of the colleges, the provosts provide academic and administrative leadership for the colleges and oversee their overall running.

== Housing and accommodation ==
There are numerous KNUST approved hostels, mostly in close proximity to the main campus. Students of all financial backgrounds have their accommodation needs catered for. There are six halls of residence at the Kumasi campus, each administered by a hall council consisting of senior and junior members. There are a few hostels on campus like the GUSSS hostels, Brunei, and Tek credit hostel. The executive head is the hall master, who is assisted by a senior tutor. There is a hall bursar and other supporting staff.

=== Halls of residence ===
- University Hall (Katanga)
- Unity Hall (Conti)
- Independence Hall
- Queens Hall
- Republic Hall
- Africa Hall

=== Hostels ===
About 60% of the student population is non-resident. There are private hostels around the campus and in Kumasi for students who, as a result of the limited facilities/rooms, could not be admitted as resident students. Apart from these private-owned hostels, the university management have also made some efforts to solve this accommodation issue. In response to that, some hostels have also been built right on campus. These are:

- The Impact Building: This was funded by the Mastercard foundation and serves as a secretariat for Mastercard scholars on campus. Some of the rooms are occupied by these scholars whereas some of the rooms are used for temporary leasing on a daily basis earning income for its management.
- The GUSSS Hostels: These hostels are popularly referred to as Brunei on campus. They have five buildings in total. These are Old and New Brunei, Complex, Baby Brunei and Hall 7.
- The Otumfuo Osei Tutu II Hostel: Also referred to as SRC Hostel on campus. This was also built through the efforts of the school's SRC.

There are facilities on campus where non-resident students can rest between lectures and study before they leave for their homes and hostels.

In January 2014, the top floor of the Crystal Rose Hostel caught fire while most students were on vacation. The cause of the fire is still not known.

=== International students ===
There is a large multinational community at KNUST, largely due to the high standards of education. There is an international student association that looks after the interests of foreign students, including accommodation, orientation, and campus tours.

== Academics ==
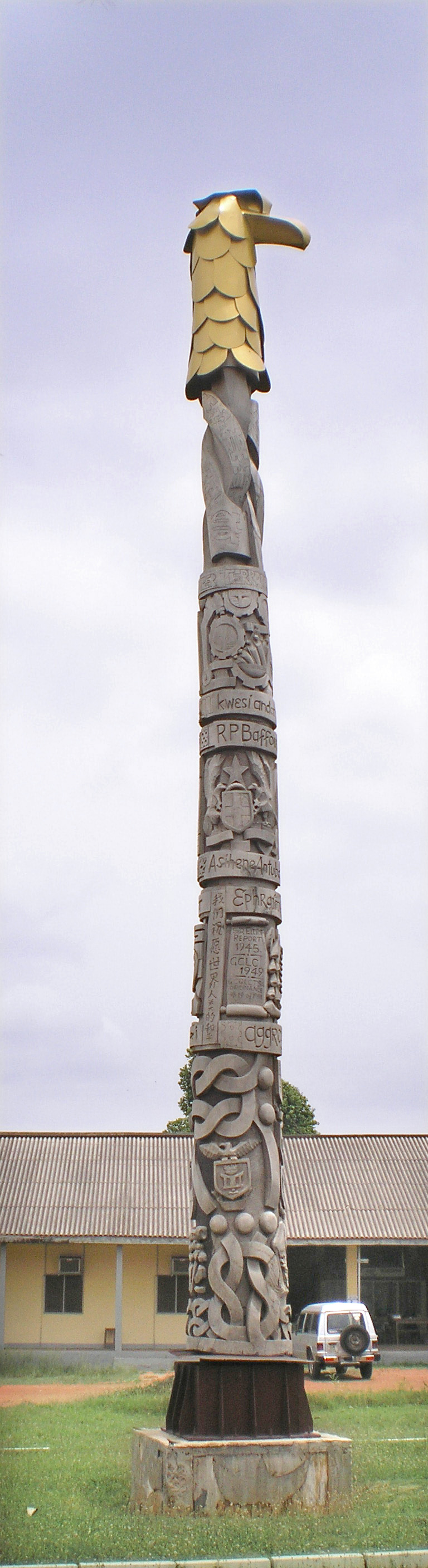
The Peace Pole was erected on the university campus on 21 September 2006, International Day of Peace. The pole is made of a 105-year-old sapele tree that used to stand in the university's botanical garden. The pole is 16.7 metres (55 feet) tall. Indigenous symbols have been carved in bas-relief on it in five languages (Twi—a local language in Ghana, Hindi, Chinese, Swahili, and Arabic). The peace prayer on the pole says: "May peace be upon Earth".

Since the 2010/11 academic year, some of the colleges operate a two-tier system, while others maintain their three-tier system.

=== College of Agriculture and Natural Resources CANR ===
- Faculty of Agriculture
  - Department of Agricultural Economics, Agribusiness and Extension
  - Department of Animal Sciences
  - Department of Crop and Soil Sciences
  - Department of Horticulture
- Faculty of Renewable Natural Resources
  - Department of Agroforestry
  - Department of Fisheries and Watershed Management
  - Department of Silviculture and Forest Management
  - Department of Wildlife and Range Management
  - Department of Wood Science and Technology
- Faculty of Forest Resources Technology
  - Department of Ecotourism and Forest Recreation
  - Department of Land Reclamation and Rehabilitation
  - Department of Social Forestry
  - Department of Wood Processing and Marketing

=== College of Health Sciences ===
- Faculty of Allied Health Sciences
  - Department of Medical Diagnostics
  - Department of Medical Imaging
  - Department of Physiotherapy and Sports Science
- Faculty of Pharmacy and Pharmaceutical Sciences
  - Department of Pharmaceutical Chemistry
  - Department of Pharmacology
  - Department of Pharmacognosy
  - Department of Pharmacy Practice
  - Department of Pharmaceutics
  - Department of Herbal Medicine
- School of Dentistry
- School of Medical Sciences
- School of Veterinary Medicine
- School of Nursing and Midwifery

=== College of Humanities and Social Sciences ===
- Faculty of Law
- Faculty of Social Sciences
  - Department of Economics
  - Department of English
  - Department of Geography and Rural Development
  - Department of History and Political Studies
  - Department of Modern Languages currently called the department of Language and Communication Sciences.
  - Department of Religious Studies
  - Department of Sociology and Social Work
- School of Business
  - Department of Supply Chain and Information Systems.
  - Department of Marketing and Corporate Strategy
  - Department of Human Resource and Organizational Development.
  - Department of Accounting and Finance

Colleges under the two-tier system (Provost/Head of Department):

=== College of Art and Built Environment ===
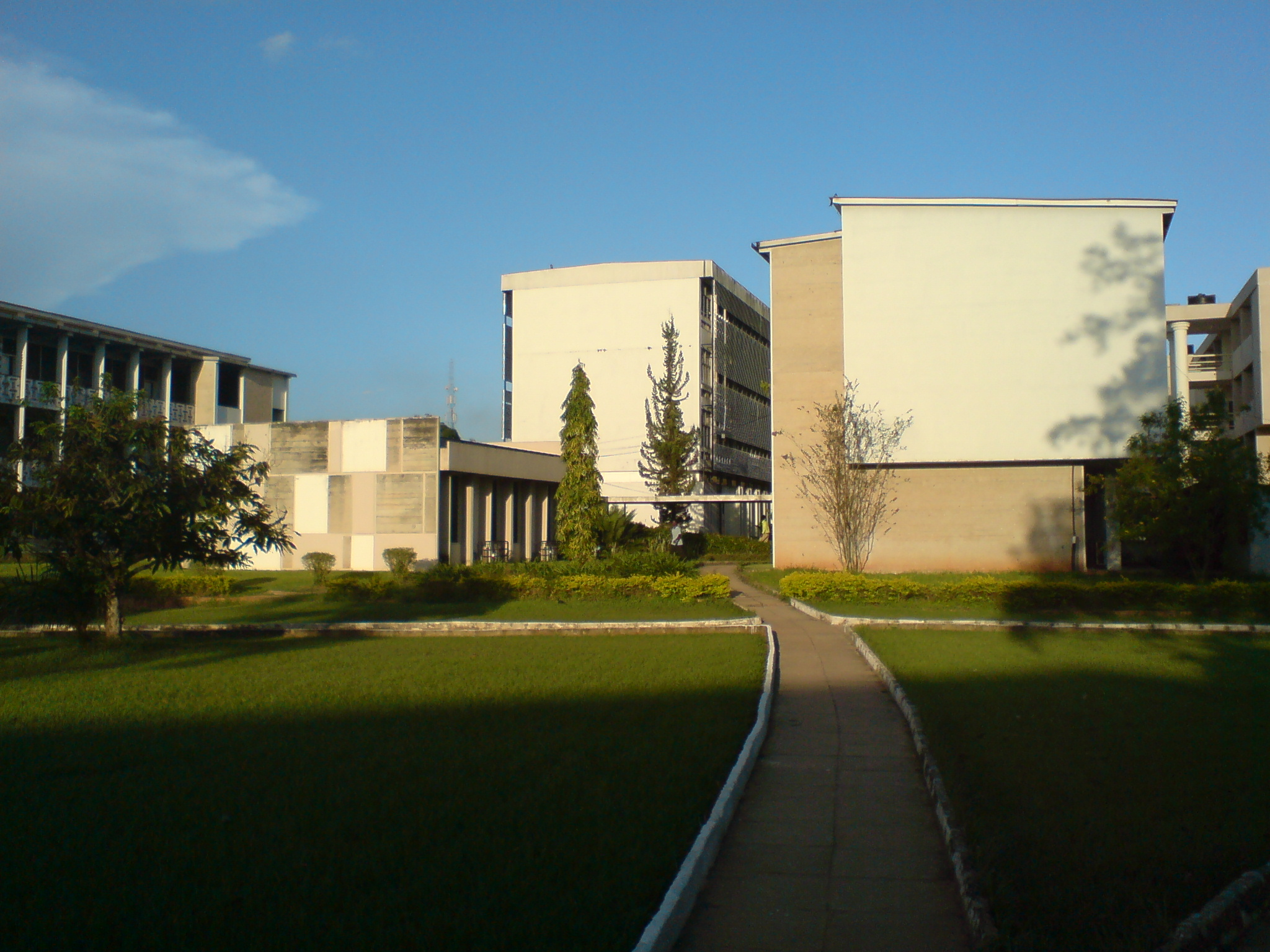
The College of Art and Built Environment

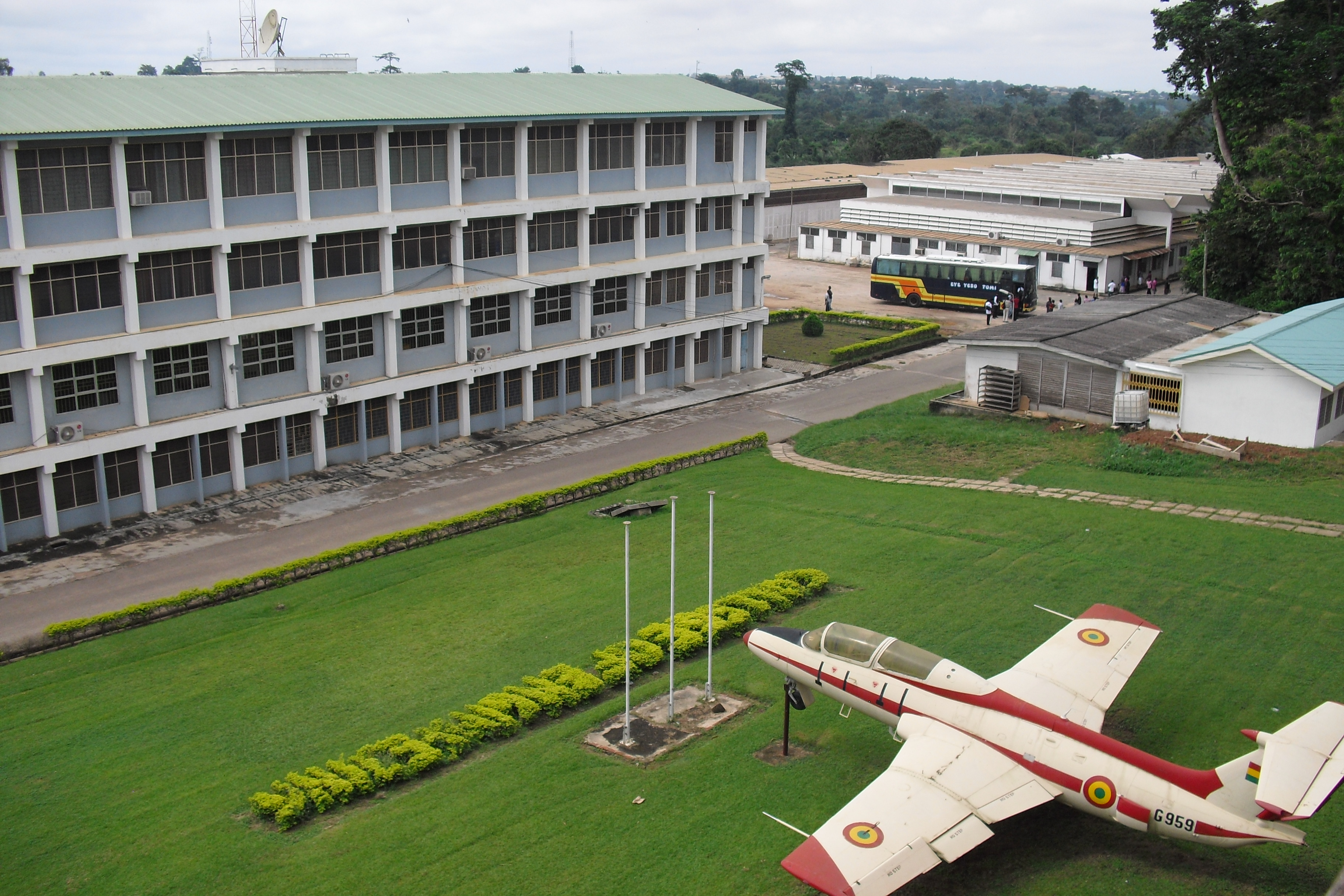
Lab/office block of the College of Engineering

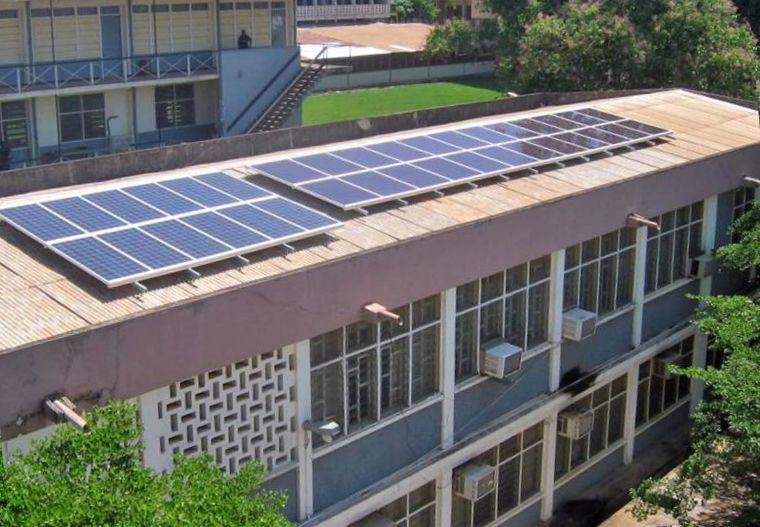
Solar panels on a roof in the College of Engineering

The College of Art and Built Environment formerly known as College of Architecture and Planning came into existence in January 2005 as part of the restructuring of the University into a Collegiate System. In the restructuring, the Faculty of Environmental and Development studies (FEDS) and the Institute of Land Management and Development (ILMAD) were merged to form the College. FEDS comprised three teaching departments: Department of Architecture, department of Building Technology and Department of Housing and Planning Research. ILMAD comprised two departments, Department of Land Economy and the Land Resources Centre. The college currently comprises two faculties, ten teaching departments and one research institute:
- Department of Communication Design
- Department of General Art Studies
- Department of Painting and Sculpture
- Department of Integrated Rural Art/Industry
- Department of Industrial Art
- Department of Educational Innovations in Science and Technology
- Department of Publishing Studies
- Department of Architecture
- Department of Building Technology
- Department of Land Economy
- Department of Planning
- Centre for Settlements Studies
- Centre for Land Studies

=== College of Engineering ===
- Department of Agricultural Engineering
- Department of Aerospace Engineering
- Department of Chemical Engineering
- Department of Civil Engineering
- Department of Computer Engineering
- Department of Electrical Engineering/Electronic Engineering & Telecommunication Engineering
- Department of Geological Engineering
- Department of Geodetic Engineering
- Department of Geomatic Engineering
- Department of Materials Engineering
- Department of Mechanical Engineering
- Department of Petroleum Engineering

=== College of Science ===
The following is the list of departments under the college of science, KNUST.
- Department of Biochemistry and Biotechnology
- Department of Chemistry
- Department of Computer Science
- Department of Environmental Science
- Department of Food Science and Technology
- Department of Mathematics
- Department of Optometry and Visual Science
- Department of Physics
- Department of Theoretical and Applied Biology
- Department of Statistics and Actuarial Sciences
- Department of Meteorology and Climate Science

=== Institute of Distance Learning ===
In the year 2005, KNUST adopted Distance Learning as a viable complement to the conventional face-to-face system of education. This decision was made to offer opportunity for people to pursue academic programmes with the Kwame Nkrumah University of Science and Technology, while still on full-time employment.

In October 2007, the Academic Board changed the status of the Faculty of Distance Learning to the Institute of Distance Learning.

=== Library and digital resources ===
The KNUST Library provides information in electronic and print formats to staff and students mainly to support teaching, learning and research in science and technology for national development. It is a depository library for all materials published in Ghana and for international institutions and organisations like the World Bank and other United Nations Agencies.

Digital services are available through the Open Educational Resource (OER) as well as the DSpace repository.

- The Open educational resources (OER) component of the Kwame Nkrumah University of Science and Technology fosters collaboration on curricula, course materials, and content; generates connections between disciplines, teachers, and learners; and inspires use of educational materials in a more effective way.
- KNUST Online Repository is the university's digital repository. Data for the repository is still being added.

=== Affiliated institutions ===
- Accra Institute of Technology
- Akim State University College
- All Nations University College
- Central University College
- Kaaf University College
- DataLink University College(DLUC)
- Garden City University College
- Ghana Telecom University College
- Ho Polytechnic
- Osei Tutu II Institute for Advanced ICT Studies
- Regent University College
- Spiritan Institute / Spiritan University College

In December 2019, an agreement was signed between the Gambian government and Kwame Nkrumah University of Science and Technology to set up Science, Technology and Engineering University in The Gambia. In the accord, the administrative and teaching faculties will be set up, coached by and affiliated to KNUST.

=== Research Centres ===
- Institute for Rural Development and Innovation Studies (IRDIS)
- Centre for Biodiversity Utilisation and Development (CBUD)
- Centre for Cultural and African Studies
- Centre for Human Studies
- Dairy/Beef Research Station
- The Brew-Hammond Energy Centre, College of Engineering
- Kumasi Center For Collaborative Research (KCCR) in collaboration with the German Bernhard Nocht Institute for Tropical Medicine
- National Institute for Mathematical Sciences (NIMS)
- Technology Consultancy Centre (TCC)
- Laboratory For Interdisciplinary Statistical Analysis (LISA)
- Regional Water and Environmental Sanitation Centre, Kumasi (RWESCK)
- Centre for Settlement Studies
- Regional Transport Research and Education Centre, Kumasi (TRECK)

== Media ==
=== Radio ===
Focus FM (94.3 FM) is the university's official radio station. Among its notable programmes are Morning Show, Drive Time, Teknokrat and Community Watch.

Focus FM is a network radio positioned on campus of Kwame Nkrumah University of Science and Technology, Kumasi. It was established in the year 2000 A.D. The stakeholders are the UNIVERSITY, Student Representative Counsel and the Graduate Student Association of Ghana. The center targets for the status quo of the station is to inform, teach and entertain the whole college network and the encompassing communities. The important supply of investment is from students’ contribution into Focus FM improvement account.

Ghanaian journalists who trained at Focus FM include:

- Nana Kwadwo Jantuah
- Edward Oppong Marfo
- Kwame Adinkra
- Kojo Akoto Boateng
- Louis Kwame Sakyiamah (Lexis Bill)
- Anita Kuma
- Kojo Akoto Boateng

=== Television ===
TEK TV is the official television station of the university.

== Awards and recognition ==
In 2023, the university was ranked by Times Higher Education as the number destination for quality education globally. This recognition was in alignment the Sustainable Development Goals (SDG 4).

In November 2019, KNUST was ranked as the best university in Ghana and West Africa by U.S. News & World Report and still holds the record in 2020. It was also ranked 14th in Africa and 706th in the world, with a global score of 42.4.

KNUST was the first university in West Africa to have won the 2018, 2019 and 2020 Pan African Universities Debate Championship consecutively. KNUST is the first university in Ghana to win the Ghana national rounds of the Philip C. Jessup International Law Moot Court Competition. The university has also won the Philip C. Jessup International Law Moot Court Competition a record three consecutive times. In December 2020 KNUST became the first university in Africa to have won the Pan African Universities Debating Championship for 3 consecutive times.

=== Department of Food Science and Technology ===
In December 2024, the West Africa Competitiveness Programme (WACOMP), through UNIDO and EU funding, enabled KNUST's Food Science and Technology Laboratory to become the first public university in Ghana accredited with ISO/IEC 17025:2017, providing SMEs with reliable food testing services.

== Notable people ==
=== Notable alumni ===
- Kofi Annan, UN Secretary-General and Nobel Peace Prize Laureate
- Kwaku Aning, international civil servant
- Hackman Owusu-Agyeman, politician
- Delese Mimi Darko, international civil servant
- Chinwe Egwim, economist, banker
- Aliu Mahama, Vice-president of Ghana (2001 to 2008)
- Edward Kwame Wiredu, former Chief Justice of Ghana
- Nana Konadu Agyeman Rawlings, first woman to be a candidate for president of Ghana
- Cassiel Ato Forson, politician
- Ibrahim Mahama, artist
- Thomas Mensah, chemical engineer
- Alex Mould, former CEO of GNPC
- Benjamin Asante, former CEO of Ghana Gas
- Amma Darko, novelist
- Chris Attoh, actor
- Nana Otuo Siriboe, Juabenhene
- King Tackie Teiko Tsuru II, Gã Mantse; president of the Ga Traditional Council
- Ernest Aryeetey, economist and former vice chancellor of the University of Ghana
- Yaw Osafo-Maafo, senior minister
- Pamela Mbabazi, chairperson of the Uganda Planning Authority
- Cecilia Amoafowaa Sefa, writer, poet and educator

=== Notable academics ===
- Francis Allotey, mathematician
- Aba Andam, physicist
- Ablade Glover, artist
- Marr Grounds, American / Australian artist and lecturer in architecture in 1966–7
- Thomas Mensah, chemical engineer
- Letitia Obeng, research scientist
