= College of Engineering (KNUST) =

College in Ghana

- Provost: Ing. Prof. Kwabena Biritwum Nyarko
- Academic staff: about 130
- Students: about 5,000
- Location: Kumasi, Ghana
- Colours: Black and Yellow
- Website: https://coe.knust.edu.gh/

The College of Engineering (CoE) is one of the six colleges of the Kwame Nkrumah University of Science and Technology (KNUST), in Kumasi, Ghana. It was established in October 1952 to prepare students for professional qualifications only. The College has since grown, expanded and now runs 15 BSc, 20 MSc, MPhil and PhD programmes under 3 faculties; the faculty of Electrical and Computer Engineering, the faculty of Civil and Geo Engineering and the faculty of Mechanical and Chemical Engineering and 10 academic departments.

== Academics ==
The College of Engineering offers undergraduate programmes leading to the award of a Bachelor of Science degree as well as postgraduate programmes leading to the award of MSc, MPhil or PhD degrees.

=== BSc Programmes ===
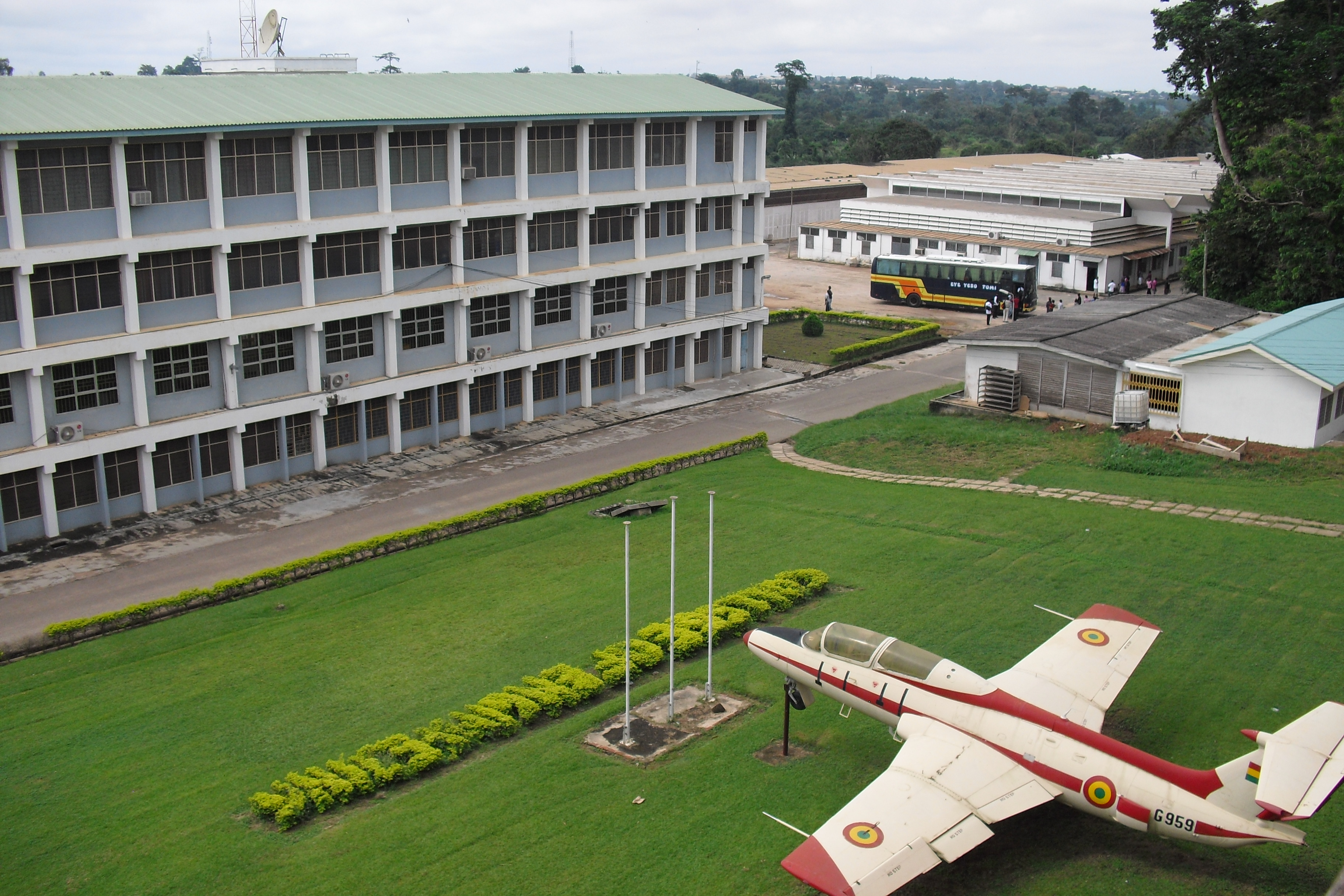
College of Engineering, KNUST - courtyard

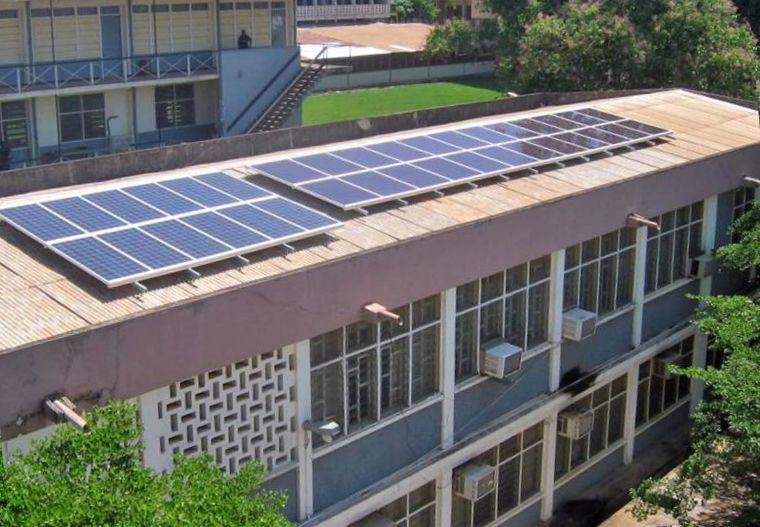
Solar panels on a roof in the College of Engineering, KNUST

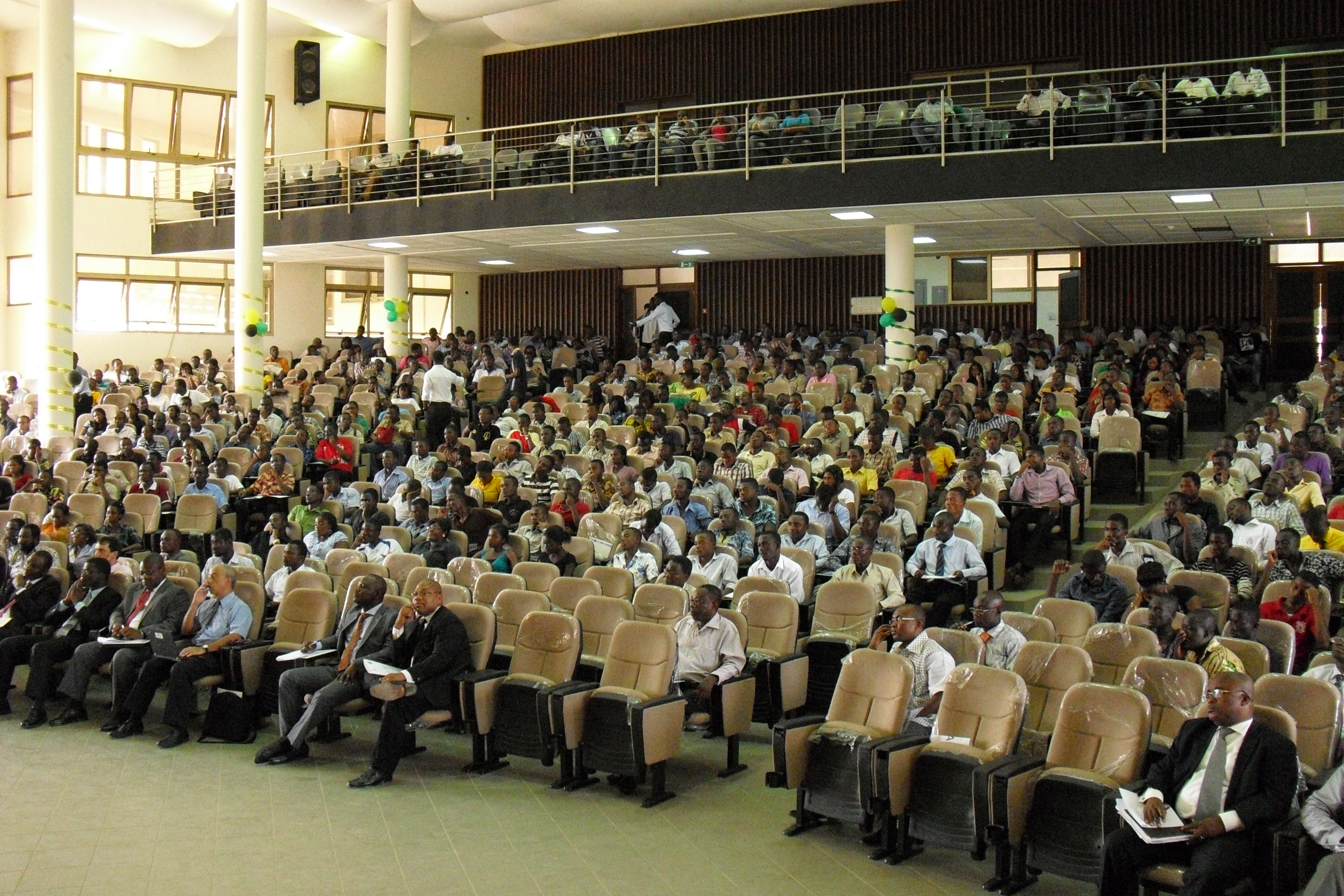
College of Engineering, KNUST - New Auditorium

- Aerospace Engineering
- Agricultural and Biosystems Engineering
- Automobile Engineering
- Geomatic Engineering
- Biomedical Engineering
- Chemical Engineering
- Civil Engineering
- Computer Engineering
- Electrical/Electronic Engineering
- Geological Engineering
- Industrial Engineering
- Materials Engineering
- Marine Engineering
- Mechanical Engineering
- Metallurgical Engineering
- Petroleum Engineering
- Petrochemical Engineering
- Telecommunication Engineering

=== MSc Programmes ===
- Chemical Engineering
- Environmental Resources Management
- Thermo Fluids
- Design and Production
- Applied Mechanics
- Soil and Water Engineering
- Food and Postharvest Engineering
- Agricultural Machinery Engineering
- Agro-Environmental Engineering
- Telecommunication Engineering
- Water Supply and Environmental Sanitation
- Water Resources Engineering and Management
- Road and Transportation Engineering

=== Departments ===
- Agricultural Engineering
- Chemical Engineering
- Civil Engineering
- Computer Engineering
- Electrical and Electronic Engineering
- Geological Engineering
- Geomatic Engineering
- Industrial Engineering
- Materials Engineering
- Mechanical Engineering
- Petroleum Engineering
- Telecommunication Engineering

== Research Centres ==
- Technology Consultancy Centre (TCC)
- The Brew-Hammond Energy Centre (TBHEC)
- Transport Research and Education Centre, Kumasi
- KNUST Engineering Project
- KNUST-College of Engineering Innovation Centre
- Dipper Lab
- Regional Water and Environmental Sanitation Centre, Kumasi
