= List of rulers of Gã (Nkran) =

This is a list of Kings of Accra, rulers of the Gã State in southern Ghana. Their title was Gã Mantse.

Enstoolment	Incumbent
1510	Foundation of Gã state (Akra Kingdom)
Tunnmaa dynasty (We dynasty)
1510	Ayi Kushi
1535	Ayite
1560	Koi Nalai
1585	Owura Mampong Okai
1610	Dode Akaibi
1635	Okaikoi
1660	Ashangmor
1680	Ayi
1700	Ayikuma Teiko Bah
1733	Ofori Tibi
1740	Tetteh Ahene Akwa
1782	Teiko Tsuru
1787	Sabah Osepree
1802	Amugi I
1812	Kudza Okai
1823	Adama Akuredze
1825	Tackie Kome I
1856	Ofoli Gakpo (regent)
1859	Yaotey
1862	Tackie Tawia I
1902	Interregnum
1904	Tackie Obilie I
1918	Interregnum
1919	Tackie Yarboi
1929	Interregnum
1933	Tackie Obilie II
1943	Interregnum
1944	Tackie Tawia II
1947	Interregnum
1948	Nii Tackie Kome II
1965	Nii Amugi II
2005	Interregnum
2020	King Tackie Teiko Tsuru II

== See also ==
- Ghana
- Accra
- Gold Coast
