= Assault on Osu =

1678 Attack on Osu between Akwamu and Accrans forces

- Part of the Gã-Akwamu War
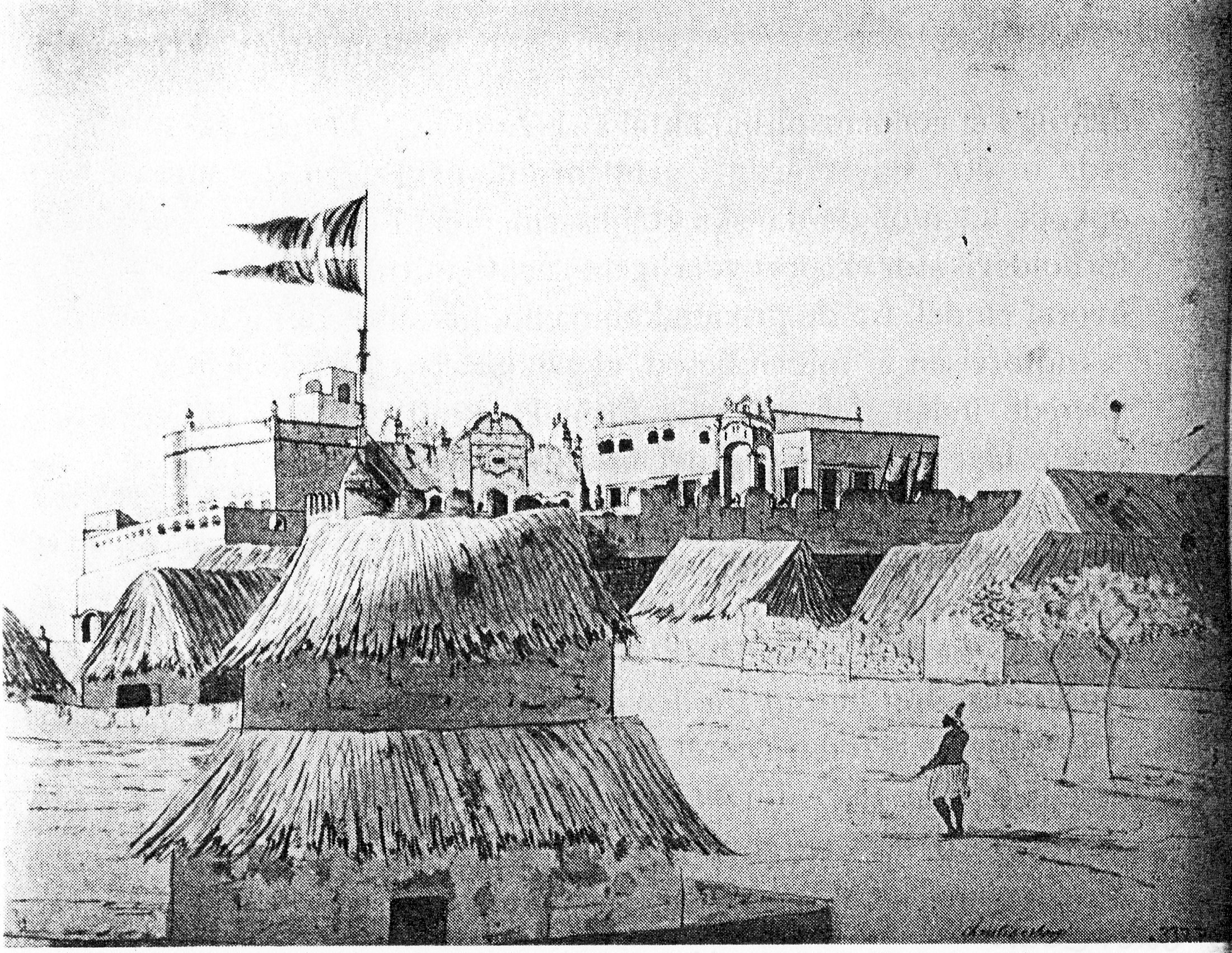
- Drawing of Christiansborg and houses of Osu on the North side of the fort, Early-18th Century
Date	1678
Location	Osu, Accra (Modern-day Ghana) 5°33′14″N 0°10′30″W
Result	Danish-Accran victory

Belligerents
Akwamu	Ga-Adangbe; Supported by: Denmark-Norway; Danish Gold Coast

Commanders and leaders
Ansa Sasraku II	Ofori I (Denmark–Norway) Johan Ullrich

The Assault on Osu (Danish: Angrebet på Orsu) was an assault on the coastal village of Osu Castle by the Kingdom of Akwamu against local Accrans, who received support from the Danes at Fort Christiansborg. The assault resulted in military failure for the Akwamu, mainly due to Danish artillery, and the Akwamu were forced to retreat.

== Background ==
The Akwamu State began its formation of an empire in the latter half of the seventeenth century. The empire's primary expansion route was eastwards, which made it come into confrontations with various local tribes, which in most cases got absorbed or subjugated by the Akwamu. It seems clear that the Akwamu State had extended its dominion to the area of modern-day Akwapim by the middle of the seventeenth century.

At the arrival of the Europeans, Great Accra was the strongest power in the region. This is exemplified in the 1670s, when King Okaikoi (Note: Danish: Kanckoy) was able to summon a nine thousand strong army, which no European fortification could pose a challenge against. This meant that if any European nation came in conflict with the Great Accra, it would divert the lucrative Atlantic slave trade to the other European nations also present in the area. Such threat posed by the Great Accra, led to constant attempts by the Europeans to befriend the African Kingdom.

=== Weakening of Accra ===
Rivers

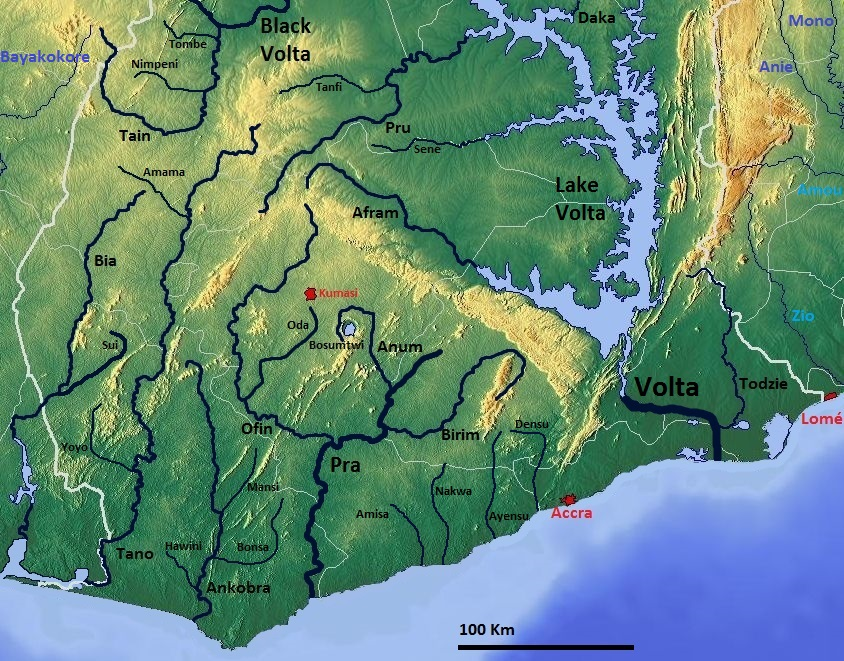
River systems in the south of Ghana

Akwamu naturally turned its attention to the lucrative trade market between Accra and the Europeans. The initial Akwamu policy appears to be, to achieve control of the trade routes leading from the interior to the coast, which would guarantee a substantial amount of money from tolls.

In 1646, Accra attacked Larteh. In response, Akwamu blockaded Accra and the trading routes controlled by Akwamu were sealed. This led to serious damage to the Accran economy. This, together with an ongoing civil war, would guarantee the ultimate collapse of Accra, yet this would only be shown sound 30 years later.

Akwamu launched its major offensive against Accra in 1677, under king Ansa Sasraku II. The initial offensive was directed at Great Accra, the capital city. The Accra king, Okaikoi I, offered resistance, but was captured and beheaded with his eldest son. Additionally, Great Accra was sacked and burned.

== Assault ==
=== Ofori I's strategy ===
Accran resistance was not over with the loss of their capital, however. A young son of Okaikoi named Ofori, had escaped the sack of Great Accra, moving the state capital to Little Accra and assumed leadership, succeeding his beheaded father. Ofori sought the assistance of the Danes, Dutch and English in holding back further Akwamu expansion on the coast. By this time Accran towns had already started to grow around each of the European forts. These towns must have received a sizeable number of refugees from Great Accra. It is likely that Akwamu hesitated to launch attacks upon the Accran coastal towns.

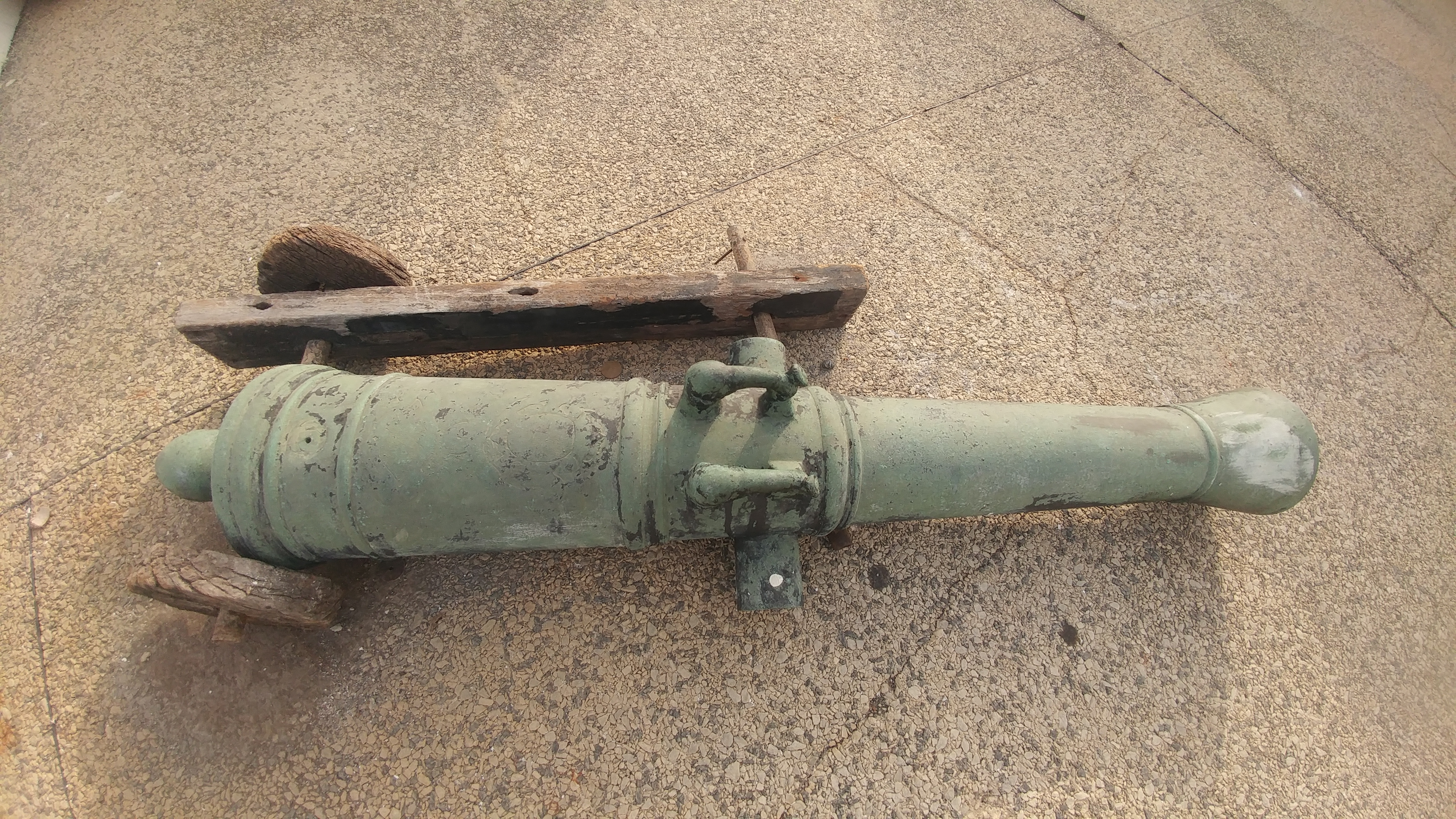
An Old machine gun at Christianborg castle in Osu, Accra.

One of these Accran towns which got attacked was Osu, which was located in close proximity to the Danish fort and capital of the Danish Gold Coast, Christiansborg. In 1678, the Akwamu State's warrior army launched an attack on Osu as a part of their campaign against Accra. The close and compacted warriors must have been an easy target for the cannons at Christiansborg Castle. In any case, the Akwamu army was forced to retreat because of the heavy fire dealt by the Danish artillery, and abandon their attack on Osu.

Since the Danes had forced the Akwamu armies to retreat from Osu, it may be supposed that as long as the Danes at Christiansborg and the Accrans at Osu, could pose and constitute a hostile left flank for the Akwamu, for as long would the Akwamu not make any significant threat of a frontal attack on Small Accra itself. This became reality when King Ansa Sasraku, the following year, directed a part of his war force to conquer the Kingdom of Ladoku.

== Aftermath ==
Fort Fredericksborg

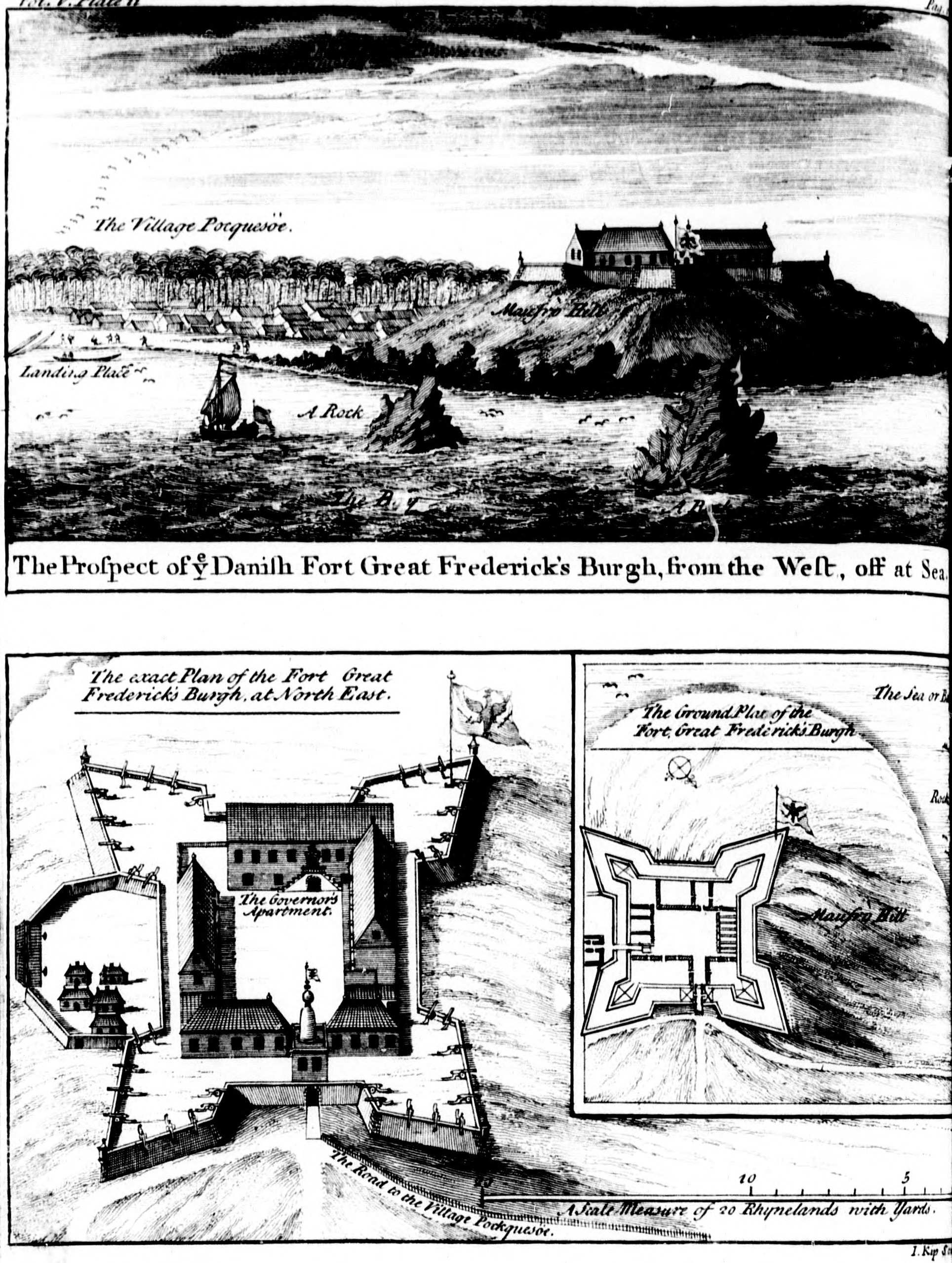
Illustration from A Collection of Voyages and Travels

In the same year as the conquest of Ladoku, the Danish garrison at Fort Christiansborg was discontented in a revolt, led by Pieter Bolt. He mutinied and seized the fort, quickly selling it to the Portuguese governor of St. Tomé, Julião de Campos Barreto.

No actual evidence supports the involvement of Akwamu in the mutiny at Fort Christiansborg, yet they certainly welcomed the regime change. The Portuguese takeover led Ansa Sasraku to once more turn his attention to Little Accra. Some sources (Note: Ludvig Ferdinand Rømer, Erik Tylleman and Jean Barbot) say that the war between the Akwamu and Accras continued, now taking place near the European fortifications. This resulted in the burning of Little Accra, and Ofori I fled for the second time, now to Afutu, where he was welcomed by the king, Ahen Panyin Ashríve as king-in-exile. Furthermore, the Danes now had their headquarters in Afutu at Fort Frederiksborg. The Danish governor, Magnus Prang, and Ofori both had interests in regaining their Accran possessions, and agreed to afford each other every assistance.

In 1682 the Portuguese garrison revolted and imprisoned Julião de Campos, and the following year the king of Portugal, Afonso VI, ordered the evacuation of the fort. The Danes in response, reoccupied the fort, and withdrew their alliance with Ofori in order not to further antagonize the Akwamu.

== See also ==
- Sagbadre War – 1784 Danish punitive expedition in Gold Coast
- Dano-Dutch War – War between the Dutch and Danish, 1661–1665
- King Okaikoi
- Ashanti Empire – Former Akan empire centred on present-day Ghana
- Siege of Dansborg (1644) – Siege in Tranquebar, India 1644
