= King Tackie Teiko Tsuru II =

Ghanaian traditional ruler

- Gã Mantse
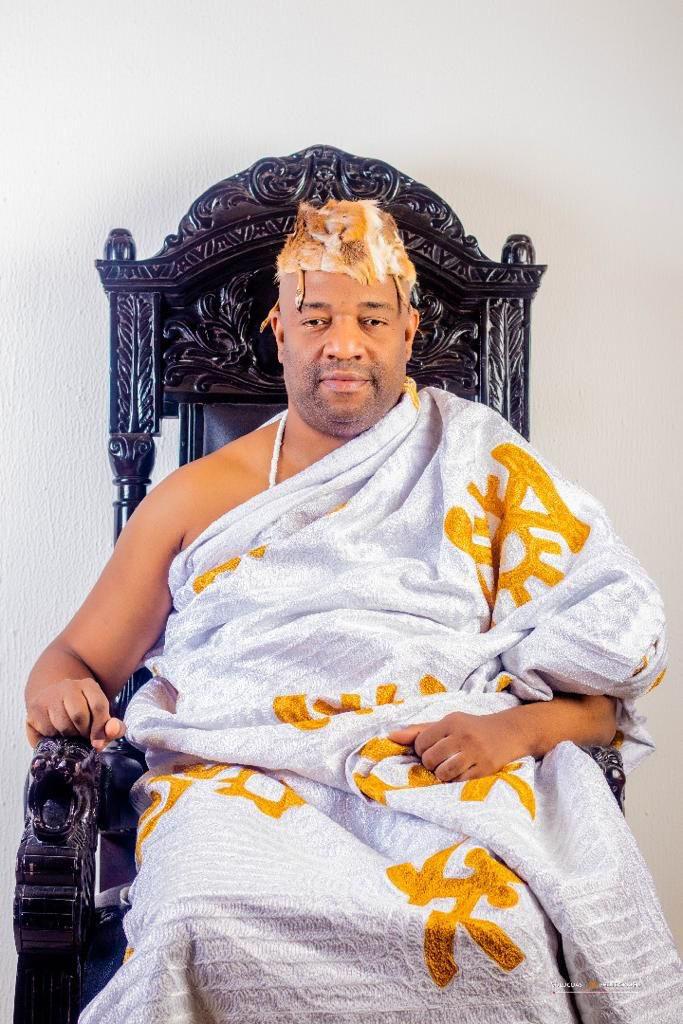

Gã Mantse
- Reign: 9 May 2020 – present
- Coronation: 9 May 2020
- Predecessor: Nii Amugi II
- Born: Kelvin Nii Tackie Abia; 2 August 1971 (age 55); Accra, Greater Accra Region, Ghana
- Father: Prince Ebenezer Nii Armah Tackie

King Tackie Teiko Tsuru II (born Kelvin Nii Tackie Abia; 2 August 1971) is the Gã Mantse of the Ga State enstooled on 9 May 2020.

== Early life and education ==
King Tackie Teiko Tsuru II was born as Kelvin Nii Tackie Abia in Accra on 2 August 1971 to Dr. Ebenezer Nii Armah Tackie. He had his secondary education at Ghana Secondary School in Koforidua. He holds a Bachelor of Arts and an MBA from the Kwame Nkrumah University of Science and Technology. He also holds a PhD. from the University of California.

== Gã Manste (2020–present) ==
Kelvin Nii Tackie Abia was enstooled as Gã Mantse of the Ga-Mashie people on 9 May 2020. He is also the President of the Ga Traditional Council. In October 2025, he pledged to support the Musicians Union of Ghana (MUSIGA) as they mark their golden jubilee.

== Career ==
He began his career as a researcher and assistant director at the Ghana Broadcasting Corporation. He was also the founder of Keeda Production Limited, while serving as a resource person and advisor to the Liberal Studies department at Kumasi Technical University and a lecturer at KNUST. He also served as a running mate to Jacob Osei Yeboah as an independent candidate in the 2012 Presidential election.

== Controversies ==
In June 2025, the Court of Appeal in Kumasi ruled to announce King Tackie Adama Latse II as the legitimated Ga Mantse. A counter ruling, the Supreme Court of Ghana presided over by Justice Pwamang unanimously ruled against the judgement of the Kumasi High Court and reinstated him as the legitimate Ga Mantse.
