= 2N =

2N or 2-N may refer to:

- 2N or 2°N, the 2nd parallel north latitude
- MI 2N, a type of electric multiple unit running on the French RER rail network
- 2N, a prefix labelling certain JEDEC transistors, notably the 2N2222
- 2N, an indicator of a redundancy level in (for example) an uninterruptible power supply configuration
- Powers of 2 (2^{n})
- In genetics, 2n = x refers to a diploid chromosome number of x
- NJ 2-N; see New Jersey Route 17
- MI 2N series double-decker train; see RER A
- HP 2N, ISO/IEC 8859-2 character set on printers by Hewlett-Packard

== See also ==
- N2 (disambiguation)
