= Nana Kwadwo Jantuah =

Broadcast Journalist

- Born: Samuel Kwadwo Jantuah; August 28, 1985 (age 41); Ghana
- Education: Prempeh College
- Alma mater: Kwame Nkrumah University of Science and Technology; Graduate School of Governance and Leadership (GSGL)
- Occupation: Broadcast journalist
- Employer: Multimedia Group Limited
- Known for: Host of Nhyira FM Morning Show
- Title: General Manager, Focus FM (KNUST)

Nana Kwadwo Jantuah (known as Samuel Kwadwo Jantuah, born 28 August 1985) is a Ghanaian Broadcast Journalist and formerly worked with Multimedia Group Limited. He was the host of Nhyira FM’s morning show in Kumasi for five years. He is also the General Manager of Focus FM in the Kwame Nkrumah University of Science and Technology. He is currently the Programs Head and morning show host of Ahenfie FM/TV also in Kumasi.

== Life and career ==
Nana Kwadwo Jantuah began his media career with Kwame Nkrumah University of Science and Technology campus based radio, Focus FM where he rose through the ranks as reporter, news anchor, producer and show host. He later worked as the morning show host at Shaft in Obuasi during school break while studying in Kwame Nkrumah University of Science and Technology before joining Light FM and Sunsum FM.

Journalist Nana Kwadwo Jantuah won both Radio Personality of the Year (Ashanti) and Media Personality of the Year at the Floodlight Media Excellence Awards 2025.

== Education ==
He attended Prempeh College for his secondary education and continued to obtain his first degree in Bachelor of Science in Building Technology from Kwame Nkrumah University (KNUST) of Science and Technology. Nana Kwadwo Jantuah then pursued Governance and Leadership at the Graduate School of Governance and Leadership (GSGL-Accra), 2012. In 2014 he graduated from KNUST with Commonwealth Executive Masters in Business Administration.
