= African Medicines Agency =

Proposed agency of the African Union

Agency overview
- Formed: Proposed
- Jurisdiction: African Union
- Headquarters: Rwanda
- Agency executive: Dr Delese Mimi Darko (Director General)

Map

The African Medicines Agency (AMA) is a proposed specialised agency of the African Union (AU) intended to facilitate the harmonisation of medical regulation throughout the African Union. Following a similar model to that of the European Medicines Agency, it is intended to have a wide scope covering medicines, traditional medicine, and medical devices.

The AMA is the latest step in efforts by the AU and regional African bodies to improve medical capacity in the continent. Such efforts are intended to address a deficiency in drug production and challenges posed by counterfeit and substandard products. Once it is created, it is expected that the AMA will supervise and absorb roles currently carried out by other bodies, such as regional harmonisation efforts and pan-AU creations such as the African Medicines Regulatory Harmonization (AMRH) initiative and its technical committees such as the African Vaccines Regulatory Forum (AVAREF), the Evaluation of Medicinal Products Technical Committees (EMP-TC) and the African Medical Devices Forum (AMDF).

The Treaty for the Establishment of the African Medicines Agency was adopted by the AU in February 2019. It came into effect on 5 November 2021, after ratification from the 15th AU member states, Cameroon.

The headquarters of the AMA will be located in Rwanda.

The inaugural Director General of the AMA has been appointed in June 2025: Dr Delese Mimi Darko from Ghana (former CEO of the Ghana FDA).

== History ==
The proposed African Medicines Agency (AMA) is a continuation of existing medical regulatory harmonisation efforts in the continent. Across Africa it is estimated that only 3% of required drugs are produced, with medicines not readily available during health emergencies. The roughly 375 medicine manufacturers on the continent produce only 10–30% of drugs used in Africa. Another challenge is the proliferation of substandard and counterfeit medical products. Porous borders make it easy for such products to move within the continent, and there is significant variation in the quality of current medical regulation between countries in the African Union (AU). While every country except the Sahrawi Arab Democratic Republic has a National Medicines Regulatory Authorities (NMRAs), many are unable to carry out many expected essential functions. The WHO considers 90% of African countries to have minimal to no medical regulatory capacity. Many medicines are not distributed to some countries due to the length of time needed to receive regulatory approval.

In 2005 the AU decided to create a "Pharmaceutical Manufacturing Plan for Africa". Under this the African Medicines Regulatory Harmonization (AMRH) initiative was established in 2009, and fully launched in 2012. The AMRH represented the first time that NMRAs within Africa worked together.

During the 1st African Ministers of Health meeting, which ran on 14–17 April 2014 in Luanda, member states were requested to allocate resources for a potential African Medicines Agency as part of their efforts to improve medical regulatory harmonisation. The same year saw the creation of 11 "Regional Centres of Regulatory Excellence". The proposed agency was inspired by the European Medicines Agency. It is expected that the work of the AMRH will eventually come under the purview of the AMA.

In 2016 the Model Law on Medical Products Regulation was endorsed by the AU. This law serves as a model for national regulatory laws and facilitates harmonisation between countries, and is promoted by AMRH. An existing multi-country vaccine testing scheme, African Vaccines Regulatory Forum (AVAREF), is expected to expand under the AMA to cover other medicine and medical devices.

The concept of an African Medicines Agency had unanimous support within the AU. The Treaty for the Establishment of the African Medicines Agency was adopted in February 2019 during the 32nd Ordinary Session of the Assembly of the African Union. This was done through decision Assembly/AU/Dec.735(XXXII), which reaffirmed decision EX.CL/1141(XXXIV) from the 34th Executive Council ordinary session.

Countries can sign the treaty either at the AU headquarters in Addis Ababa or in their own territory. It was written to enter into force 30 days after the 15th instrument of ratification and ascension was deposited with the AU.

The AU's Specialised Technical Committee Meeting on Health, Population and Drug Control called for "urgent" ratification in August 2019, at which point only four out of the 15 necessary countries had ratified the treaties. Support also came from the AU Commission for Social Affairs.

Dr. Margaret Agama-Anyetei, head of health, nutrition, and population at the African Union Commission, has stated that the COVID-19 pandemic highlights the need for such a body, and hopes that quick ratification would allow the AMA to play a role in distributing relevant drugs and vaccines throughout Africa in the coming years. The Pan-African Parliament has also cited COVID-19 as an example of the need for the AMA. In June 2020, the "Africa Medical Supplies Platform" was established by the AU to help combat COVID-19.

== Structure ==
The African Medicines Agency is expected to work with regional bodies, similar to those underpinning the African Economic Community.

The AMA is designed as a special agency of the African Union. Its aims will be to strengthen the capacity of AU countries to regulate medicines and related products, provide regulatory guidance, and harmonise medical regulation efforts across the continent. This harmonisation covers the actions of member states, the African Union Commission, Regional Economic Communities (RECs), and Regional Health Organisations. The AMA will build upon closer regional integration, which has already served to reduce drug prices and the time needed for regulatory approval. The ARMH worked through RECs, and it has been suggested that these regional bodies become technical working groups within the AMA. Countries who have signed and ratified the agreement will be asked to bid to host its headquarters.

Medical products that would be covered include drugs, vaccines, medical devices, blood products, diagnostic tools, and traditional medicine. It is expected the body would work closely with the existing Africa Centres for Disease Control and Prevention.

The AMU is viewed as important due to the development of the African Continental Free Trade Area, which is expected to develop into the African Economic Community by 2028. Regional regulatory harmonisation within the East African Community, developed under the AMRH, was based on a free trade agreement within that grouping.

== Status ==
The Treaty for the Establishment of the African Medicines Agency came into effect on 5 November 2021 after the ratification of 15 countries. As of November 2024, 37 out of the 55 Members of the African Union have either signed or ratified the treaty.

=== Signatures ===
- Rwanda – 12 June 2019
- Sahrawi Arab Democratic Republic – 7 July 2019
- Algeria – 7 July 2019
- Madagascar - 1 August 2019
- Ghana – 2 August 2019
- Mali – 29 October 2019
- Benin – 3 December 2019
- Tunisia – 19 December 2019
- Morocco – 22 December 2019
- Senegal – 9 January 2020
- Chad – 24 January 2020
- Guinea – 7 February 2020
- Seychelles – 9 February 2020
- Niger – 9 February 2020
- Sierra Leone – 10 February 2020
- Gabon – 20 April 2020
- etc.

=== Ratification ===
- Rwanda – 18 December 2019 ratified, 6 January 2020 deposited
- Mali – 9 April 2020 ratified, 2 June 2020 deposited
- Burkina Faso – 14 April 2020; 9 July 2020 deposited
- Seychelles – 13 August 2020; 23 November 2020 deposited
- Namibia – 19 January 2021 ratified; 18 February 2021 deposited
- Ghana – 24 February 2021; 16 March 2021 deposited
- Guinea – 21 April 2021 ratified; 7 May 2021 deposited
- Sierra Leone – 28 May 2021 ratified; 14 June 2021 deposited
- Algeria – 10 June 2021 ratified; 22 June 2021 deposited
- Tunisia – 14 July 2021 ratified
- Morocco - 6 July 2020
- etc.
