= Ga Traditional Council =

Traditional Administration in Ghana

The Ga Traditional Council is one of the 12 Traditional Councils in the Greater Accra Region, Ghana. It oversees the Ga Traditional Area, . It is also the traditional body in charge of enstooling the Ga-Mantse and Ga-Manye

== Background ==
The Ga-Traditional Council are the traditional custodians of the Ga-Traditional area, which forms one of the six traditional areas in the Accra, the capital city of Ghana. Per their mandate, they hold the authority to instill directions of the restriction on activities such as ban on noise making and funerals to preserve the traditional heritage of the Ga-Adangbe tribe. They can also revoke chiefly titles as in the case of Nii Kotey Ga, the Asafoatse of the Asere Djorshie.

== Leadership ==
The Ga Traditional Council is led by the President of the Council. Since 2021, the President of the Ga Traditional Council is His Royal Majesty King Tackie Teiko Tsuru II, who doubles as the Ga Mantse.
