= NO2 (disambiguation) =

NO_{2} is nitrogen dioxide.

NO_{2} may also refer to:

- Nitrite ion, NO_{2}^{−}
- Nitronium ion, NO_{2}^{+}
- –NO_{2}, nitro group, characteristic of nitro compounds
- "NO_{2}", a song by American rock band Phish, from their album Phish

== See also ==
- Number Two (disambiguation)
- N02 (N-zero-two)
