= KNUST Faculty of Law =

Faculty of Law, KNUST
- Established: 2003
- Dean: Chris Adomako-Kwakye, Ph.D
- Location: Kumasi Campus
- Colours: White and black
- Website: http://law.knust.edu.gh/

Kwame Nkrumah University of Science and Technology Faculty of Law is the second law school to be established in Ghana. It is under the College of Humanities and Social Sciences.

== History ==
KNUST provides education for scientists and technologists. Since the graduates of the university have to function in society, the Faculty of Social Sciences was established to offer courses in liberal arts and social sciences. In 1970 a department of law was established in the Faculty of Social Sciences to teach land law as a 'core' subject in the BSc Land Economy and Management programme. Not long afterwards a combined honours degree of Economics/Law, Sociology/ Law, Geography/Law etc. was developed. The Department of Law also taught law courses in other faculties of the university.

In 2002, the university decided that the social sciences faculty must undergo modern transformation, allowing a Faculty of Law to emerge. In April 2003, the Council of KNUST approved a 4-year LLB programme, and the first cohort of LLB students were admitted into the Faculty of Law in August 2003. The Pioneer Faculty that started the newly approved 4- year LLB programme were Rev. Prof. E H Ofori- Amankwah, Professor Oswald Senedza, Dr Renee Morhe, Dr. Ernest Owusu-Dapaa, Dr. Anane, George Sarpong, Michael Alokore, JC Tarchie, Kwame Anyimadu Antwi, Albert Amankwah and Mr Addai

KNUST provides training in law and promotes the development of a distinctly Ghanaian body of law through teaching and research. The graduates of the law faculty will fulfil the manpower needs of the country as graduates of law are required not only to practise law, but to work in important sectors of the economy.

=== Teaching and learning strategies ===
Course delivery includes seminars, tutorials, workshops and moots. There is use of case studies as vehicles for exercising particular topics, for example, Introduction to Trial Advocacy Course requires students to act out a simulated case, and to learn the taking of instructions to the trial of the matter. In the Law of Contract, a case study is used to illustrate aspects of the law including the formation, terms, discharge and remedies. Students will be involved in oral presentations as well as written submissions.

Students acquire intellectual skills (research, analysis and problem-solving); transferable skills (study & communication, skills, time-management and group work; and legal skills (drafting, research, advocacy, interviewing and negotiation).

Assessment on the LLB programme follows university regulations and consists of written coursework, oral presentations and examinations. Where appropriate group work as well as individual performance is assessed.

=== Law Library ===
The Law Library provides a research level, retrospective, and current collection of Ghanaian and African law materials; and provides the classic professional texts relating to the law of countries such as the UK, Australia, Canada, New Zealand and the USA.

Students have access to photocopying, microfilm and microfiche equipment, commercial databases on CDROM and the library's own databases, which will be developed as a basis for a Ghana legal information service. The library staff develop and maintain the collections, on a reserve and loan system; they help students to find the meanings of legal citations, and to locate the cited material.
