= Dode Akaabi =

Guan Obutu or Awutu Princess

Queen Dodi Akaabi also known as Naa Dode Akabi I ruled the Ga Land from 1610 to 1635 and was a Guan Obutu or Awutu princess who was married to the wealthy Ga King, Mampong Okai. The Obutus/Awutus were known for pomp and opulence and were much into gold trade.

== History ==
After the death of her husband, she succeeded him as the first and only Ga ruler who was much feared for her boldness and strict legislation that focused mostly on uplifting women. She is credited with bringing much pomp and opulence to the royal throne including adorning of kings with much jewelries and also for the tradition of sitting on stools which hitherto were taken to wars and were used to uplift the spirits of the troops. She sat on the stools which have a common tradition now to visualize her authority over her people.

She led her people to several wars and was a great warrior and owned many lands even beyond the Ga land and conquered many lands. However, she had harsh legislation for men who mistreated women, raped women or disrespected women in any way and this made her hated among her people.

She was buried alive by some men she had severely punished. Her son, Okaikoi, the warrior king, ruled after her.
