= Kojo Akoto Boateng =

- Born: December 29, 1986 (age 39)
- Citizenship: Ghanaian
- Education: KNUST
- Occupation: Broadcaster
- Employer: Multimedia Group Limited
- Organization: Joy FM
- Spouse: Adjoa
- Children: 1

Kojo Akoto Boateng (born 29 December 1986) is a Ghanaian media personality, broadcaster, and event host. He is currently a member of the Joy FM morning show team, where he contributes to the station’s current affairs and lifestyle programming.

== Career ==
Boateng began his broadcasting career at Focus FM, the campus radio station of the Kwame Nkrumah University of Science and Technology (KNUST). He later joined Kapital Radio in Kumasi under the Imperial Broadcasting Company, where he served as Drive Time host and later hosted the station’s flagship morning show, Daybreak Kapital.

In 2013, he joined Citi FM and Citi TV, where he held various roles including Head of New Media and lead of the Research Department. He was also a panelist on the Citi Breakfast Show and hosted programs such as MOGO (Music of Ghanaian Origin), Business Olympics, Family Day Out, and Citi Roundtable Discussions.

In December 2023, he was a member of the team that organized the Afua Asantewaa Singathon, an attempt to break the Guinness World Record for the longest individual singing marathon.

Boateng has also served as a Master of Ceremonies for a range of corporate and entertainment events in Ghana. These include the Guinness Africa Hero Awards, MTN Apps Challenge, MTN Business World Executive Breakfast, World Bank 60th Anniversary, Fidelity Bank Corporate Games, Miss Tourism Ghana, Ghana Entrepreneurs Awards, Unilever End-of-Year Party, and Total Ghana Startupper.

== Personal life ==
Kojo Akoto Boateng is married to Adjoa and has a son.
