= National Institute of Immunology =

National Institute of Immunology may refer to:

- National Institute of Immunology (Instituto Nacional de Inmunología), in Hospital San Juan de Dios, Bogotá, Colombia
- National Institute of Immunology, India

== See also ==
- NII (disambiguation)
