= Delese Mimi Darko =

Ghanaian pharmacist

Delese Mimi Darko BA, MA
- Education: Achimota School, Bachelor of Pharmacy, Kwame Nkrumah University of Science and Technology, Business Administration MA, University of Northampton
- Occupations: Pharmacist, CEO
- Employer(s): Food and Drugs Authority, Ghana; African Medicines Agency
- Organization: African Vaccines Regulatory Forum

Delese Mimi Darko is a Ghanaian pharmacist. In 2017 she became the first woman to be appointed chief executive officer of the Ghana Food and Drugs Authority by Nana Akuffo-Addo. In 2025 she was appointed Inaugural Director General of the African Medicines Agency.

== Early life and education ==
Darko attended Achimota School in Accra. In 1991 she graduated from the Kwame Nkrumah University of Science and Technology, where she trained as a pharmacist. She later obtained a master's degree in business administration from the University of Northampton.

Her father is K. G. Osei. She is the fourth of five children.

== Career ==
Darko joined the Food and Drugs Board in the early 1990s. The organisation was subsequently renamed the Food and Drugs Authority (FDA), and Darko has served there in various capacities. She has worked in every department of the institution, starting from the laboratory. She also helped in the setting up of two technical advisory committees to assist the board in their work. She was the designer of the current logo of the FDA. Darko was the lead for a collaboration between the FDA and the UK-MHRA in the area of medicine safety, which is now multi-divisional at the FDA with anti-counterfeiting as one of the key areas of support. Prior to her appointment as the chief executive officer, she was the head of Safety, Monitoring and Clinical Trial Division.

In 2025 the Conference of State Parties of the African Medicines Agency (AMA) appointed her as the inaugural Director General of the Agency.

== Other activities ==
Since it began in 2017, Darko has been a member the Scientific Advisory Group of the WHO R&D Blueprint, a global strategy and preparedness plan for research activities during epidemics, chaired by Jeremy Farrar. Other international and local advisory committees she serves on include:

- Coalition for Epidemic Preparedness Innovations, Member of the Scientific Advisory Board
- Council for International Organizations of Medical Sciences, Member of the Working Group on Vaccine Safety
- African Vaccines Regulatory Forum, Chair of the Technical Coordinating Committee
- Rural Outreach and Aid Mission, Member of the Board of Trustees

== Recognition ==
In 2018 Darko was nominated for the United Nations Interagency Task Force on the Prevention and Control of NCDs Awards.

In 2019, Darko was awarded the GliTZ Africa award for Ghana Women of the Year Honours for excellence in health. She was also given a special recognition award at the 13th Gong-gong Awards.

=== Awards ===
- 3rd African Public Sector Conference and Awards- Best Public Sector CEO.

== Personal life ==
She is married to Rexford Darko.
