= Treaty for the Establishment of the African Medicines Agency =

The Treaty for the establishment of the African Medicines Agency is an international treaty, pending ratification and accession by at least 15 Member States of the African Union, to establish the African Medicines Agency (AMA) as a specialized agency of the African Union. The aim of the treaty, by establishing the AMA, is to address the issue of the availability and quality of medical products in Africa by coordinating the continent's regulatory structure regarding the production and distribution of pharmaceuticals, medical devices and other medical products.

== History ==
The treaty was adopted by the thirty-second ordinary session of the Assembly of the African Union held in Addis Ababa, Ethiopia on 11 February 2019.

== Ratification and entry into force ==
Article 38 of the treaty requires that 15 Member States of the African Union submit an instrument of ratification and accession in order for the treaty to enter into force, which occurs 30 days after the fifteenth instrument is received by the Chairperson of the African Union Commission.

Countries that have signed, ratified and acceded to the treaty
Country	Date of signature	Date of ratification	Date of accession
Algeria	7 July 2019		
Ghana	2 August 2019		
Madagascar	1 August 2019		
Mali	29 October 2019		
Morocco	22 October 2019		
Rwanda	12 June 2019		
Saharawi	7 July 2019		

== Provisions ==
In addition to the preamble, the treaty consists of 41 articles.
