= Okai Koi =

Okai Koi was a warrior king who formed the Akwashong, supreme military command, which provided the basis of renewal of Ga-Dangme military power.

== History ==
Okai Koi (other wording is Kankuey in Togo) was the son of Mampong Okai (or Ekuey in Togo) and Dode Akaabi (or Adudey Akpabie in Togo). King Okai Koi signed a treaty with Denmark for a permanent trading post-fort Christiansborg on August 18, 1661. He ceded the beach of Osu to the Danes to start the building of the Christiansborg.

His own generals eventually betrayed him when they deserted him in a war against the Akwamus. Okai Koi cursed the deserters and blessed the loyal generals. After he finally took his own life. The death was the beginning of a period of uncertainty in Ga-Dangme history. Women and children, thousand of them were evacuated from Ayawaso because of his courage. His death marked the end of the Ayawaso period;

Majority of the Ga's retired to Aneho (formerly named Little Popo) a city currently located in the neighboring country Togo and the others resettled or joined kinsmen along the coastal strip. Trades were increasing with Europeans which had rendered the coast or Little Accra (Ga Mashi) attractive more than Ayawaso.

Prince Ashangmong (other wording is Asshiongbon) continued a guerrilla warfare against the Akwamu, driving them to Fanti. Prince Ashangmong was the son of Okai Yai, the brother of Okai Koi. The prince then retired with all the Ga from Labadi and Ningo to the Little Popo (Aneho).

== See also ==
- Ga Mantse
