= Regional Water and Environmental Sanitation Centre Kumasi =

Research centre on water and sanitation in Ghana

Coordinates: 6°39′59″N 1°33′57″W

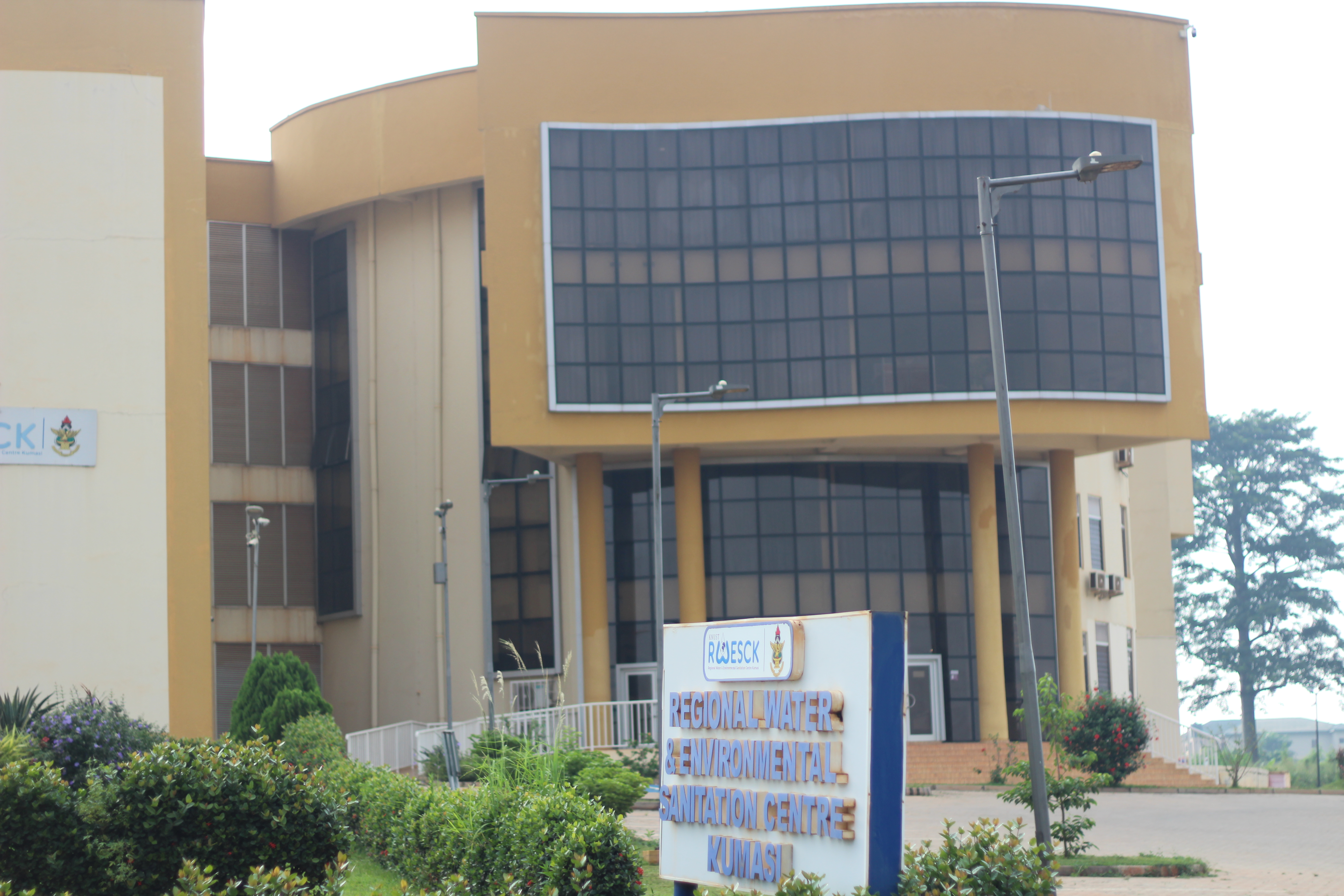
RWESCK Building on KNUST Campus

The Regional Water and Environmental Sanitation Centre Kumasi (RWESCK) is a research and postgraduate training centre at the Kwame Nkrumah University of Science and Technology (KNUST) in Kumasi, Ghana. It is based at the Department of Civil Engineering in the College of Engineering and specialises in postgraduate programmes, professional development courses and applied research in water and sanitation.

The centre forms part of the Africa Centres of Excellence initiative, a World Bank-supported programme designed to strengthen postgraduate training, applied research and regional capacity in selected development fields. Its work covers water resources, climate change, water treatment and supply, waste management, environmental sanitation and water, sanitation and hygiene governance.

== History ==
RWESCK developed from earlier water and sanitation capacity-building work at KNUST. The centre traces its origins to the Water Supply and Environmental Sanitation Project, which began in 1996 with financial support from the Government of the Netherlands. The project was revised in 2004 and renamed the Water Resources and Environmental Sanitation Project.

In 2016, Graphic Online reported that the World Bank was providing US$8 million to support the establishment of the Regional Water and Environmental Sanitation Centre in Kumasi. The report stated that the centre was to be located on the KNUST campus and was expected to scale up research, training and capacity building for students and other stakeholders in the water and sanitation sectors.

A World Bank audited financial statement identifies RWESCK as an Africa Centres of Excellence project implemented by KNUST, with the International Development Association as project financier. The 2016 Graphic Online report also stated that the centre was a collaboration involving the centre, the World Bank and the Government of Ghana.

== Objectives and focus areas ==
RWESCK was established to support postgraduate training, research and capacity development in water and environmental sanitation. WASCAL describes the centre as a regional centre of excellence at the Department of Civil Engineering, College of Engineering, KNUST, specialising in postgraduate programmes at the MSc and PhD levels as well as professional development courses in water and sanitation.

The centre's focus areas include water resources, climate change, water treatment and supply, waste management, environmental sanitation and WASH governance. WASCAL lists its thematic areas as innovative water treatment technology, innovative water distribution and smart technology, environmental sanitation and waste management technology, climate resilience and water resources management, and water and sanitation governance.

RWESCK's official mission statement describes its purpose as providing an environment for teaching, research and mentorship training in water and sanitation science and technology for industrial and socio-economic development.

== Academic programmes ==
RWESCK offers postgraduate programmes through KNUST's Department of Civil Engineering. Its MSc programmes include Environmental Sanitation and Waste Management, Water Supply Engineering and Management, Water Engineering with a water resources focus, and Disaster Prevention and Management.

The centre also offers doctoral programmes in Water Supply and Treatment Technology, Water Resources Management, and Environmental Sanitation and Waste Management. Its doctoral programme structure includes coursework, proposal development, internship, research and thesis work.

Applications are open to candidates from Ghana and other African countries. The centre states that candidates from non-Anglophone countries must provide evidence of ability to communicate in English.

== Professional training and short courses ==
RWESCK runs professional short courses in water and sanitation. The centre describes its short-course methods as including lectures, group exercises, case-study analysis, hands-on sessions and field trips.

The listed courses include sustainable onsite sanitation and faecal sludge management, integrated municipal solid waste management, climate-resilient urban drainage, water and sanitation master planning, borehole drilling and construction, GIS applications in water resources management, drinking-water safety planning, advanced water treatment membrane technology, water instrumentation and automation, machine learning and artificial intelligence applications in water and sanitation management, and water and sanitation infrastructure governance.

In 2025, the NEPAD Water Centres of Excellence network reported that RWESCK hosted a delegation from Nigeria's National Water Resources Institute as part of collaboration linked to water resources management training. The report stated that the delegation visited RWESCK's water quality laboratories, hydraulic laboratories and water resources engineering laboratories.

== Research ==
RWESCK organises its research around water, sanitation and environmental systems. Its research groups include the Water Resources Research Group, Water Supply Research Group, Environmental Sanitation Research Group, and WASH Governance and Policy Research Group.

The Water Resources Research Group focuses on areas including climate change, integrated water resources management, transboundary basins, irrigation development, scientific computing and modelling. The Water Supply Research Group works on water treatment and water-supply service delivery in relation to the Sustainable Development Goals. The Environmental Sanitation Research Group covers environmental protection, environmental health, waste treatment, composting, nutrient recovery, bio-waste-to-energy and modelling of development impacts. The WASH Governance and Policy Research Group focuses on infrastructure development, financing, governance, settlement upgrading, women empowerment and behavioural-change communication.

The centre lists publications by affiliated researchers in areas such as water supply, sachet-water quality, rainwater harvesting, water services for the urban poor, small-town water service delivery, faecal sludge and latrine use, solid-waste services, groundwater, irrigation-water quality and hydrological modelling.

== Applied research and innovation ==
RWESCK has been involved in applied research on sanitation, wastewater treatment and resource recovery. In 2023, MyJoyOnline reported that RWESCK and Sewerage Systems Ghana Limited were using activated charcoal derived from faecal sludge to purify wastewater. The report stated that the work evaluated faecal sludge-derived activated charcoal for wastewater pollutant removal and that the results were published in Advances in Materials Science and Engineering.

The Africa Higher Education Centres of Excellence programme reported in 2024 that RWESCK had undertaken digital-skills development activities in artificial intelligence, machine learning, the Internet of Things, GIS data analytics and digital literacy for the water and sanitation sector. The same report stated that the centre was working with the Ghana Standards Authority toward ISO/IEC 17025:2017 certification for its laboratory facilities.

Another Africa Higher Education Centres of Excellence report described RWESCK projects in non-intrusive water-leakage detection and unmanned aerial vehicle surveillance of illegal mining. The report stated that the leakage-detection work involved passive acoustic sensing, machine learning and signal processing and was being developed with the Community Water and Sanitation Agency.

== Digital water and sanitation training ==
RWESCK has worked on digitalisation in the water and sanitation sector. In 2023, MyJoyOnline reported that RWESCK, in collaboration with AgroParisTech, had identified digital skills gaps in the application of digitalisation innovations and smart circular economy in water and sanitation utilities management.

The same report said RWESCK organised a national workshop on digital transformation skills development in the water and sanitation sector in Accra. It also reported that the Nyansapo Project, funded by the French Embassy in Ghana, was intended to introduce digital transformation skills into water and sanitation education for graduate training, research and internships.

== Conferences and sector engagement ==
RWESCK has participated in sector conferences and knowledge-exchange activities on climate change, water security and environmental sanitation. In 2017, Graphic Online reported that climate change and sanitation experts, together with early career scientists working in Africa, met in Accra to discuss research on water insecurity, climate change, flooding and sanitation issues affecting Ghana and other parts of the continent.

The report described the event as the first regional conference and school in West Africa dedicated to water, climate change and environmental sanitation. It stated that the event was jointly organised by KNUST, the Ghana Academy of Arts and Sciences and the World Bank. The thematic areas included climate change, climatic systems, resilient WASH systems, integrated water resources management, hydrology, hydrogeology, water security, vulnerability and early warning systems.

== Community outreach ==
RWESCK has also been involved in hygiene education and school-based WASH outreach. In 2023, MyJoyOnline reported on RWESCK's handwashing education activities in rural communities, including education for pupils on proper handwashing and the donation of tissue, liquid soap and handwashing stations to schools. The report named Ampabame, Odaho and Kwaso M/A primary schools among the schools reached by the activities.

== Laboratories and facilities ==
RWESCK has developed laboratory and teaching facilities to support research and postgraduate training. The centre states that one of its objectives is to build laboratory and lecture facilities for postgraduate education in water, environment and sanitation.

In 2024, the centre publicised laboratory characterisation services including X-ray diffraction analysis and scanning electron microscopy. The centre described the X-ray diffraction facility as a portable desktop instrument for powder diffraction applications, and the scanning electron microscope as a tool for morphology and elemental analysis across research and quality-control applications.

The NEPAD Water Centres of Excellence network reported in 2025 that a visiting delegation from Nigeria's National Water Resources Institute toured RWESCK facilities including water quality laboratories, hydraulic laboratories and water resources engineering laboratories.

== Partnerships ==
RWESCK works with academic, public-sector and industry partners. The centre lists regional academic partners including the National Water Resources Institute and the University of Benin in Nigeria, and Cheikh Anta Diop University in Senegal.

Its national partners include the Water Resources Commission, Ghana Water Company Limited, Community Water and Sanitation Agency, Ghana Irrigation Development Authority, CSIR Water Research Institute and the Environmental Protection Agency. WASCAL has also described RWESCK as having local academic and industrial partners as well as international relations with universities outside Ghana.

== Role in water and sanitation education ==
RWESCK is part of Ghana's water and sanitation education and research infrastructure. Its activities relate to drinking-water treatment, water resources management, faecal sludge management, municipal solid waste, urban drainage, water-safety planning, climate resilience and WASH governance.

The centre's regional role is connected to the need for trained engineers, researchers and practitioners who can work on water access, sanitation services, waste management, environmental health, climate-related water risks and governance of WASH infrastructure.
