= AvantGrand =

Brand of digital piano

AvantGrand is a brand of digital piano introduced by Yamaha in 2009. The product line consists of a baby grand piano (the N3, replaced by the N3X in 2016), two "vertical" grand pianos (the N2, and the N1 replaced by the N1X in 2019), and an upright piano (the NU1, replaced by the NU1X in 2017, replaced by the NU1XA in 2023).

The AvantGrand pianos use samples taken from four locations in a Yamaha CFIIIS (CFX and Bosendorfer Imperial for the N1X, N3X and for the NU1X, CFX for NU1) Concert Grand pianos and attempt to emulate all aspects of conventional piano sound and play, down to the tactile response of keys and pedals. In covering the piano's release, Slate editor Chris Wilson wrote that the AvantGrand piano represents a substantial functional improvement over the conventional piano, while sounding practically indistinguishable from one for 95% of the world's pianists.
