= N-2 =

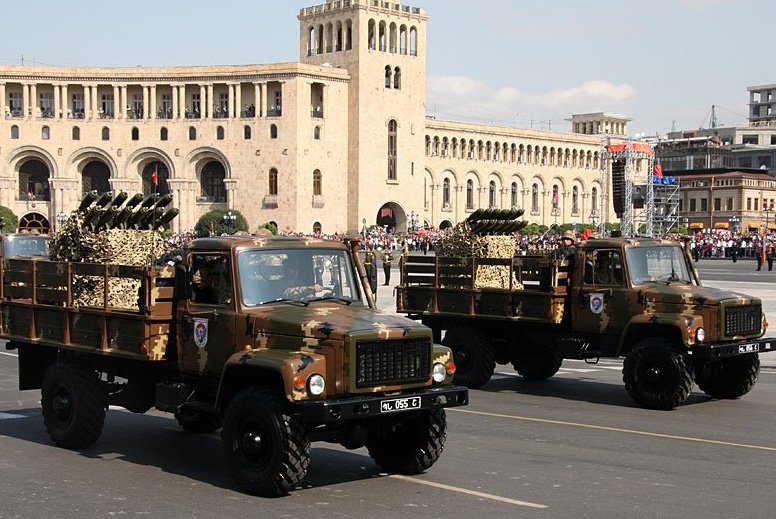
- Armenian N-2 systems on parade in Republic Square, Yerevan.
- Type: Multiple rocket launcher
- Place of origin: Armenia

Service history
- In service: 2011–Present
- Used by: Armenian Army; Nagorno-Karabakh Defense Army(Presumably)
- Wars: Armenian–Azerbaijani border conflict

Production history
- Designer: Garni-ler
- Manufacturer: Garni-ler
- Produced: 2011–Present
- No. built: Unknown

Specifications
- Crew: 3 (Assumed)
- Shell: TB-1/RPG-7
- Barrels: 12
- Rate of fire: Single/Salvo
- Maximum firing range: 1,300 Meters
- Engine: V8 Diesel 4.67 ZMZ-5231.10; 130 hp (100 kW)
- Suspension: 4x4 wheeled

The N-2 is an Armenian multiple rocket launcher designed and produced by the Scientific Production Association Garni-Ler starting no later than 2011. Armenia has not released much information regarding the rocket system, however it is apparent that the N-2 is being mass-produced, and is in active use by the Armenian Armed Forces, and likely the Nagorno-Karabakh Defense Army. The system was developed onto the GAZ-3308, a Russian military truck. The launcher is mainly used with Armenian TB-1 thermobaric missiles and RPG-7 grenades, but is designed to be compatible with a wide variety of ammunition from many different countries. The launcher, holding up to 12 rockets, is fired using a remote electrical panel, and can be fired in single shots or in a salvo for up to 10 seconds.
