= Nii Okwei Kinka Dowuona VI =

Ghanaian traditional ruler (1963–2021)

Osu Maŋtsɛ of Osu, Accra
- Reign: 2010 – 2021
- Coronation: 2010
- Born: Michael Nii Okwei Dowuona-Owoo; 7 November 1963; Adabraka, Accra, Ghana
- Died: 6 February 2021 (aged 57); Accra, Ghana
- House: Dowuona House
- Religion: Presbyterian
- Occupation: Banker; Software engineer; Commercial farmer; Paramount chief

Nii Okwei Kinka Dowuona VI (born Michael Nii Okwei Dowuona-Owoo, 7 November 1963 – 6 February 2021), was the Osu Maŋtsɛ or King of the Ga people of Osu in the Greater Accra Region of Ghana, West Africa. As the Paramount Chief of Osu, he was President of the Osu Traditional Council. He was elected President of the Greater Accra Regional House of Chiefs in 2016. He is reported by the Ghana's national daily newspaper, the Daily Graphic, to have died at dawn on Saturday 6 February 2021.

== Early life and career ==
Nii Okwei Kinka Dowuona VI was born at Adabraka, Accra, into the Dowuona royal family of Osu in 1963. He was born to Osu natives George Nii Noi Dowuona-Owoo and Grace Koshie Odarley Wellington. After completing his formal education at Swedru Secondary School in the Central Region of Ghana, he was recruited as a Banker and Computer Analyst by Société Générale - Social Security Bank (SG-SSB), later becoming a senior software programmer at the bank. He was also a commercial farmer, with extensive cocoa plantation holdings in the Enchi District of the Western Region of Ghana.

== Enstoolment as Osu Maŋtsɛ ==
Prior to his ascension to the Osu Stool (or throne), Nii Okwei Kinka Dowuona VI had served the Osu state in different capacities. He had been a member of the Kinkawe Asafo (warriors of Osu's Kinka Quarter), Secretary to the Dzaase (kingmakers) and also Secretary of the Osu Traditional Council. As a male member of the royal Dowuona House, one of the two Osu royal houses (the other being the Owuo House), Nii Okwei Kinka Dowuona VI was in line to be enstooled king during the protracted chieftaincy dispute that had wracked the Osu state for decades. His service to the traditional authority had brought him to the attention of the stool fathers and therefore stood him in good stead to leverage his lineage. In the interim, however, another claimant, Nii Nortey Owuo III (also known as David Nortey Ashong), had held himself out to be King of Osu for several years, tracing his lineage through the Owuo House, though he was unable to secure the support of key stakeholders regarding his eligibility. On 4 May 2007, the accredited Dzaase in collaboration with the Wulomo (chief priest) and the leadership of the two royal houses, successfully installed Nii Okwei Kinka Dowuona VI as substantive Maŋtsɛ or King at the Osu Klottey Shrine located in the confines of the Osu Castle. This state of affairs resulted in high drama that year when both Nii Nortey Owuo III and Nii Okwei Kinka Dowuona VI led rival processions to celebrate the Ga Homowo festival in August, though Nii Nortey Owuo had custody of the Osu Palace and received government functionaries and other traditional rulers in his capacity as Osu Maŋtsɛ. The recognition given by government officials to Nii Nortey Owuo III during the festival and other functions provoked angry reactions from the Osu Traditional Council, which insisted that it recognised Nii Okwei Kinka Dowuona VI and not Nii Nortey Owuo III as Osu Maŋtsɛ Both sides litigated the matter in the courts, and a decision by the High Court in Accra in March 2010 settled the dispute in favour of Nii Okwei Kinka Dowuona VI. Following this development, on May 2, 2010, the National House of Chiefs formally gazetted or entered the name of Nii Okwei Kinka Dowuona VI into the National Register of Chiefs as recognised Osu Maŋtsɛ . The National House of Chiefs also expunged from its records the name of Nii Nortey Owuo III as Osu Maŋtsɛ, revoking and withdrawing the document previously issued to him recognising him as Osu Maŋtsɛ, noting that as far back as 1992, the Government of Ghana had passed Executive Instrument (EI) 31 (Osu Stool Property (Seizure and Restoration) Instrument), which ordered the City Manager of Accra to take possession of the Osu Stool Property until a legitimate chief was enstooled. The House of Chiefs regarded EI 31 as effectively destooling Nii Nortey Owuo III. The Nii Nortey Owuo III faction continued to contest the enstoolment of Nii Okwei Kinka Dowuona VI, and when the latter was officially installed as Paramount Chief of Osu in May 2010, police had to fire rubber bullets to prevent the disruption of the event. However, Nii Okwei Kinka Dowuona VI subsequently exercised full substantive powers as Osu Maŋtsɛ, and was recognised by the Government of Ghana, politicians and traditional rulers in Ghana and abroad, as well as the public. His position as Paramount Chief of Osu made him the traditional landlord of the Government of Ghana and he was recognised as an authority on custom and tradition.

== Elevation to Paramountcy ==
Following a five-year enquiry, the Ghana National House of Chiefs on 27 April 2012 elevated the Osu Stool to Paramountcy status, five years into the reign of the new King. This brought Nii Okwei Kinka Dowuona VI greater prominence in the hierarchy of traditional authorities in Ghana, and gave the Osu Traditional Area a greater say in its affairs. Nii Okwei Kinka Dowuona VI was therefore inducted into the Greater Accra Regional House of Chiefs as Paramount Chief of Osu. The inclusion of the name “Kinka” in his stool name is a significant linkage to Kinka We (Kinka Quarter), where the two royal houses of Osu (Dowuona and Owuo) as well as the Dadebu Shrine are based. In historical times, the Dadebu (literally, "steel pit") was the vault dug in the ground for storing and concealing weapons used by the Asafo (warriors). In December 2016, Kinka Dowuona VI was elected President of the Greater Accra Regional House of Chiefs for a four-year term, making him the lead spokesperson for traditional rulers in the region.

== Development agenda ==
Nii Okwei Kinka Dowuona VI announced a bold development agenda on his enstoolment. Osu lands encompass prime real estate in national capital of Accra, and the King has sought co-investments to leverage state assets in favour of his people. He launched the Osu Maŋtsɛ Community Development Initiative (OMANCODI), a community-based initiative aimed at supporting the national government in the socio-economic improvement of the Osu state. The areas of focus for this program were Health, Education, Agriculture, and Real Estate Development. In 2012, he was awarded a Certificate of Excellence for his dedication to the development of his traditional area by the Elders Forum of the Distinguished Scholars of Africa. He was an advocate for a stronger, non-partisan role for traditional rulers in national governance.

== Personal life ==
Nii Okwei Kinka Dowuona VI was married and has six children: Grace Naa Shormeh Dowuona-Owoo, George Nii Noi Dowuona-Owoo, Richard Nii Narku Dowuona-Owoo, Naa Shormeh Dowuona-Owoo, Michelle Naa Shormeh Dowuona-Owoo and Naa Korlei Dowuona-Owoo.

== Death ==
He died on 6 February 2021.
