= Nii Addy =

American neuroscientist

Nii Antie Addy
- Education: Duke University (BA); Yale University (PhD)
- Scientific career
- Workplaces: Yale School of Medicine
- Thesis: Role of calcineurin in nicotine-mediated behavior and signaling (2007)

Nii Addy is an African-American neuroscientist who is an Associate Professor of Psychiatry at the Yale School of Medicine. His research considers the neurobiological basis of substance use disorders, depression, and anxiety. He has worked on various initiatives to mitigate tobacco use and addiction.

== Early life and education ==
Addy's parents were born in Accra Ghana and his father was a psychiatrist. Biology had always been Addy's passion and he describes how making the choice of biology or psychology in his undergrad. He chose biology to study in part due to a recommendation from his psychiatry professor at the time. This was the origin of his interest in neuroscience. Addy graduated from East Grand Rapid's High School in 1996. He then earned his bachelor's degree at Duke University in 2000 for Biology. He moved to Yale University for his doctoral studies, and he graduated in 2007 with a doctorate in Neuroscience.In addition, he completed a postdoctoral appointment in analytical chemistry at University of North Carolina at Chapel Hill.

== Research and career ==
After earning his doctoral degree Addy was appointed to the faculty at the Yale School of Medicine. At Yale School of Medicine, Addy leads a laboratory investigating the mechanisms of reinforcement learning and motivational control.He currently leads a lab in the Yale School of Medicine called the Addy Lab. He also currently serves as the school's Director of Faculty Development and Collaborative Excellence. He has investigated the impact of vaping on teenager's brains. During the Covid-19 pandemic, Addy started a podcast called The Addy Hour. He brings a variety of people in different professions to talk about different topics. Addy published work which suggests that early-life exposure to non-nutritive sugar enhances nicotine preference, which could have implications in regulatory policies for tobacco products. Additionally, in 2020, Addy became a Scientific Council Member for the Brain & Behavior Research Foundation. He is a member of the editorial boards of Neuropsychopharmacology, Biological Psychiatry, and Neuropharmacology. In the past, he also reviewed grants for the Neurobiology of Motivated Behavior (NMB) Study Section at the National Institutes of Health’s Center for Scientific Review.Addy mentored neuroscientist Angeline Dukes and praised her leadership in developing Black In Neuro, a community supporting Black researchers in neuroscience. Addy is also a member of the Board of Trustees for The Carver Project, which aims to bridge the gap between university and church.

== Selected publications ==
- Levin, Edward D; Addy, Nii; Nakajima, Aya; Christopher, N.Channelle; Seidler, Frederic J; Slotkin, Theodore A (2001). "Persistent behavioral consequences of neonatal chlorpyrifos exposure in rats". Developmental Brain Research. 130 (1): 83–89. doi:10.1016/s0165-3806(01)00215-2. ISSN 0165-3806. PMID 11557096.
- Addy, Nii A; Nakijama, Aya; Levin, Edward D (2003). "Nicotinic mechanisms of memory: effects of acute local DHβE and MLA infusions in the basolateral amygdala". Cognitive Brain Research. 16 (1): 51–57. doi:10.1016/s0926-6410(02)00209-4. ISSN 0926-6410. PMID 12589888.
- Picciotto, Marina R.; Addy, Nii A.; Mineur, Yann S.; Brunzell, Darlene H. (2008-04-01). "It is not "either/or": Activation and desensitization of nicotinic acetylcholine receptors both contribute to behaviors related to nicotine addiction and mood". Progress in Neurobiology. 84 (4): 329–342. doi:10.1016/j.pneurobio.2007.12.005. ISSN 0301-0082. PMC 2390914. PMID 18242816.
- Addy, N.A.; Nunes, E.J.; Hughley, S.M. (2018). "The L-type calcium channel blocker, isradipine, attenuates cue-induced cocaine-seeking by enhancing dopaminergic activity in the ventral tegmental area to nucleus accumbens pathway". Neuropsychopharmacol. 43 (12): 2361–2372. doi:10.1038/s41386-018-0080-2. PMC 6180103. PMID 29773910.
