= Nii Amugi II =

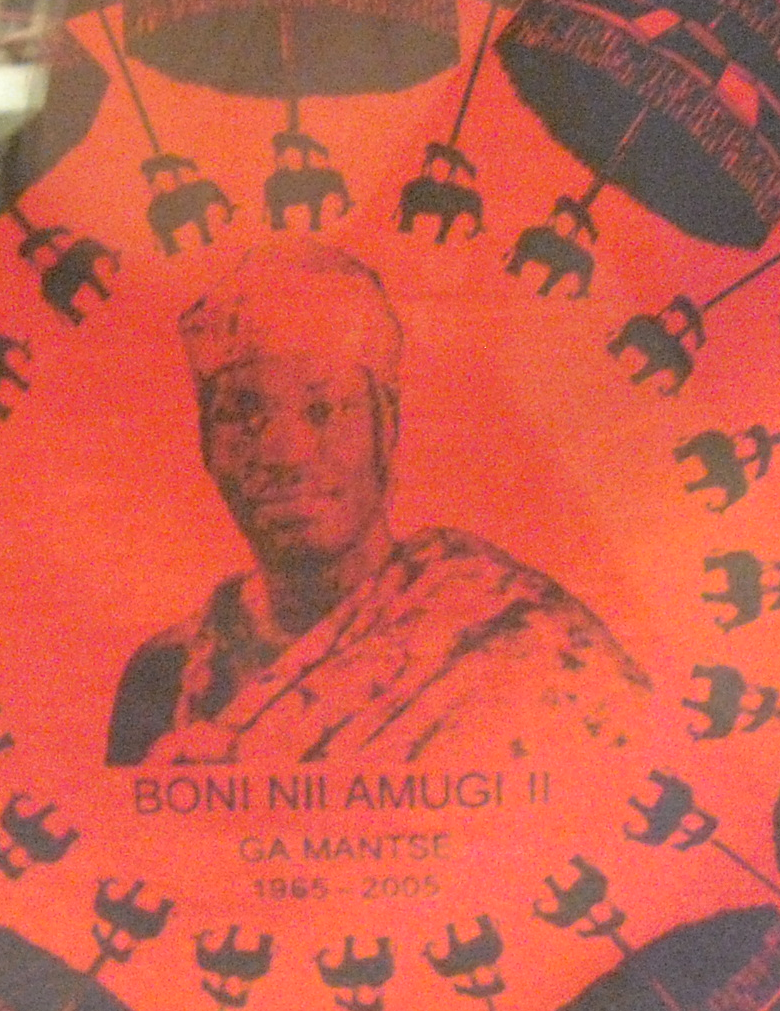
A commemorative cloth of Nii Amugi II in the British Museum, London, UK.

Nii Amugi II is the official title of Simon Nii Yarboi Yartey (8 June 1940 – 10 December 2004), who was the Ga Mantse in Ga for 39 years.

== Biography ==
Amugi was the sixth child of his father Samuel Nii Ofoli Yartey and the second of mother, Elizabeth Naa Afi Torgbor of Amugi We and Sakumo Tsoshishi respectively. As a student in 1946, he attended Methodist primary school at Kojokrom in the Western Region of Ghana, continuing at Nsawam ECM. He had 8 children, with wife Josephine Yartey.

== Death ==
Nii Amugi II died after a long struggle with ill health. His funeral was attended by former president of Ghana, Jerry John Rawlings, as well as Professor John Atta-Mills, the NDC Presidential candidate for the 2008 general elections, Mr. Edward Doe Adjaho, Deputy Minority leader and Dr. Mary Grant.
