= Gã Mantse =

Royal title in Ghana

Gã Mantse is the title of the Ghanaian king of the Gã State in southern Ghana, where the Ga-Adangbe people dwell. Accra is its capital city. The Ga-Dangbe, Gã-Daŋbɛ, Ga-Dangme, or GaDangme are an ethnic group in Ghana, Togo and Benin. The current Ga Mantse is King Tackie Teiko Tsuru II. He is also known as Kelvin Nii Tackie Abia. He is an entrepreneur. He was sworn in by the Ga Paramount Stool Dzasetse (Principal Kingmaker) Nii Tetteh Kwei II, a host of Dzasefoi (Kingmakers) and other traditional leaders as per customary and traditional demands. The Gã Mantse has in recent times become popular for his contribution to Ga literature or language by popularising the term Oobak3 which means welcome in Gã.

== Ashanti King visit ==
On 9 June 2024 the Asantehene, Otumfuo Nana Osei Tutu II, visited the King of Ga-Mashie State, Ga Mantse, Nii Tackie Teiko Tsuru II, at the Ga Mantse Palace in Accra. The visit was part of activities commemorating a historic visit by the King of Asante. This marks the second visit by an Asante monarch; the first visit occurred in 1946. The event comes after Ga Mantse recently attended the 25th-anniversary celebration of Otumfuo Osei Tutu II's ascension to the throne and his 74th birthday celebration. The Asantehene emphasized the imperative for the Ga and Ashanti peoples to unite in advancing their communities. He urged all Ga chiefs to rally behind Nii Teiko Tsuru II, highlighting that unity and development should be their primary goals for the betterment of future generations. Otumfuo also contributed GH¢500,000.00 to the Ga Education Fund.

The Ga Mantse expressed gratitude to Otumfuo for honoring his invitation and called for unity among the chiefs in the Ga State.

== See also ==
- List of rulers of Gã
