= List of people from Accra =

This is a list of notable people who were born or have lived in Accra, Ghana.

== Born in Accra ==
=== 1901–1970 ===
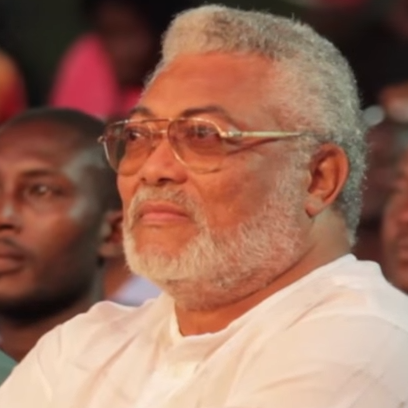
Jerry Rawlings (born 1947)

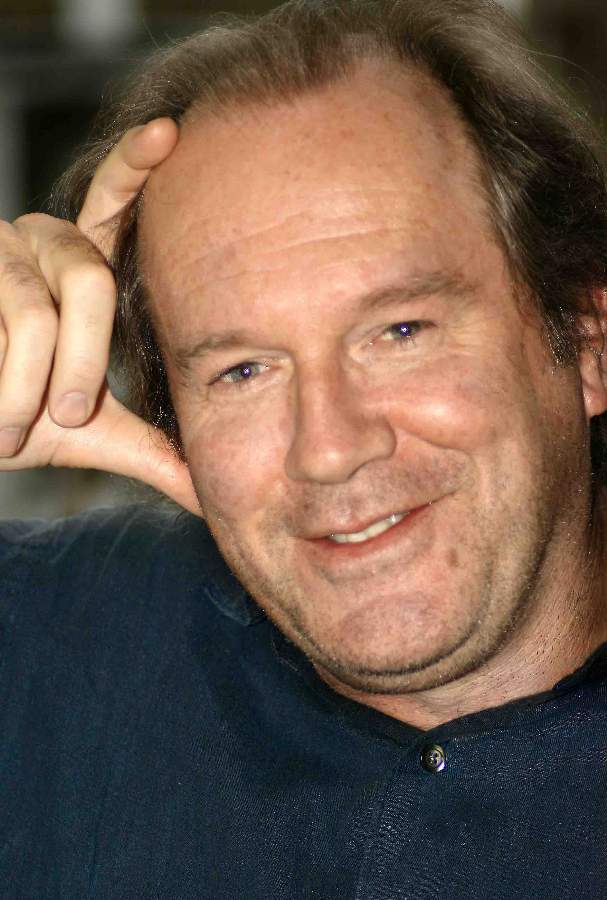
William Boyd (born 1952)

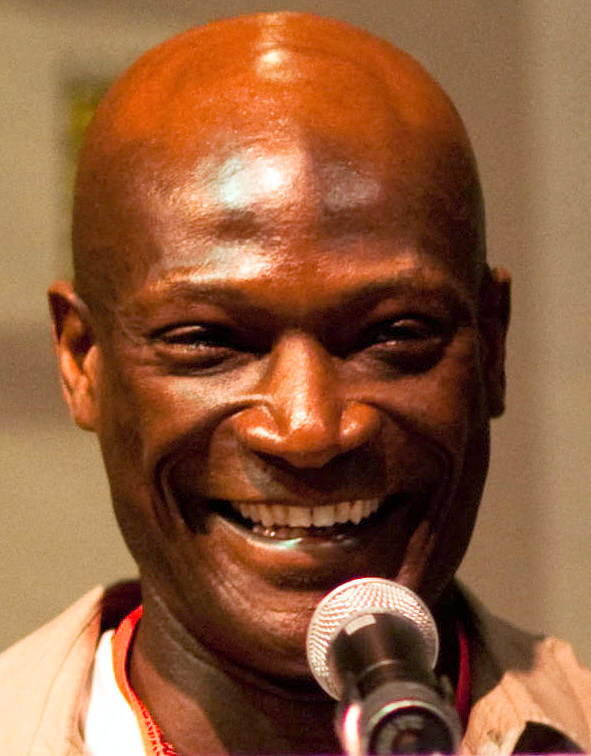
Peter Mensah (born 1959)

- Gottlieb Ababio Adom (1904–1979), educator, journalist, editor and Presbyterian clergyman
- Mabel Dove Danquah (1905–1984), journalist, political activist, and creative writer
- Joseph Arthur Ankrah (1915–1992), 2nd President of Ghana
- Saka Acquaye (1923–2007), musician, playwright, artist
- Guy Warren (1923–2008), musician
- James Barnor (born 1929), photographer
- Peter Ala Adjetey (1931–2008), Speaker of the Parliament of Ghana from 2001 to 2005
- Love Allotey (1936–1996), boxer
- Eddie Blay (1937–2006), boxer
- Floyd Robertson (1937–1983), boxer
- Clement Quartey (born 1938), boxer
- Fred Aryee (born 1939), Nigerian footballer
- Mustapha Tettey Addy (born 1942), master drummer
- Nana Akufo-Addo (born 1944), President of Ghana
- Margaret Busby (born 1944), publisher, editor and writer
- Oliver Acquah (born 1946), footballer
- Jerry Rawlings (born 1947–2020), President of Ghana from 1993 to 2001
- Souad Faress (born 1948), stage, radio, television and film actress.
- David Kotei (born 1950), boxer
- William Boyd (born 1952), Scottish novelist, short story writer and screenwriter
- Abena Busia (born 1953), writer, poet, lecturer and diplomat
- Hugh Quarshie (born 1954), actor
- Robert Bathurst (born 1957), English actor
- Azumah Nelson (born 1958), boxer
- Abdul–Aziz Yakubu (born 1958), mathematician
- Peter Mensah (born 1959), Ghanaian-British actor
- Mike Tetteh (born 1960), businessman, professional boxing promoter
- Nana (born 1968), German rapper and DJ
- Marcel Desailly (born 1968), French footballer
- Ali Ibrahim Pelé (born 1969), footballer
- Ike Quartey (born 1969), boxer

=== 1971–1980 ===
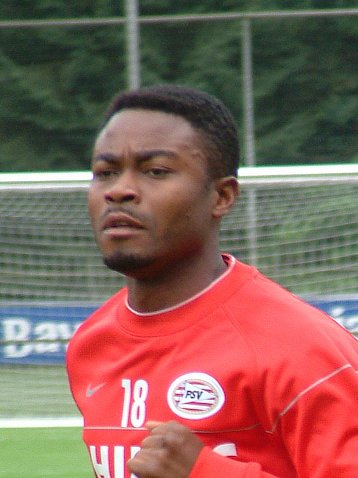
Eric Addo (born 1978)

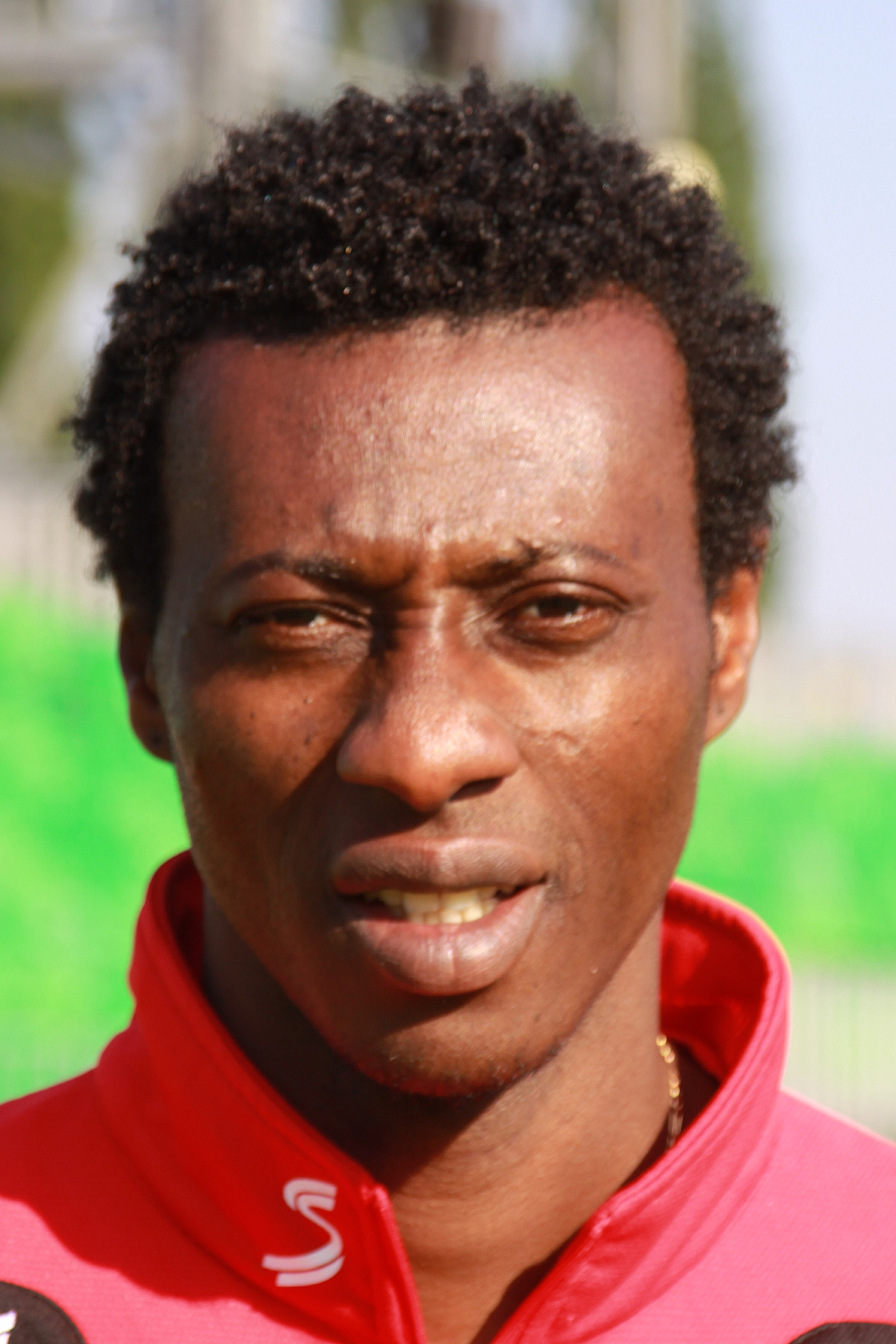
Éric Akoto (born 1980)

- Joe Addo (born 1971), footballer
- Komla Dumor (1972–2014), journalist
- Bernard Aryee (born 1973), football player
- Kwame Ayew (born 1973), footballer
- Eben Dugbatey (born 1973), football defender
- Samuel Johnson (born 1973), footballer
- Ohene Kennedy (born 1973), footballer
- Leonard Myles-Mills (born 1973), athlete
- Alex Nyarko (born 1973), footballer
- Joachim Yaw (born 1973), footballer
- Augustine Ahinful (born 1974), footballer
- Charles Akonnor (born 1974), footballer
- Joseph Aziz (born 1974), footballer
- Kofi Amoah Prah (born 1974), German long jumper
- Yaw Preko (born 1974), footballer
- Finley Quaye (born 1974), musician
- Godfried Aduobe (born 1975), footballer
- Charles Amoah (born 1975), footballer
- Daniel Addo (born 1976), footballer
- Emmanuel Osei Kuffour (born 1976), footballer
- Aziz Zakari (born 1976), athlete
- Owusu Benson (born 1977), football player
- Joshua Clottey (born 1977), boxer
- Kobna Holdbrook-Smith (born 1977), actor
- Eric Addo (born 1978), footballer
- Patrick Allotey (1978–2007), footballer
- Richard Kingson (born 1978), football goalkeeper
- Isaac Kwakye (born 1978), football attacking midfielder
- Christian Saba (born 1978), footballer
- Lawrence Adjei (born 1979), footballer
- Junior Agogo (born 1979), footballer
- Osumanu Adama (born 1980), boxer
- Sammy Adjei (born 1980), footballer
- Joseph Agbeko (born 1980), boxer
- Eric Akoto (born 1980), Togolese footballer
- Stephen Appiah (born 1980), footballer
- Baffour Gyan (born 1980), footballer
- Elvis Hammond (born 1980), footballer
- Abdullah Quaye (born 1980), footballer
- Vishal Punjabi (born 1980), Indian film producer and director

=== 1981–1990 ===
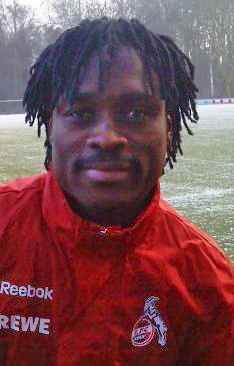
Derek Boateng (born 1983)

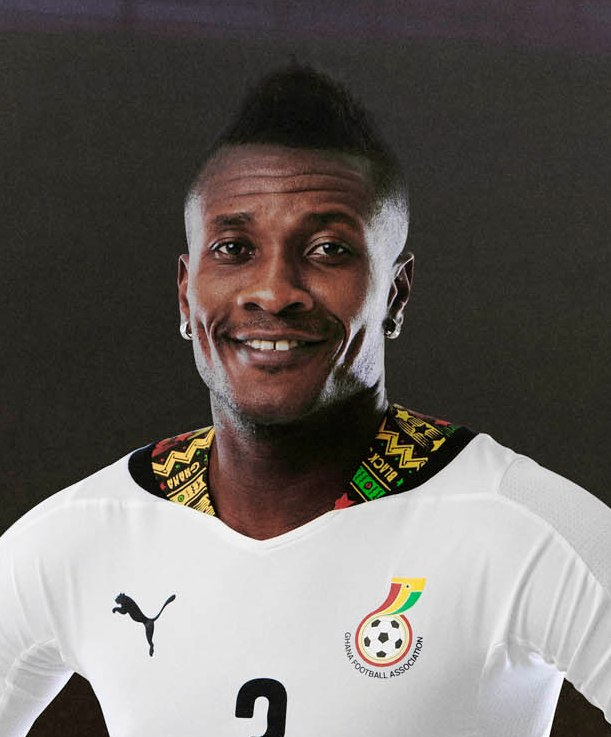
Asamoah Gyan (born 1985)

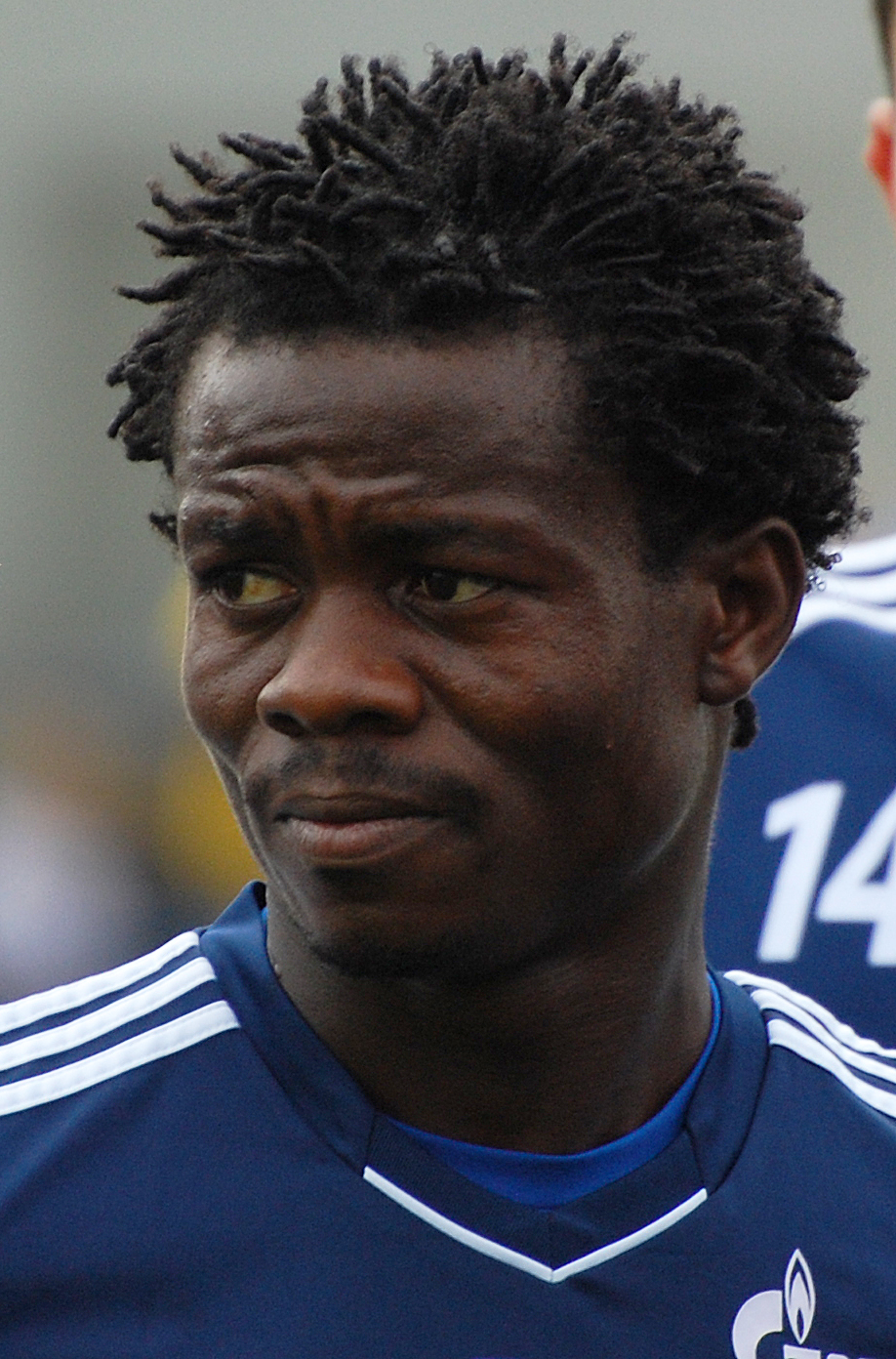
Anthony Annan (born 1986)

- Riga Mustapha (born 1981), Dutch footballer
- Emmanuel Pappoe (born 1981), footballer
- Ishmael Addo (born 1982), football striker
- Lawrence Aidoo (born 1982), footballer
- Michael Essien (born 1982), footballer
- Anthony Obodai (born 1982), footballer
- Daniel Ola (born 1982), Ghanaian-Nigerian footballer
- George Owu (born 1982), footballer
- Razak Pimpong (born 1982), footballer
- Ahkan (born 1983), musician and songwriter
- Vida Anim (born 1983), sprinter
- Derek Boateng (born 1983), footballer
- Yussif Chibsah (born 1983), footballer
- Ahmed Barusso (born 1984), footballer
- Ibrahim Abdul Razak (born 1983), footballer
- Fred Benson (born 1984), Dutch-Ghanaian footballer
- Lawrence Quaye (born 1984), Qatari footballer
- Charles Takyi (born 1984), footballer
- Ruky Abdulai (born 1985), Canadian long jumper and heptathlete
- Abdul Razak Alhassan (born 1985), mixed martial artist
- Asamoah Gyan (born 1985), footballer
- Bennard Yao Kumordzi (born 1985), footballer
- Anthony Annan (born 1986), footballer
- Mohammed-Awal Issah (born 1986), footballer
- Prince Tagoe (born 1986), footballer
- Alexander Tettey (born 1986), Norwegian footballer
- Samuel Yeboah (born 1986), footballer
- Mark Adu Amofah (born 1987), footballer
- John Boye (born 1987), footballer
- Emmanuel Clottey (born 1987), footballer
- Brimah Razak (born 1987), footballer
- Ibrahim Sulemana (born 1987), footballer
- Jerry Akaminko (born 1988), footballer
- Kwadwo Asamoah (born 1988), footballer
- Mohamed Awal (born 1988), footballer
- Cofie Bekoe (born 1988), footballer
- Davidson Eden (born 1988), German-Ghanaian footballer
- Ernest Sowah (born 1988), footballer
- Isaac Vorsah (born 1988), footballer
- Dominic Adiyiah (born 1989), footballer
- Mohammed Rabiu (born 1989), footballer
- Seidu Yahaya (born 1989), footballer
- David Accam (born 1990), footballer
- Lee Addy (born 1990), footballer
- Kalif Alhassan (born 1990), footballer
- Jonathan Mensah (born 1990), footballer
- Daniel Opare (born 1990), footballer

=== 1991–Present ===
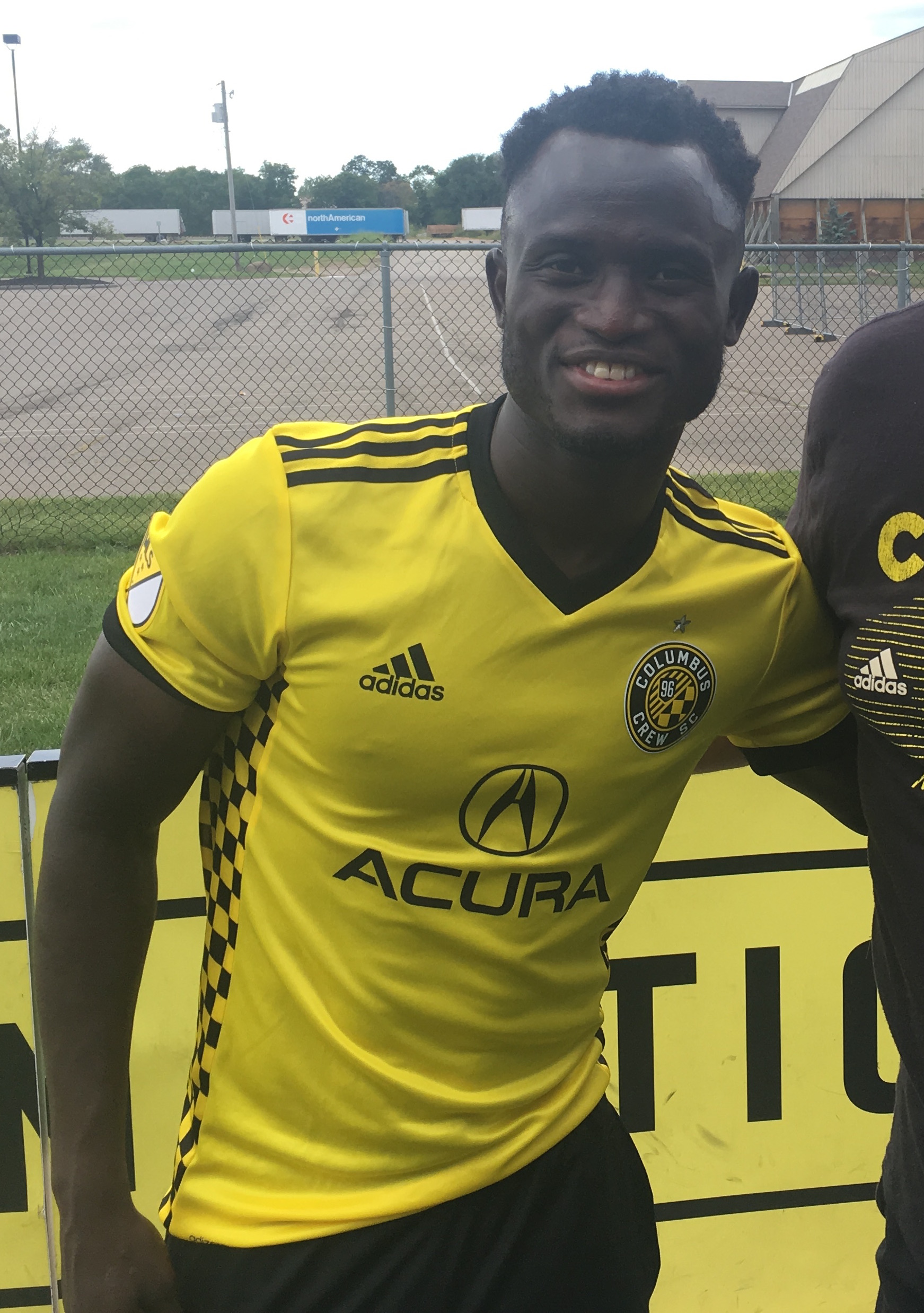
Mohammed Abu (born 1991)

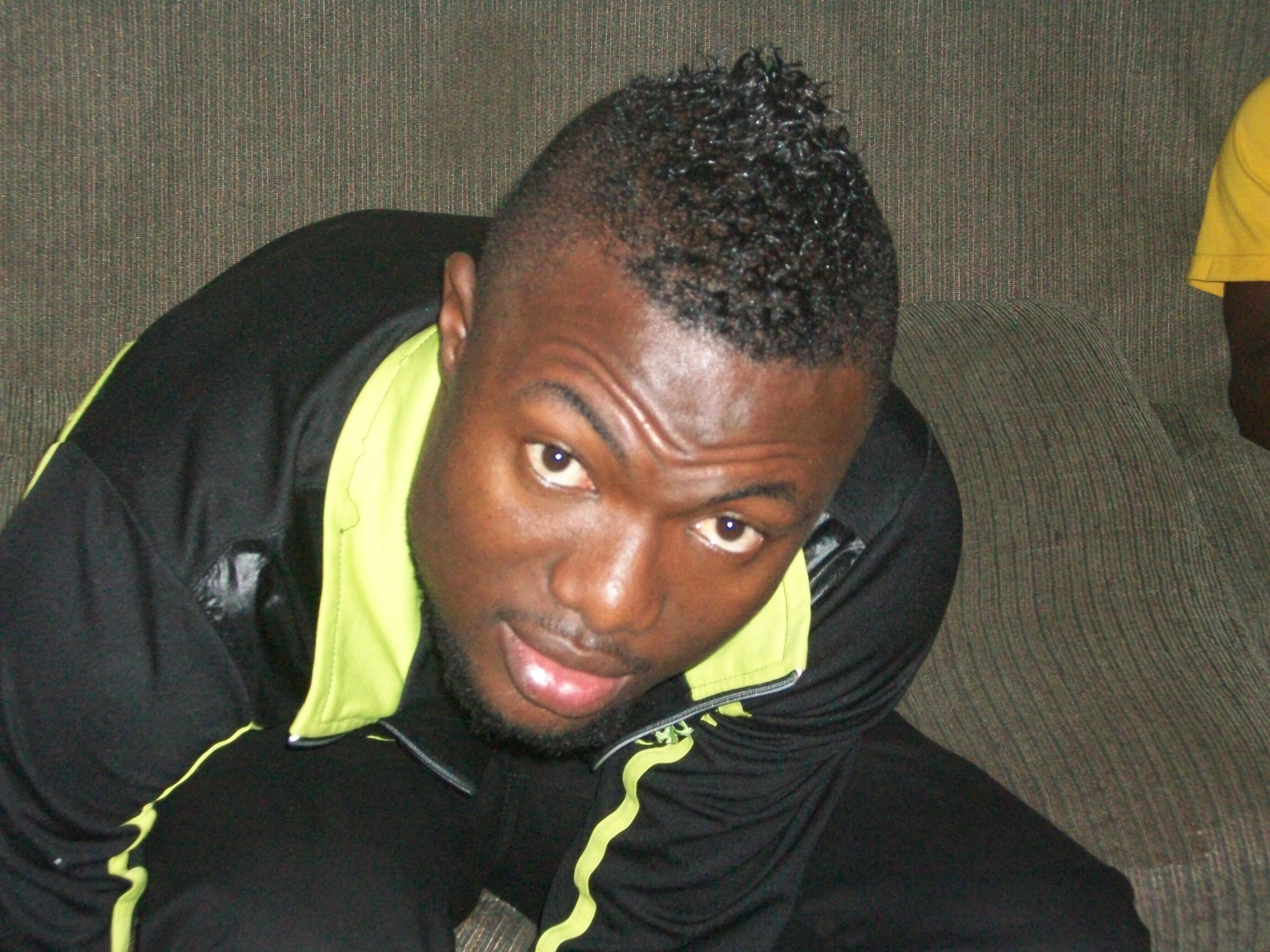
Gideon Baah (born 1991)

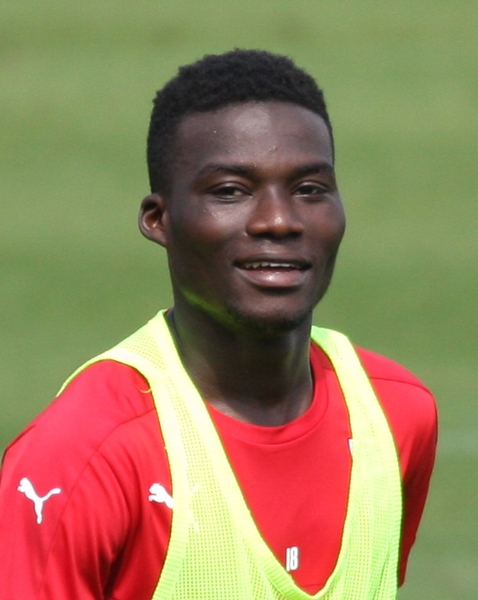
Hans Nunoo Sarpei (born 1998)

- Mohammed Abu (born 1991), footballer
- Gideon Baah (born 1991), footballer
- Jamin Beats (born 1991), Afro pop singer, producer, song writer
- Daniel Kofi Agyei (born 1992), footballer
- Mohammed Fatau (born 1992), footballer
- Mahatma Otoo (born 1992), footballer
- Frank Acheampong (born 1993), footballer
- Ebenezer Assifuah (born 1993), footballer
- Joshua Buatsi (born 1993), British boxer
- Raman Chibsah (born 1993), footballer
- Alfred Duncan (born 1993), footballer
- Nadia Eke (born 1993), triple jumper
- Ibrahim Moro (born 1993), footballer
- Daniel Amartey (born 1994), footballer
- Eugene Ansah (born 1994), footballer
- Emmanuel Boateng (born 1994), footballer>
- Joseph Larweh Attamah (born 1994), footballer
- Isaac Dogboe (born 1994), boxer
- Bernard Mensah (born 1994), footballer
- Clifford Aboagye (born 1995), footballer
- Bernard Kyere (born 1995), footballer
- Wahab Ackwei (born 1996), footballer
- Thomas Agyepong (born 1996), footballer
- Godfred Donsah (born 1996), footballer
- Lumor Agbenyenu (born 1996), footballer
- William Opoku (born 1997), footballer
- Benjamin Tetteh (born 1997), footballer
- Gifty Ayew Asare (born 1998), footballer
- Nathan Mensah (born 1998), basketball center for Maccabi Tel Aviv
- Joseph Paintsil (born 1998), footballer
- Hans Nunoo Sarpei (born 1998), footballer
- Francis Amuzu (born 1999), Belgian footballer
- Halutie Hor (born 1999), sprinter
- Abdul Nurudeen (born 1999), footballer
- Roberto Massimo (born 2000), German footballer
- Najeeb Yakubu (born 2000), footballer

== Lived in Accra ==
- Stephen Adei (born 1948), educationist, writer, economist and motivational speaker
- Zanetor Agyeman-Rawlings (born 1978), the eldest daughter of the 1st President under the 4th Republic of Ghana Jerry Rawlings
