= Amofah =

Amofah is an Ashanti surname found among the Akan people of Ghana and also – among others – the Akan diaspora in the Americas. Notable people with the surname include:

- Desmond Amofah (1990–2019), American YouTuber and streamer, better known as Etika
- Mark Adu Amofah (born 1987), Ghanaian-born footballer
- Samuel Amofa (born 1999), Ghanaian footballer
- Owuraku Amofah (born 1956), Ghanaian politician

== See also ==
- Akan names
