= Jamin Beats =

- Also known as: Jamin Beats
- Born: Francis Odartey Lamptey; October 16, 1991 (age 35); Accra, Ghana
- Genres: Afro pop, highlife, hiplife, hip hop
- Occupations: Singer, producer, songwriter
- Years active: 2002–present
- Labels: JamCity and ShellShock Records

Francis Odartey Lamptey (born October 16, 1991), known by the stage name Jamin Beats, is a Ghanaian Afro pop singer, producer and songwriter based in Maplewood, New Jersey. He won the US-based Uncovered Artist of the Year at the 2020 Ghana Music Awards USA.

== Early life and career ==
Jamin Beats hails from Nleshi James Town, a suburb of Accra. He had his senior high school education at Adisadel College, Cape Coast. He then proceeded to the Wisconsin International University College for his tertiary education. He started music in 2002, but took a break in order to focus on music production, upon his return he released single "Me Twi" in 2016.

== Discography ==
=== Album ===
- Dreams to Success 2018

=== Major singles ===
- Me Twi 2016
- Dutty Wine 2018
- Sugar Mama 2018
- Lies 2018
- Survivor (Breast Cancer) 2017
- Bumper 2018
- Give Me Your Love 2018
- Tonight 2018
- Love You More 2018
- Fire featuring Gemini Orleans 2018
- Long Tin 2019
- Another Man 2020
- Nana Nyame featuring Nana NYC 2021
- Makoma 2021

== Awards ==
Year	Award	Body	Result
2020	US-based Uncovered Artist of the Year	Ghana Music Awards-USA	Won
2021	US-Based Afropop Artist of the Year	Ghana Music Awards - USA	Won
2021	US-Based Artist of the Year	Ghana Music Awards - USA	Nominated
2021	US-Based Producer/Sound Engineer of the Year	Ghana Music Awards - USA	Won
2021	US-Based Best Male Vocalist of the Year	Ghana Music Awards - USA	Nominated
2021	US-Based Music Video of the Year (‘Another Man’ )	Ghana Music Awards - USA	Nominated
