= Mike Tetteh =

- Born: Michael Leviticus Attoh Tetteh; January 24, 1960 (age 66); Accra, Ghana
- Other name: the Don King of Ghana
- Occupation: Boxing promoter

Mike Tetteh (born January 24, 1960, Accra, Ghana, Africa) is an African businessman, professional boxing promoter. Tetteh formed Goldenmike Promotions (in relation to Golden Boy Promotions) in July 2003, and has promoted 34 amateur and professional boxing shows in Africa to date. Tetteh was named 'Boxing Promoter of the Year' in Ghana in 2010 and 2011.

== Fighters and events ==
Professional boxers in Tetteh's Goldenmike Promotions stable include: 26-0 cruiserweight contender Bukom Bantu (Braimah Kamoko), light middleweight Joshua Okine, lightweight Samuel Amoako, featherweight Ishmael Aryeetey, super middleweight Bastie Samir, light middleweight Issah Samir, super middleweight Charles Adamu, light welterweight Isaac Quartey, middleweight Ishmael Tetteh, lightweight Bilal Mohammad, and light welterweight Prince Doku Jr. At Tetteh's most recent boxing promotion in May 2013 at Accra Sports Stadium, 26-0 world ranked cruiserweight contender Bukom Bantu (also called Braimah Kamoko), a Tetteh fighter who holds the World Boxing Organization African title, stopped challenger George Tevdorashvili in the sixth round of the main event. With the win, Kamoko is ranked fifth in the world at cruiserweight by the WBO.
