= French Institute of Ghana =

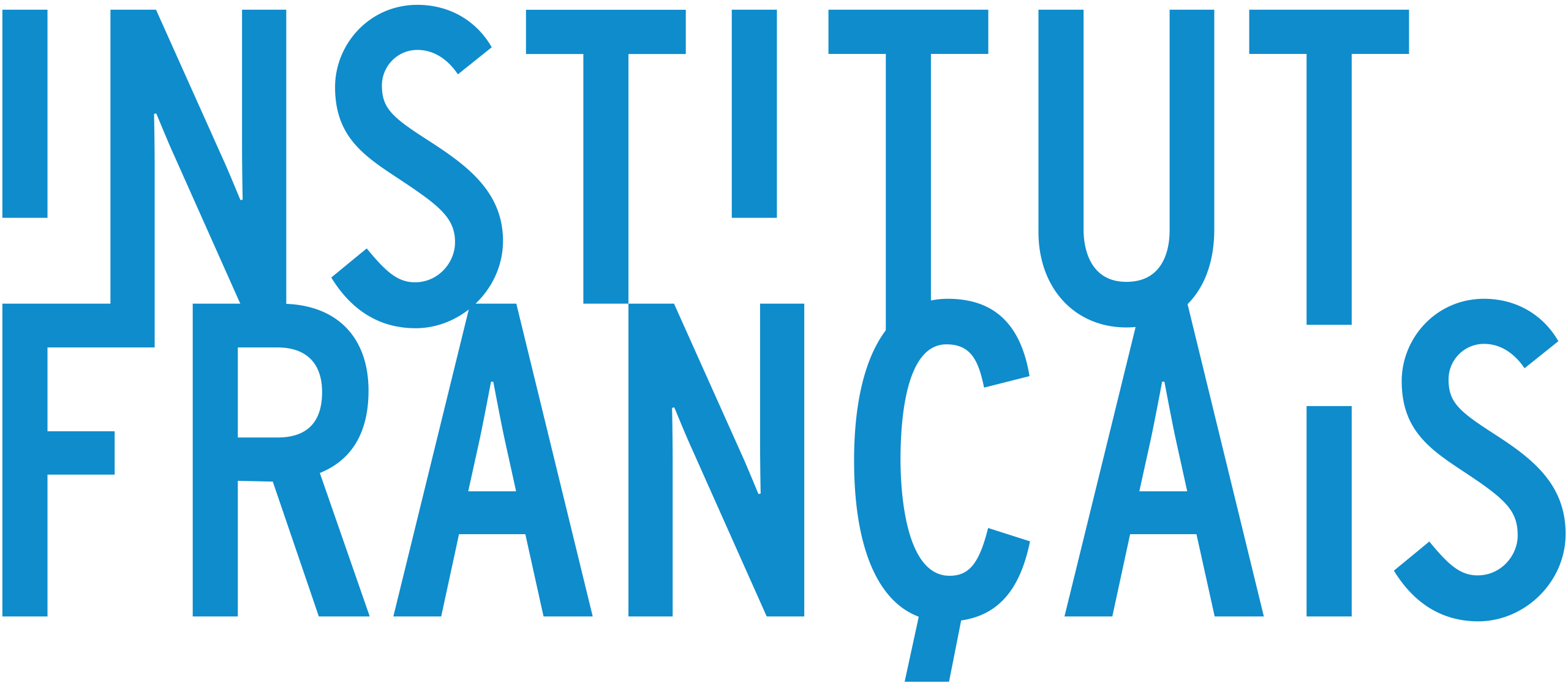
- Logo de l'Institut français (global)
- Formation: 2011
- Type: French cultural establishment
- Headquarters: 4th Circular Road Cantonments, Accra P.O. BOX 187, Accra
- Affiliations: Institut français

The French Institute of Ghana is part of the global network of French institutes. Its sole office is based in Accra, the country's capital, housed within the French Embassy in Ghana.

== History ==
The French Institute of Ghana was established on November 3, 2011, under the authority of the then executive president of the Institut français, Xavier Darcos, as part of a global reform of the cultural and cooperation network of the French Ministry of Foreign Affairs initiated by the law of 27 July 2010, replacing the French cultural activities that were previously under the association Culturesfrance.

This reorganization provided better unity and simplified management. The university, educational, linguistic, and cultural cooperation services of the French Embassy merged to form the French Institute of Ghana. They maintain close ties with the Consulate General, the office of the Alliance Française, and the administrative and academic authorities of the country.

== Role ==
The institute offers various cultural activities, as well as French language courses and classes.

In Ghana, an Anglophone country surrounded by Francophone countries, learning French and certifying learners are significant activities of the institute.

It collaborates with the Cooperation and Cultural Action Service (SCAC) of the French Embassy in Ghana to implement bilateral cooperation actions and programs between France and Ghana with its dual missions: "Supporting the modernization of Ghanaian society and strengthening the Francophonie".

Thus, the institute is particularly active in higher education, research and scientific exchanges (between France, Francophone countries, and Ghana), idea debates and knowledge promotion, teaching, cultural industries, and artistic exchanges.
