= Vishal Punjabi =

Ghanaian-Indian film director

- Born: 10 July 1980 (age 46); Accra, Greater Accra, Ghana
- Occupations: Film director, producer, screenwriter
- Title: CEO of The Wedding Filmer Company Limited
- Website: theweddingfilmer.co.in

Vishal Punjabi (born 10 July 1980) is a Ghanaian-born Indian film director and producer who predominantly works in Bollywood and Hindi cinema. Punjabi is the chief executive officer (CEO) of Mumbai film production company, The Wedding Filmer. In 2013, Vishal Punjabi's documentary film Heartbeats became India’s first wedding film to enter an international film festival.

== Biography ==
Born in an Indian family in Accra, Greater Accra, and ten years after Punjabi being born in Ghana, Vishal Punjabi migrated to England to continue his education in IT, Drama, Filmmaking and Business. After dabbling in the dot com boom at the turn of the 21st century, Punjabi shifted careers to join Red Chillies Entertainment as a line producer. While working on his second feature film Main Hoon Na, his knack for visual art was picked up by his film bosses. Punjabi was allowed to set up a team for Visual Art by putting together visual effects productions for Bollywood films like Aśoka, Main Hoon Na, Paheli, Don and Honeymoon Travels Pvt. Ltd.. Punjabi then moved into the advertising division within Red Chillies Entertainment to produce and direct television commercials for clients and products like Hero Honda, Pepsi, Hyundai, ITC Foods, Wipro, Videocon, Emami Group and ICICI Bank, to name a few. Punjabi, the young film producer and visual artist has also worked with agencies like FCB/ULKA, J. Walter Thompson, Saatchi & Saatchi, Ambience, and more.

== Filmography ==
=== Feature films ===
Vishal Punjabi's feature films include:

- Aśoka (2001)
- Main Hoon Na (2004)
- Paheli (2005)
- Don (2006)
- Honeymoon Travels Pvt. Ltd. (2007)

Vishal Punjabi also directed the wedding documentary Heartbeats in which was nominated for four indie film festivals including the D.I.Y Film Festival. Heartbeats is India’s first wedding film to enter an international film festival.
