= Mark Adu Amofah =

Ghanaian-born footballer

Personal information
- Full name: Mark Adu Amofah
- Date of birth: 7 July 1987 (age 39)
- Place of birth: Accra, Ghana
- Height: 1.70 m (5 ft 7 in)
- Position: Striker

Youth career
- Young Brazilians
- Fauzan F.C.

Senior career*
Years	Team	Apps	(Gls)
1999	Young Brazilians (Colts)		(0)
2001	Fauzan F.C.		
2002	Liberty Professionals	18	(8)
2005– Loan	Real Sportive	15	(10)
2006	Asante Kotoko SC	29	(21)
2008	Bloemfontein Celtic	19	(7)
2009	SønderjyskE	8	(3)
2010	Beitar Ramla	38	(14)
2011	Liberty Professionals	9	(4)
2012	Phattalung F.C.	18	(12)
2014–	Sitra Club		

International career^{‡}
2006	Ghana U20	15	(7)
2007	Ghana U23	5	(2)
- * Club domestic league appearances and goals as of 7 August 2000 ‡ National team caps and goals as of 7 August 2007

Mark Amofah (born 7 July 1987) is a Ghanaian-born footballer who plays as a striker.

== Career ==
Liberty Professionals F.C. bought Amofah from Fauzan F.C. in 2002 for an undisclosed fee. He spent the 2004 season on loan at Real Sportive. He scored 10 goals in 15 appearances to become the third highest-scoring player that year. In 2006 he joined Asante Kotoko SC. He joined Bloemfontein Celtic in 2007 and was declared surplus to the club. He joined Danish Superligaen SønderjyskE in 2009 in a two-year contract. In 2010 he joined Beitar Ramla. He returned to Ghana's premier league in 2011 with his former club Liberty Professionals. In 2012 he left Ghana and played with Phatthalung F.C. He played for Sitra Club in January 2014.

== Military Service ==
After retiring from football, he relocated to the United States and joined the US Army, a decision that reflected his discipline and hunger for new challenges. He served with the Air Defense Artillery Unit at Fort Bragg, North Carolina, before retiring from military service in 2022.

== Philanthropy ==
Amofah founded AA Sports International, a non-profit foundation aimed at helping young Ghanaian athletes. The organisation focuses on providing training, equipment, and mentorship to ensure young footballers can pursue their athletic dreams without sacrificing their formal education.

== Education ==
In May 2026, Amofah graduated from the Cornell Law School with a MSc in Legal Studies. He also has a BSc in Homeland security and master's degree in business administration from the University of Maryland; an associate of arts in computer information systems from Glendale Community College.
