= Accra =

Capital and the largest city of Ghana

- Capital city and metropolis
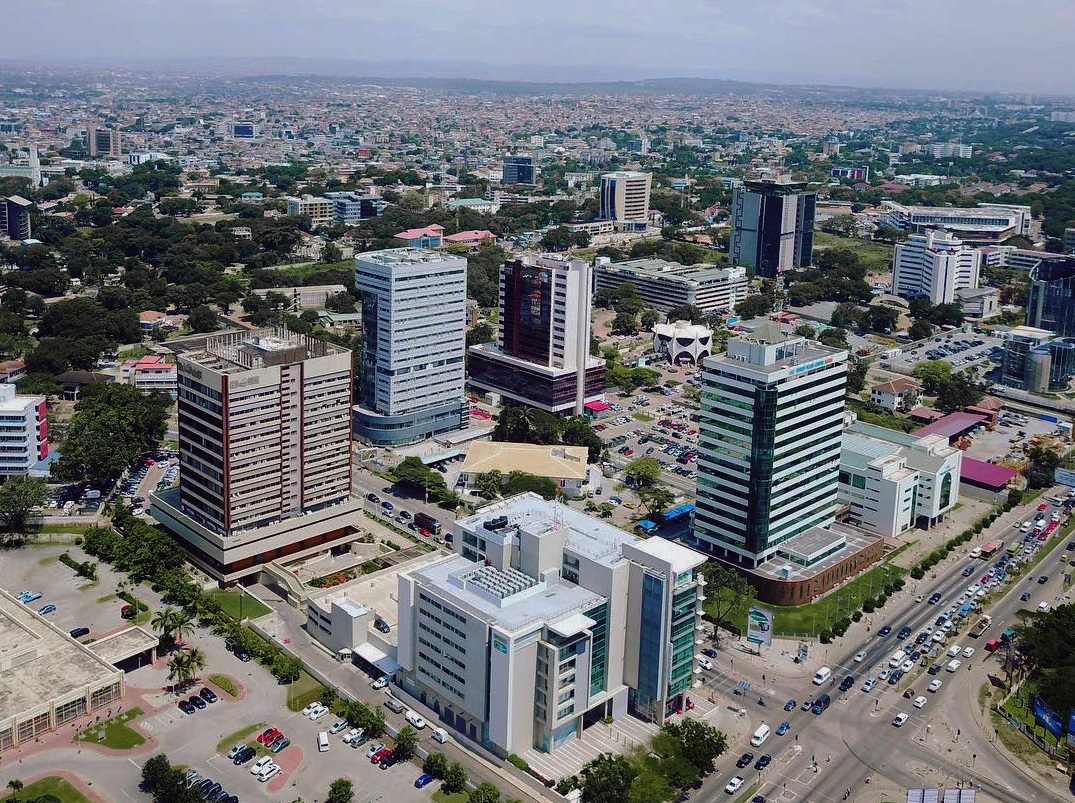
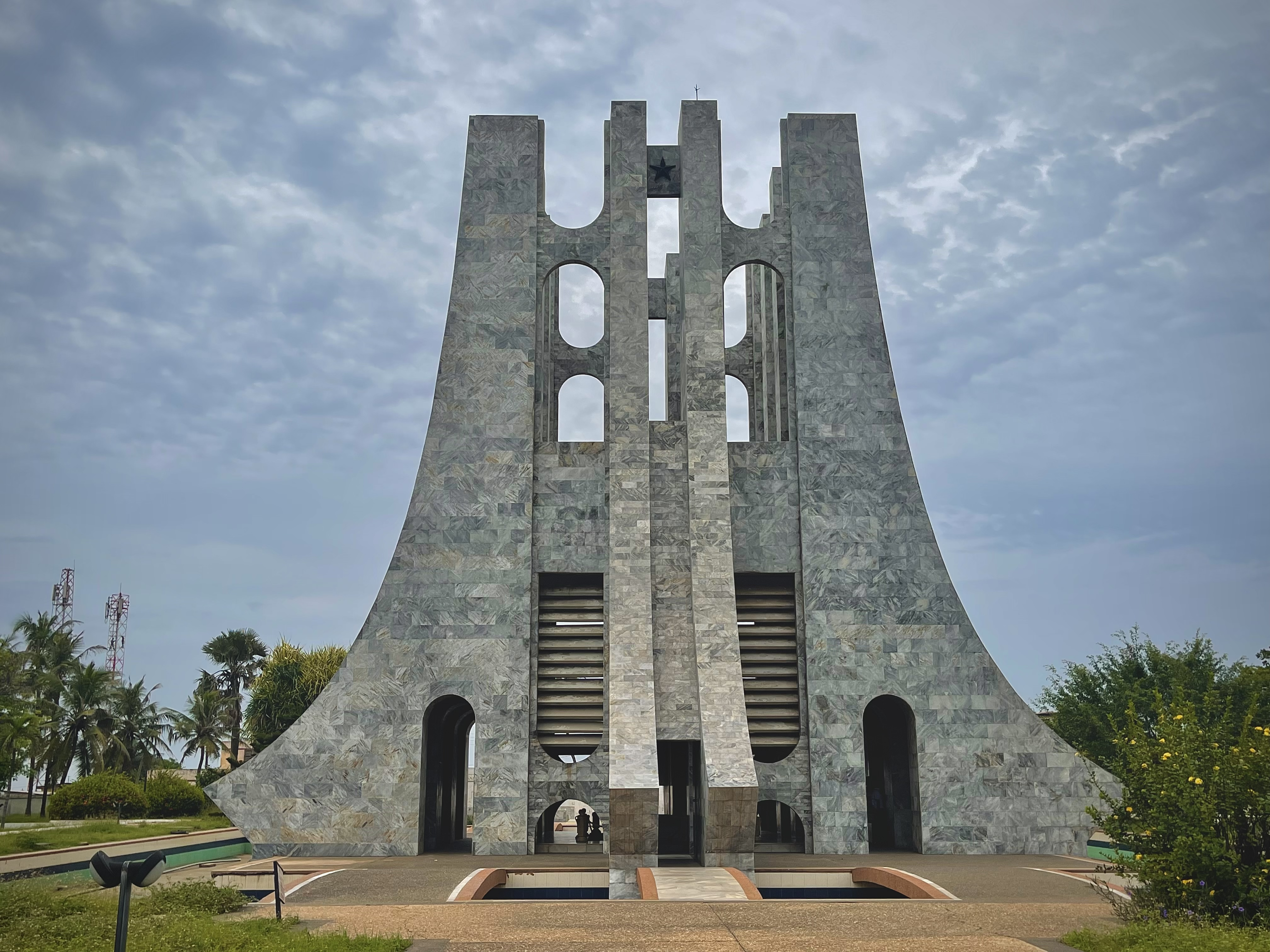
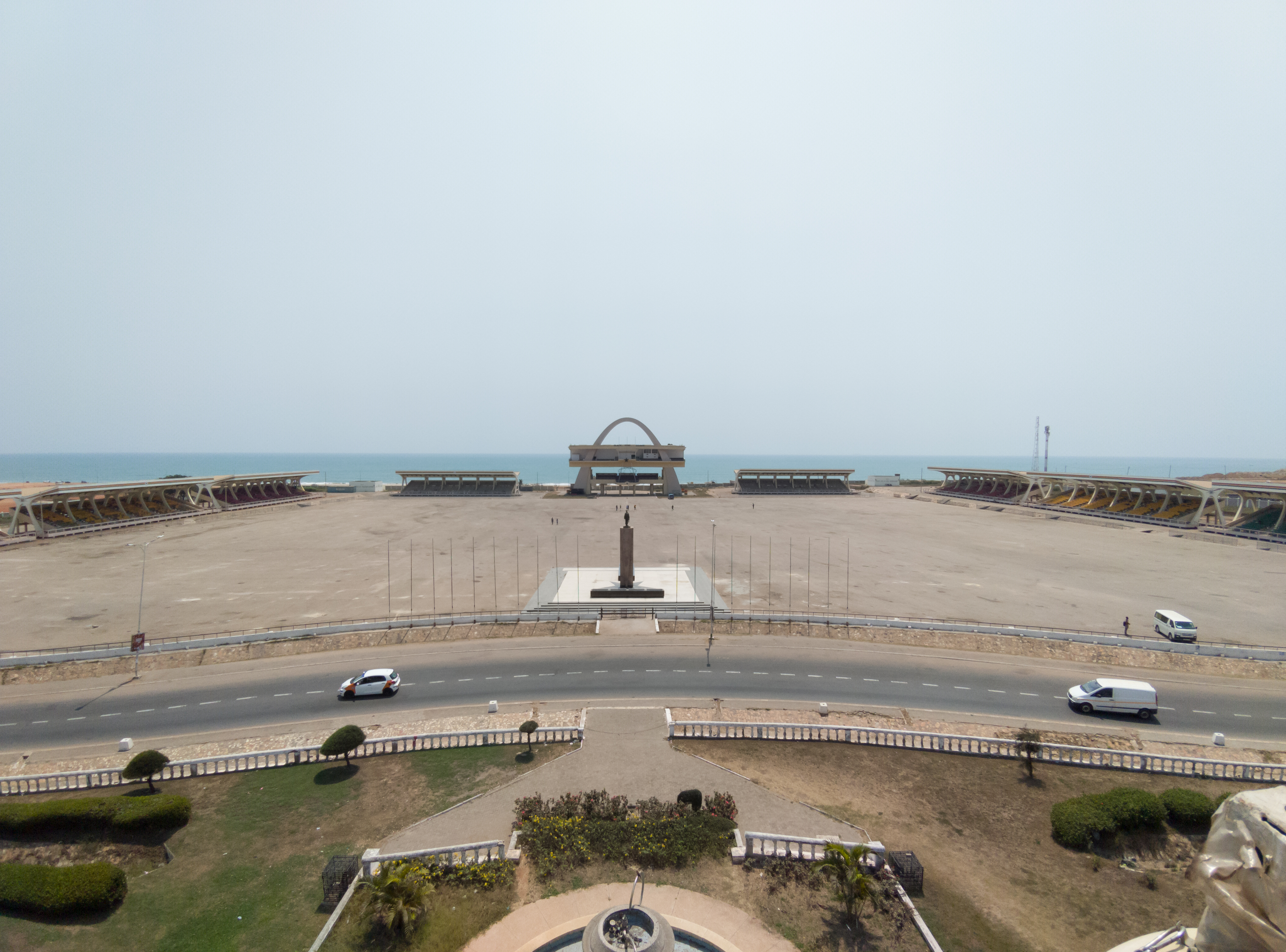
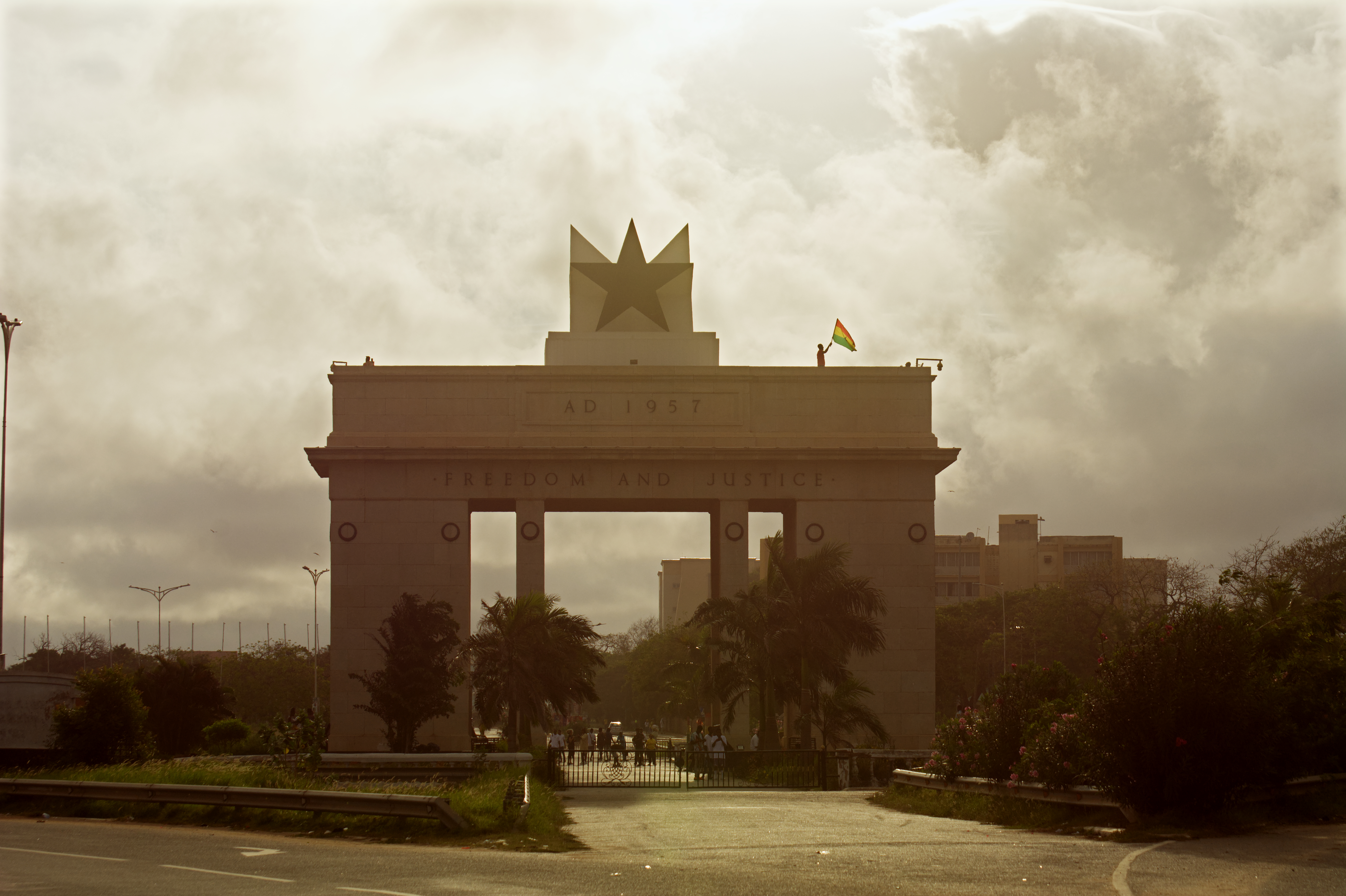
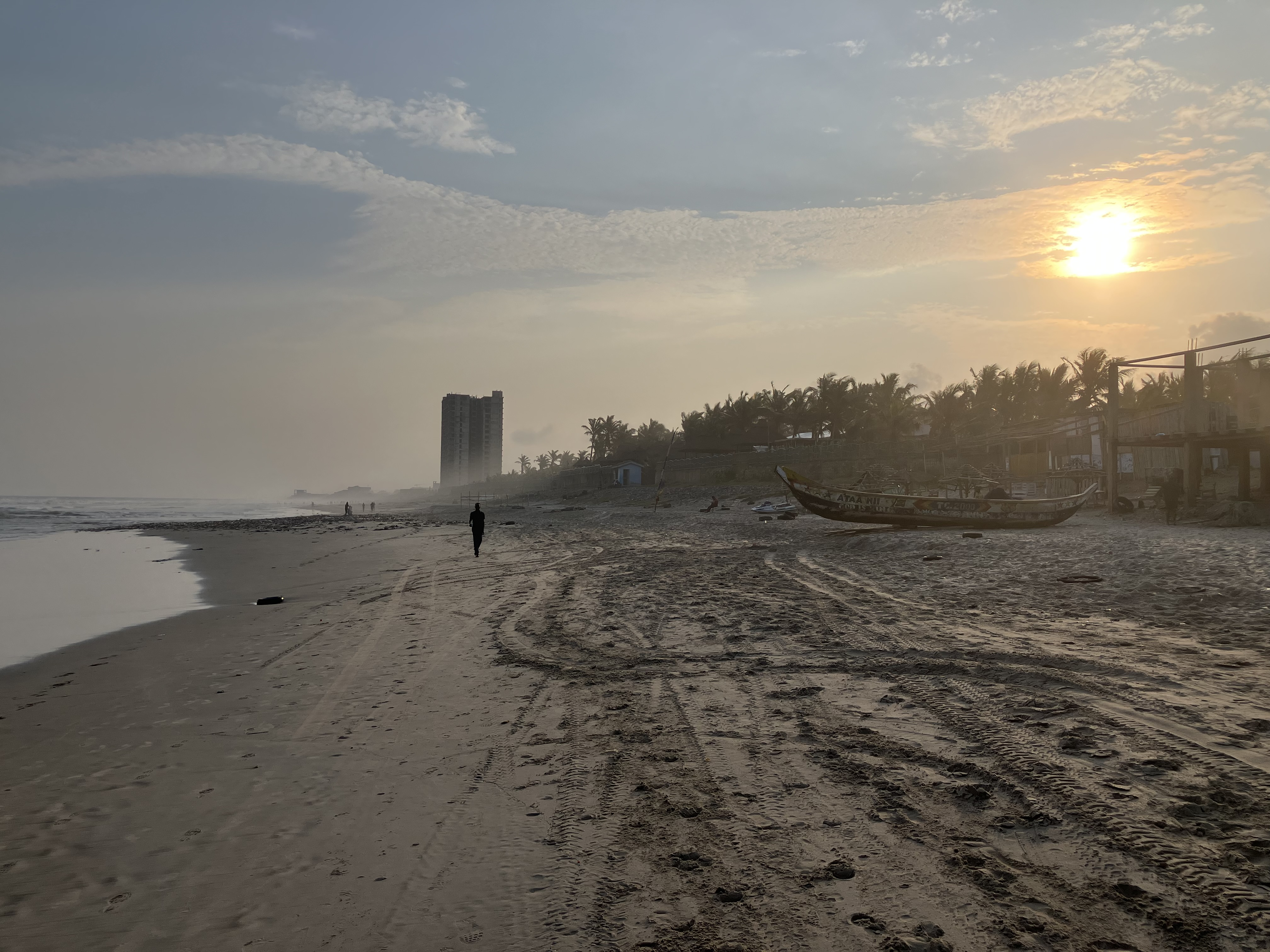
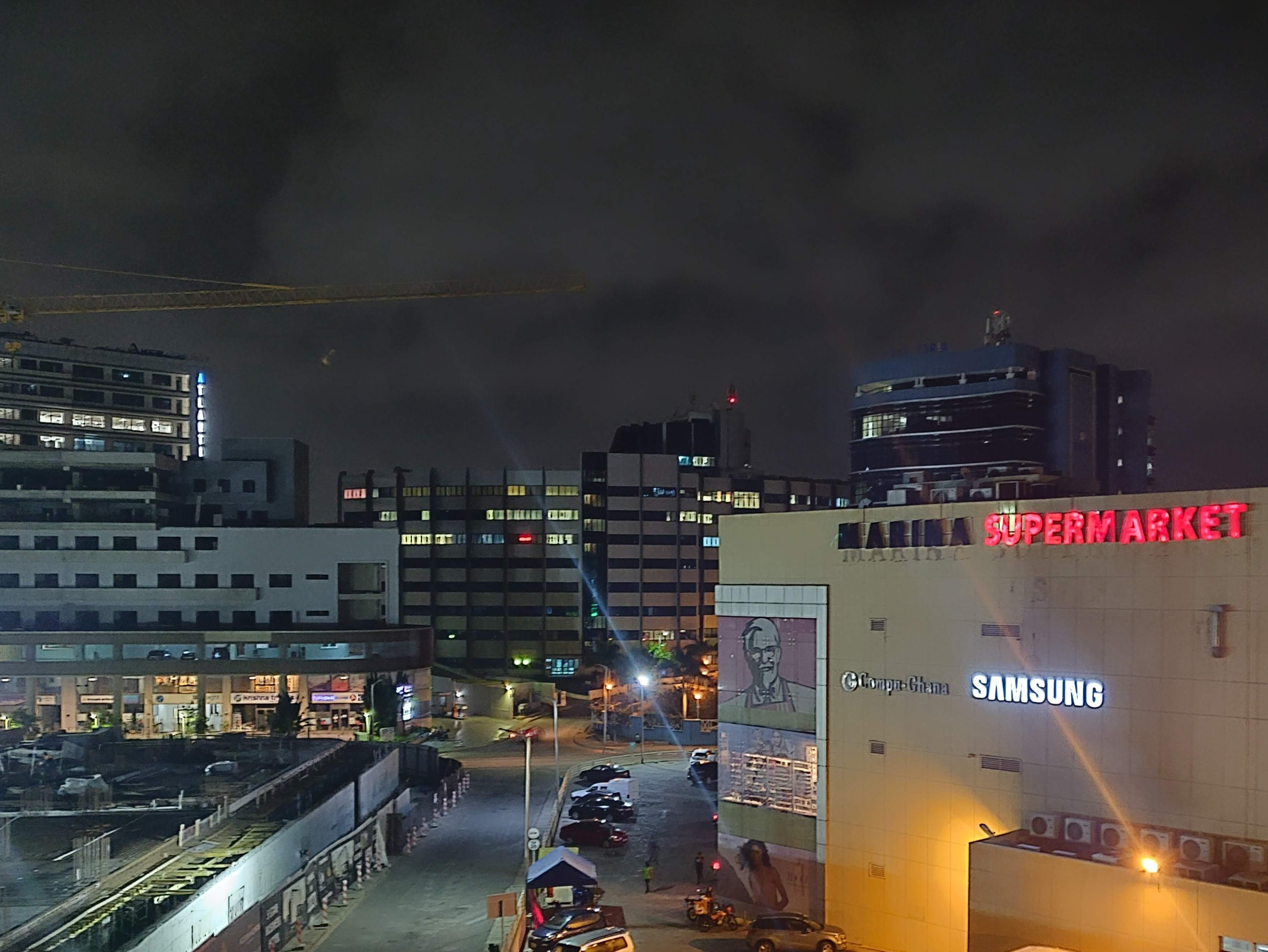
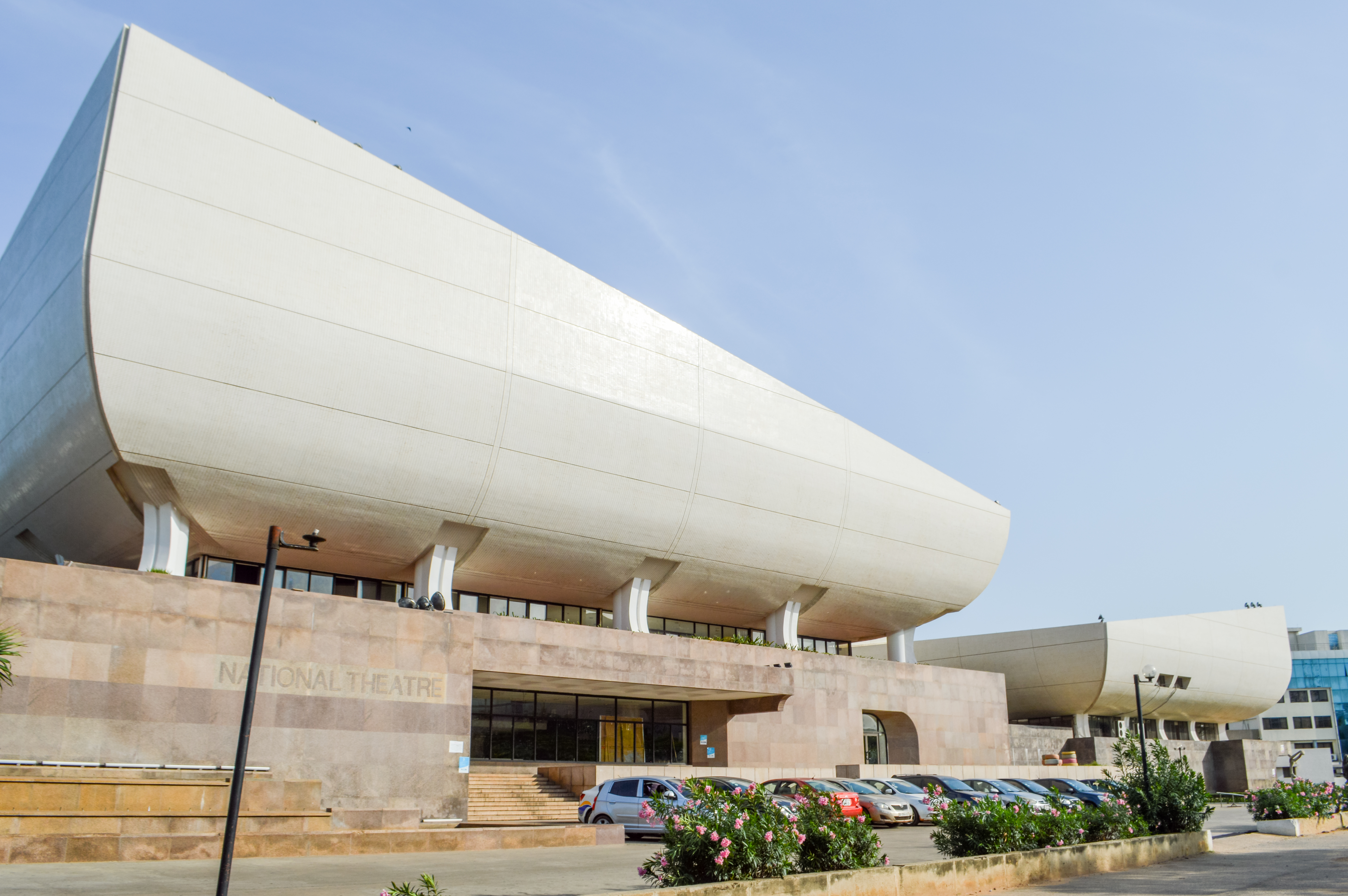
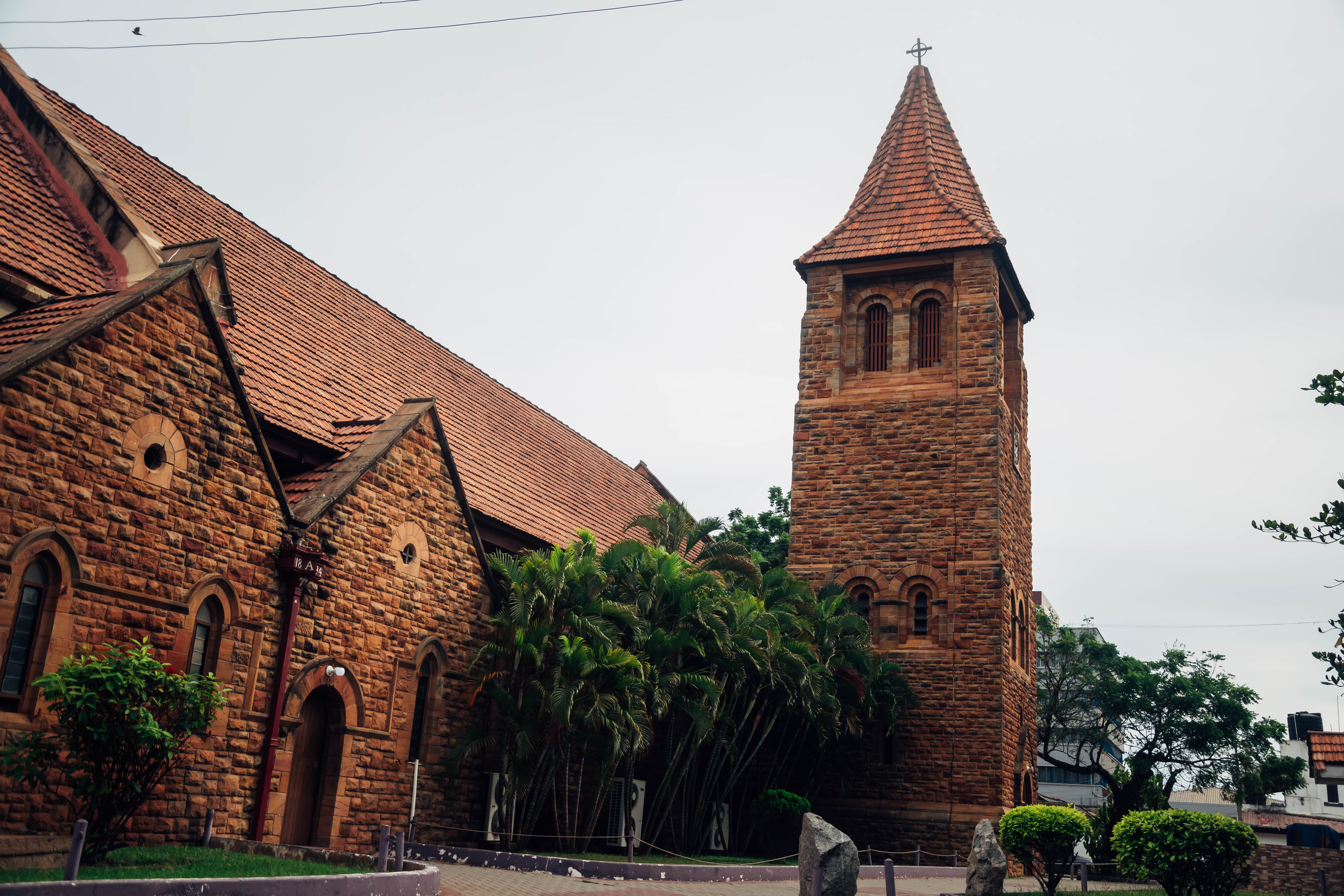
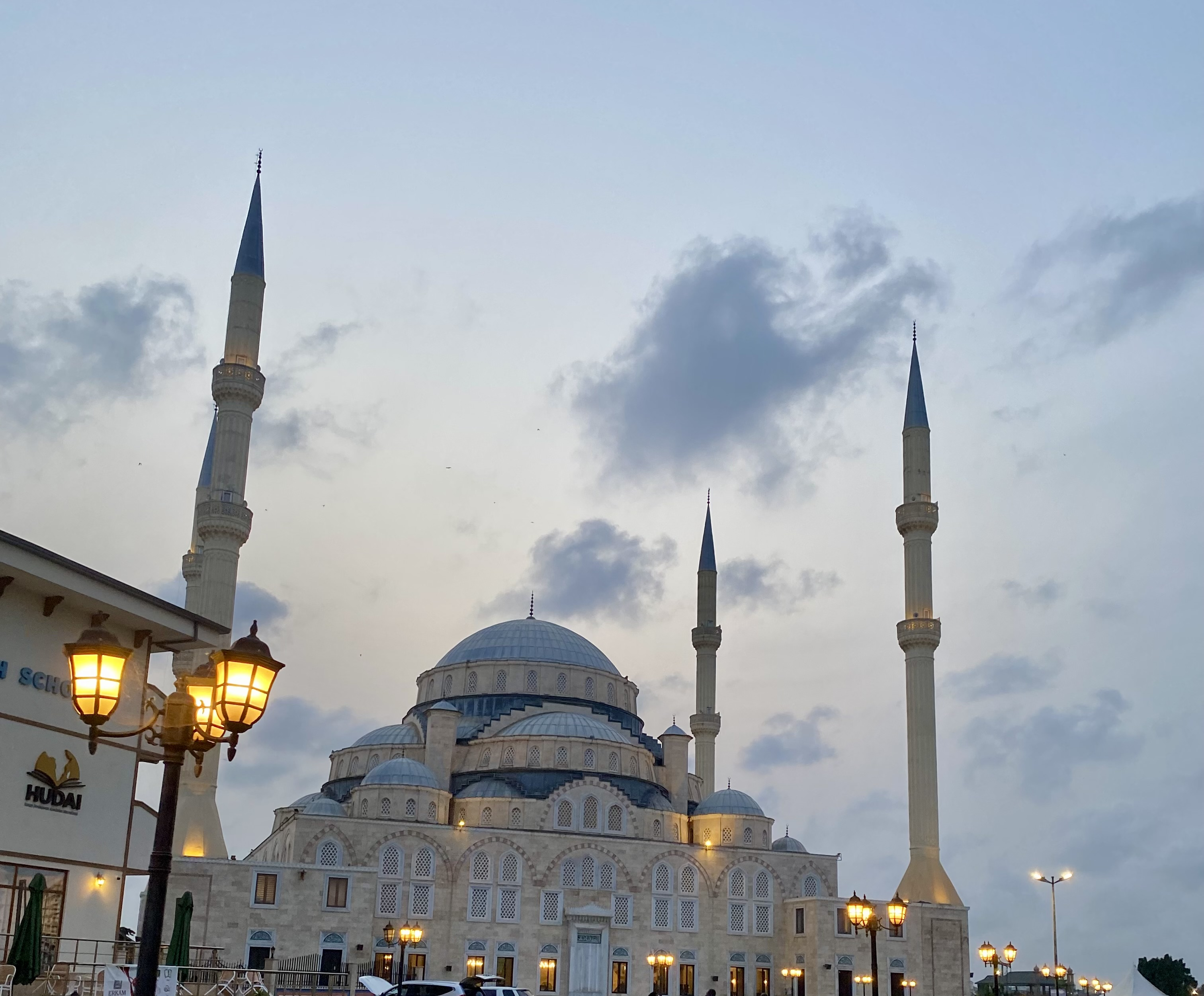
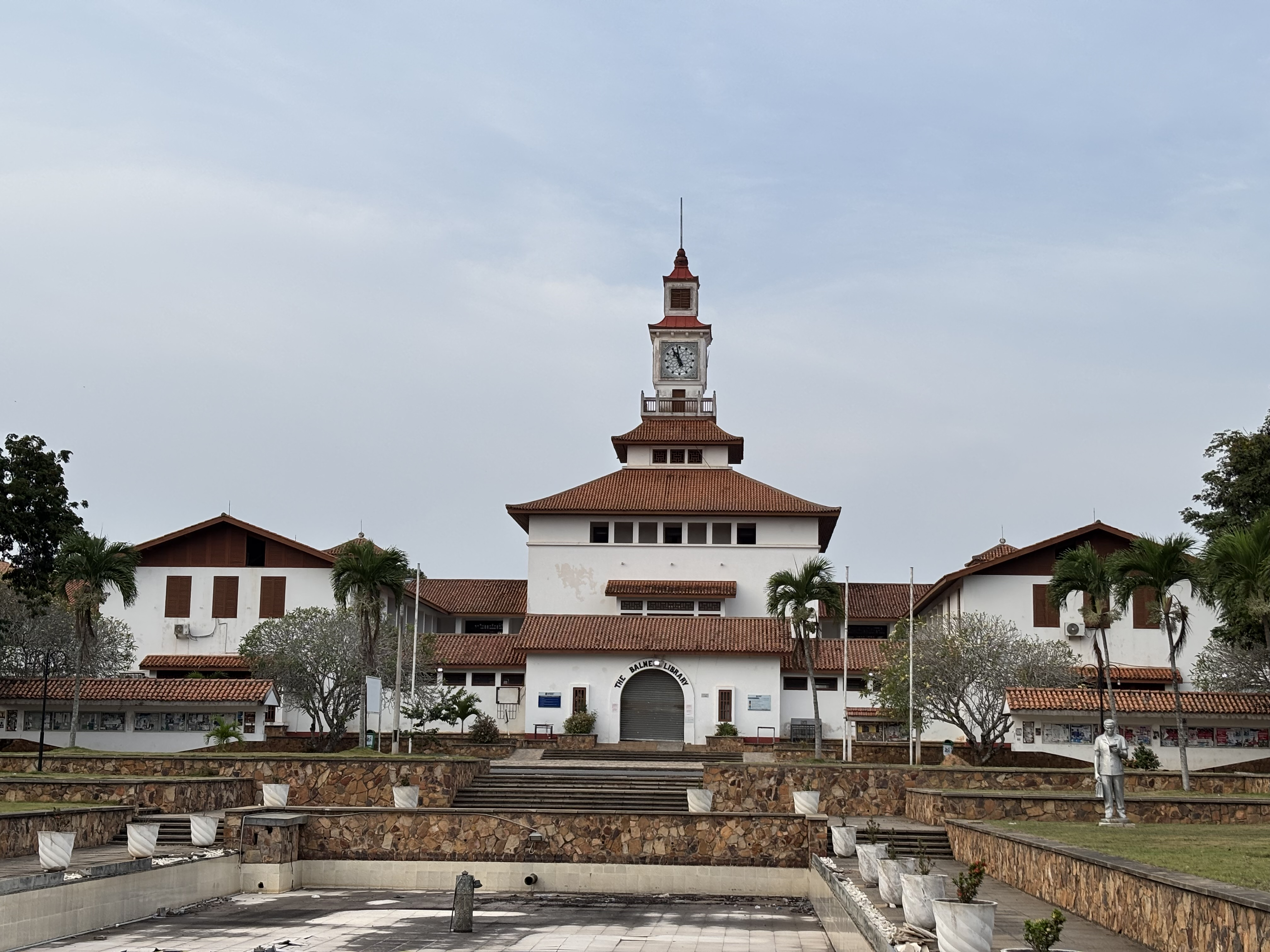
- Accra central skyline Kwame Nkrumah Mausoleum Black Star Square Black Star Gate Labadi Beach Airport City National Theatre Holy Trinity Cathedral Ghana National Mosque University of Ghana

- Flag

- Location within Ghana Location within Africa
- Coordinates: 5°33′N 0°12′W
- Country: Ghana
- Region: Greater Accra Region
- Districts: 13 districts: Accra Metropolitan District, La Dade Kotopon Municipal Assembly, Ledzekuku Municipal District, Krowor Municipal Assembly, Okaikwei North Municipal District, Ablekuma North Municipal Assembly, Ablekuma Central Municipal Assembly, Ablekuma West Municipal Assembly, Ayawaso East Municipal Assembly, Ayawaso North Municipal Assembly, Ayawaso Central Municipal Assembly, Ayawaso West Municipal District, Korle-Klottey Municipal Assembly
- Settled: 15th century

Government
  - Mayor: Elizabeth K. T. Sackey

Area
  - Accra Metropolitan: 20.4 km^{2} (7.9 sq mi)
  - Urban: 199.4 km^{2} (77.0 sq mi)
  - Metro: 3,245 km^{2} (1,253 sq mi)
- Elevation: 61 m (200 ft)

Population (2021 census)
  - Accra Metropolitan: 284,124
  - Rank: 1st
  - Density: 13,900/km^{2} (36,100/sq mi)
  - Urban: 1,782,150
  - Urban density: 8,938/km^{2} (23,150/sq mi)
  - Metro: 5,455,692
  - Metro density: 1,681/km^{2} (4,354/sq mi)
- Demonym: Accran
- Time zone: UTC+00:00 (GMT)
- Postcode districts: GA, GL, GZ
- Area code: 030
- Climate: Tropical savanna climate (Aw)
- Website: ama.gov.gh

Accra (/əˈkrɑː/ ə-KRAH) is the capital and largest city of Ghana, located on the southern coast at the Gulf of Guinea, which is part of the Atlantic Ocean. As of the 2021 census, the Accra Metropolitan District, 20.4 km^{2} (7.9 sq mi), had a population of 284,124, and the larger Greater Accra Region, 3,245 km^{2} (1,253 sq mi), had a population of 5.46 million. The name "Accra" sometimes refers to the territory of the Accra Metropolitan District as it existed before 2008, when it covered 199.4 km^{2} (77.0 sq mi). This territory has since been split into 13 local government districts: 12 independent municipal districts (total area: 179.0 km^{2}) and the reduced Accra Metropolitan District (20.4 km^{2}), which is the only district within the capital to be granted city status. This territory of 199.4 km^{2} contained 1,782,150 inhabitants at the 2021 census, and serves as the capital of Ghana, while the district under the jurisdiction of the Accra Metropolitan Assembly proper (20.4 km^{2}) is distinguished from the rest of the capital as the "City of Accra".

Formed from the merger of separate settlements around British Fort James, Dutch Fort Crêvecoeur (Ussher Fort), and Danish Fort Christiansborg as Jamestown, Usshertown, and Christiansborg, respectively, Accra served as the capital of the British Gold Coast between 1877 and 1957 and has since transitioned into a more modern metropolis. The capital's architecture reflects this history, ranging from 19th-century colonial architecture to modern skyscrapers and apartment blocks.

Accra is the Greater Accra Region's economic and administrative hub, and serves as the anchor of the larger Greater Accra Metropolitan Area (GAMA), which is inhabited by about 4 million people, making it the thirteenth-largest metropolitan area in Africa. In 2020, the Globalization and World Cities Research Network think tank designated Accra as a "Gamma −" level global city, indicating a growing level of international influence and connectedness.

== Etymology ==
The word Accra is derived from the Akan word Nkran meaning "ants", a reference to anthills seen in the countryside around Accra. The name specifically refers to soldier ants, and was applied to the town and people by the Twi speakers.

The name of Accra in the local Ga language is Ga or Gaga, the same name as that of the Ga people and a cognate with Nkran. The word is sometimes rendered with the nasalised vowels as Gã or Gãgã. Historian Carl Christian Reindorf confirmed this etymology, proposing a link between the martial qualities and migratory behaviour of the local ants and those of the Ga people. The link between the ethnonym and ants was explicitly reflected in the recognition of anthills as sacred places. Sometimes ringed by sacred fences (aklabatsa), the tall red mounds dotting Accra's hinterland were seen as microcosms of human community and as nodal points between the known world and the world of the dead.

The Gas used the reference to the invasive species of dark-red swarming ants to connote the military prowess of the Gas and their ancient conquest of Guang speakers residing in the Accra Plains.

The name Ga is a cognate of the name Akan, one of the words in which [g] corresponds to [k] in Akan. Ga also gave its name to the Ga districts surrounding Accra.

The spelling Accra was given to Nkran by Europeans. An earlier spelling used by the Danes was Akra.

== History ==
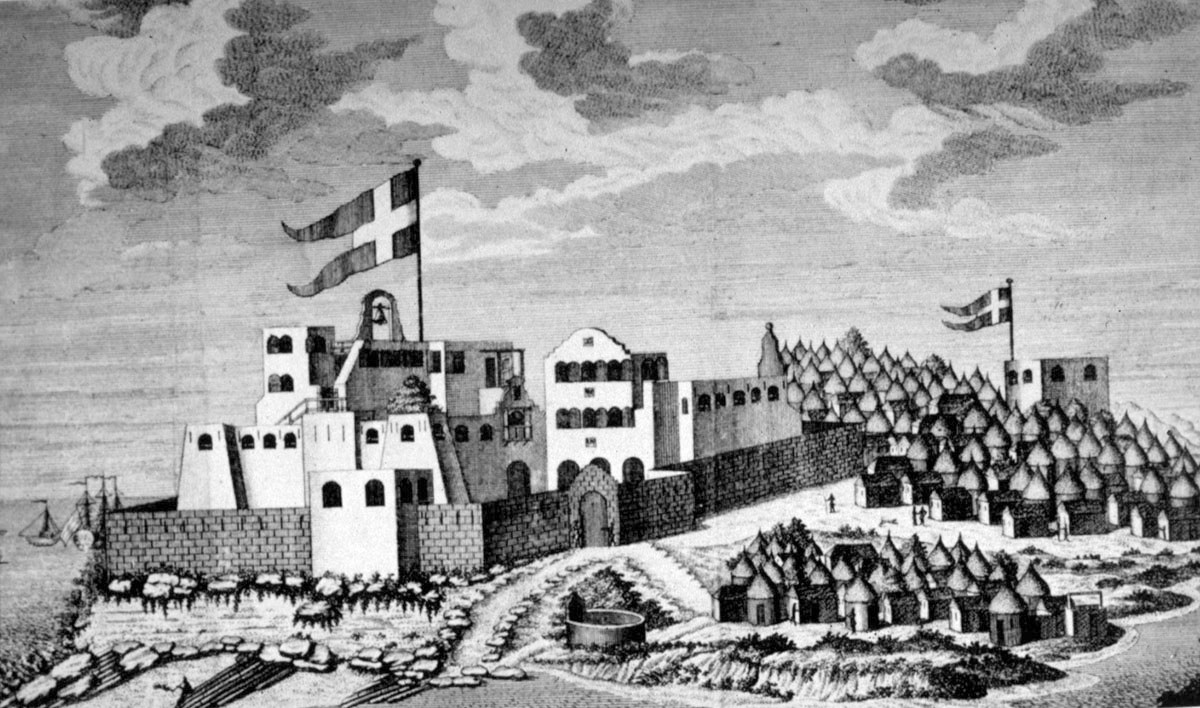
A contemporary drawing of the Danish Fort Christiansborg (later is Osu Castle) in what later is Accra. The outpost to the right is Fort Prøvestenen.

=== Accra Kingdom ===
By the 15th century, the kingdom of Accra ruled the area from the capital at Ayawaso.

Initially, Accra was not the most prominent trading centre; the trading hubs were the ports at Ada and Prampram, along with the inland centres of Dodowa and Akuse. A Portuguese fort was destroyed by the local inhabitants in 1576; trade afterwards was conducted on the beaches. The Dutch later built the nearby Fort Crèvecœur while the British and the Swedes built James Fort and Christiansborg castles, respectively, in the 17th century.

By 1646 the kingdom was a regional power, bolstered by European trade. It depended on the goodwill of the rising Akwamu Kingdom, which controlled the trade routes in the interior. A dispute in 1646 escalated to war when Accra invaded Larteh. At the same time, Accra was weakened by a civil war.

=== Akwamu conquest of Greater Accra ===
In 1677 Akwamuhene Ansa Sasraku, using the circumcision of a visiting Akwamu prince as pretext, attacked Accra. He sacked Ayawaso and beheaded the king, Okai Koi. The king's son, Ofori, retreated to 'Small Accra', the town that had grown up under the walls of Fort Crèvecœur. Ansa Sasraku's attempts to finish off the Accrans were defeated by the guns of the Danish Fort Christianborg. Ofori and his people survived for years, until the Akwamu fomented a rebellion amongst the Danish garrison, and the fort was turned over to the Portuguese. Ansa Sasraku returned in 1681, burning Osu town and Small Accra and chasing Ofori to exile in Fetu. As Akwamu continued to expand, strips of land east and west were added to the Accra province.

=== British power increases ===
Britain gradually acquired the interests of all other countries beginning in 1851, when Denmark sold Christiansborg (which they had acquired from the Swedes) and their other forts to the British. The Netherlands was the last to sell out, in 1871. In 1873, after decades of tension between the British and Ashantis, the British captured Kumasi, destroying portions of the city. The British then captured Accra in 1874, and in 1877, at the end of the second Anglo-Asante War, Accra replaced Cape Coast as the capital of the British Gold Coast. This decision was made because Accra had a drier climate relative to Cape Coast. Until this time, the settlement of Accra was confined between Ussher Fort to the east and the Korle Lagoon to the west.

As the newly established Gold Coast's administrative functions were moved to Accra (1877), an influx of British colonial administrators and European settlers grew around the Christiansborg (what later is Osu, Ministries, Ridge, Labone, and Cantonments) began, and the city began to expand to accommodate the new residents. Victoriaborg was formed in the 19th century as an exclusively European residential neighbourhood, located to the east of the city limits of the time. The boundaries of Accra were further stretched in 1908, after a bubonic plague epidemic. This expansion entailed the creation of a native-only neighbourhood, intended to accommodate members of the native population as a means of relieving congestion problems in the overcrowded city centre. Adabraka was thus established to the north of the city.

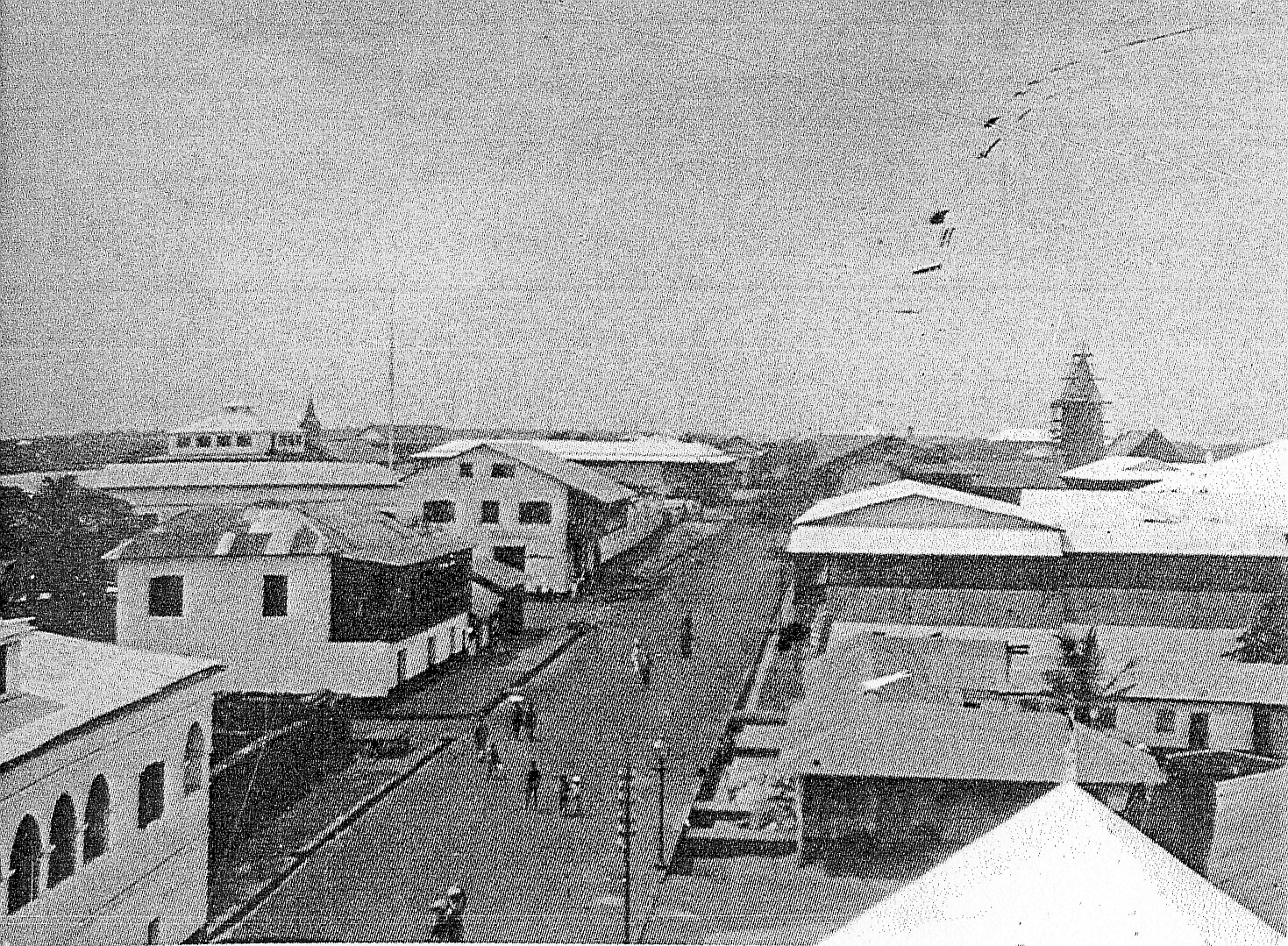
A main street of central Accra sometime between 1885 and 1908

By the 1920s, transportation between Accra and the inland cities producing exportable commodities was enhanced. This allowed cocoa to become Accra's largest export and allowed commerce to overtake government as the primary element in the city.

Among the achievements of Guggisberg was the building of a bridge across the Korle Lagoon in 1923, which increased settlement at Korle Bu, Korle Gonno and Chokor, to the west of the lagoon. Guggisberg also oversaw the building of a hospital (Korle-Bu) and secondary school (Achimota).

=== After World War II ===
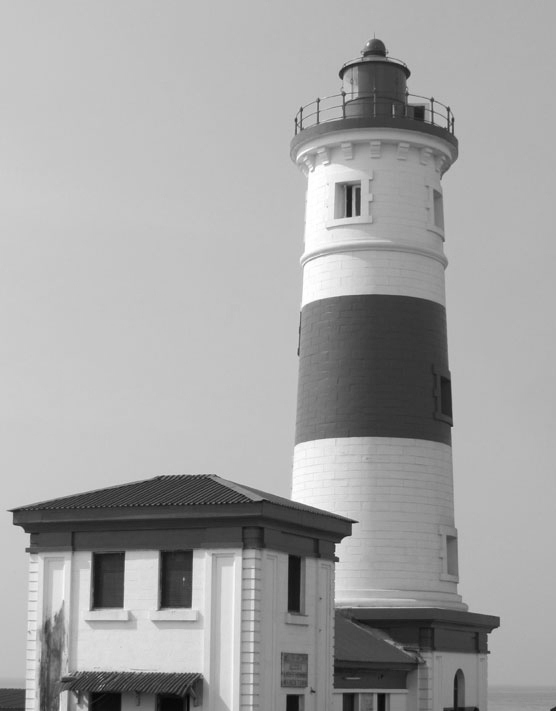
Jamestown Lighthouse in Jamestown/Usshertown

In 1948, Ghana remained a colony of Great Britain following World War II. The chief of Osu Alata, Nii Kobina Bonney III, had set up a boycott of European goods across the country due to the rise of prices for essential commodities. At the same time, veterans of the war were fighting for their benefits and promised pay.

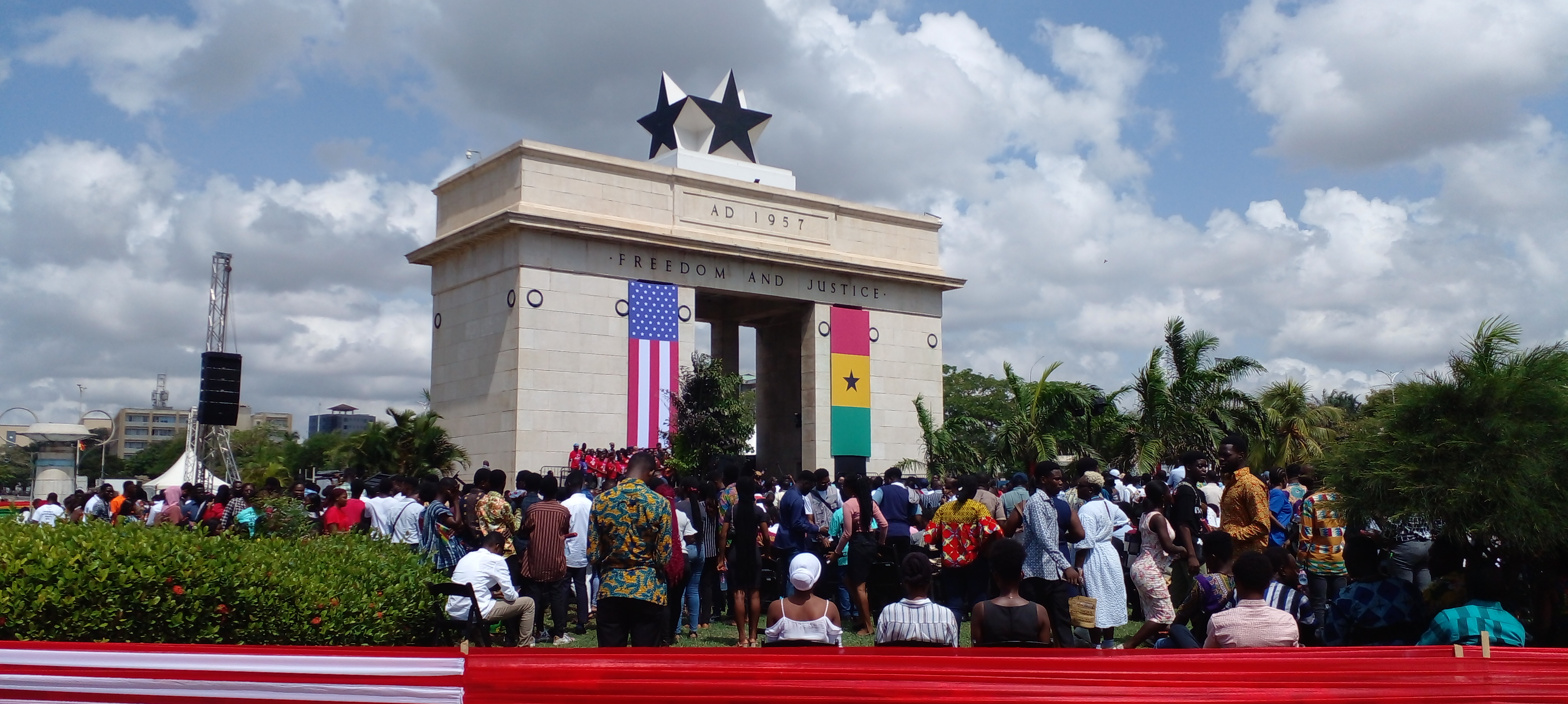
Black Star Square

After Kwame Nkrumah became Ghana's first Prime Minister in 1957, he created his own plan for Accra's development. Nkrumah proposed creating spaces to inspire pride and nationalism in his people and people throughout Africa.

The Parliament, Supreme Court of Ghana, Black Star Square and the Bank of Ghana are located in Accra. The city is a transportation hub, home to Accra International Airport, and railway links to Tema, Sekondi-Takoradi and Kumasi. Accra has become a location for national and international business conferences, such as the BarCamp Ghana series, organised by GhanaThink Foundation.

== Geography ==
Accra

Climate chart (precipitation, max. and min. temperature)
J	F	M	A	M	J	J	A	S	O	N	D
12 33 25	26 33 25	61 33 25	88 33 25	151 32 25	190 30 24	63 29 23	21 28 23	43 30 23	80 31 24	37 32 25	27 32 25
- █ Average max. and min. temperatures in °C
- █ Precipitation totals in mm
- Source: BBC Weather
Imperial conversion
J	F	M	A	M	J	J	A	S	O	N	D
0.5 91 77	1 91 77	2.4 91 77	3.5 91 77	5.9 90 77	7.5 86 75	2.5 84 73	0.8 82 73	1.7 86 73	3.1 88 75	1.5 90 77	1.1 90 77
- █ Average max. and min. temperatures in °F
- █ Precipitation totals in inches

As a coastal city, Accra is vulnerable to the impacts of climate change and sea level rise, with population growth putting increasing pressure on the coastal areas. Drainage infrastructure is particularly at risk, which has implications for people's livelihoods, especially in informal settlements. Inadequate planning regulation and law enforcement, and perceived corruption in government processes, lack of communication across government departments and lack of concern or government co-ordination with respect to building codes are impediments to progressing the development of Accra's drainage infrastructure, according to the Climate & Development Knowledge Network.

Climate data for Accra (Accra International Airport), 1991–2020 normals, extremes 1936–present
Month	Jan	Feb	Mar	Apr	May	Jun	Jul	Aug	Sep	Oct	Nov	Dec	Year
Record high °C (°F)	36.6 (97.9)	38.0 (100.4)	36.5 (97.7)	38.7 (101.7)	35.0 (95.0)	33.5 (92.3)	32.3 (90.1)	32.8 (91.0)	33.9 (93.0)	34.5 (94.1)	38.0 (100.4)	37.5 (99.5)	38.7 (101.7)
Mean daily maximum °C (°F)	32.6 (90.7)	33.0 (91.4)	33.0 (91.4)	32.7 (90.9)	31.8 (89.2)	29.8 (85.6)	28.6 (83.5)	28.4 (83.1)	29.6 (85.3)	31.1 (88.0)	32.1 (89.8)	32.4 (90.3)	31.3 (88.3)
Daily mean °C (°F)	28.5 (83.3)	29.2 (84.6)	29.2 (84.6)	29.0 (84.2)	28.3 (82.9)	26.8 (80.2)	25.9 (78.6)	25.6 (78.1)	26.5 (79.7)	27.5 (81.5)	28.3 (82.9)	28.6 (83.5)	27.8 (82.0)
Mean daily minimum °C (°F)	24.5 (76.1)	25.4 (77.7)	25.4 (77.7)	25.3 (77.5)	24.7 (76.5)	23.8 (74.8)	23.3 (73.9)	22.9 (73.2)	23.4 (74.1)	23.8 (74.8)	24.6 (76.3)	24.7 (76.5)	24.3 (75.7)
Record low °C (°F)	15.0 (59.0)	16.7 (62.1)	18.9 (66.0)	19.4 (66.9)	18.6 (65.5)	17.8 (64.0)	17.8 (64.0)	17.2 (63.0)	18.3 (64.9)	19.4 (66.9)	17.8 (64.0)	16.7 (62.1)	15.0 (59.0)
Average precipitation mm (inches)	11.8 (0.46)	25.5 (1.00)	61.1 (2.41)	87.8 (3.46)	151.4 (5.96)	189.6 (7.46)	63.0 (2.48)	21.0 (0.83)	42.9 (1.69)	80.0 (3.15)	37.2 (1.46)	27.2 (1.07)	798.5 (31.44)
Average precipitation days (≥ 1.0 mm)	0.8	1.6	4.1	4.7	8.3	10.2	5.4	3.6	5.4	5.7	2.8	1.5	54.1
Average relative humidity (%)	77	78	79	80	81	85	84	83	81	82	80	80	81
Mean monthly sunshine hours	185.9	189.7	211.9	221.2	219.4	157.9	150.8	146.8	173.0	237.6	244.9	222.7	2,361.8
Percentage possible sunshine	51	57	57	60	57	42	39	39	48	64	69	61	54
Average ultraviolet index	11	12	12	12	11	11	11	11	12	12	11	10	11
Source 1: NOAA
Source 2: Deutscher Wetterdienst (extremes 1936–1990, humidity 1952–1967)

== Administration ==
The administration of Accra occurs at two levels. Strategic initiatives, such as the urban transportation project, are coordinated between district authorities.

== Cityscape ==
Geographically, the areas west of Ring Road West, extending as far west as the saltponds and south of Graphic Road, are considered Accra West.

== Demographics ==
The period between 1960 and 1970 saw more rapid industrialization and expansion in Accra's manufacturing and commercial sectors. This contributed to higher rural-urban migration to the city, and consequently a higher population growth rate.

56% of the population of Accra is under 24 years of age. 51% of the population are females, and the remaining 49% males. This gives a males-to-females ratio of 1:1.04. The greater number of females is a reflection of the nationwide trend, where the estimated ratio of males to females is 1:1.03.

== Economy ==
In 2008, the World Bank estimated that Accra's economy constituted around US$3 billion of Ghana's total gross domestic product (GDP).

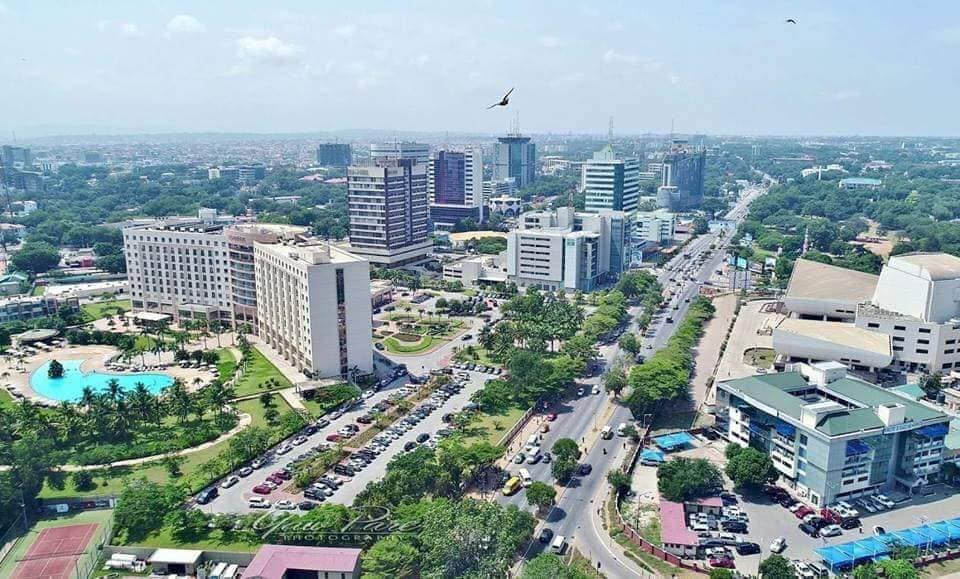
Accra Central, Accra, Ghana

Accra is a centre for manufacturing, marketing, finance, insurance, and transportation. Its financial sector incorporates a central bank, nine commercial banks (with 81 branches), four development banks (with 19 branches), four merchant banks (with seven branches), three discount houses, one home finance mortgage bank, building societies, Ghana Stock Exchange, foreign exchange bureaus, finance houses, insurance companies, insurance brokerage firms, two savings and loans companies, and real estate developers, with industrial sites and residential developments. The road network in the Accra Metropolitan Area totals 1,117 kilometres (694 mi) in length.

There are over 50,506 identified residential properties in Accra, and about 4,054 commercial/industrial/mixed properties, with a total rateable value of GH¢13,849,014.

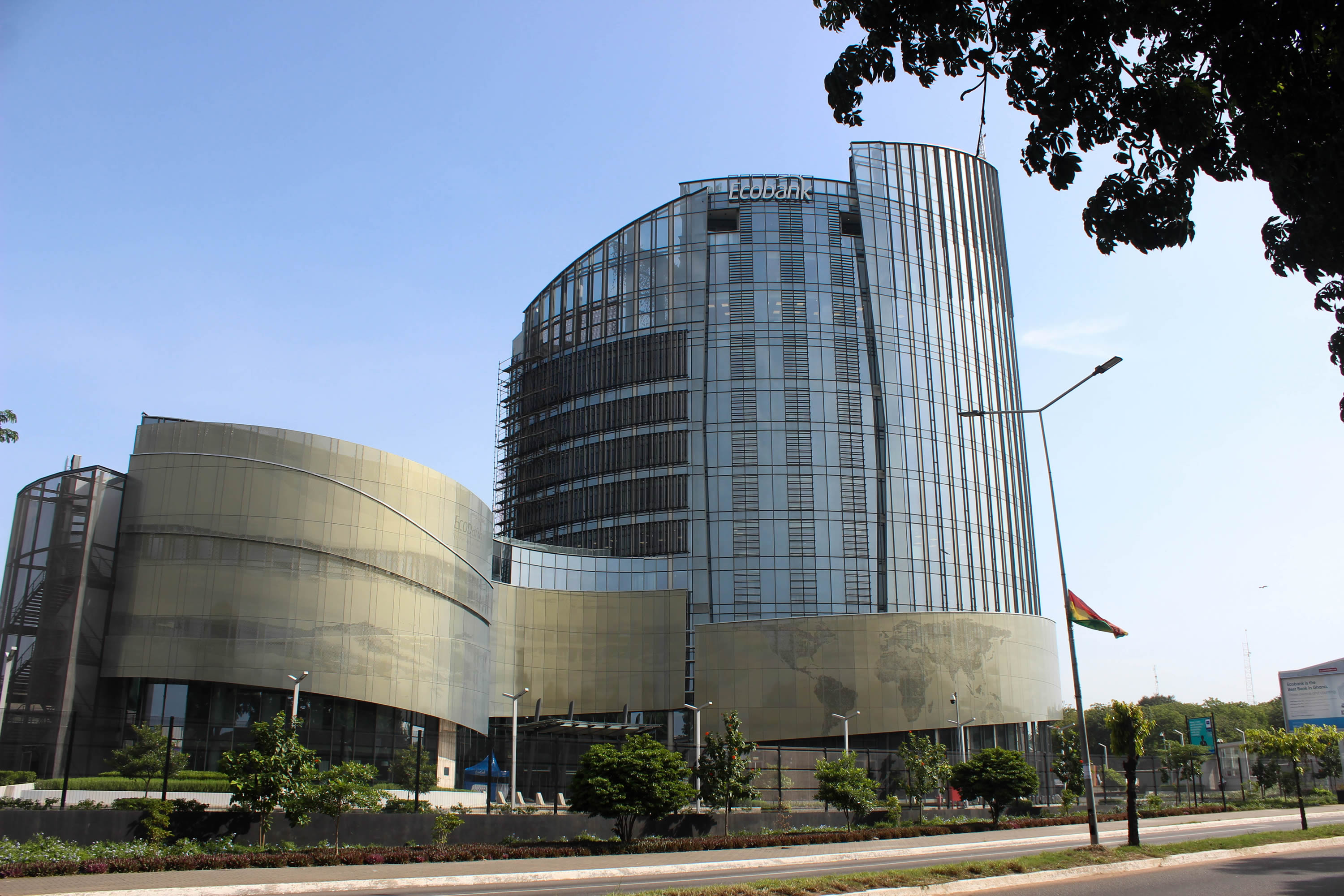
Ecobank Ghana Limited

The sectors of Accra's economy consist of the primary, secondary (manufacturing, electricity, gas, water, construction) and tertiary sectors (supermarkets, shopping malls, hotel, restaurant, transportation, storage, communication, financial intermediation, real estate service, public administration, education, health and other social services). The tertiary service sector is the city's largest, employing about 531,670 people. The second-largest, the secondary sector, employs 22.34% of the labour force, or around 183,934 people. 12.2% of the city's workforce are reportedly unemployed, totalling around 114,198 people.

== Education ==
=== Pre-school ===
Pre-school comprises nursery and kindergarten. In 2001, there were 7,923 children (3,893 girls and 4,030 boys) in pre-schools in Accra. In 2010, the enrolment rate at Pre-school was 98%.

=== Primary school ===
Primary school enrolment of girls is higher than that of boys. In 2010, the enrollment rate at primary school level was 95%.

=== Junior high school (JHS) ===
In the 2001/2002 academic year, 61,080 pupils had enrolled in Accra, representing 57.17% of the 129,467 school-age 12–to-14-year-olds. In 2010, the enrolment rate at Junior high school level was 95%. The ratio of girls is higher at this level.

=== Senior high school (SHS) ===
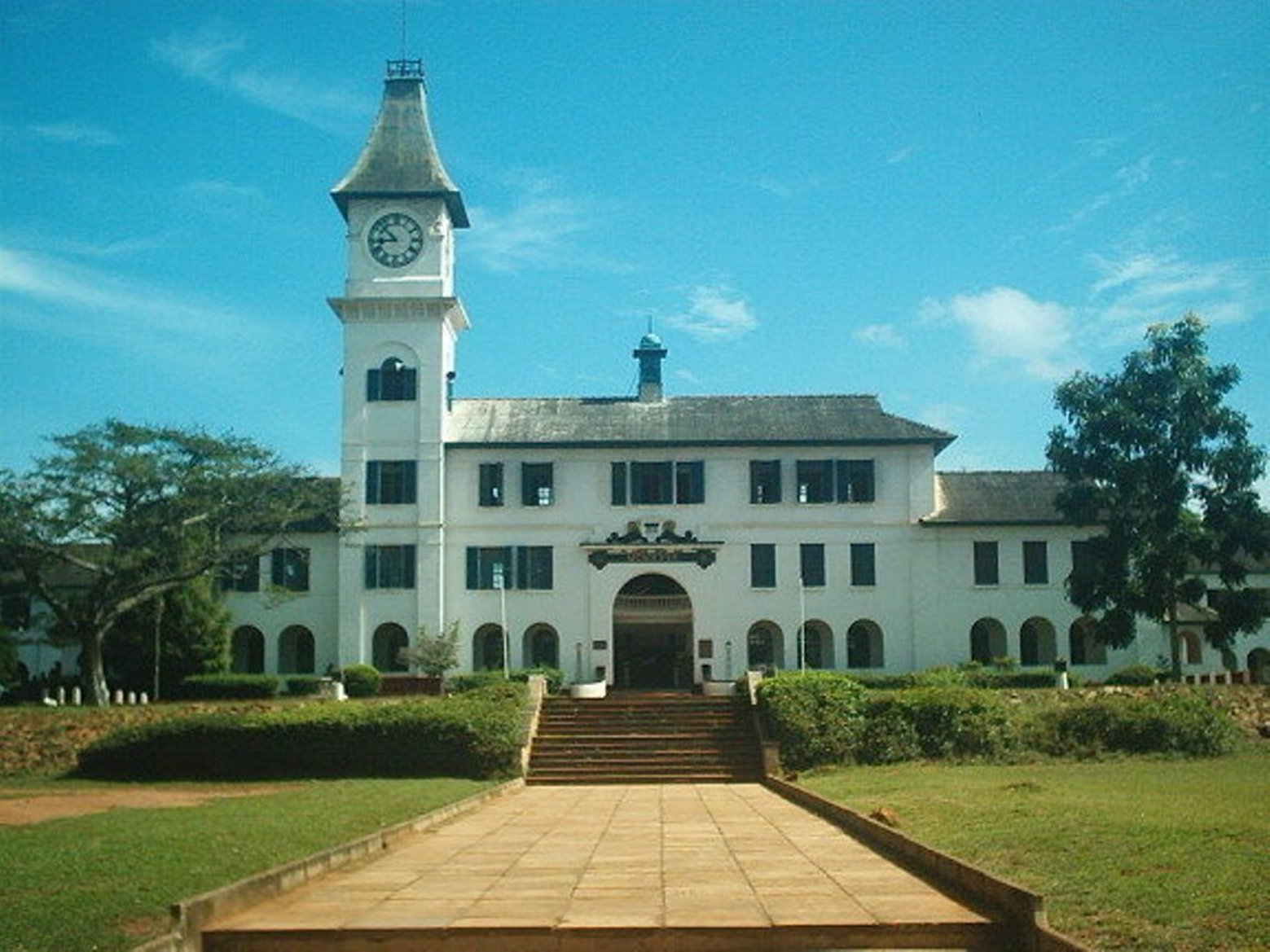
Achimota School

The transition rate between junior high and senior high school increased from 30% in 1990 to 50% in 2001. The number of students grew by 23,102 between 1990 and 2005, an increase of about 2,310 a year, since 2010 the senior high school enrolment rate has been 95%.

Ghana International School (GIS), a private non-profit A-Level school founded in 1955 for children from ages 3–18, is located in Accra's Cantonments. Abelemkpe is the home of Lincoln Community School, a private, non-profit International Baccalaureate (IB) school for students aged 3–18, established in 1968.

A number of public secondary schools lie on the outskirts of Accra: Achimota School, also referred to as "Motown", which was founded in 1924 and opened in 1927; the Accra Academy, known as "Accra Aca"; the Presbyterian Boys' Secondary School in Legon, also known as "Presec"; Wesley Grammar School – WESS-G Dansoman, St. Mary's Senior High School, also referred to as "Merriez", is a girls' boarding school in Ghana; St. Thomas Aquinas Senior High School, also known as "Quinas"; Accra High School also known as "Ahisco"; West Africa Secondary School, also known as "WASS"; the Accra Girls' Senior High School, also known as "Agiss"; Kaneshie Secondary Technical School ("Kateco"); the Armed Forces Secondary Technical; and St. John's Grammar School; among others.

=== Universities ===
The University of Ghana is located 13 kilometres (8.1 mi) north of the city centre at Legon. A number of other public and private universities and tertiary institutions have since been founded in Accra, some of which are listed below.

Institution	Location	Public/Private	Affiliation
University of Ghana (Legon)	Legon	Public	
Accra Institute of Technology (AIT)	Cantonments	Private	Kwame Nkrumah University of Science and Technology
Regional Maritime University (RMU)	Nungua	Private	University of Ghana
Ghana Communication Technology University (GCTU)	Tesano	Public	
Islamic University College (ICUG)	East Legon	Private	University of Ghana
Knutsford University College (Knutsford)	East Legon	Private	University of Ghana
Methodist University College (MUCG)	Dansoman	Private	University of Ghana
Regent University College of Science and Technology (Regent)	Mataheko	Private	Kwame Nkrumah University of Science and Technology
Ashesi University (Ashesi)	Berekuso	Private	
Heritage Christian College	Amasaman	Private	Kwame Nkrumah University of Science and Technology
Central University (Central)	Mataheko/Miotso	Private	
Zenith University College (ZUC)	La, Trade Fair	Private	University of Cape Coast
Ghana Institute of Journalism (GIJ)	Ridge	Public	University of Ghana
Accra Technical University(ATU)	Tudu	Public	
Advanced Business University College (ABUC)	Kaneshie	Private	University of Education, Winneba
Ghana Institute of Management and Public Administration (GIMPA)	Achimota	Public	
The University of Professional Studies (UPS)	Legon	Public	
National Film and Television Institute (NAFTI)	Cantonments	Public	University of Ghana
Valley View University (VVU)	Oyibi	Private	
African University College of Communications (AUCC)	Adabraka	Private	University of Ghana
University of Professional Studies, Accra (UPSA)	East-Legon	Public	Accra
Academic City University College (ACUC)	Haatso	Private	
Pentecost University (Pentvars)	Sowutuom	Private	
Wisconsin International University College, Ghana	North Legon	Private	

=== Institutes ===
- French Institute of Ghana

== Environment ==
=== Water ===
As a growing city, Accra has both a water supply and scarcity challenge. Water access uses a patchwork of different delivery processes.

=== Pollution ===
Accra as a growing city, with vehicles and other urban pollution sources, has an increasing amount of air pollution and plastic pollution. Accra's urban ecosystem has been a site of dumping by international waste networks, with the Agbogbloshie suburb known for its e-waste recycling sites, and the Kantamanto Market as handling an overwhelming flow of used fast fashion from other parts of the world. Both sites are sources of pollution and trash for other parts of the urban ecosystem.

Air pollution varies seasonally, and the average measure PM_{2.5} average concentration of 49.5 μg/m^{3}. Live monitoring of air pollution is done at three sites in the city of Accra. A 2021 review by the Environmental Protection Agency in Ghana found that the levels were exceeding national and international standards for health.

Plastic management is also an increasing challenge. Use of plastic water bottles water sachets and other packaging for food safety, and use of plastic during events like COVID-19 have increased plastic pollution. The beaches around Accra have plastic pollution, and surrounding fisheries are impacted by plastics. Non-profit organizations have been formed to collect the plastic and an increasingly growing network of recyclers and informal waste recovery networks. Activists and researchers largely attribute the issue to upstream use of plastics.

== Decongestion exercises ==
There's been decongestion exercises carried out by successive mayors in the city to help solve the hawking menace, flood issues and ensure road safety in the city.

Growing population and construction within the city has been resulting in a reduction in Urban green space. A 2021 study of low income communities in the city found increasing concern and desire among these communities for urban green spaces for recreation and health. A 2018 study of greenspaces in the city, found the ones that do exist are important for mammal biodiversity in the city.

== Transportation ==
Accra International Airport (KIA)

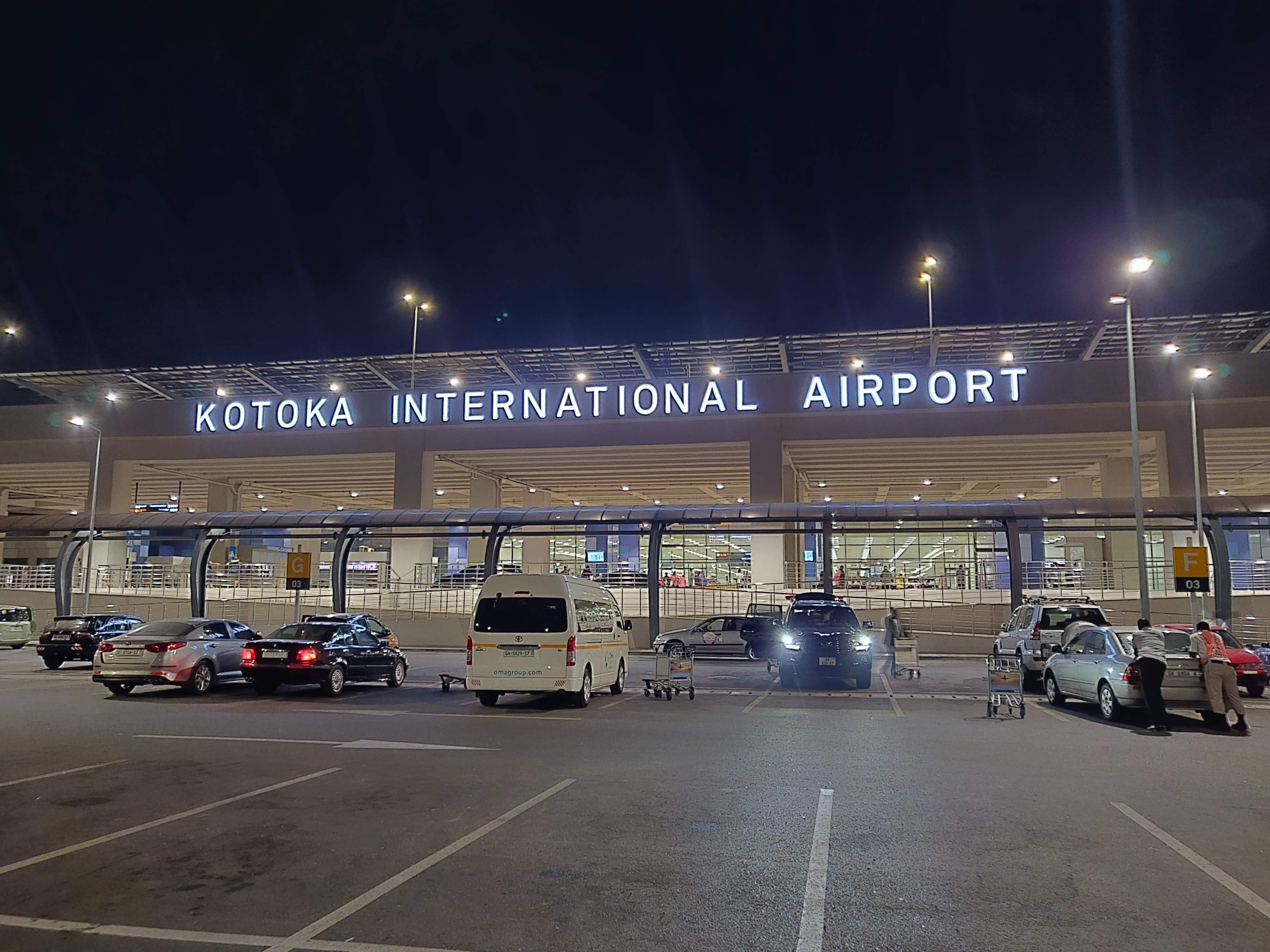
KIA International Terminal Building

Terminal 3 Departure Hall

Accra is on the Atlantic coast and has not served as a port city since the 1950s. Instead, the Port of Tema, about 29 km to the east along the Atlantic coast, was developed for deepwater shipping to and from Ghana as it can accommodate larger ships; the port opened in 1961.

=== Rapid transit ===
Accra is connected by railway line to Kumasi and Takoradi. There is a suburban railway line from Accra Central Station to Tema.

=== Aviation ===
Accra is served by Accra International Airport, which has civil and military uses. Located 6 miles (9.7 kilometres) from downtown Accra, the airport handles all of the city's scheduled passenger services. There are plans to build a second airport to relieve the aviation pressure on the Accra International Airport. This new airport will be located at Prampram in Accra and will be constructed by China Airport Civil Construction. This plan was still under review in 2020, as additional runways at Kotoka are in consideration as an alternative to a new international airport.

=== Taxis ===
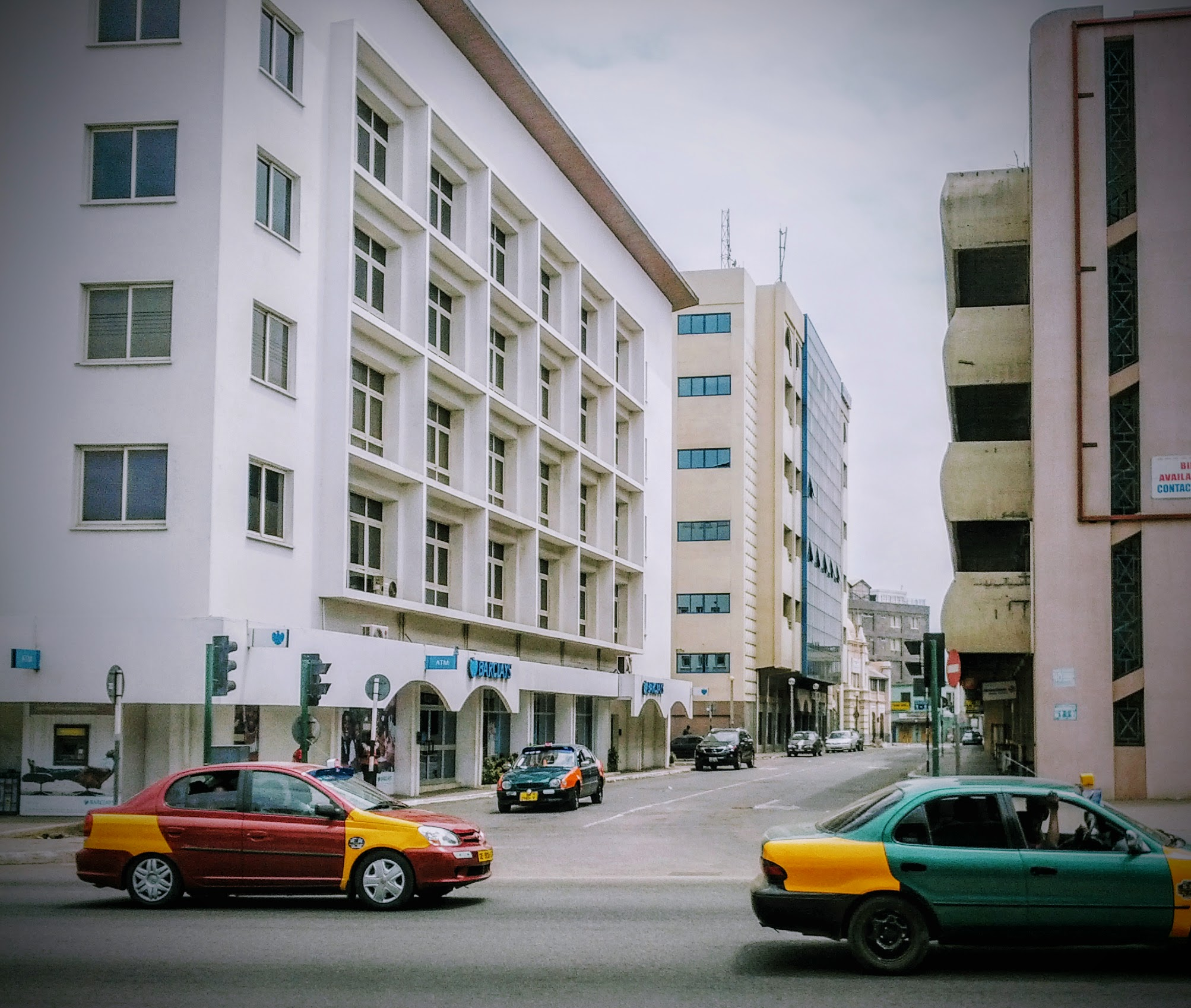
Taxis on Accra's High Street

Accra has a taxi network and taxi ranks, and most taxis lack a meter system, so price negotiation is required between the passenger and driver. Metered taxis operate in the city, and tend to be more expensive. Taxis in Ghana are painted in two colours: the four bumpers fenders are yellow/orange, and the rest of the car is in a colour of the operator's choice. These taxis usually function on a shared ride model, where several passengers share one vehicle and the fare is calculated based on the distance traveled. More modern taxi services such as Uber, Taxify, and Yango have joined the market, providing a more advanced and comfortable alternative. Some taxi drivers might charge extra for luggage or late-night trips while some also offer fixed prices and allow for advance bookings, offering a more reliable and secure option.

=== Tro tros and buses ===
Tro tros (minibuses or cargo vans modified for passenger transport) is the third biggest, and second most efficient and cost-effective way of getting around the city. The buses are typically minibuses or vans. Some models used as tro tros are Nissan Urvan 15-seaters and Mercedes Benz Sprinter or D 309 vans. Trotros are typically decorated with decals such as flags of countries or (local and international) soccer teams, popular sayings, proverbs (in English or local languages) or Bible verses. Trotros pick up and offload passengers at designated bus stops along their regular routes. Tro tros will also usually offload at undesignated locations along the route, by passenger request. Most routes commence and terminate at urban transport terminals such as the Neoplan station or the Achimota Transport Terminal.

== Culture ==
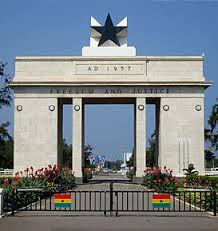
The Black Star Square in Accra

Tourism in Ghana accounted for 1,087,000 international tourist arrivals in 2011. Accra is the Greater Accra region's tourist hub, sporting hotels, monuments, museums and nightclubs. The city has three five-star hotels: the Labadi Beach Hotel, the La Palm Royal Beach Hotel and the Movenpick Ambassador Hotel. The Golden Tulip Hotel and Novotel Accra, located in Accra's central business district, are ranked four stars. There are three-star hotels, including the Hotel Wangara, Hotel Shangri-La and Erata Hotel, and budget hotels. The Accra International Conference Centre and other meeting facilities provide venues for conference tourism.

Ghana's film industry is growing. Its first documentary addressing the impacts of climate change premiered in Accra on 14 October 2022.

== Twin towns – sister cities ==
Accra has six official sister cities, as recognised by Sister Cities International:

City	Province / Region / State	Nation	Year	Ref
Johannesburg	Gauteng	(South Africa)		
Sterling	Connecticut	(United States)		
Washington	District of Columbia	(United States)	2006	
Columbia	South Carolina	(United States)		
Columbus	Ohio	(United States)	2015	
Chattanooga	Tennessee	(United States)	2024	

== UNESCO World Book ==
In October 2022, Accra was named by the United Nations Educational, Scientific and Cultural Organization (UNESCO) as World Book Capital for 2023.

== See also ==
- 2015 Accra explosion
- 2017 Atomic Junction gas explosion
- List of people from Accra

== Bibliography ==
- Wilks, Ivor (1957). "The Rise of The Akwamu Empire, 1650-1710". Transactions of the Historical Society of Ghana. 3 (2): 25–62. JSTOR 41405705.
