= Gordon Awandare =

Ghanaian parasitologist

Gordon A Awandare
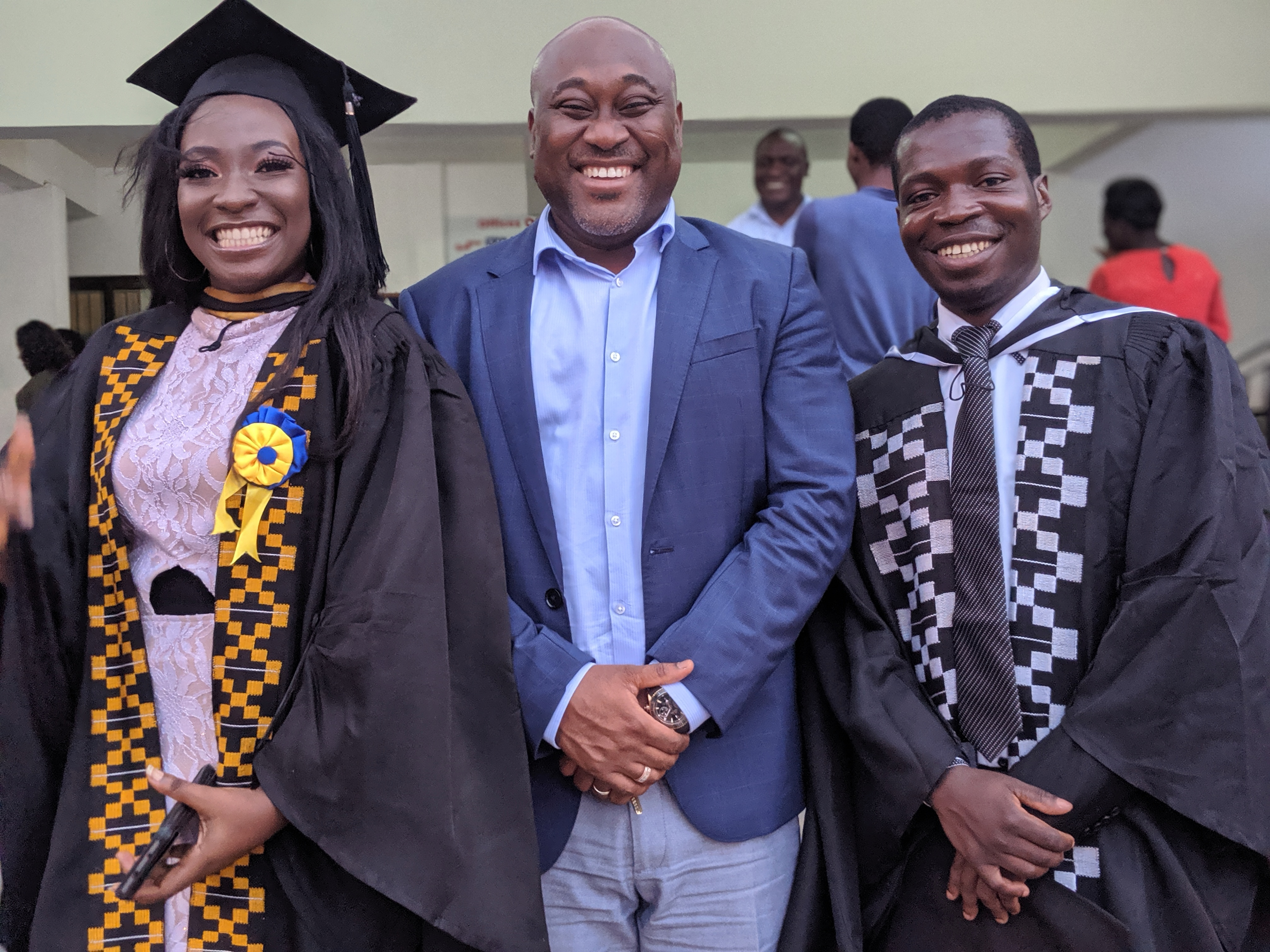
- Gordon Awandare (middle) with his students during a 2019 graduation
- Born: Gordon Akanzuwine Awandare; Kandiga, Kassena Nankana West District
- Education: Notre Dame Seminary Senior High School University of Ghana University of Pittsburgh
- Known for: Pro-Vice Chancellor of the University of Ghana and Founding Director of WACCBIP
- Awards: Fellow of Ghana Academy of Arts and Sciences, Royal Society Pfizer Award 2015
- Scientific career
- Fields: Malaria parasite biology, Immunology, Pathogenesis
- Workplaces: University of Ghana, West African Center for Cell Biology of Infectious Pathogens, Walter Reed Army Institute of Research, University of Pittsburgh
- Thesis: Role of Macrophage Migration Inhibitory Factor (MIf) And MIf Promoter Polymorphisms in the Pathogenesis of Severe Malarial Anemia (2007)
- Doctoral advisor: Douglas J. Perkins
- Website: https://www.ug.edu.gh/provc-asa/biography-professor-gordon-akanzuwine-awandare

Gordon Akanzuwine Awandare is a Ghanaian parasitologist and the Pro-Vice Chancellor in charge of Academic and Student Affairs at the University of Ghana. Prior to his appointment in January 2022, he was the founding Director of the West African Center for Cell Biology of Infectious Pathogens (WACCBIP).

He was the chairman of the CK Tedam University of Technology and Applied Sciences (CKT-UTAS) governing council and the Africa Global Editor of the journal Experimental Biology and Medicine.

== Early life and education ==
Gordon Awandare was born in Kandiga, a small village in northeastern Ghana. During childhood, he contracted malaria several times a year, at a time when treatment for the disease was scarce.

Awandare was awarded a BSc in biochemistry in 1998 and an MPhil in Biochemistry in 2002 from the University of Ghana. In 2003, he was alerted to PhD positions at the University of Pittsburgh (Pennsylvania, USA) earmarked for African fellows, and moved to the USA just eight months later. In 2007, he graduated with a PhD in Infectious Diseases and Microbiology from the School of Public Health, with a thesis on severe malarial anemia. Following his doctoral studies, he spent three years at the Walter Reed Army Institute of Research (Maryland, USA), where he continued studying malaria, focusing on the Plasmodium falciparum parasite.

Prof. Awandare returned to the University of Ghana in 2010 to establish his own research group. Without start-up funding, he used US credit cards to support his work whilst applying for grants, and two years later received funding from both the Royal Society and the National Institutes of Health.

== Parasitology research ==
Awandare's research focuses on the malaria parasite Plasmodium falciparum and the infection it causes in children. His work focuses on both the immune response of the patient to infection, and the pathogenic processes of the parasite itself. In particular, he studies cell-surface receptors that could be potential vaccine targets and his studies use parasites from infected children in Ghana, so that any vaccines developed will be applicable to real-life cases. He was the first to report the possibility of parasite phenotypic switching in in vitro cultures when shaken. Prof. Awandare also led significant research into molecular diagnosis of infectious diseases in lower income setting in Africa. In addition, He is significantly pushing for policy change in tackling hearing impairment in Ghana.

During the 2020 COVID-19 global pandemic, Awandare led a group of scientist at the University of Ghana and the Noguchi Memorial Institute of Medical Research to sequence SARS-COV2 virus isolates from Ghanaian patients. In January 2021, he reported the importation of the UK strain of the virus in travellers arriving in Ghana from other African countries. Awandare advocated for the re-imposition of ban on large funerals and weddings to reduce COVID-19 case spike in early 2021.

== West African Center for Cell Biology of Infectious Pathogens (WACCBIP) ==
In 2013, Awandare led a consortium from the University of Ghana in a proposal to set up a new African Centre of Excellence to research infectious pathogens in Africa. The consortium consisted of faculty from the Department of Biochemistry, Cell and Molecular Biology (BCMB) and the Noguchi Memorial Institute for Medical Research (NMIMR), with support from staff of the University of Ghana Computing Systems (UGCS).

Following the award of $8 million from the World Bank in November 2013, Awandare became the Founding Director of The West African Center for Cell Biology of Infectious Pathogens (WACCBIP). The organization has since received further funding from the World Bank ACE project and the Wellcome Trust DELTAS programme. The mission of WACCBIP is to "improve the diagnosis, prevention, and control of tropical diseases in sub-Saharan Africa by providing advanced-level training and research excellence in cell and molecular biology", with a remit to build capacity by training African scientists at masters, doctoral and post-doctoral levels. The center has expanded to study malaria, Buruli ulcer, HIV, and tuberculosis.

== Leadership in universities and other institutions ==
Gordon Awandare currently serves as Pro Vice-Chancellor with responsibility for Academic and Student Affairs (ASA) at the University of Ghana. The appointment took effect from 1 January 2022, taking over from Prof. Daniel Frimpong Ofori, Provost of the College of Humanities who was appointed to act as Pro-Vice-Chancellor (ASA) from 27 October 2021. Within the University of Ghana, he has also been a member of Academic Board and served on the Business and executive committee for many years.

Awandere is the current and founding chairman of the CK Tedam University of Technology and Applied Sciences (CKT-UTAS) governing council, a Navrongo university which was previously one of four campuses of the University for Development Studies in the Upper East Region of Ghana, before it gained autonomous status in 2021. He has previously served on the Governing Council of the University of Development Studies, Tamale, where he was also the chairman of the university's Audit Report Implementing Committee. He is a visiting professor of immunology at the Faculty of Health and Life Sciences, Oxford Brookes University in the Oxford, UK, and a fellow of the Ghana Academy of Arts and Sciences.

Prof. Awandare has also been chairman, Centre Management Committee for WACCBIP, and member of Management committees/boards for many units, including the Office of Research Innovation and Development (ORID), Noguchi Memorial Institute for Medical Research, School of Pharmacy, Legon Centre for International Affairs and Diplomacy, School of Biological Sciences, and School of Nuclear and Allied Sciences, Ghana Atomic Energy Commission. He has also chaired or served on numerous ad hoc committees at the University of Ghana, including the Search Committee for Vice Chancellor in 2020/2021. He is also the Network's Chairman of the established West African Network of Infectious Diseases ACEs (WANIDA), which will aim to enhance collaboration among West African health research institutions funded under the World Bank's African Centres of Excellence (ACE) Impact project.

== Awards and recognition ==
Gordon Awandare was awarded the 2025 Bailey K. Ashford Medal by the American Society of Tropical Medicine and Hygiene (ASTMH), in recognition of his "outstanding and sustained contributions to tropical medicine, infectious disease research, and scientific capacity development in Africa".

In 2015, Awandare was awarded the Royal Society Africa Prize, which recognises innovative biological research scientists whose research also contributes towards significant capacity building in Africa. The award was made for "achievements in molecular and cellular studies of malaria, including how malaria parasites invade red blood cells and cause disease".

He has received multiple honors at University of Ghana. In 2014, he received the Distinguished Award for Meritorious Service, in 2020, he received the Citation of Honor, in recognition of contributions to science development in the College of Basic and Applied Sciences and the University of Ghana in general, and in 2021 he received the Meritorious Award in Recognition of Outstanding Service in the College of Basic and Applied Sciences.

In 2019, Awandare has been named the first Africa Global Editor of the Experimental Biology and Medicine (EBM) journal.

== Grants ==
Awandare has been a recipient and lead of several internationally competitive grants;

Year	Funder	Description	Amount
2012	National Institute of Allergy and Infectious Diseases	Role of Complement Receptor 1 in Erythrocyte Invasion by Plasmodium Falciparum	US$42,322
2013	World Bank Group	Africa Centers of Excellence Project I for the establishment of WACCBIP	US$8.0M
2015	Wellcome Trust	Wellcome Trust's Developing Excellence in Leadership, Training and Science (DELTAS) Africa Initiative	£7.1M
2017	National Institute for Health Research (NIHR)	TIBA (Rapid Impact Project and Making a Difference Project)	£100,000
2017	UK Global Challenges Research Fund (GCRF)	The Crick African Network's African Career Accelerator (CAN ACA)	£1,6M
2019	World Bank Group	Africa Centers of Excellence Impact Project	
