= Navrongo Airport =

Airstrip in Upper East region, Ghana

Paga Airstrip/Airport Paga Airstrip
- IATA: none; ICAO: DGLN

Summary
- Airport type: Public
- Owner: Government
- Serves: Upper East Region, Paga
- Location: Paga
- Elevation AMSL: 690 ft / 210 m
- Coordinates: 10°56′34″N 1°05′14″W

Map

Runways
Direction	Length		Surface
Direction	ft	m	Surface
14/32	4,966	1,514	Unpaved
- Source: Google Maps

Paga Airport/Airstrip (ICAO: DGLN) is an airstrip serving Paga and Navrongo, towns in Kassena-Nankana West District of the Upper East Region of Ghana. The airport was initially constructed to help land soldiers to defend the country's borders in case of attacks.
