= Mirigu Senior High School =

Senior high school in Ghana

- Mirigu, Upper East Region; Ghana

Information
- Type: secondary/high school
- Religious affiliation: All/Mixed
- Established: 2011
- School district: Kassena-Nankana West Municipal
- Head of school: Mr.Atayama Abaa Daniel
- Staff: About 30
- Faculty: Home Economics/General Arts/Agriculture
- Grades: Forms [1-3]
- Enrollment: About 900
- Campus size: Medium
- Nickname: MISCO

Mirigu Senior High School (also known as MISCO) is a public co-educational second-cycle institution located in Mirigu a town in the Kassena Nankana West District in the Upper East Region of Ghana. In 2019, the school took part in the National Science and Maths Quiz organized in the Upper East region and perform creditably.

== History ==
The school was established in December 2011 with 16 students. It had Philip Agamba as its first headmaster. The number of staff then was 12 but current staff strength is forty-two (42) ten (10) non-teaching and thirty-two (32) teaching staff.

== Programmes Offered ==
Mirigu senior high school offers five academic programmes namely;

- General Arts: This program includes subjects such as English, Science, Core Maths, Social Studies, Economics, Government, Geography, History and Elective Mathematics or Elective Literature.
- Agriculture Science
- Home Economics: This program covers subjects like Food and Nutrition, Clothing and Textiles, Management in Living, and General Knowledge in Art
- General science: The science program typically includes subjects like Mathematics, Physics, Chemistry, Biology, and Elective Mathematics
- Business: Business students study subjects like Accounting, Business Management, Economics, Elective Mathematics, and Costing

== Extra-Curriculum Activities ==
=== School Clubs and Societies ===
- Science Club
- Debating Club

== Achievements ==
Records show that students from Mirigu Senior High School perform well in WASSCE examinations and national sports competitions.
