= Bolgatanga Senior High School =

High school in Winkongo, Ghana

Location
- Upper East Region; Winkogo; Ghana
- Coordinates: 10.43°N 0.51°W

Information
- Funding type: GES
- Established: 1970
- School district: Talensi-Nabdam District
- Oversight: Ministry of Education
- Gender: Mixed
- Hours in school day: 8½
- Accreditation: GES/MoE
- School fees: FREE SHS

Bolgatanga Senior High School is a public, co-educational high school located in Winkogo, a town about 8 km south of Bolgatanga, in the Upper East Region of Ghana. The school is within the Talensi District. The school donated a parcel of land for the construction of the Winkogo artificial turf.

== History ==
The school was established in 1970, precisely on the 15 October 1970 with 75 students in Zuarungu on the same campus presently occupied by Zuarungu Senior High School, with Mr. Bayala C.J. Yibrul as its first Headmaster. The number of staff then was eleven in total: three professional teachers and eight supporting staff. As at 2022, the Assistant Headmaster in charge of Administration is Mr Cletus Zoot.

== Programmes offered ==
Bolgatanga Senior High School offers five major academic programmes, namely:

- Business; Business students study subjects like Accounting, Business Management, Economics, Elective Mathematics, and Costing.
- General Arts; This program includes subjects such as English, Science, Core Maths, Social Studies, Economics, Government, Geography, History and Elective Mathematics or Elective Literature.
- Home Economics: This program covers subjects like Food and Nutrition, Clothing and Textiles, Management in Living, and General Knowledge in Art
- Science; The science program typically includes subjects like Mathematics, Physics, Chemistry, Biology, and Elective Mathematics.
- Visual Arts; Students in this program focus on creative subjects like Visual Arts, Sculpture, and Design, in addition to general subjects.

=== Extra-Curriculum Activities ===
==== School Clubs and Societies ====
- Science Club
- Robotics Club

== Achievements ==
Records show that students from Bolgatanga Senior High School perform well in WASSCE examinations and national sports competitions. The school also won the 2016/17 National Health Insurance Scheme Quiz competition.

2016: National Health Insurance Quiz Champions.

== Information ==
- School type: Public Senior High School
- Established: 1970
- School district: Talens District
- Headmaster: Anthony Adimazoya
- Category: A
- Gender: Coeducational (Mixed)
- Accommodation status: Day and Boarding
- Motto: To the Glory of God and the Honour of Ghana
- School Code: 0090403

== Headmasters ==
List of pass Headmasters of Bolgatanga Senior High School:

- Bayala C. J. Yibrul
- Mr. Quansah
- E. K. Daraan
- Mr Francis Avonsige
- Didacus A Afegra
- Ababu Afelibig
- Michael Yeinime Monison
- Afelibeik Ababu
- Anthony Adimazoya

== Discipline ==
The school was forced to temporally closed down following student riots over the death of their colleague student. A committee was set up to investigate the matter.
