= Sirigu, Ghana =

Town in Ghana

Sirigu is a Town in the Upper East Region of Ghana. It is about 800 kilometers from the capital Accra.

It is well known for its basketry, pottery, traditional architecture, and wall paintings.

The people of Sirigu trace their ancestry to Zecco in present-day Burkina Faso. The town is made of five major communities representing the five sons of their ancestor Azuko.

These five communities are Nyangolingo (Anyangale), Gunwoko (Awuah), Basengo (Ase), Wugingo (Awugia) and Bugsongo (Asanga). Sirigu has a market which serves as the central business point for all the five communities, neighbouring towns such as Kandiga, Mirigu, Manyoro, Natugnia, Zorko, Yua and several communities from neighbouring Burkina Faso.

The people of Sirigu has one overlord who oversees to the traditional governance of the land and serves as the administrative head. The chieftaincy belongs to two gates in Gunwoko specifically, the Akumperigibiisi and Apokobiisi clan. The current overlord is Naba Atogumdeya [Bugum Zoti Ko'om Samiisiga Maltinga]Roland Akwara III.However, each sub-community has a divisional chief who forms part of the cabinet of the chief of Sirigu.

Sirigu has many schools but the first of them is the Sirigu Primary School (St.Alex) which was established in 1957 by the Catholic Church which established missionary work in the community in June 1967 by opening a parish. Sirigu is clearly also notable for its orphanage the Mother of Mercy Babies Home, also a handiwork of the Matyrs of Uganda Catholic Church in the area which also runs the Matyrs of Uganda Health Centre, the major health facility in the Sirigu community which serves as a referral centre for the CHPS compounds at Bugsongo, Amutanga and others. The Sirigu Senior High School, SISEC was established in 2000 in a building provided by the Akumpirigebiisi Clan that is now presently serving as the Mother of Mercy Primary School. The school has seen some progress in terms of infrastructure development and performance as well as students in take. Starting out as a day school, it now operate as a both a boarding and day school. Sirigu Women Organization for Poetry and Art is a spotlight in the community and once hosted a sitting UN Secretary General Kofi Annan who paid a visit to the community in 2002. SWOPA has been a tourist hub for many who are art enthusiasts and the beautiful artwork and basketry products made b the women at the centre are a point of attraction for many who troop in to the centre from all over the world. The group was established by notable daughter of the community Madame Melanie Kasise.

== Notable people ==
Sirigu has some notable people who are making valuable contributions to national issues. First among the list is Naba Atogumdeya [ Bugum Zoti Ko'om Samiisiga Maltinga] Roland Akwara III who is the first elite paramount Chief of Sirigu traditional area. Second is Dr. Stephen Ayidia, a native of Bugsongo, one of the sub-communities in Sirigu. Dr.Ayidiya is the first Member of Parliament for the Chiana-Paga constituency in the fourth republic. Roland Agambire is another illustrious son of Sirigu and also hails from Bugsongo. He is the founder and CEO of Agams Holdings, a holding group that is parent to RLG and several other companies. Joining the list is Joseph Awindongo Asakibeem, who is the Kasena Nankana Area Programmes Manager of Afrikids, an NGO he has led to embark on many transformational projects in the community through Afrikids. Mr Asakibeem also comes from Bugsongo. Madame Melanie Kasise, an educationist, is an outstanding daughter of Sirigu and is the brain behind the establishment of SWOPA the art and basketry spotlight of Sirigu. She has received several awards including a National Grand Medal award in recognition of her contributions to regional development in 2007.
