= Chiana =

Chiana may refer to:

- Chiana Valley, or Valdichiana, in Tuscany and Umbria, Italy
- Chiana (river), or Chiani, the river of the Valdichiana, Italy
- Chiana, Iran, or Chianeh, a village in West Azerbaijan Province, Iran
- Chiana, a community in Kassena-Nankana West District, Upper East Region, Ghana
  - Chiana Senior High School, in Chiana, Ghana
- Chiana (Farscape), a fictional character in the TV series Farscape
