= Paga Crocodile Pond =

Pond area in northern Ghana, known for crocodiles

- IUCN category IV (habitat/species management area)
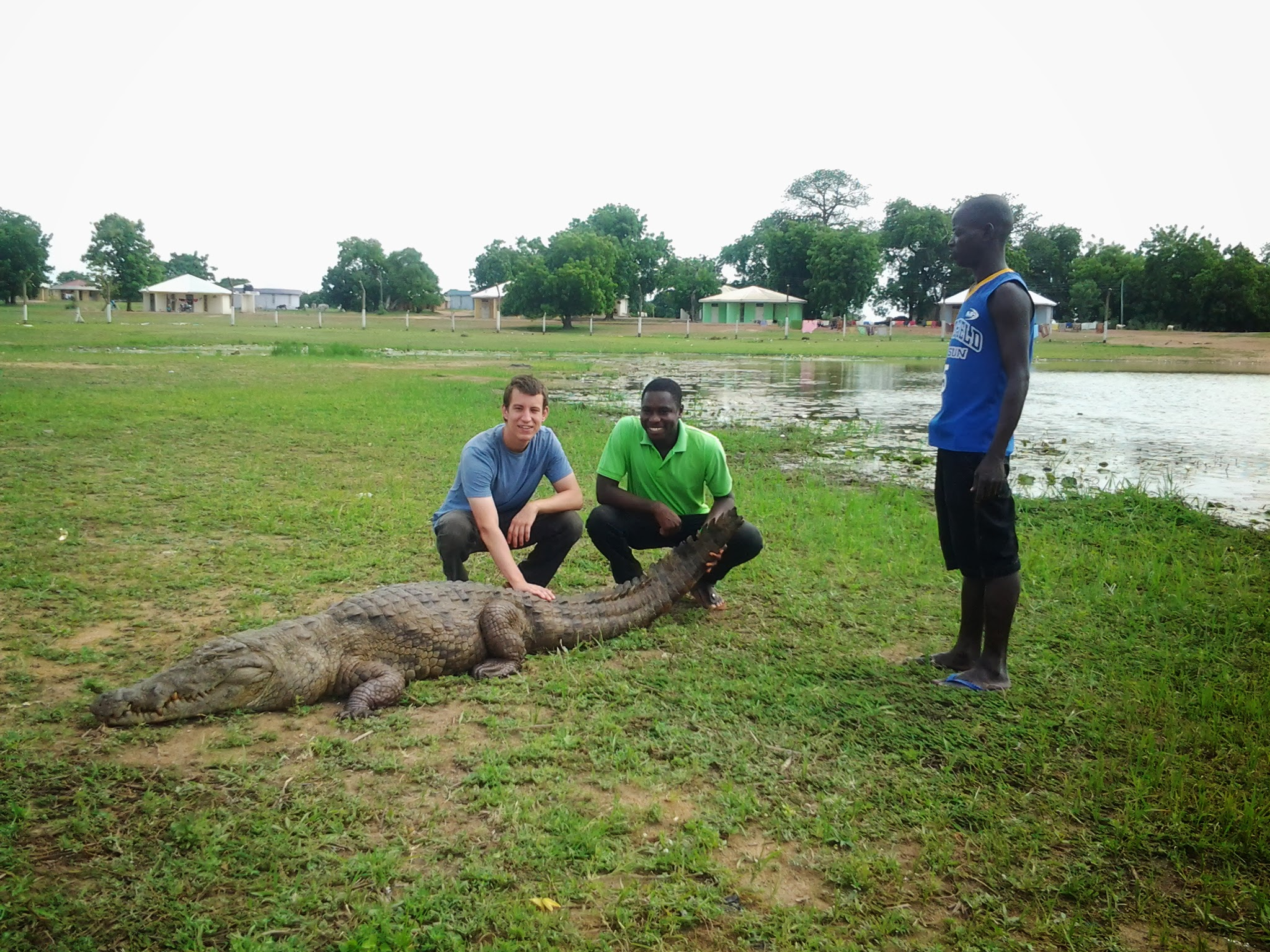
- Visitors touching a crocodile

- Location within Ghana
- Nearest city: Bolgatanga
- Coordinates: 10°59′06″N 1°06′33″W

Paga Crocodile Pond is a sacred pond in Paga in the Upper East Region of Ghana, which is inhabited by West African crocodiles. Due to the friendliness of the reptiles, it has become popular among tourists and the pond is now reliant on tourism to ensure the population of crocodiles remain fed and healthy. It is also known as Chief's pond.

== Description ==
The pond is located in Paga in the Upper East Region of Ghana, and is 44 kilometres (27 mi) outside Bolgatanga, the regional capital. It is inhabited by wild West African crocodiles, with some up to 90 years old. The crocodiles are so tame that local children can swim in the pond alongside them without being harmed. Paga is known to be a trade center for centuries and closer to the Burkina Faso border. During the period of the slave traders in the mid-1800s, the Westerners used Paga as a gateway to the Gulf of Guinea which points from the north.

Though the Paga crocodiles are affable, there are instances where they mistaken humans for animals. Nonetheless, such accidents did not result in casualties in history. Apart from the main crocodile pond that is located in the heartland of the Paga town, there are numerous others in the suburbs.

== Migration ==
The majority of the dams within Paga house at least ten crocodiles, most of which might have migrated from the adjoining communities. The migration usually occurs in the night when the crocs sneak through the bushes into the closest water bodies. Frequently, the crocodiles move between ponds during the vegetation growth—from July to August— that provide them with cover to elude being seeing by humans.

Like the feral crocodiles, mother crocodiles carry their newly hatched offspring in their mouths from the sand banks to the water. The mother crocodiles then provide security to the young ones until they can hunt for themselves.

== Threats to their existence ==
The crocodiles at Paga face an increasing number of challenges that undermine their existence. First, climate change poses a severe predicament to their existence. A growing number of the water bodies dry up in the dry season, leaving the crocs to travel between water bodies all year round. Second, with increasing income levels, urbanization and infrastructural development along the dams, the crocs now have few private spaces. Encroachment of the surrounding dams places a limit on the crocodiles' existence in relation to breeding. Third, hunger poses a menace because the food sources are dwindling. Crocodiles naturally hunt for food in the wild. However, the climate change-induced droughts means their food diversity is reducing. The crocodiles at the Paga Ponds are competing with humans for the remaining fish in the water. In the main pond, they rely mainly on chicken brought by tourists. Moreover, the crocodiles at the countryside do not get the same treatment, thereby leaving them to their fate.

== History ==
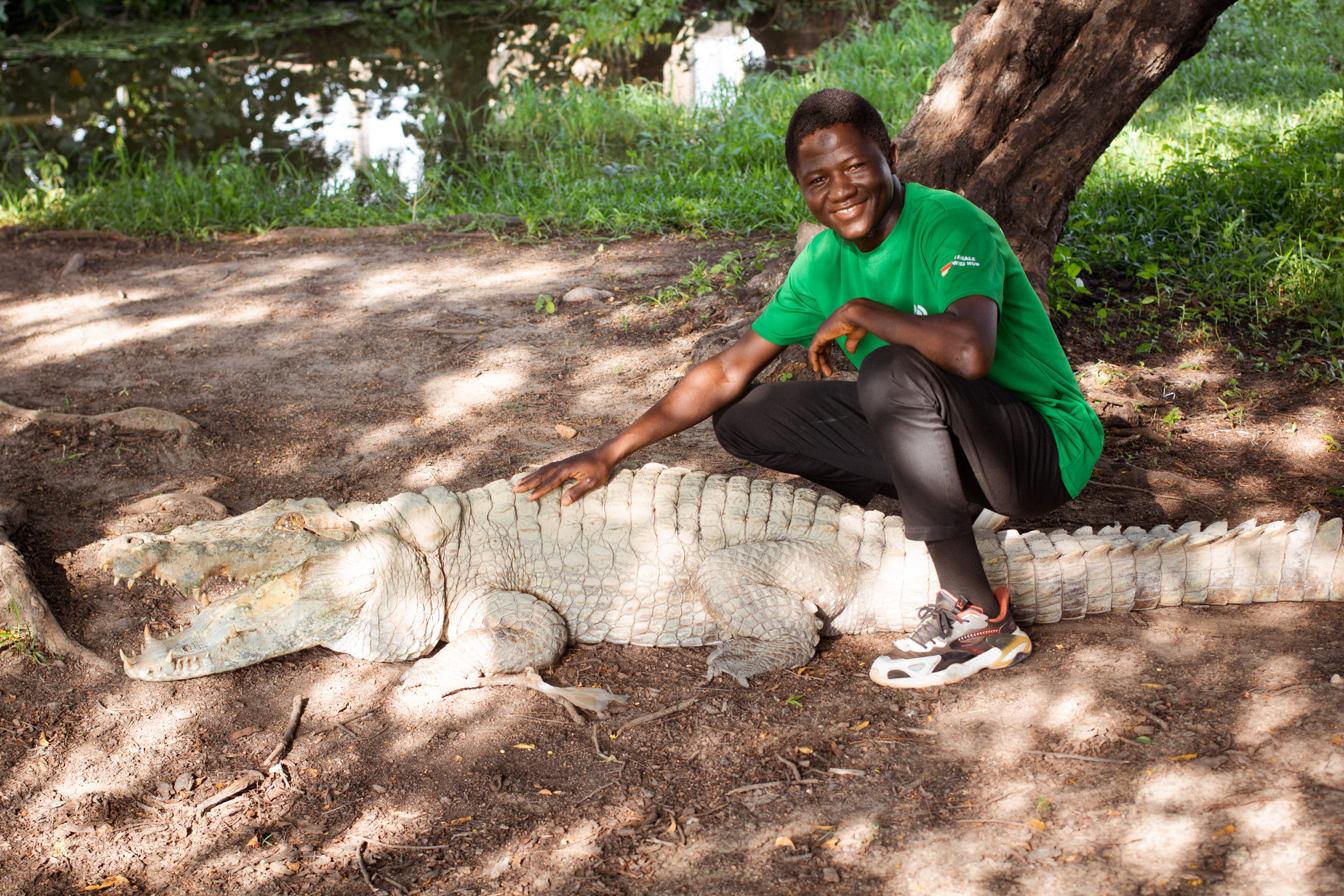
A man tapping on a crocodile at Paga crocodile pond

The locally-told origin of the pond was that a crocodile brought a dying man to the pond to drink, who, after surviving, declared the pond to be sacred and that no harm should come to the crocodiles. This legend of the crocodiles is claimed to date back to about 600 years. The crocodiles are considered to be totems for these local people. Another story states that a man was trapped against the water's edge by a lion, when he bargained with a crocodile that none of his children would harm his kind if he would kill the lion. It is believed that the souls of the people of Paga reside in these crocodiles. It is an offence to kill crocodiles in Paga, or eat crocodile meat.

== Tourism ==
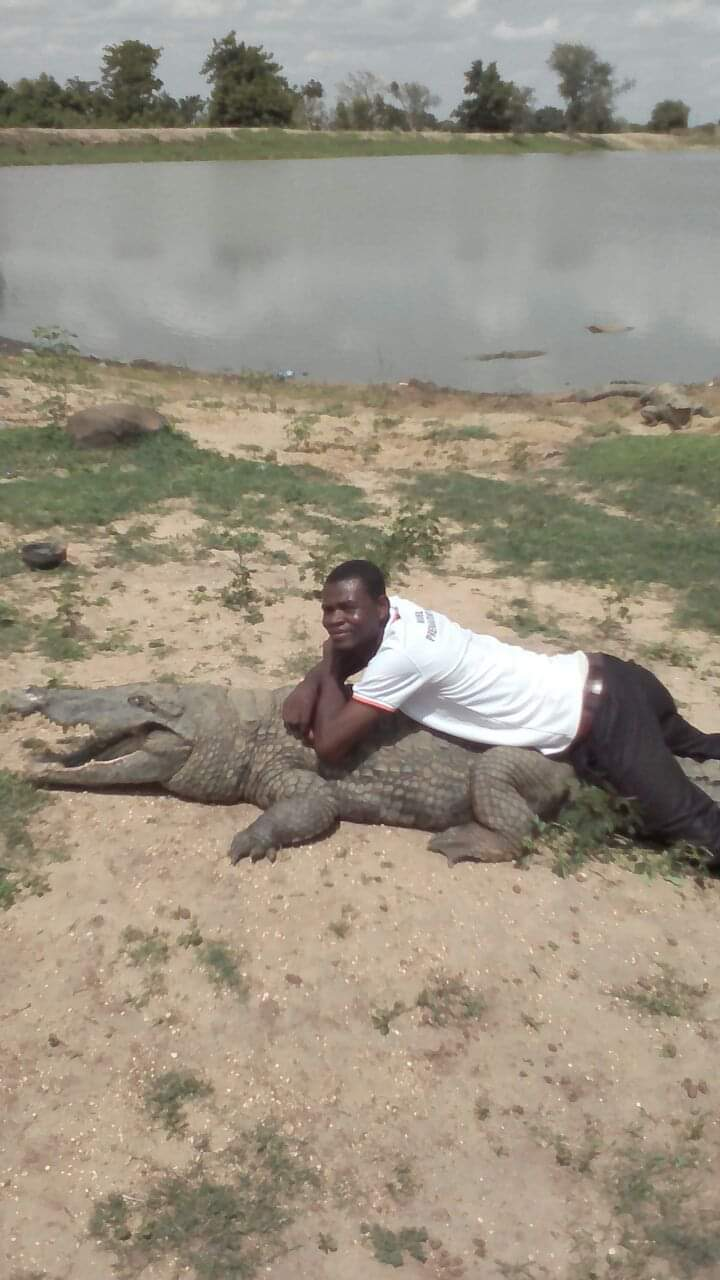
Friendly crocodiles at Zenga, Paga

The crocodiles at Paga are very friendly. Visitors can sit, touch and take photographs with the crocodiles. The crocodiles roam freely throughout the pond, and are brought to the shore when the guides whistle loudly. Tourists can then take photographs while holding the crocodile's tails, after the guide has fed them a chicken. There are concerns that the pond is now too reliant on tourism, with caretaker Salifu Awewozem saying in 2009 that the elderly crocodiles require specialist care, and the only time additional food is provided to the reptiles is when tourists pay for the chickens when they pose for photographs. Tourists use Paga as an opportunity to see preserved slave camps. They also enjoy village tours and evening drumming and dancing by any local cultural group that can be arranged for them.

== Tourists Site in Paga ==
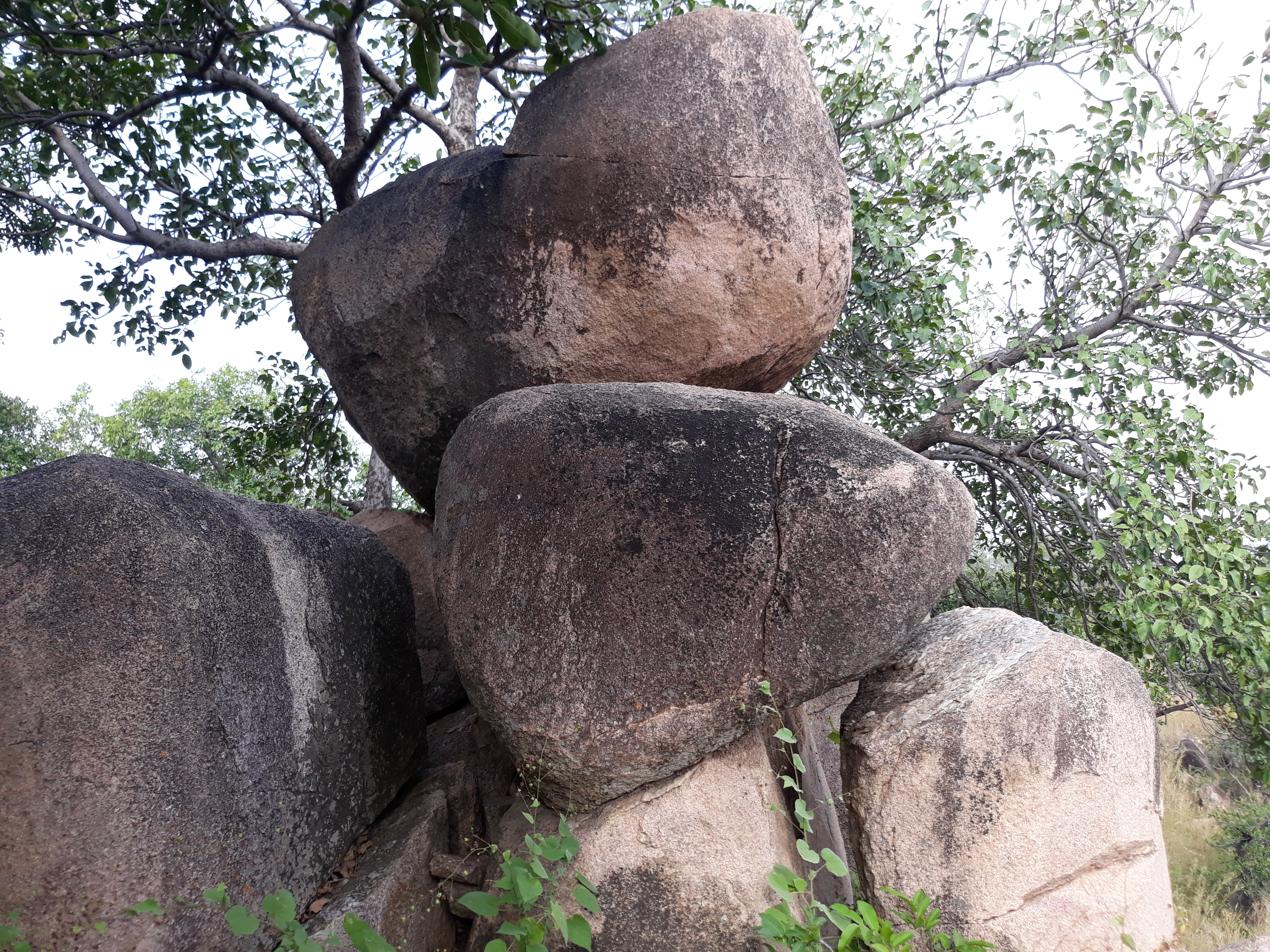
Pikworo Slave Camp

The Pikworo Slave Camp is located in Paga-Nania. It was created purposely for holding slaves that are brought down from the north. Slaves were forced to walk about 150 km to the south to the slave market at Salaga. They are then taken to the coast for shipment.

The mystery dam of Kayoro called Kukula and the Nasaga Game Reserve about 8 km from Burkina Faso and Paga.

== Gallery ==
Crocodiles at the shore of the pond

Feeding a crocodile outside the pond with a live chicken

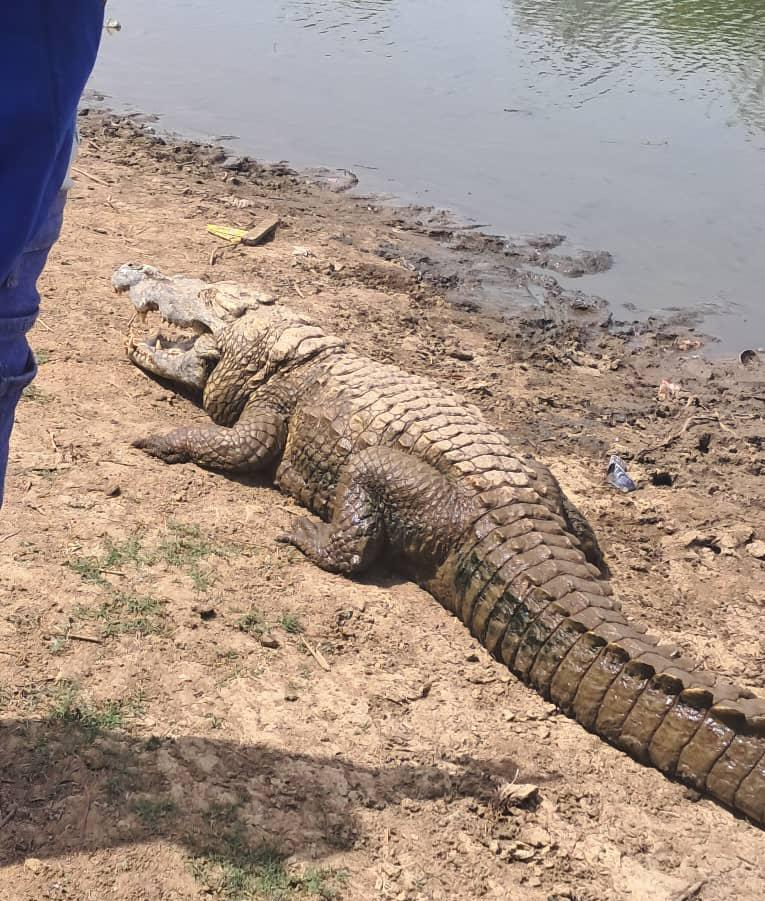
Crocodile by the pond

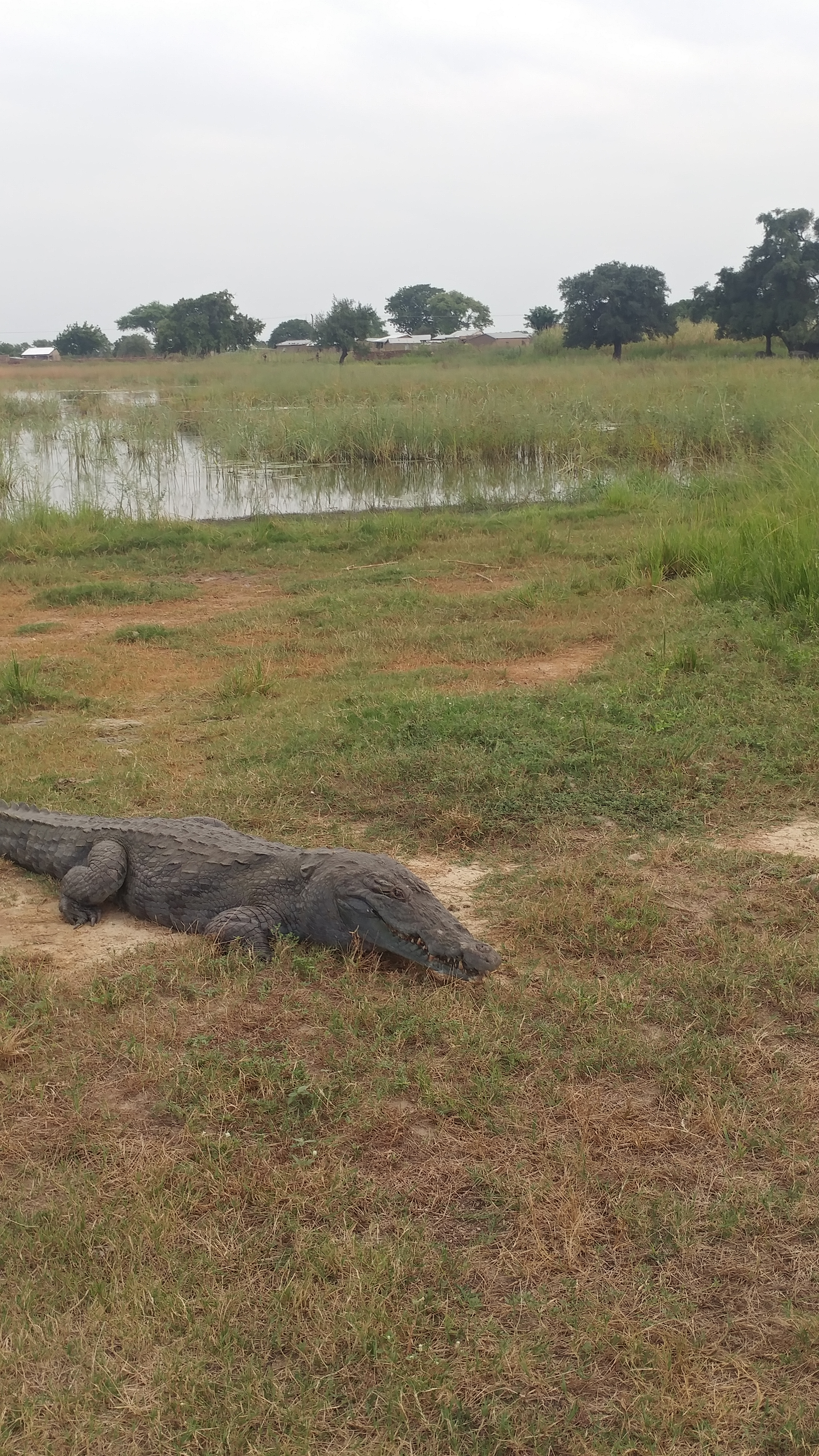
Crocodile on land

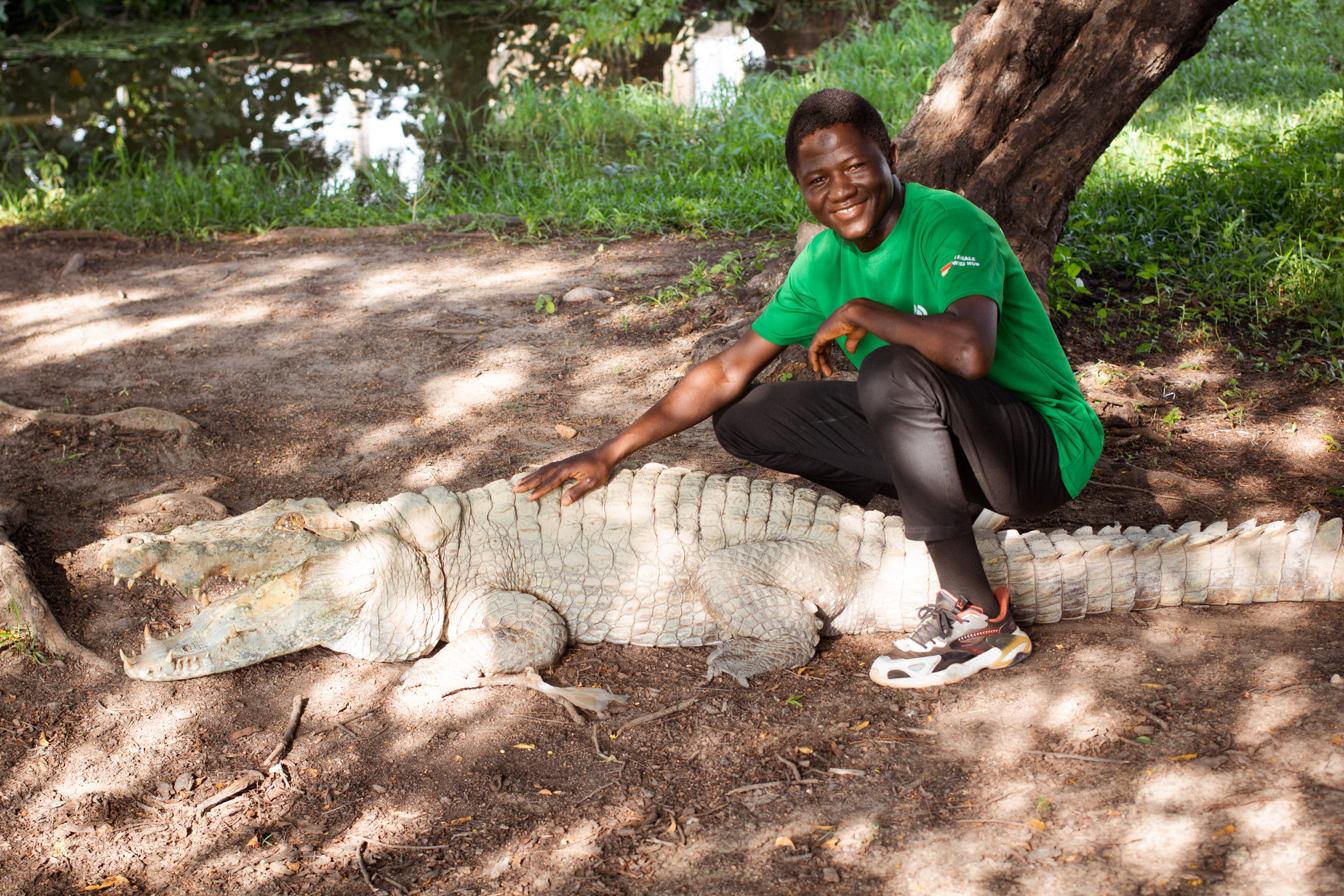
Peaceful human relations with the crocodiles
