= Bongo District =

- District
- Districts of Upper East Region

- Location of Bongo District within Upper East
- Coordinates: 10°54′28″N 0°48′29″W
- Country: Ghana
- Region: Upper East
- Capital: Bongo

Government
  - District Executive: Hon. Rita Atanga

Area
  - Total: 488 km^{2} (188 sq mi)

Population (2021)
  - Total: 120,254
  - Density: 1.83/km^{2} (4.7/sq mi)
- Time zone: UTC+0 (GMT)
- ISO 3166 code: GH-UE-BG
- Website: Official Website

Bongo District is one of the fifteen districts in the Upper East Region, Ghana. Originally created as an ordinary district assembly in 1988, which was established by Legislative Instrument (L.I.) 1446. The district is situated in the central part of the Upper East Region and has Bongo as its capital town.

== Geography and climate ==
=== Geography ===
Bongo District is near the town of Bolgatanga, the Upper East Region's capital. It shares borders with Kassena-Nankana District in the west, the Bolgatanga Municipal District in the south, the Nabdam District to the east and Burkina Faso to the north. The total area is 459 square kilometers.

=== Climate ===
The area is generally flat with occasional outcrops of rocks at an elevation of 200 m. The landscape has little vegetation. The landscape borders on the Sudan Savannah Zone although technically in the Guinea Savannah Zone. The area is in danger of desertification. There is an average of 70 rain days a year, with an annual rainfall of 600–1,400 mm.

== Tourism ==
The Bongo Rocks is a tourism site, which provides a view of the Bongo district landscape and allows an ascent. They have a numbering system that leads to the top. The resonating rocks are hard to find. There are two large rocks of particular interest for hiking or climbing. One of the rocks has a "mushroom" platform on top. The other rock has an underwater cave system, with a Christian cross on top.

Visiting Bongo during the rainy season, gives you an extra attraction to a swelling river connecting to the Vea Dam and Lake. Bongo is also home to Baobab trees. Wildlife includes snakes like boas. There have also been rare sightings of elephants, monkeys and even lions.

== Economy ==
The predominant occupation in Bongo District is subsistence farming along with some handicraft production.

== Healthcare ==
The Bongo District has one District Hospital, One Catholic Health Centre (St. Theresa Health Centre, Zorkor) with 6 health centres located in majoy communities and CHPS compounds throughout the district. There is only one eye care center in the entire district, located at Yorogo which also serves many people across the region and beyond. It was founded by the Presbyterian Church of Ghana and it caters to people from all 3 regions in the northern part of Ghana.

=== Health Centres ===
- Anafobisi Health Centre
- Namoo Health Centre
- Soe Health Centre
- Due Health Centre
- Vea Health Centre
- Kodorongo Health Centre

==== CHAG ====
- St. Theresa's Catholic Health Centre (Zorkor)

==== Private Health Centres ====
- Aloobo International Medical Center (Bongo Namoo)

== Education ==
The Bongo District can boast of Six (6) senior high schools, several junior high and primary schools.

=== List of Senior High Schools ===
- Bongo Senior High School
- Azeem-Namoo Senior High/Technical School
- Gowrie Senior High/Technical School
- Zorkor Senior High School
- Bongo-Soe Senior High School
- Balungu Senior High/Technical

== Demographics ==
Nearly 90 percent of the district's inhabitants speak Gurene.

== Villages ==
- Bongo soe
- Zorko
- Bongo Namoo
- Boko
- Feo
- Vea
- Gowrie
- Ayelbia
- Abokobisi
- Sikabisi
- Balungu
- Yedongo
- Asolgo
- Abelinzanga
- Tangapoore
- Gowrie kunkua
- Anaafubiisi
- Wagelega

== Sources ==
- "Districts of Ghana". Statoids.
- Bongo District Website
- Discover Ghana: Culture & Travel - Experience Ghanas Rich Culture and Warmth Today!
