= FAO (disambiguation) =

FAO, or the Food and Agriculture Organization, is an agency of the United Nations.

FAO may also refer to:

== Places ==
- Fao, Iraq
  - Fao Peninsula
- Fão, Portugal
- Faro Airport, in Portugal, airport code FAO

== Military and insurgents ==
- Al-Fao, an Iraqi artillery system
- Western Armed Forces (French: Forces Armées Occidentales), a Chadian insurgent group
- Fusil ametrallador Oviedo, a Spanish light machine gun

== Professions ==
- Flight Activities Officer, a NASA flight controller
- Foreign area officer of the United States Armed Forces

== Other uses ==
- Fao (god), a god of Niue
- Fao festival, in Ghana
- FAO Schwarz, an American toy retailer
- Faroese language, language code Fao
- Football Association of Odisha, in India
