= Marcus Love Naazii Anafu =

Philanthropist

- Occupations: Volunteer; philanthropist

Marcus Love Naazii Anafu is a Ghanaian philanthropist and volunteer. He is the founder of Love Foundation Club.

== Education ==
He went to Navrongo Senior High School in the Uper East Region of Ghana.

== Career ==
After senior high school, he engaged in philanthropy duties with his colleagues in other to alleviate poverty and streetism among the youth in the community. He started The Love Foundation in 2017. He and his team has visited deprived orphanage such as Jesus Akra, Lilly of the Valley among others. The team were engaged in a project called Street Diaries to engage with homeless people and know their plight. The Love Foundation is supported through members' dues and also donations.

== Achievement ==
He was awarded with The Ambassador Peace Laurel in 2018 by Universal Peace Federation.
