= Gologo festival =

Festival in Ghana by the Talensis

Gologo Festival
- Observed by: Talensi, Tong-zuf
- Significance: Reinforce the community belief in the Nnoo Shrine
- Celebrations: Marks the seasons and the timings for various agricultural activities
- Date: March or early April
- Duration: Three days
- Frequency: once a year

The Gologo festival, also known as the Golib festival, is a pre-harvest festival celebrated in the month of March or early April, at the end of the dry season before the sowing of the early millet. The Gologo Festival is among the major festivals in Ghana and is celebrated by the chiefs and peoples of Tallensi, Tong-Zuf, in the Upper East Region of the country, serving "to reinforce the community belief in the Nnoo shrine or Golib god", which regulates Talensi agricultural life. During the festival, sacrifices are offered to seek protection and ensure plentiful rain and a good harvest in the coming season from the earthly gods.

The festival has a three-day programme at three different villages. The first part takes place at Gorogo, the second at Yinduri, and the final and biggest at Teng-Zug (Tong-Zuf). Libation is poured at the Teng-Zug shrine to thank the gods for a successful occasion. Traditional songs are composed by the elders of each community for the occasion and people dance to the composed songs. During this period, noise-making is prohibited and no one mourns their dead. Tengzug, Santeng, Wakii, Gbeogo, Yinduri/Zandoya, Shia, Gorogo and Spart are the communities which celebrate the festival.

== Dress ==
Participants observe a strict compliance to the wearing of certain kind of costume. Men wear a short knicker and a towel on the chest.

== Preparation ==
In February, new songs are learnt in preparation for the celebration, and new costumes and accessories are procured or prepared.

== Celebrations ==
The date of the celebration depends on the appearance of the third moon in each year, which occurs in March or early April. On the first day the moon is spotted, the Chief and the Tindaanas don traditional regalia meant for the celebration. People in the community begin observing dress customs the following day. Community members remove all clothing covering the upper part of the body, remove all trousers (wearing only boxer shorts, pants, or shorts which have no pockets on them), or wear kpalang or kpalang peto. This dress code is observed for one month.

During the festival, no noise-making is permitted, including crying for the dead, roofing houses, or playing loud music.

The communities then begin series of mini festival rites in the towns that surround the Tongo Hills which include dancing and merry making. On the 16th day after the removal of dresses, all the communities congregate at Tengzug for the final festival celebrations.

== Relevance ==
It is celebrated to ensure “success in all food getting enterprises, security from danger, disease and death," and, according to Joffroy (2005), to reinforce the belief of the people of the community in the shrine.
