= Ndaakoya festival =

Festival in Ghana by the Frafras

Ndaakoya Festival is a festival celebrated by the Frafra, Talensi, and Nabdan speaking communities in the Upper East Region Of Ghana. It is usually celebrated in the early months of every new year (January and February) to thank God for a successful harvest during the farming season.

== History ==
The word Ndaakoya comes from two Frafra words: Ndaa meaning "during that time" or "days", and Koya meaning "I have farmed" or "farming". And so it follows that the word Ndaakoya means "during that time I farmed". The Ndaakoya festival is the main festival celebrated by the Frafra, Talensi and the Nabdan communities in the Upper East Region. Together, these groups of people form the majority of the population of the region. The celebration of the festival is an inherited ritual performed by these tribes to appease the gods of their land by thanking them for a good harvest. Their forefathers believed that good yields during harvest, the provision of rain, sunshine and other factors necessary for stimulating good harvest was the handiwork of the gods they served and hence needed to thank the gods for a wonderful harvest.

It is a peaceful celebration which also sought to foster unity among the people. Its celebration always sees different people, from all corners of the region, trooping in to witness the wonderful displays of culture, music and dance. Even though the festival is celebrated every year by the Bolga Chief (known as Bolga Naaba), every household is expected to celebrate this festival annually in their own way for the same purpose. Apart from the display of music and dance that takes place during the celebration of the festival, libation is poured, food prepared and drinks served for merry-making. Influential people are also invited from all areas of the region and other regions to come and observe the celebration of the festival. Pito the popular "local beer" of the region is commonly served during the celebration. This is prepared using part of the gains made during harvest. It is prepared using guinea corn or what has become known as "red millet". This is brought by individuals from their homes as a token for appeasing the gods.
