= Doba, Ghana =

Community in Upper East Region, Ghana

Doba
- Location in Ghana
- Coordinates: 10°52′01″N 1°02′24″W
- Country: Ghana
- Region: Upper East Region
- District: Kassena Nankana Municipal District

Doba is a community in the Kassena Nankana Municipal District in the Upper East Region of Ghana.
