= Whispering Rocks and Shrines of Tongo =

Locations in Ghana

Whispering rocks and Shrines of Tongo is found in Tengzug village, Ghana. The Rocks are famous for its arrangement where one rock comfortably sits on another. The rocks are also known for making strange whistling sounds in November and December of every year.

== History ==
The Tengzug Shrine was once a hideout for slaves evading their captors. Now, it is used more traditionally for religious animal sacrifices for good luck and to please the ancestors of the Talensis.

== Shrine ==
The shrine is considered to be a resting place for the ancestors of the people of Talensis hence tourists are supposed to remove their shirts before entering the shrine. Once inside, sacrifices are made to the gods.

== The Whispering Rocks ==
The rocks make whistling sounds when hit by another stone during the Harmattan season in November and December.
