= Tengana Festival =

Festival in Ghana by the Tongo people

Tengana Festival is an annual festival celebrated by the chiefs and people of Tongo Traditional Area. It comprises Balungu, Winkongo and Pwalugu in the Upper East Region of Ghana. It is also a festival of the Talensis. It is celebrated in January.

== Celebrations ==
During the festival, there is traditional music and dancing whiles there is also general merry-making.

== Significance ==
This festival is a thanksgiving festival.
