= Kassena-Nankana West District =

District in Upper East region, Ghana

- District
- Districts of Upper East Region

- Location of Kassena-Nankana West District within Upper East
- Coordinates: 10°59′32″N 01°06′48″W
- Country: Ghana
- Region: Upper East
- Capital: Paga

Government
  - District Executive: Hon. George Nonterah

Area
  - Total: 1,004 km^{2} (388 sq mi)

Population (2021)
  - Total: 90,735
- Time zone: UTC+0 (GMT)
- ISO 3166 code: GH-UE-KW

Kassena-Nankana West District is one of the fifteen districts in Upper East Region, Ghana. Originally, it was formerly part of the then-larger Kassena-Nankana District in 1988, until the western part of the district was split off to create Kassena-Nankana West District on 29 February 2008; thus the remaining part has been renamed as Kassena-Nankana East District (which it was later elevated to municipal assembly status on 28 June 2012 to become Kassena-Nankana Municipal District). The district assembly is located in the western part of Upper East Region and has Paga as its capital town.

== 1.1 Background ==
The paramount aim of creating this Assembly was to bring the business of governance to the doorsteps of the ordinary Ghanaian. It is located approximately between latitude 10.97° North and longitude 01.10° West. The district has a total land area of approximately 1,004 km^{2}. The Kassena-Nankana West District shares boundaries with Burkina Faso to the north, Bongo District to the north-east, Bolgatanga Municipal to east, Kassena-Nankana Municipal to the south, Bulsa District to the south-west and Sissala East District to the west.

== 1.2 Physical Features ==
=== 1.2.1 Relief and drainage ===
The district is underlain mainly by Birrimian and Granitic rock formation. The relief of the district is generally low lying and undulating with isolated hills rising up to 300 meters above sea level in the western part of the district. Notably among these hills are Fie (9280 metres above sea level), Busono 350 metres, and Zambao 360 metres. The district is mainly drained by the Sissili River and its tributaries. There are however some few dug-outs and ponds, which are used for livestock rearing, crop production and domestic purposes.

=== 1.2.2 Climate ===
The Kassena-Nankana West District falls within the interior continental climatic zone of the country characterized by pronounced dry and wet seasons. The two seasons are influenced by two air masses. First is the warm, dusty and dry harmattan air mass, which blows in the north easterly direction across the whole district from the Sahara desert. During its period of influence (late November – early March), rainfall is entirely absent, vapour pressure is very low (less than 10mb) and relative humidity rarely exceeds 20.0% during the day but may rise to 60.0% during the nights and early mornings. Temperatures are usually modest at this time of the year by tropical standards (26 °C – 28 °C). May to October is the wet season. During this period, the whole of West African sub-region including Kassena-Nankana West District is under the influence of a deep tropical maritime air mass. This air mass together with rising convention currents provides the district with rains. The total rainfall averages 950 mm per annum. The above phenomenon adversely affects the water table and reduces underground water. Water harvesting is probably a viable option in the district. 2 Figure 1.1: Map of Kassena Nankana West District Source: Ghana Statistical Service, 2010 Population and Housing Census

=== 1.2.3 Vegetation ===
The vegetation is mainly of Sahel Savannah type consisting of open savannah with fire swept grassland separating deciduous trees among which may be seen a few broad-leafed and fireleached tree species. Some of the most densely vegetated parts of this district can be found along river basins and forest reserves. Examples are the Sissili and Asibelika basins. Most of these trees in the forested areas shed their leaves during the dry season. The human activities over the years have also affected the original vegetation considerably. Common trees which are also of economic importance include Dawadawa, Sheanut, Baobab, Nim and Mango. The low vegetation cover of the area hampers sufficient rainfall thereby reducing underground water supply.

=== 1.2.4 Soil ===
Two main soil types can be found in the district. These soil types are the Savannah Ochrosols and the ground water laterite. The northern and eastern parts of the district are covered by the Savannah Ochrosols, while the rest of the district is characterized by ground water laterite. The Savannah Ochrosols are porous, well drained, loamy, mild acidity and interspersed with patches of black or dark grey clay soils. This soil type is suitable for cultivation of cereals and legumes. The ground water laterites are developed over shale and granite. Due to the underlying rock type, they become water logged during the rainy season and dry up during the dry season, thus causing cemented layers of iron-stone which make cultivation difficult. This would probably have contributed significantly to food insecurity in the district.

== 1.3 Political Administration ==
The Assembly has a total membership of 68 people made up of 46 elected members, 20 appointed members, the ex-officio members being the 1 Member of Parliament and the District Chief Executive. The present Assembly has ten female members, 4 of whom are elected and 6 appointed. There are 11 Area Councils in the district which include the Chiana Town Council, Mirigu, Sirigu, Kandiga, Kayoro, Katiu, Nakong, Batiu, Paga, Nabango and Kejelo Area Councils. Administrative set up Administratively, the district is divided into 3 zones namely the North, East and West Zones. The District Assembly has the following departments in place and functioning under the District Co-ordinating Director. The District Directorate of Health Service, The Ghana Education Service (GES), Department of Community Development, Birth and Deaths Registry, District Environmental Health Unit, Department of Agriculture. The following national agencies which do not form part of the Departments of the Assembly are also in place: The National Service Secretariat, The NCCE, The Immigration Service, The CEPS, The Police Service. The other key decentralized departments which are yet to be established in the District include the following: Department of Town and Country Planning, Information Service Department, Department of Parks and Gardens. Other important national agencies that are crucial but not yet established in the district are: The Fire Service, The Statistical Service Department, Survey Department, The Forestry Commission, Commission on Human Rights and Administrative Justice (CHRAJ), The Land Valuation Board 4 Committees of the assembly The following committees have been constituted and are operational as part of the political and administrative machinery of the district. The executive committee (which is supported by the following sub-committees): Finance and Administration, Works, Justice and Security, Development Planning, Health and Environment, Education, Agriculture, Women and Children. The other committees in the district are: District HIV/AIDS Committee, District Security Council, District Tender Committee, District Tender Review Board, Audit Report Implementation Committee, and District Budget Committee.

== 1.4 Social and cultural structure ==
=== 1.4.1 Traditional set-up ===
There are seven paramountcies in the Kassena Nankana West District, namely, Paga, Chiana, Katiu, Nakong, Kayoro, Mirigu, and Sirigu. Every paramountcy has at least one ‘Tindana’ who acts as the chief priest and relates with the ancestral traditions which he holds in trust for the people. Sirigu has six Tindana. Matters concerning chieftaincy, culture, and tradition are handled by the various traditional council's and the individual chiefs.

=== 1.4.2 Ethnicity ===
The predominant tribes in the district are the Kassena and the Nankana and Mamprusis. Minor ethnic groups include Kantosi, Moshie, Builsa, Zambrama and few migrant workers from Burkina-Faso. These tribes have co-existed over the years, enhancing the development of the district. Despite the varied ethnic composition of the district, the society is generally patrilineal and traditionally male-dominated. Women are generally less involved in decision making and are traditionally responsible for the bulk of household activities such as cooking, fetching of water and caring for the children as well as other farming activities such as planting, weeding, harvesting and are also more involved in other commercial activities such as buying and selling.

=== 1.4.3 Religious composition ===
The major religious denominations are Christians, Muslims, and Traditionalist. The traditionalists are mostly found in the rural parts of the district. Their spiritual roles contribute to enhancing peace and development in the district.

=== 1.4.4 Festivals ===
Festivals are significant practices in the district. The Fao Festival is the predominant in Paga Traditional Area. This festival is celebrated to thank the gods for a bumper harvest. Another post-harvest festival is Gakwea which is also celebrated to give reverence and thanks to the gods for a bumper harvest which has implication for food security in the district. The Keposiga and Mokeeka festivals are also celebrated by the people of Sirigu and Kandiga. The festivals celebrated in the district strengthen the traditional family unions and systems of the people.

=== 1.4.5 Marriage ===
The traditional marriage system entails a distinctive practice or payment of bride price, a system where the family of the bridegroom meets some marriage expenses including cola nuts, tobacco and guinea fowls. The bridegroom apart from the above items pays seven sheep and a cow. In the event of the bridegroom's inability to pay the initial sheep and cow, the children would be mandated to settle their father's indebtedness before they can dowry their wives. The above arrangement ensures strengthened ties between families and ensures security of marriages.

=== 1.4.6 Inheritance ===
The patrilineal system of inheritance is practised. The eldest son inherits the deceased father in trust of the family. There is no form of ownership of family assets by daughters within the traditional system. Inheritance in the district invariably denies women access to productive resources including land.

=== 1.4.7 Funerals ===
Funerals have become expensive in the way they are performed these days in the district due to show of real wealth and competition. The practice of funeral rites and other associated customary practices is another emerging issue affecting the welfare of the living standards of several families and individuals. The performance of funerals has of late been quite a source of worry and economic hardships to several families. Funerals are mostly organized after the harvest.

=== 1.4.8 Land title and ownership ===
Individuals do not own lands but rather the family heads take care of the land on behalf of members. The chiefs oversee the distribution and sale of land. The Tidanas/Tigatus are the original owners of the land; however they transfer land to other family heads.

== 1.5 Economy ==
=== 1.5.1 Agriculture ===
Agriculture is the dominant economic activity in the district. The sector employs over 68.7% of the people. Male farmers’ population stands at 33,307 (48.4%) and female farmers 35,509 (51.6%). The major crops grown are millet, sorghum, rice, groundnuts, leafy vegetables, cowpea, bambara beans, okro, cotton, tomatoes and onion. Livestock reared in the district include cattle, sheep, goats, pigs, guinea fowls, fowls and other domestic animals like donkeys. Fish farming involving Tilapia and Mudfish is quite significant. Farm sizes are quite small and yields are very low as compared to other parts of the country due in part to poor soils and unreliable rainfall. There are few dams and dugouts which are being used for dry season farming. This has implications for food insecurity.

=== 1.5.2 Commerce ===
Trading and commercial activities in the district revolve mainly around foodstuff, semiprocessed food, crafts and livestock These commodities are sold in the local markets and outside the district. Markets have 3-day except Chiana aht has a 6-day market cycles. Markets play a very important role in the local economy. Commodities traded in range from foodstuffs and livestock to manufactured goods. The main markets are Chiana, Paga, Sirigu, Kandiga, Mirigu, Katiu, Nakong and Kayoro.

=== 1.5.3 Manufacturing ===
The Kassena-Nankana West District has no large scale manufacturing industries. It is characterized by small scale food processing, craft and manufacturing industries. Examples include smock weaving, pottery and blacksmithing.

=== 1.5.4 Agro industry/processing ===
Processing of foodstuff, cash crops and goods are common features of the local economy. The major small scale industrial activities include sheabutter extraction, pito brewing, milling or grinding of millet for domestic use, dawadawa processing, weaving and dressmaking, pottery, rice milling and soap making. No. Business type No. Location 1 Hairdressers 70 District wide 2 Tailors and dress makers 75 District wide 3 Bakers 9 Paga 4 Sheabutter extractors 92 Nakolo, Kalvio 5 Bee keepers 25 Nakong 6 Soap makers 120 Paga, Nabango, Chiana, Kalvio 7 Guinea fowl rearers 75 Chiana, Nakolo, Nakong 8 Smock weavers 17 Nabango, Paga Central 9 Batik tie and dye 30 Paga, Nakolo

Source: Ghana Statistical Service, 2010 Population and Housing Census Most of these small scale industries are one-man or one woman businesses and hardly employ people. The sector is dominated by females who need to be organized into groups and their capacities built to enhance their businesses. There are also varied business types in the district which need to be developed in order to boost the local economy.

=== 1.5.5 Banking and financial services ===
The district has one banking institution, the Naara Rural Bank Limited located in Paga with branches at Navrongo, Chiana and Sirigu. There are also non-banking institutions in the district which collaborate with the financial institutions to offer credit to groups and individuals. Such institutions include Non-governmental Organizations, Community Based Rural Development Project and National Board for Small Scale Industries. In addition, non-formal credit arrangements such as "Susu" are available for traders and small-scale producers.

=== 1.5.6 Hospitality industry ===
The following are a list of hospitality facilities which complement the tourist industry in the district. They include Kubs lodge, the CEPS Canteen, Black heritage, More Hope Enterprise and several other pito bars. However, most of these facilities need to be developed in order to attract more users which would in turn boost the private sector in the district.

=== 1.5.7 Unemployment and underemployment ===
The level of unemployment is very high in the district especially among the youth. Agriculture pursuits dominate the employment scene. Over 70.0 percent of the active 7 population is into agriculture and the unemployment situation is worse during the prolonged dry season when no farming activity can take place. Dry season gardening is practised only in communities where there are small-scale dams. This invariably compels most of the youth to migrate to the southern part of the country in search of jobs. Other areas that offer employment opportunities to the people include the public services, retail trade, food processing, pottery and other agro-based processing. The above characteristics do affect the growth and expansion of the district's economy.

=== 1.5.8 Tourism ===
There are quite a large number of tourist attractions in the district including the Paga Sacred Crocodile Ponds, the Zenga Pond, Pikworo Slave camp, a Pottery Art Centre at Sirigu which are operational. The other tourist sites such as the Caves at Chiana, the sacred pythons at Kayoro, and the remains of the Catholic Church at Kayoro need to be developed. There is therefore the need for the district assembly to attract investors into the tourism area of the district.

== Sources ==
- "Districts of Ghana". Statoids.
- GhanaDistricts.com
