= Fao festival =

Festival in Ghana by the people in Navrongo

The Fao festival is an annual harvest festival celebrated by the chiefs and peoples of Navrongo in the Upper East Region of Ghana. The festival is celebrated in the month of January every year. It is observed by communities within the Kassena-Nankana Traditional Area to give thanks to the gods for protecting the people throughout the farming season and for granting a bountiful harvest. The festival also serves as an occasion to promote the cultural heritage of the people, strentgten community unity, and bring together natives of the area for social and development activities.

== Significance ==
The festival is celebrated to mark the successful end of the farming season, bountiful harvest and thank God, the gods and the ancestors. The festival also serves to preserve and promote the cultural heritage of the Kassena-Nankana people through traditional music, dance and other customary rites. It provides an opportunity for natives of the area to reunite, strengthen community bonds and discus initiatives aimed at the socio-economic development of the traditional area.

== Celebration ==
The FAO festival features traditional activities that reflect the cultural practices of the people of Navrongo. The celebration includes a gathering of chiefs and community members, where traditional leaders participate in a durbar. The even is accompanied by traditional drumming, dancing and cultural performances.

During the festival, participants display aspects of the local culture through traditional clothings, music, and other form of indigenous expressions. The occasion also attracts natives living outside the community and visitors who take part in the celebration.
