= Tongo Hills =

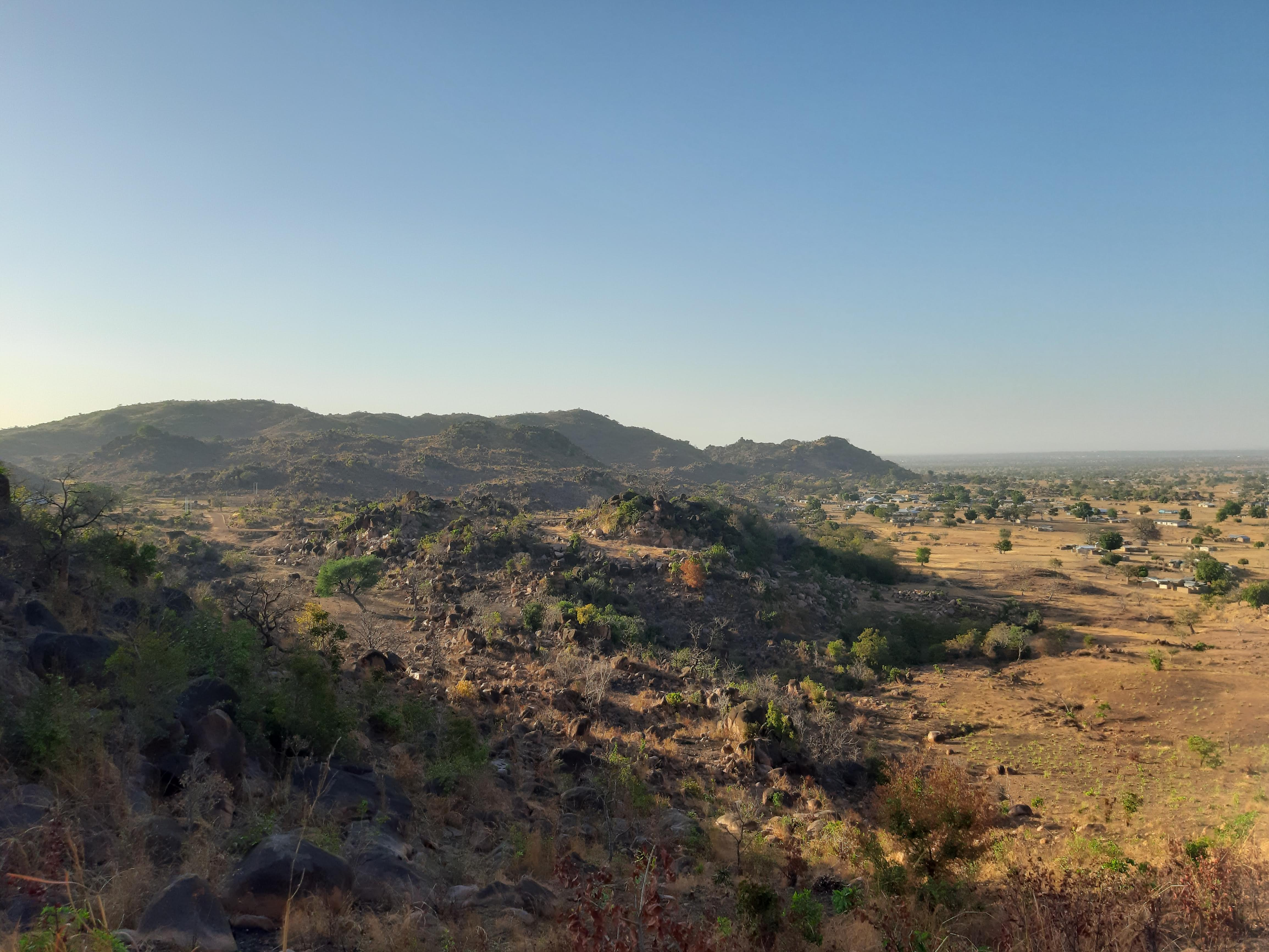
- View into the valley of the Tongo Hills

Highest point
- Elevation: 355 m (1,165 ft)
- Coordinates: 10°40′N 0°48′W

Dimensions
- Length: 6 km (3.7 mi)
- Area: 15.8 km^{2} (6.1 mi^{2})

Geography
- Country: Ghana
- Region: Upper East Region

The Tongo Hills is a group of mountains located south of Tongo, Ghana. The hills are located in the Ghanaian Northern Plains.

The Tongo Hills is a dramatic granite mountain range with unique rock formations, deep spiritual significance, and the holy Tengzug Shrines.

== Hiking At Tongo Hills ==
A group of young people do hike the Tongo Hills every year. The Atogfai Hiking group has been hiking the Tongo Hills for about 10 years now.

Young people go into the caves, climb the highest hills and pass through challenging rocks to enjoy the excitement that comes with endurance.

== Gallery ==
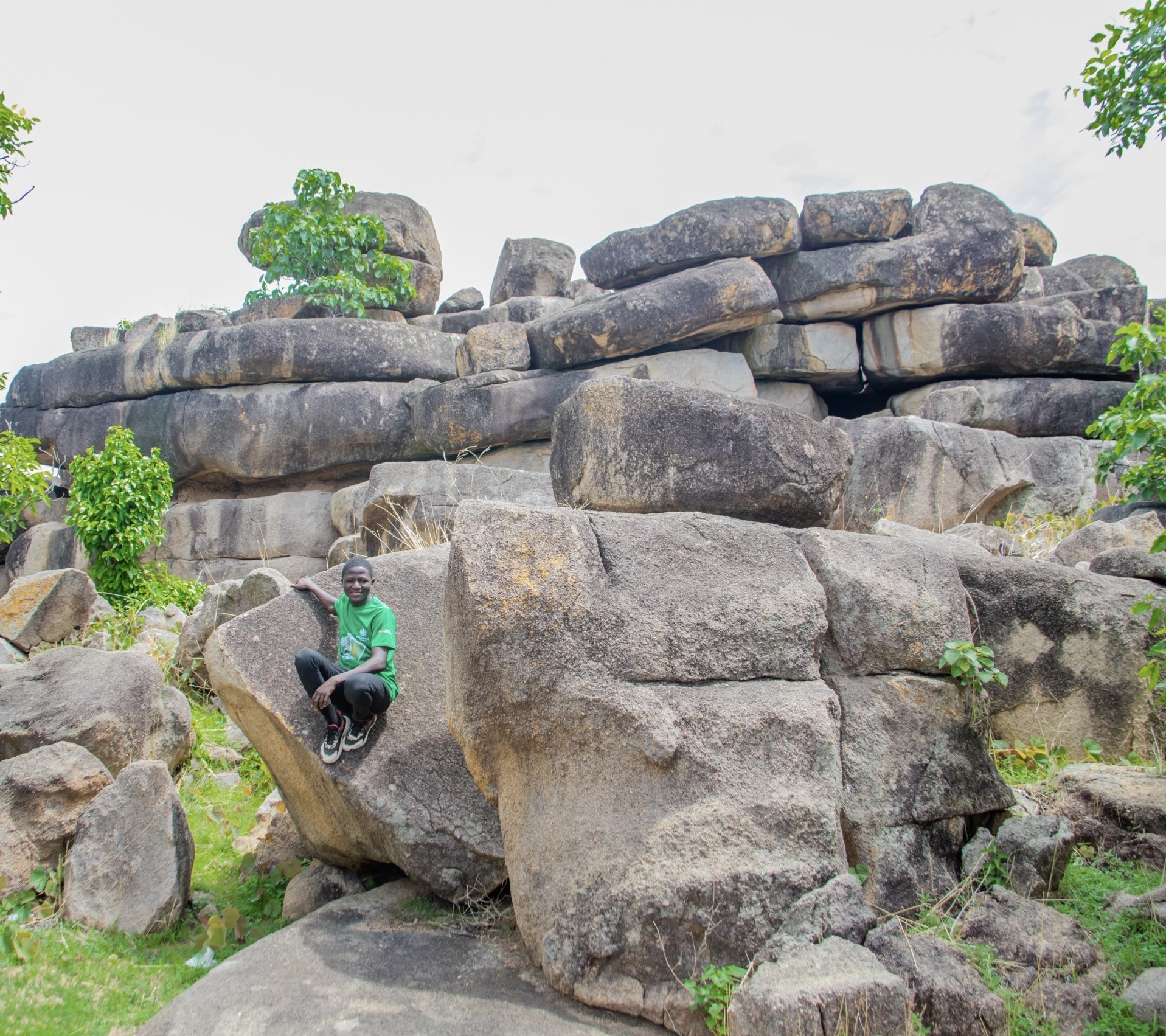
Naturally packed rocks at Tongo Hills

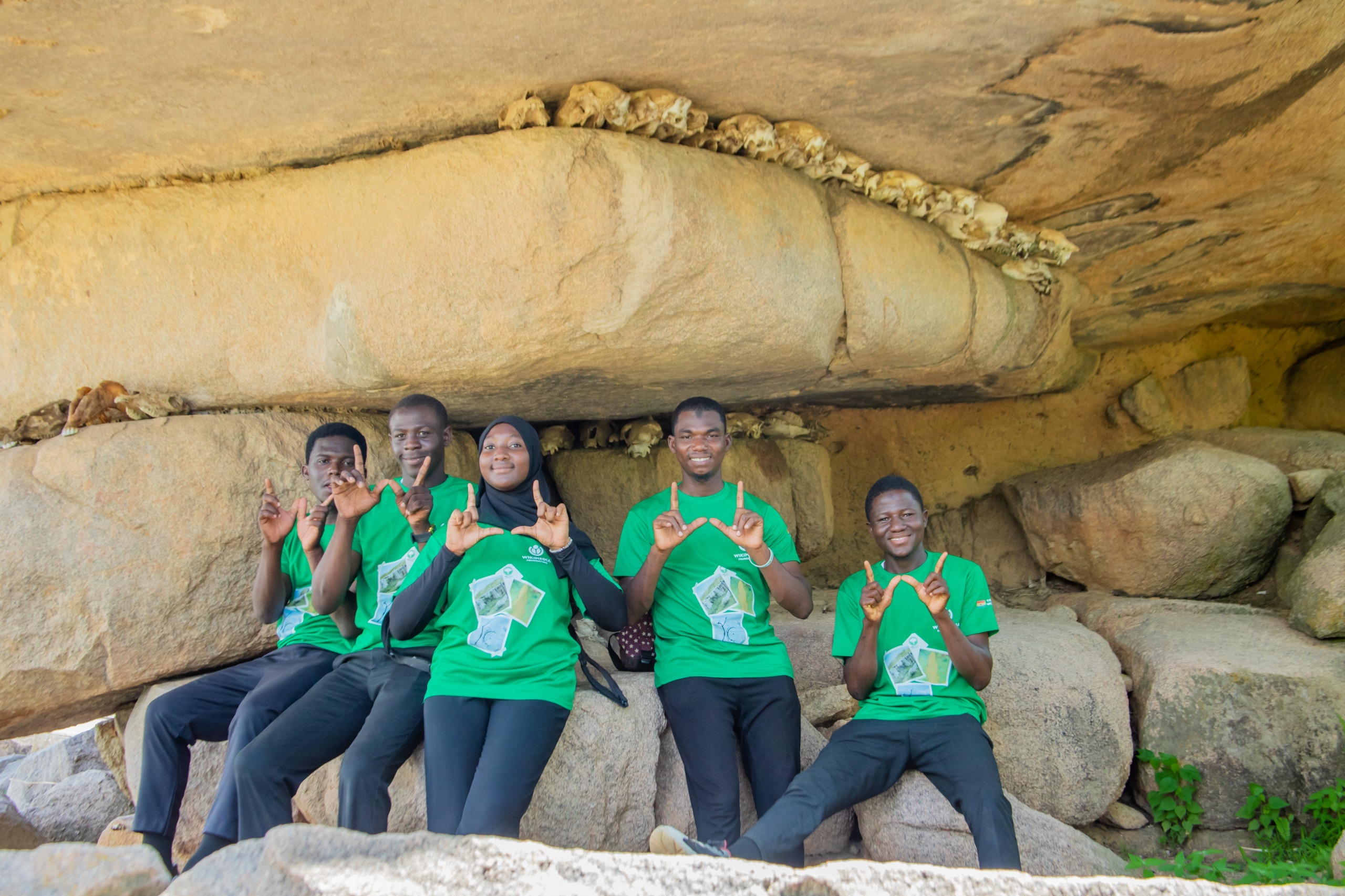
Cave at Tongo Hills
