= Bongo, Ghana =

Bongo
- District Capital
- Location of Bongo in Upper East region
- Coordinates: 10°54′32″N 0°48′28″W
- Country: Ghana
- Region: Upper East Region
- District: Bongo District
- Elevation: 720 ft (220 m)

Population (2013)
  - Total: —
- Time zone: GMT
  - Summer (DST): GMT

Bongo is a small town and is the capital of Bongo district, a district in the Upper East Region of north Ghana, adjacent to the border with Burkina Faso.
