= Kandiga =

Community in Upper East Region, Ghana

- Location in Ghana
- Coordinates: 10°53′53″N 0°57′45″W
- Country: Ghana
- Region: Upper East Region
- District: Kassena Nankana Municipal District

Kandiga is a community in the Kassena Nankana Municipal District in the Upper East Region of Ghana.

== Institution ==
- Kandiga Community Senior High School

== Notable native ==
- Gordon Awandare
