= Telania =

Town in Northern Ghana

Coordinates: 10°50′N 1°04′W

Telania is an indigenous town in Navrongo, Northern Ghana. The natives inhabited the area before the arrival of the other surrounding towns in the municipality.

It is believed the ancestor of the Telania's first lived in a sacred hole in the ground and later commanded his people to move out of the hole and stay on the surface as seen today.

The Telanias are the landholders(Tega-tiina) and leases portions to the abutting communities. The natives have rich culture.
