= Kuure Festival =

Festival in Ghana by the Zaare people in Upper East region

Kuure Festival is an annual festival celebrated by the chiefs and people of Zaare in the Upper East Region of Ghana who are mostly blacksmiths. It is usually celebrated in the months of January and February.

== Celebrations ==
During the festival, there are sacrifices made and then followed by dancing and drumming.

== Significance ==
The festival is celebrated to symbolize the 'Kuure' which means hoe in the Gurune language. The hoe is the main tool for farming in their community and that means it is their livelihood.
