= Chiana Senior High School =

Mixed second cycle institution in Chiana, Ghana

Coordinates: 10.849°N 1.271°W

- Chiana, Upper East Region; Ghana

Information
- Type: secondary/high school
- Established: 1991 (35 years ago)
- Grades: Forms [1-3]
- Nickname: CHIANASCO

Chiana Senior High School (CHIANASCO) is a mixed second-cycle institution located in Chiana in the Kassena-Nankana West District in the Upper East Region of Ghana.

== History ==
The school was established on 1 January 1991. In 2017, the headmistress of the school was Mrs. Margaret Bobi. The population of the school in 2017 was 1,434 students. In 2022, the headmistress of the school is Ivy Betur Naaso.
