= Kassena-Nankana District =

- Former District
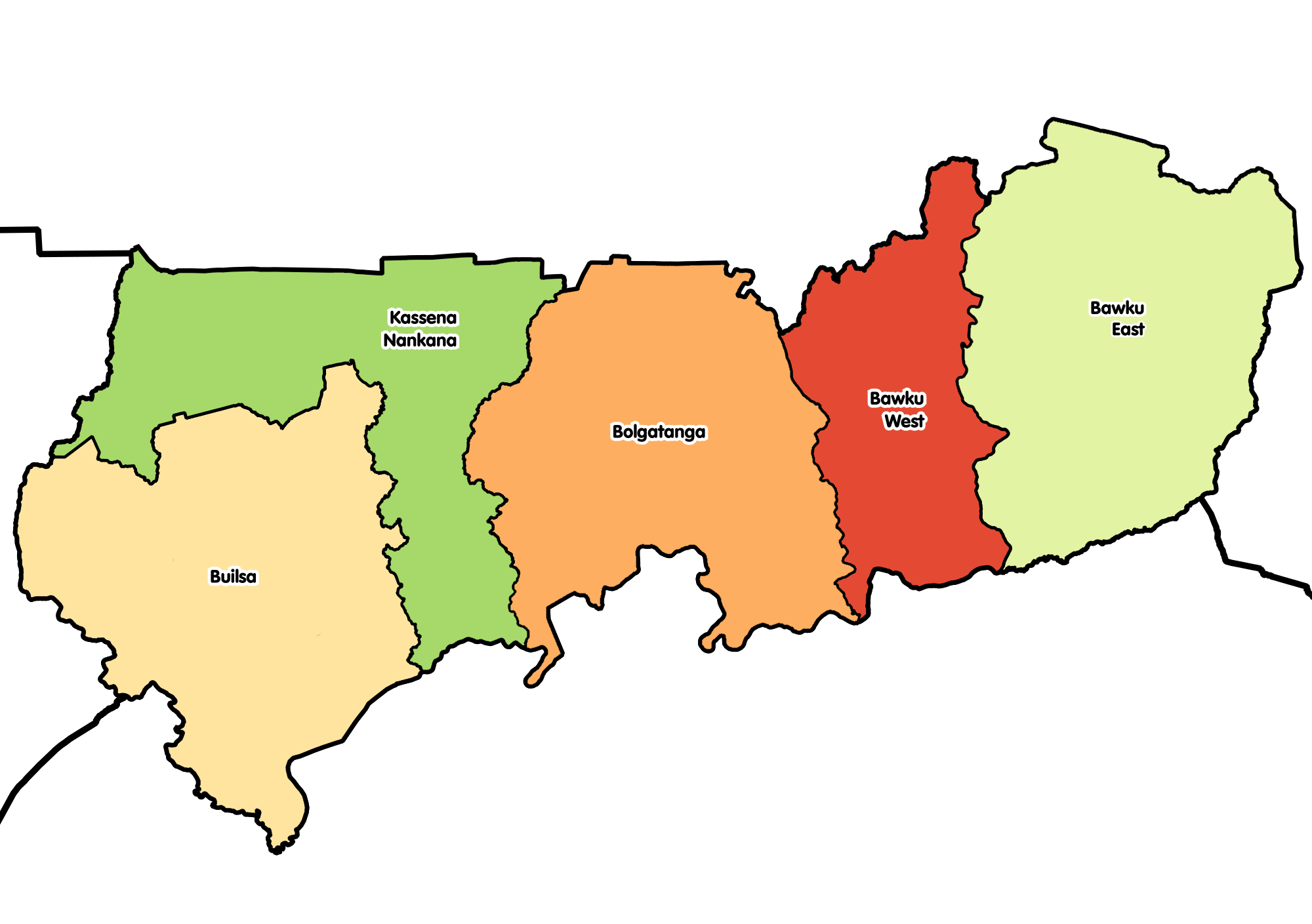
- Districts of Upper East Region

- Location of Kassena-Nankana District within Upper East
- Coordinates: 10°53′5″N 1°5′25″W
- Country: Ghana
- Region: Upper East
- Capital: Navrongo
- Time zone: UTC+0 (GMT)
- ISO 3166 code: GH-UE-KN

Kassena-Nankana District is a former district that was located in Upper East Region, Ghana. Originally created as an ordinary district assembly in 1988. However on 29 February 2008, it was split off into two new districts: Kassena-Nankana East District (which it was elevated to municipal district assembly status on 28 June 2012; capital: Navrongo) and Kassena-Nankana West District (capital: Paga). The district assembly was located in the western part of Upper East Region and had Navrongo as its capital town.

== Sources ==
- "Districts of Ghana". Statoids.
- GhanaDistricts.com
