= Boaram Festival =

Festival in Ghana by the Talensis

Boaram Festival is an annual harvest festival celebrated by the chiefs and people of Talensi in the Bongo Traditional Area in the Upper East Region of Ghana. It is usually celebrated between the months of October and November.

== Celebrations ==
During the festival, sacrifices are made to the gods.

== Significance ==
The festival is celebrated to give thanks to the gods and ancestors after harvesting farm produce and for granting good health and strength throughout the farming season.
