= Tono Dam (Ghana) =

Dam

Coordinates: 10°52′55.53″N 1°09′55.31″W

- Interactive map of Tono Dam
- Country: Ghana
- Location: Kassena Nankana District
- Purpose: Irrigation
- Status: Operational
- Construction began: 1975
- Opening date: 1985
- Owner: Ghana Government

Dam and spillways
- Impounds: Tono River

Tono Dam is one of the largest agricultural dams in western Africa, located in Kassena-Nankana District of Upper East Region, northern Ghana. The 2km long dam irrigates some 2,490 hectares of land.

== History ==
Construction of the dam started in 1975 and completed in 1985 by Taysec, a British engineering company. It was established by Ghana Government to promote the production of food crop all year round by small scale farmer within an organized and managed irrigation scheme. The Irrigation Company of Upper Region (ICOUR) was set up to manage the Dam.

== Rehabilitation ==
In 2008, the concrete slabs in the main gravity canal of the dam was rehabilitated. The Ghana Government under The Ghana Commercial Agriculture Project (GCAP) secure funding from World Bank and USAID to rehabilitate the Dam.

== Impact ==
The dam serve about seven communities, it ability to provide water for irrigation all year round have increase the cultivating of rice, soya bean, and tomato. This have improve the livelihoods of local farmers. The dam have forms a lake with a notable bird habitat.

=== Disease ===
The condition of the dam makes it ideals for the breeding of the schistosomiasis parasite. This parasite invades the body through the skin and resides in the intestinal tract or walls of the bladder. It can cause painful bleeding and sterility, if left untreated.
