= Zuarungu Senior High School =

School in Ghana

Coordinates: 10°47′47″N 00°48′26″W

Zuarungu Senior High School (French: Lycée Zuarungu) is a second cycle co-educational institution in the Upper East region of Ghana. It is located in Bolgatanga East District in the Upper East region of Ghana.

== Enrollment ==
The school enrolled 542 students in 2010. This number increased to 585 in 2011 and to 1039 in 2012.

== Facilities ==
The school has classrooms, a computer laboratory, a science laboratory and library.

== Headmasters ==
- Daniel Adebuure

== Achievement ==
The school participates fully in all sporting disciplines organized in the municipality and the region. About ten sports boys and girls from the school contested in the regional athletics team in 2001, 2005, and 2008. In 2012, the school was awarded a trophy in constitution games. It is the first school to win a contest at the regional level of the National Science and Maths Quiz.
