= Pikworo Slave camp =

Ghanaian 18th century slave camp

Coordinates: 10°57.8′N 1°07′W

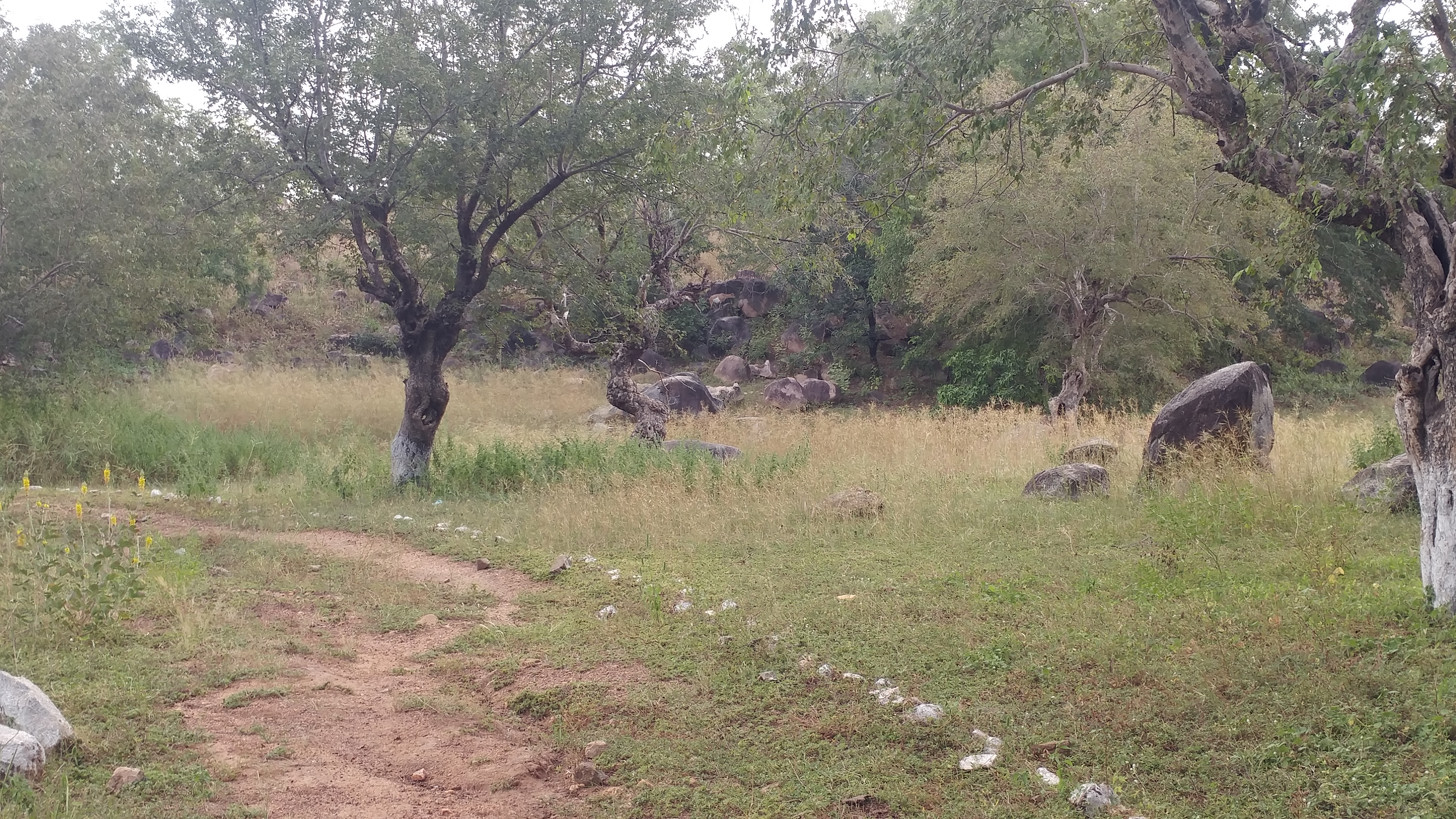
Pikworo slave camp in the upper east region of Ghana.

The Pikworo Slave Camp was a key transit point in the 18th- and 19th-century slave trade. It was established in 1704 and was active until 1845. It is located in Paga Nania, about 3 kilometers west of Paga in the Upper East Region of Ghana. It was originally developed and served as a slave transit center where slaves were auctioned and later resold in the Salaga Slave Market. From Pikworo, captives were forced to march approximately 150 kilometers south. They were later moved to the coast for shipment.

== History ==
Pikworo slave camp was a slave trading camp where people were sold to English, French, and Dutch slave traders.

Nestled among the rock formations of Paga Nania in northern Ghana, the Pikworo Slave Camp stands as a somber relic of the transatlantic slave trade . Operational from 1704 until 1845, it served as a crucial inland collection outpost where Ghanaian traders gathered captives to sell to European powers, including the French, English, and Dutch. 2

Life at the camp was defined by brutal confinement. At any given time, an average of 200 enslaved people were held there, awaiting the arduous journey to the coast. The landscape itself bears silent witness to this history: large boulders feature man-made bowls carved by captured individuals who used them as utensils, and a prominent gash in a rock served as the slave masters' water source.

The camp's operation was part of a devastatingly long process. When it was time to move, the enslaved were forced on a two-to-three-month march to the coast on foot, with no footwear, and barely clothed while their captors rode on horses.

Pikworo's active role in the trade only ceased with abolition. As our guide, James Suran-Era, notes with palpable contempt, "Once slavery was abolished in Europe, people immediately ran away. They knew what was in store for them." The camp was finally abandoned, leaving its haunting story etched into the very rocks of the landscape.

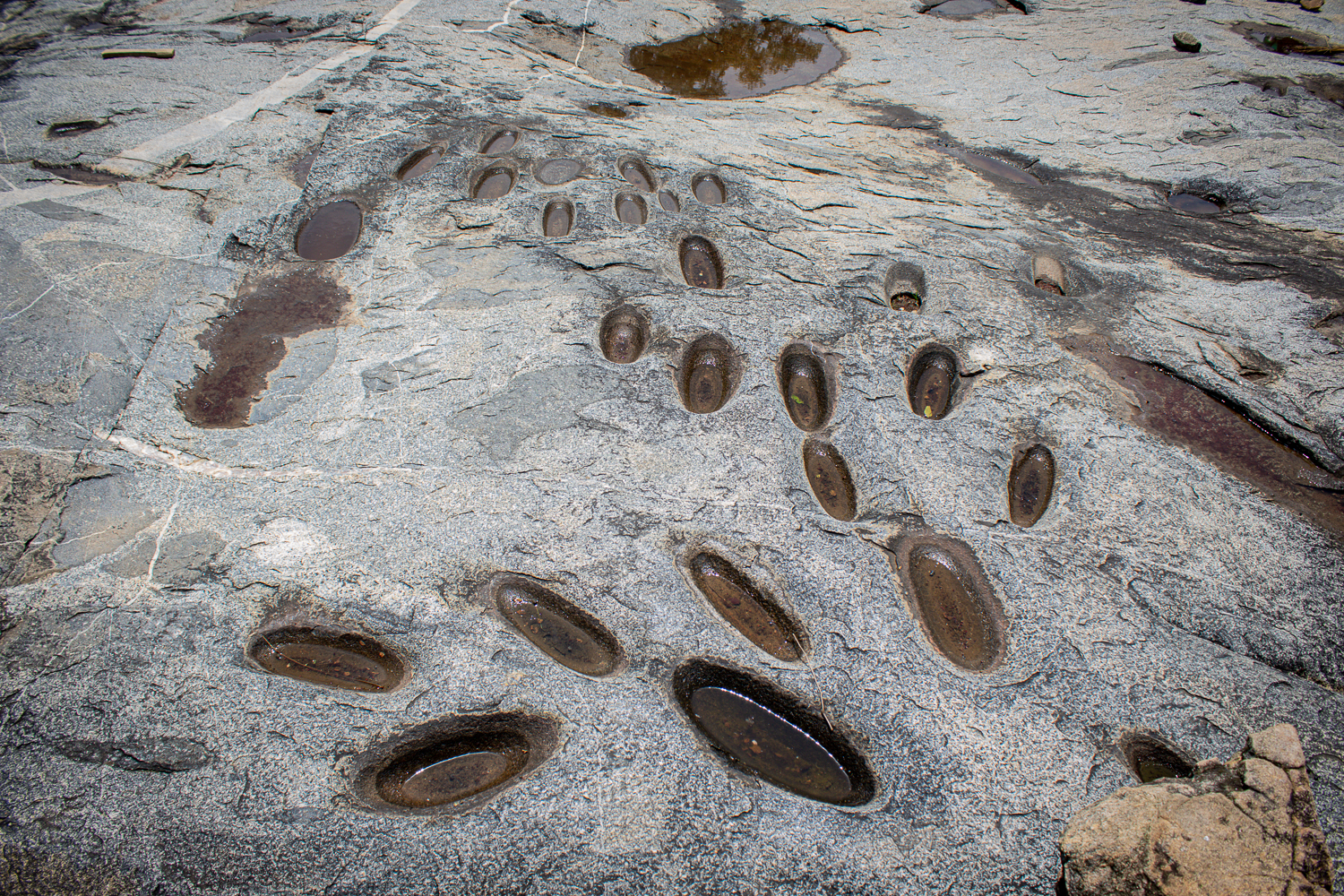
Eating Plates of Slaves at Pikworo Slave Camp

== Special Features ==
Eating Bowls Man-made scoops in rocks served as eating plates or bowls for slaves at the camp. The larger the size of the scoop, the higher the number of slaves to eat from the scoop.

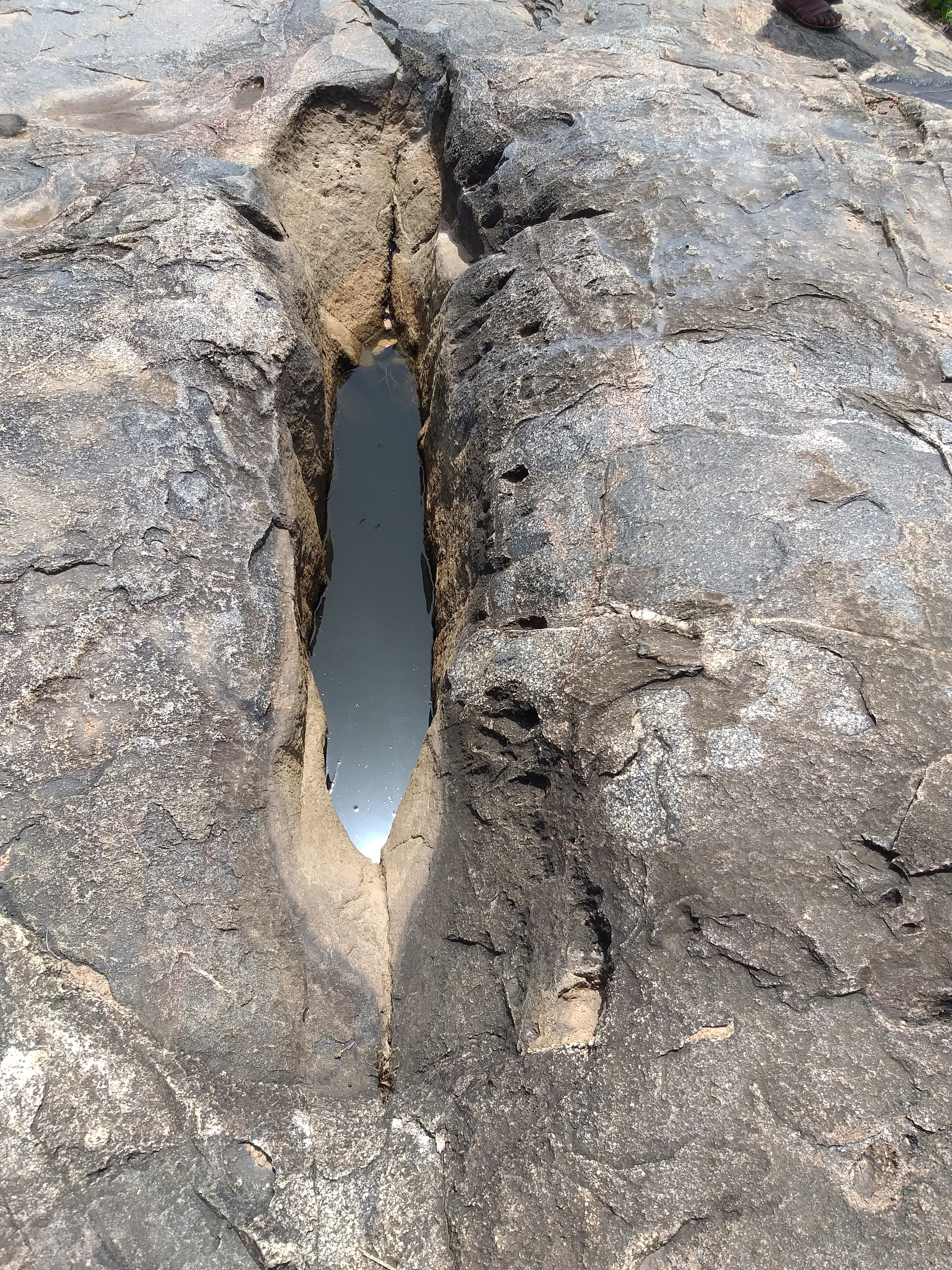
A Spring at the Pikworo slave camp

A gash in a large rock at the camp served as a source of water for cooking.

== See also ==
- Gambaga Witch camp
- Nzulezo
- Mole National Park
