= Mirigu =

Community in the Upper East Region, Ghana

- Location in Ghana
- Coordinates: 10°54′26″N 0°59′44″W
- Country: Ghana
- Region: Upper East Region
- District: Kassena Nankana West Municipal District

Mirigu is a farming community in the Kassena Nankana West Municipal District in the Upper East Region of Ghana. The Paramount Chief of the community is Naba Anthony Abisa Anansona Atasige III.

== Institutions ==
- Mirigu Primary and Junior High School
- Mothers For Peace
- Mirigu Community Day School
- Mirigu Health Canter
- Mirigu Senior High School

== Notable native ==
- Rosemary Ayelazuno Achentisa, a graduate from University of Ghana
