= Nabdam (district) =

District in Upper East Region, Ghana

Nabdam District
- District
- Districts of Upper East Region

- Location of Nabdam District within Upper East
- Coordinates: 10°51′10.44″N 0°40′12.72″W
- Country: Ghana
- Region: Upper East
- Capital: Nangodi

Population (2021)
  - Total: 51,861
- Time zone: UTC+0 (GMT)
- ISO 3166 code: GH-UE-NB

Nabdam District is one of the fifteen districts in Upper East Region, Ghana. It was formerly part of the then-larger Talensi-Nabdam District in August 2004, until the northern part of the district was split off to create Nabdam District on 28 June 2012; thus the remaining part has been renamed as Talensi District. The district assembly is located in the central part of Upper East Region and has Nangodi as its capital town.

== Villages ==
- Nangodi
- Pelugu
- Sakutɛ
- Zanlerigu
- Dasobligo
- Kongo
- Logre
- Gane_Asonge
- Yakutɛ
- zua
- kɔtintabig
- Nyogbare
- Daliga*
- Mihibong
- Daborine
- Tindongo
- Tingre
- Nakpaliga
- Soliga
- Bangoola
- zihibu
- Damoligo
- Damolg-tindong

== SCHOOLS ==
*Kongo senior high school

Presentation Brothers KG/Primary and JHS- Logre

Logre KG/Primary and JHS

*Gane-Asonge primary and junior high school

*Kongo primary and junior high

*Zanlerigu primary and junior high

=== Private schools ===
- Great Famous International School

Great Joy Academy- Logre

== Notable people ==
- Francis Tobig
- John Tia
- Mark Kurt Nawaane
- Naba Sigri Bewong
- Boniface Gambila
- Lamtia panga
