= Navrongo =

Town in Upper East Region, Ghana

- Town
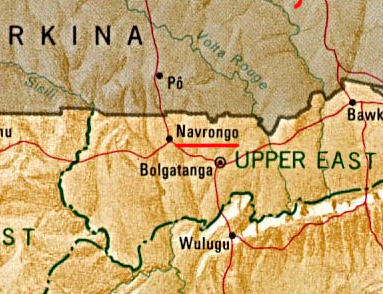
- Navrongo is in the north east of Northern Ghana, beside the Burkina Faso border

- Location of Navrongo in Upper East Region
- Coordinates: 10°53′5″N 1°5′25″W
- Country: Ghana
- Region: Upper East Region
- District: Kassena-Nankana Municipal District

Population (2012)
  - Total: 27,306
- Time zone: GMT
  - Summer (DST): GMT

Navrongo is a town and the capital of Kassena-Nankana Municipal District in the Upper East Region of northern Ghana, adjacent to the border with Burkina Faso.

Navrongo is an important market town, known for its cathedral and its grotto. It houses the Navrongo Solar Power Station, Ghana's first solar plant.

Navrongo's population in 2005 was estimated to be 25,470, and in 2012 was estimated to be 27,306.

The terrain is flat and the ecology is typical of the Sahel – arid grassland with occasional shrubbery.

== History ==
The town was founded around 1740 by Butu, a Nankane speaking hunter from Zecco (present day southern Burkina Faso), who initially settled in Pungu (a Kasem speaking community further south of Zecco). During the 19th century, the town became an important staging post on the Sahel caravan route. At the beginning of the 20th century the British established a base at Navrongo.

A Catholic mission was established in 1906 - the White Fathers ("Pères Blancs"), a French group made up of French Canadians. They came to Upper East region from Upper Volta (now Burkina Faso) due to French anti-clerical laws (the Fathers believed they would be expelled from Upper Volta). The British allowed them to set up in Navrongo on the condition that the school that they were to establish used English only. Despite a rocky beginning (the Fathers had learnt the wrong local language and only attracted 5 students in the first 18 months), the school eventually became a success – a British official in 1927 said that it was the best school (of only 5) in the north of Ghana. Following Ghana's 1957 liberation from British colonial authority, Navrongo was designated as the district capital of the Kassena/Nankani district.

== Climate ==
Navrongo has a tropical savanna climate (Aw according to the Köppen climate classification) with the temperature being hot year-round, although there is a wet season and a dry season. On 26 March 2017, Navrongo recorded a temperature of 43.8 °C (110.8 °F), which the highest temperature to have ever been recorded in Ghana.

Climate data for Navrongo (1991-2020)
Month	Jan	Feb	Mar	Apr	May	Jun	Jul	Aug	Sep	Oct	Nov	Dec	Year
Record high °C (°F)	41.2 (106.2)	44.0 (111.2)	43.8 (110.8)	44.2 (111.6)	44.6 (112.3)	39.3 (102.7)	37.2 (99.0)	35.5 (95.9)	36.1 (97.0)	39.3 (102.7)	40.6 (105.1)	42.0 (107.6)	44.6 (112.3)
Mean daily maximum °C (°F)	35.7 (96.3)	38.2 (100.8)	40.1 (104.2)	39.1 (102.4)	36.3 (97.3)	33.5 (92.3)	31.6 (88.9)	30.7 (87.3)	31.7 (89.1)	34.3 (93.7)	37.4 (99.3)	36.5 (97.7)	35.4 (95.7)
Daily mean °C (°F)	27.9 (82.2)	30.5 (86.9)	32.8 (91.0)	32.8 (91.0)	30.9 (87.6)	28.7 (83.7)	27.3 (81.1)	26.8 (80.2)	27.2 (81.0)	28.6 (83.5)	29.0 (84.2)	28.0 (82.4)	29.2 (84.6)
Mean daily minimum °C (°F)	20.1 (68.2)	22.9 (73.2)	25.6 (78.1)	26.4 (79.5)	25.4 (77.7)	23.9 (75.0)	23.1 (73.6)	22.8 (73.0)	22.7 (72.9)	22.8 (73.0)	20.6 (69.1)	19.6 (67.3)	23.0 (73.4)
Record low °C (°F)	12.8 (55.0)	15.0 (59.0)	18.3 (64.9)	19.5 (67.1)	18.9 (66.0)	19.2 (66.6)	19.0 (66.2)	18.2 (64.8)	17.7 (63.9)	18.0 (64.4)	15.6 (60.1)	13.3 (55.9)	12.8 (55.0)
Average precipitation mm (inches)	0.2 (0.01)	3.2 (0.13)	7.8 (0.31)	55.9 (2.20)	107.9 (4.25)	127.7 (5.03)	192.1 (7.56)	268.7 (10.58)	156.1 (6.15)	63.0 (2.48)	2.4 (0.09)	0.0 (0.0)	985.0 (38.78)
Average precipitation days (≥ 1.0 mm)	0.0	0.3	1.0	3.9	6.5	8.6	11.2	14.6	12.0	5.9	0.2	0.0	64.2
Source 1: NOAA
Source 2: Sistema de Clasificación Bioclimática Mundial (extremes)

== Navrongo Cathedral ==
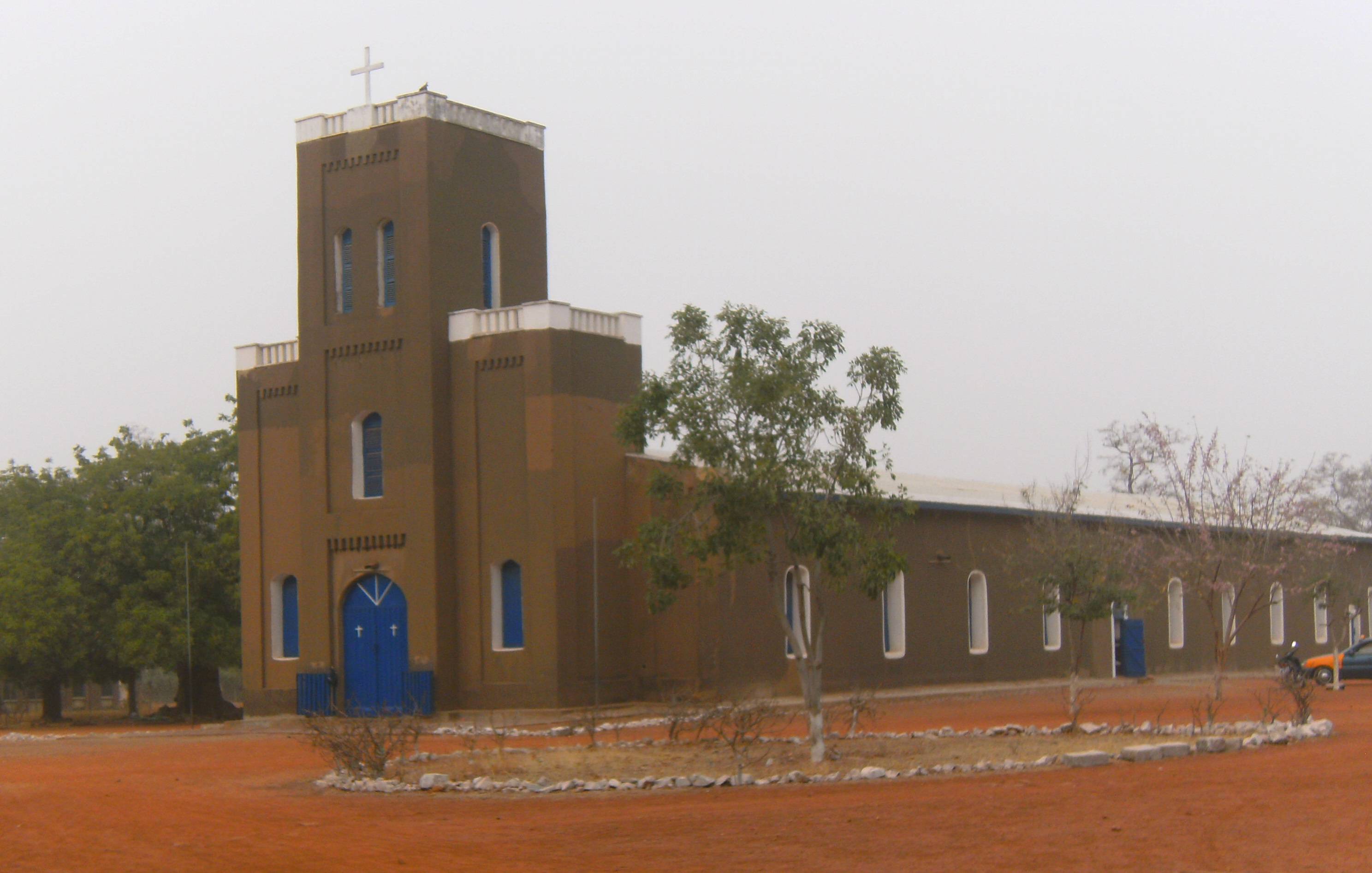
Navrongo's "mud cathedral"

Navrongo Cathedral, as it is now known, was built in 1906 and expanded in 1920. Originally called "Our Lady of Seven Sorrows", the construction was overseen by the White Fathers. The walls are of mud (therefore it is also called "Mud Cathedral"), and wooden beams form the roof. On the inside, the walls are decorated with animal forms, scenes of everyday life, and Christian themes such as the Last Supper and the Bethlehem scene in the entrance area. The site also contains a grotto and accommodation facilities.

== Etymology of name ==
The word "Navrongo" is an Anglicization of the name navrongo which is in Nankane, which combines the word naare (meaning foot or leg in Nankane) with vorongo (the term given to the sound of stepping onto muddy soil) or "voro" which is the Kasem term for same. This is why Kasena call the town "Navoro" while Nankana call it "Navorongo."

== See also ==
- Navrongo Airport
- Telania
- Doba, Ghana
- Tono Dam
- Navrongo Senior High
- Notre Dame
