= Tongo, Ghana =

Tongo
- District Capital
- Location of Tongo in Upper East region
- Coordinates: 10°43′N 0°48′W
- Country: Ghana
- Region: Upper East Region
- District: Talensi

Population (2013)
  - Total: —
- Time zone: GMT
  - Summer (DST): GMT

Tongo is a small town near the Upper East region capital of Bolgatanga, and Tongo is the capital of Talensi-Nabdam District in the Upper East Region of Northern part of Ghana. Tongo is known for the "Tengzug shrine", and for its sowing and harvest festivals.

Another visitor's sight in the town is the Tongo Whistling Rocks. Located 10 kilometers (6 mi.) from Bolgatanga, these granite rocks jut dramatically from the terrain. The rocks also make a strange whistling sound during November and December, when the harmattan wind blow the Sahara throughout the Northern Region.
