= Talensi-Nabdam District =

- Former District
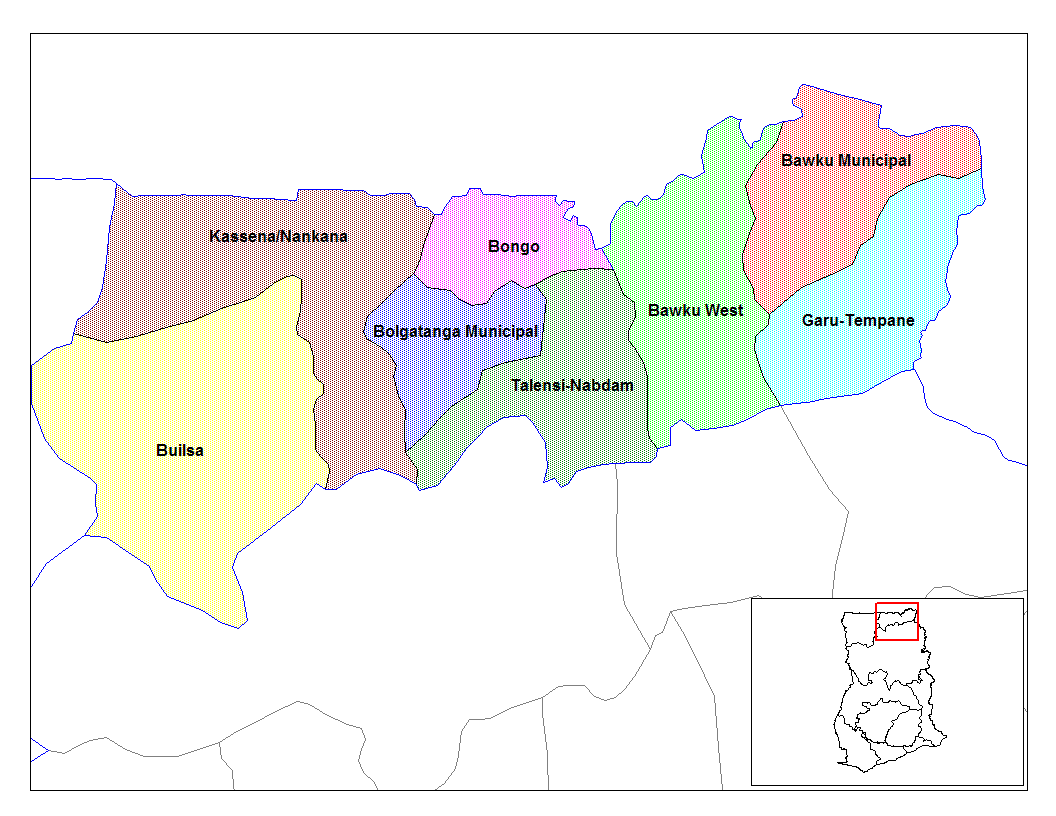
- Districts of Upper East Region

- Location of Talensi-Nabdam District within Upper East
- Coordinates: 10°42′11.16″N 0°48′20.16″W
- Country: Ghana
- Region: Upper East
- Capital: Tongo

Government
  - District Executive: Sebastian T. Bisnab

Area
  - Total: 912 km^{2} (352 sq mi)

Population (2013)
  - Total: —
- Time zone: UTC+0 (GMT)
- ISO 3166 code: GH-UE-TN

Talensi-Nabdam District is a former district that was located in Upper East Region, Ghana. Originally it was formerly part of the then-larger Bolgatanga District in August 2004. However, on 28 June 2012, it was split oft into two new districts: Talensi District (capital: Tongo) and Nabdam District (capital: Nangodi). The district assembly was located in the central part of Upper East Region and had Tongo as its capital town.

== Background ==
As of 2010, Talensi-Nabdam District had a population of about 94,650. It was bordered to the north by Bolgatanga District, to the south by West and East Mamprusi Districts, to the west by Kassena-Nanakana District and the east by Bawku West District. The district lied between latitude 10.15° and 10.60° north of the Equator and longitude 0.31° and 10.50.

== Physical and natural environment ==
=== Topography and drainage ===
The district has gentle slopes ranging from 1% to 5% gradient with some isolated rocks while some upland slopes range around 10% at the Tongo and Nangodi areas. The district is drained mainly by the Red and White Volta and their tributaries.

=== Geology and soil ===
The rocks fall within the Birimian, Tarkwaian and Voltaria types of Ghana. There is evidence of presence of minerals, especially gold.

=== Climate ===
The climate is tropical with two distinct seasons, the wet (rainy) and dry (no rain). The rainy season is erratic, and runs from May to October each year with an annual mean of 950mm. The dry season is long and stretches from October to April. Temperatures can be with a maximum of 45.0 C in March and April with a minimum of 12.0C in December.

=== Vegetation ===
The vegetation is guinea savannah woodland consisting of short widely spread deciduous trees and a ground flora of grass, which get burnt by fire or sun scorch during the long dry season. The most common economic trees are the shea nuts, dawadawa, baobab and acacia.

The district has three gazetted forest reserves covering a total area of 455.21 km^{2}; Nyokoko (established in 1954), Tankwiddi East and the Red Volta were respectively established in 1956.

=== Environmental situation ===
The natural environment is fairly degraded as it faces threat of severe drought with high temperatures and perennial outbreak of bush fires. It is evident that high population densities (especially in towns) with high demand for land for constructional activities, extensive cultivation, over-grazing, erratic rainfall and the extent of devastation do affect the natural environment thereby exposing it to desertification. Illegal surface mining is a major threat to the environment by degrading land and pollution of water bodies.

=== Water supply ===
Access to potable water is indeed a problem and the District Assembly and other development partners are working to collectively find a solution. Small Town Water System (STWS) have provided boreholes and hand-dug wells for many communities in the district with support from NGOs (ADRA, Rural Aid and WorldVision Ghana).

== Labour force ==
The labour force in the district comprises agricultural labour, non-agricultural labour and casual labour. Under agricultural labour, family labour claims over 60% usually comprising men, women and children of age 15 years at least. The remaining 40% goes to non-agricultural labour and casual labour. The demand for labour is at its peak in the rainy season, when more farming activities are being carried out.

== Agriculture (husbandry) ==
The District Agricultural Development Unit is geared towards ensuring food security all year round in collaboration with other development partners. Agriculture plays important roles in the socio-economic development of the Talensi-Nabdam District, aside food security; it provides employment and incomes for over 90% the population. The district has arable land area of 56% (49,200 ha) and 9,000 farm households with an average land holding of 1.2ha per household which falls below the National Average of 4ha. About 90% of its population is peasant farmers who grow mostly food crops.

=== Crops ===
The main crops cultivated by farmers during the rainy season are:

- Cereals: millet, sorghum, rice, maize
- Legumes: groundnuts, cowpea, soybean, bambara beans
- Vegetables: tomato, pepper, okro, garden eggs,
- Tubers: Sweet Potato, frafra potato.

=== Livestock ===
Apart from crop production, livestock and poultry rearing is the second most important feature in agricultural development. Almost all farmers are engaged in the rearing of at least one type of livestock and poultry. Livestock serves as a good source of income for farmers especially when there is crop failure. Production is largely at the subsistence level. The livestock reared include poultry (guinea fowls, fowls, ducks, and turkeys), cattle, sheep, goats, pigs and donkeys.

== Sources ==
- "Districts of Ghana". Statoids.
