= Kassena-Nankana Municipal District =

Municipal district in Upper East region, Ghana

- Municipal District
- Districts of Upper East Region

- Location of Kassena-Nankana Municipal District within Upper East
- Coordinates: 10°53′5″N 1°5′25″W
- Country: Ghana
- Region: Upper East
- Capital: Navrongo

Government
  - Municipal Chief Executive: William Aduum

Area
  - Total: 767 km^{2} (296 sq mi)

Population (2021)
  - Total: 134,018 (males: 65,429; females: 68,589)
- Time zone: UTC+0 (GMT)
- ISO 3166 code: GH-UE-KM
- Website: Official Website

Kassena-Nankana Municipal is one of the fifteen districts in Upper East Region, Ghana. Originally it was formerly part of the then-larger Kassena-Nankana District in 1988, until the western part of the district was split off to create Kassena-Nankana West District on 29 February 2008; thus the remaining part has been renamed as Kassena-Nankana East District, which it was later elevated to municipal assembly status on 28 June 2012 to become Kassena-Nankana Municipal District. The municipality is located in the western part of Upper East Region and has Navrongo as its capital town.

== Background ==
The municipality lies approximately between latitude 11°10' and 10°3' North and longitude 10°1' West. The Municipality is bounded by seven (7) districts and one country; on the North by Kassena Nankana West District and Burkina Faso, on the East by Kassena Nankana West District, Bolgatanga Municipality, Talensi District and Bongo District, on the West by the Builsa South and Builsa North Districts and on the South by West Mamprusi Municipality (in the Northern Region).

== Physical features ==
=== Climatic conditions ===
The climatic conditions of the Kassena Nankana Municipality is characterized by the dry and wet seasons, which are influenced mainly by two (2) air masses – the North-East Trade winds and the South-Westerly's (Tropical Maritime). The harmattan air mass (North-East Trade Winds) is usually dry and dusty as it originates from the Sahara Desert. During such periods, rainfall is virtually absent due to low relative humidity, which rarely exceeds 20 percent and low vapour pressure less than 10mb. Day temperatures are high recording 42 °C (especially between February and March) and night temperatures could be as low as 18 °C. The Municipality experiences the tropical maritime air mass between May and October. The average annual rainfall is 950mm.

=== Relief and drainage ===
The Municipality is generally low-lying. The landscape is generally undulating with isolated hills rising up to about 300 metres above sea level in the western parts of the municipality. Notably among these hills include Fie (280 metres), Busono (350 metres) and Zambao (360 metres) above sea level. The drainage system of the municipality is constituted mainly around the tributaries of the Sissili River – Asibelika, Afumbeli, Bukpegi and Beeyi. A tributary of the Asibelika River (Tono River) has been dammed to provide irrigation facilities.

=== Vegetation ===
The Kassena-Nankana Municipality lies within the Guinea Savannah woodlands. The Municipality is covered mainly by the Sahel and Sudan-Savannah types of vegetation consisting mainly of the savannah grassland with short trees and thumps. Common trees found are Dawadawa, Baobab, Sheanut and Mango. 2 Figure 1.1: District map of Kassena Nankana East Municipality

=== Soil ===
Two main types of soil are present in the municipality namely the Savannah ochrosols and groundwater laterite. The northern and eastern parts of the municipality are covered by the Savannah ochrosols, while the rest has groundwater laterite The Savannah ochrosols are porous, well drained, loamy, and mildly acidic and interspersed with patches of black or dark-grey clayey soils. The groundwater laterites are developed mainly over shale and granite and cover approximately sixty percent of the municipality's land area. This soil type is suitable for the cultivation of many crops, especially rice and vegetables and hence accounts for the arable land sites including most parts of the Tono Irrigation Project sites where both wet and dry season farming activities are concentrated (KNMA, 2010).

== Political administration ==
The Kassena Nankana Municipal Assembly is the highest administrative and political authority in the municipality and is charged with the responsibility of formulating and implementing development plans, programmes and projects. The Municipal General Assembly comprises 49 members, 35 elected and 14 appointed in addition to the Municipal Chief Executive (MCE) and a Member of Parliament (MP). The Municipal Chief Executive and the Member of Parliament, however, have no voting rights. The Executive Committee operates through sub-committees that are statutory or instituted by the assembly itself. There are 9 of such committees in the assembly including; the social services; justice and security; finance and administrative; women and children; works; economic and development planning; climate, environment and agriculture; medium and small scale enterprise and public compliant committees. There are six (6) areas/urban councils in the municipality. They include, Kologo, Pungu, Pindaa, Naaga, Gia area councils and the Navrongo Urban Council. There also exist decentralized departments that aid the Municipal Assembly to achieve the overall development in the Municipality. These decentralized departments include: the central administration, works department, physical planning department, department of trade and industry, agriculture department, social welfare and community development, finance department, department of education youth and sports, department of forestry game and wild life, disaster prevention and management, feeder roads department, department of registry of births and deaths and information services department.

== Social and cultural structure ==
=== Traditional authority ===
There are chiefs and Tindanas/Tigatus in every community. People with these two titles in the communities wield a considerable power and authority over their people. While the chiefs are the traditional political heads in the communities, the Tindanas/Tigatus are the main custodians of the land relate the ancestral traditions and hold in trust for the people. In relation to ownership of land, individuals do not own lands but the family heads hold these in trust for the family. The chiefs oversee the distribution and sale of land. The four Tindanas/Tigatus the original owners of the land, however transfer land to other family heads.

=== Marriage ===
The payment of bride price takes the form of cola nuts, tobacco and guinea fowls. In addition, bridegrooms pay seven sheep and a cow together with the aforementioned items. It becomes obligatory for the bridegroom to present a cow upon the death of the bride if initially he did not present one. If one was unable to pay the sheep and the cow, the children would be mandated to provide one before they can pay dowry for their own wives.

=== Inheritance ===
The patrilineal system of inheritance is practiced. The eldest son inherits the deceased father in trust of the family. There is no form of ownership of family assets by daughters ascribed by the traditional system. Funerals constitute another major customary practice of the people. Funerals are mostly organized after the harvest (and especially during the long dry season). Funerals are performed to mark the end of the transition from earth to life after death (The spirit world).

=== Social organization ===
Despite the diverse religious groups in the municipality, they co-exist peacefully. The various religious groups assist in the development of the communities in the Municipality. The Catholic Church, for instance, has been assisting in the educational and water infrastructure.

== Economy ==
=== Agriculture ===
Agriculture is the dominant economic activity in the municipality. The major crops grown are millet, sorghum, rice, groundnuts, leafy vegetables, cowpea, bambara beans, okro, cotton, tomatoes and onions. Livestock reared in the municipality include cattle, sheep, goat, pigs, guinea fowls, fowls and other domestic animals like donkeys. Fish farming involving Tilapia and Mudfish are quite significant. Farm sizes are quite small and yields are very low as compared to other parts of the country due in part to poor soils and unreliable rainfall. There are few dams and dugouts which are being used for dry season farming. This has implications for food insecurity.

=== Commerce ===
Trading and commercial activities in the municipality revolves mainly around foodstuffs, semi-processed food and crafts. These commodities are sold in the local markets and outside the municipality. Commodities traded in ranges from foodstuffs and livestock to manufactured goods.

=== Manufacturing ===
The Kassena-Nankana Municipality has not much large scale manufacturing industries. It is mostly characterized by small scale food processing, craft and manufacturing industries, examples of which include smock weaving, pottery and blacksmithing.

=== Agricultural industry and processing ===
Processing of foodstuffs, cash crops and other goods are common features of the local economy. The major small scale industrial activities includes, sheabutter extraction, pito brewing, milling or grinding of millet for domestic use, dawadawa processing, weaving and dressmaking, pottery, rice milling and soap making. Most of these small scale industries are one-man businesses and hardly employ people. The sector is dominated by females and needs to be organized into groups and their capacities built to enhance their businesses. There are also varied business types in the municipality which needs to be developed in order to boost the local economy.

=== Banking and financial services ===
The Naara Rural Bank Limited, with its head office located at Paga has an agency at Navrongo. There are also non-banking institutions in the municipality which collaborate with the financial institutions to offer credit to groups and individuals. Such institutions include Non-governmental Organizations, Community Based Rural Development Project and National Board for Small Scale Industries. In addition, non-formal credit arrangements such as "Susu" are available for traders and small-scale producers.

=== Resources for development ===
The municipality is endowed with both human and natural resources. The siting of one of the campuses of the University for Development Studies in the municipality has also enhanced the easy access to tertiary education to the youth thereby enhancing human capital in the municipality. Sand and clay are the major natural minerals mined in the municipality for construction purposes. The special weather condition has also made it possible for the generation of electricity for national use through a solar plant in Pungu, a suburb of Navrongo. The Tono irrigation facility has also made it possible for all-year round cultivation of crops especially vegetables such as tomato, pepper, cabbage and onion.

=== Tourism and recreation ===
The municipality abounds in tourism potentials including various sites, cultural practices and other features of tourists' interests. The major ones among them are: the Unique Catholic Cathedral Edifices and the Tono Irrigation Dam, both in Navrongo. The festivals and funerals of the people are sources of tourist attraction. Supporting the tourism industry in the municipality is the hospitality industry, offering recreation and avenues for socialization. They include: Mayaga Hotel, Tono Guest and Club Houses, Catholic Social Centres and many new guest houses in the various communities.

== Sources ==
- "Districts of Ghana". Statoids.
- GhanaDistricts.com
- Official Website
