= Paga =

- District Capital
- Location of Paga in Upper East region
- Coordinates: 10°59′32″N 01°06′48″W
- Country: Ghana
- Region: Upper East Region
- District: Kassena Nankana West District
- Elevation: 690 ft (210 m)

Population (2013)
  - Total: 102
- Time zone: GMT
  - Summer (DST): GMT

Paga is a town in Upper East Region of Ghana, lying north of Bolgatanga. Paga is the capital of Kassena Nankana West District, a district in the Upper East Region in the northern part of Ghana. The town is located on the border of Burkina Faso and is 166 km south of Ouagadougou via the N5 highway, the main road linking Ghana and Burkina Faso. The majority of the people of Paga are of the Kassena tribe.

== Overview ==
Paga is known for its sacred crocodile ponds, where most visitors are surprised that they can touch a live crocodile. Paga is a small town in the Upper East Region, and has a population of about 10,000. However, the entire population of Paga – including its outskirts – is over 100,000. Most of the inhabitants are farmers of the Kassena ethnic group, whose settlements and familial ties stretch over the colonial borders of Ghana into what is now Burkina Faso. The idea of different nationalities mean little to these people, who see their shared ancestry and ethnicity before what is the recent concept of nationality or religion. Many Kassenas in this small town Paga are multilingual, speaking their native Kasem and English among other languages.

== Tourist site ==
Paga crocodile pond.

== Foundation ==
According to legend, Paga was founded c. 1400 by a young man named Naveh, who was saved by a crocodile while on a hunting expedition. He then left his village and settled in the place which is now Paga. The founder of the town, Naveh, when searching for a desirable place to settle, exclaimed 'Ayipaga' which means 'My eye is fixed on this land'. The place came to be called by that name, which in due course was shortened to 'Paga'.
