= Upper East Region =

Region of Ghana

Upper East Region, Dagbon
- Region
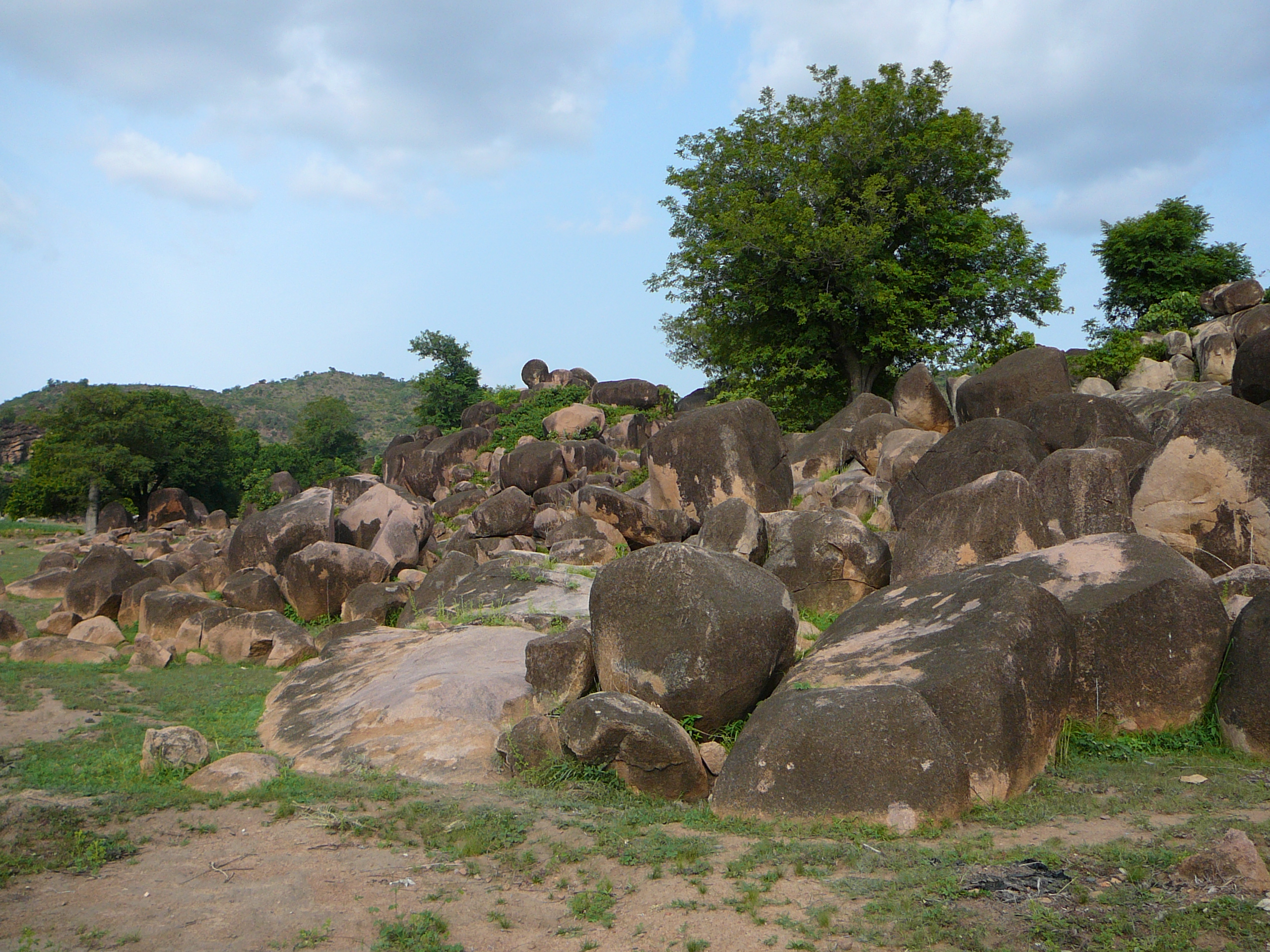
- Rock formation in the Tongo Hills near Gorogo

- Location of Upper East Region in Ghana
- Country: Ghana
- Capital: Bolgatanga
- Districts: 15

Government
  - Regional Minister: Akamugri Donatus Atanga

Area
  - Total: 8,842 km^{2} (3,414 sq mi)
  - Rank: Ranked 9th

Population (2021 Census)
  - Total: 1,301,226
  - Rank: Ranked 9th
  - Density: 147.2/km^{2} (381.2/sq mi)

GDP (PPP)
  - Year: 2013
  - Per capita: $5,150

GDP (Nominal)
  - Year: 2013
  - Per capita: $2,500
- Time zone: GMT
- Area code: 039
- ISO 3166 code: GH-UE
- HDI (2017): 0.520 low · 8th

The Upper East Region is located in the northern part of Ghana, and it is the third smallest of the 16 administrative regions in Ghana. Despite its relatively small size, the region holds an outsized significance in the nation's cultural heritage and historical narrative. It occupies a total land surface of 8,842 square kilometers, hence constituting a modest 2.7% of Ghana's total land area. The regional capital is Bolgatanga, which is sometimes referred to as Bolga. It is a major center for the production and sale of beautifully woven baskets, leather goods, and straw handicrafts. Bolga serves as the administrative and commercial heartbeat of the region. Other major towns in the region include Navrongo, Paga, Sandema, Bawku, Zebilla, Tempane, Pusiga, Garu, Googo, Pwalugu, and Widana.

== Geography ==
=== Location and size ===
The Upper East Region is located in the north-eastern corner of Ghana and is bordered by Burkina Faso to the north and Togo to the east. It lies between longitude 0° and 1° West and latitudes 10° 30′N and 11°N. The region shares boundaries with Burkina Faso to the north, Togo to the east, Upper West Region to the west, and the Northern Region to the south. The Upper East Region is divided into 15 districts, each headed by a district chief executive.

The region's landscape is predominantly characterized by gentle slopes mixed with rock outcrops and uplands and the dramatic escarpments of the Gambaga Scarp 2. This geography is part of the broader Sudanian Savanna ecosystem, featuring sparse drought-resistant trees such as baobabs, acacias, and shea trees. The climate of Upper East is hot and semi-arid, with a single, highly unpredictable rainy season from May to October. The long, intense dry season (November to April) makes the region one of the most vulnerable to climate variability in Ghana.

=== Rural Development Challenges ===
Development initiatives in the region's rural communities have faced implementayon challenges.In 2026,an investigative audit by The Fourth Estate highlighted a World Bank- funded aquaculture project intended to support local livelihoods in two communities within the region.The investigation revealed that structural and planning failuures rendered the infrastructure unusable for the resident farmers, underscoring broader local governance and project sustainability issues in the area's agricultural sector.

== Tourism ==
=== Recreation areas ===
- Tongo Hills
- Bongo Rocks
- Tono Dam

=== Historic sites ===
- Navrongo's mud-built church
- Pikworo Slave camp
- Naa Gbewa Shrine in PUSIGA

=== Festivals ===
The region plays host to many festivals throughout the year, most of which are either to bring a good planting season or celebrate the harvest.

- Samanpiid festival
- Gologo Festival
- Fao Festival
- Foek Festival
- Kuure Festival, Zaare
- Feok festival builsa
- Zekula festival by Bissa people
- Boaram Festival
- Tengana festival by the people of Balungu, Winkongo and Pwalugu
- The Ndaakoya festival by the Frafra, Talensi, and Nabdam-speaking communities.

=== Other tourist attractions ===
- Upper East Regional Museum
- Sirigu Pottery and Arts Center
- Bolga market: a market for farmers and livestock, held twice-weekly.
- Bolgatanga Craft Village
- Paga Crocodile Pond
- Tongo Hills and Tenzug Shrines

== Demographics ==
=== Population ===
The center of population of the Upper East Region is located in its capital of Bolgatanga, which serves as the primary hub for commerce, administration, and services, naturally attracting a concentration of people from the surrounding areas.

The population is overwhelmingly rural. With 79% of its population living in rural areas, it holds the distinction of being the least urbanized region in Ghana. The rural population was 87.1% in 1984 and 84.3% in 2000. There was, thus, a 2.8%age point reduction in the rural share of the population between 1984 and 2000 and a further 5.3% reduction between 2000 and 2010. High-risk districts in the northern belt have been identified as having significant health insurance coverage gaps driven by localized socioeconomic determinants.

With only 21% of the population living in urban areas, the region is the least urbanized in Ghana. In fact, together with Upper West, they are the two regions with less than 20% urban population.

Ghanaian citizens by birth, childhood, or parenthood constitute 92.5% of the population of the Upper East region. Naturalized Ghanaian citizens constitute 5.3%.

The Upper East Region has a total population of 1,301,221, according to the 2021 Population and Housing Census (PHC) conducted by the Ghana Statistical Service, indicating that the Upper East Region represents 4.2% of Ghana's population.

The region has a total of 631,963 males and 669,963 females, representing 48.5 and 51.5% of the population, respectively.

== Transportation ==
Three national highways—N2, N10, and N11—and a few regional highways, such as the R113, R114, R116, and R181, serve the region.

The N10 originates from Yemoransa in the Central Region and connects through Kumasi in the Ashanti Region and terminates at Paga in the Upper East Region. The national capital of Accra is also connected to the region by the N2, which terminates in Kulungugu in the Upper East Region. Both these national routes are connected by the N11, which links the regional capital of Bolgatanga to Bimpiela, also in the region.

== Administrative divisions ==
The political administration of the region is through the local government system. Under this administration system, the region is divided into 15 MMDAs (made up of 0 metropolitan, 4 Municipal and 15 ordinary assemblies). Each District, Municipal, or Metropolitan Assembly is administered by a Chief Executive, who represents the central government but derives authority from an Assembly headed by a presiding member elected from among the members themselves. The current list is as follows:

Old Map of the Districts of the Upper East Region (2016)

Districts of the Upper East Region
#	MMDA Name	Capital	MMDA Type	Population
1	Bawku	Bawku	Municipal	
2	Bawku West	Zebilla	Ordinary	
3	Binduri	Binduri	Ordinary	
4	Bolgatanga	Bolgatanga	Municipal	
5	Bolgatanga East	Zuarungu	Ordinary	
6	Bongo	Bongo	Ordinary	
7	Builsa North	Sandema	Municipal	
8	Builsa South	Fumbisi	Ordinary	
9	Garu	Garu	Ordinary	
10	Kassena Nankana East	Navrongo	Municipal	
11	Kassena-Nankana West	Paga	Ordinary	
12	Nabdam	Nangodi	Ordinary	
13	Pusiga	Pusiga	Ordinary	
14	Talensi	Tongo	Ordinary	
15	Tempane	Tempane	Ordinary	

== Education ==
=== Senior high schools ===
- Azeem-Namoo Senior High School
- Awe Senior High/Tech School
- Bolga Girls Senior High School
- Bawku Senior High/Tech School
- Bolgatanga Senior High School
- Binduri Community SHS
- Bongo Senior High School
- Chiana Senior High School
- Fumbisi Senior High School
- Gowrie Senior High Tech School
- Gambigo Day Community SHS
- Garu Day Community SHS
- Kongo Senior High School
- Kusanaba Senior High School
- Navrongo Senior High School
- Nabango Senior High
- Notre Dame Sem/ Senior High School
- Mirigu Community Day SHS
- O. L. L. Girls Senior High School
- Paga Senior High School
- Queen Of Peace Senior High School
- Sandema Senior High/Tech School
- Sandema Senior High School
- Sapelliga Community SHS
- Sirigu Senior High School
- St John's Integrated Senior High/Tech
- Tempane Senior High School
- Zamse Senior High/Tech School
- Zebilla Senior High/Tech School
- Zorkor Senior High School
- St John's Integrated SHTS
- Zuarungu Senior High School
- Bawku Senior High School
- Bawku Technical School

=== Tertiary Institutions ===
- Bolgatanga Technical University
- St. John Bosco's College of Education
- Gbewaa College of Education, Pusiga
- University of Technology & Applied Sciences
- Navrongo Community Nursing Training College
- Regentropfen University College (ReCAS), Bongo
- Bolgatanga Nursing and Midwifery Training College
- Zuarungu Nursing & Midwifery Training College
- Bawku Nursing Training College

== Sports ==
- Bolgatanga Manchester City F.C.
- Bolga F.C
- Bawku Royals FC
- Bawku Real United
- Bawku United Stars

== Notable native citizens ==
Notable native citizens of Upper East region
#	Citizen	Settlement
1	Joseph Kofi Adda	Navrongo
2	Roland Agambire	Sirigu
3	Roger A. Agana	Soe
4	David Atanga	Namoo
5	Theresa Lardi Awuni	Winkongo
6	Adam Kwarasey	Navrongo
7	Abedi Pele	Paga
8	Mark Woyongo	Navrongo
9	Hawa Yakubu	Pusiga
10	Stephen Yakubu	Binduri
11	Adabere Adabre Donald	Bolgatanga
12	John Akparibo Ndebugre	Bawku
13	Cletus Apul Avoka	Bawku
14	Mahama Ayariga	Bawku
15	Awini Emmanuel Ayonde	Bawku
16	Laadi Ayi Ayamga	Pusiga
17	Rev. Professor John Azumah	Bawku
18	Simon Atingban Akunye	Pusiga
18	Dr.Kingley Akurugu	Bawku
19	Dominic Akuritinga Ayine	Zuarungu
20	Eastwood Anaba	Bolgatanga
21	Akuka Dickson Atule	Zebilla

== Sources ==
- "Districts of Ghana". Statoids.
- GhanaDistricts.com
- Ghana Statistical Service
