= Builsa South (Ghana parliament constituency) =

Constituency in Ghana

- constituency for the Parliament of Ghana
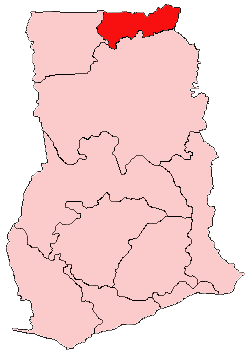
- District: Builsa District
- Region: Upper East Region of Ghana

Current constituency
- Party: National Democratic Congress
- MP: Dr Clement Apaak

Builsa South is one of the constituencies represented in the Parliament of Ghana. It elects one Member of Parliament (MP) by the first past the post system of election. Builsa South is located in the Builsa district of the Upper East Region of Ghana.

== Boundaries ==
The seat is located within the Builsa District in the Upper East Region of Ghana.

== 1.1 Background ==
The Builsa South District was created on 7 June 2012. It was carved out of the then Builsa District. The district is one of the four that were created in the region in 2012 that brought the total number of districts in the region to thirteen. It has Fumbisi as its administrative capital. The Legislative Instrument that mandated its establishment is the Local Government Act, 1993 (Act 462) of 2012 is (LI 2104).

== 1.2 Physical Features ==
The topography of the area is undulating and slopes ranging from 200 meters to 300 meters, in the western and northern parts of the district particularly around Kaseisa and Doninga zones. In the most popular Fumbisi valleys where farming is done throughout the year, the slopes are gentler and ranges from 150 metres to 200 metres.

=== 1.2.1 Location and Size ===
Builsa South District lies between longitudes 1 0 05’ West and 10 35’ West and latitudes 100 20’ North and 100 50’ North of the equator. The district shares boundaries with the Builsa North district to the north, Mamprugu Moagduri District in the Northern Region to the South, West Mamprusi District to the west, and the Sisala East District in the Upper West Region to the east.

=== 1.2.2 Relief and Drainage ===
The topography of the area is undulating and slopes ranging from 200 metres to 300 metres are found in the western and northern part of the district particularly. In the valleys of Kulpawn, Besibeli, Asibelika and the Azimzim, the slopes are gentler and range from 150 metres to 200 metres. Inselbergs and other granitic outcrops occasionally break the monotony of the near flat surfaces. In general the low-lying nature of the land makes greater part of it liable to flooding in years of copious rains. Like most parts of northern Ghana, a significant portion of the district falls within the Volta basin and is heavily dissected by a number of important tributaries of the White Volta such as the Kulpawn, Asebelika, Belipieni, etc., giving a very high drainage density. Most of these streams are however seasonal and dry up during the extended dry season with an adverse effect on the supply of water for both agricultural and domestic use. The high drainage density coupled with the low-lying terrain, reduces easy accessibility in the district especially during the rainy season. Between July and September in particular, most rivers and streams overflow their banks, a number of roads, tracks and footpaths are flooded and settlements cut off from the centre.

=== 1.2.3 Rainfall and Climate ===
The District has mean monthly temperatures ranging between 21.90 C and 34.10 C. The highest temperatures are recorded in March and this can rise to 450 C, whereas the lowest temperatures are recorded in January. The dry season is characterized by dry harmattan winds and wide diurnal temperature ranges. There is only one rainy season, which builds up gradually from little rains in April to a maximum in August-September, and then declines sharply to a complete halt in mid-October when the dry season sets in. Rainfalls are very torrential and range between 85 mm and 1150mm p.a. with irregular dry spells occurring in June or July.

=== 1.2.4 Vegetation ===
The vegetation of the district is characterized by savannah woodland and consists mostly of deciduous, widely spaced fire and drought resistant, trees of varying sizes and density with dispersed perennial grasses and associated herbs. Through the activities of man, the woodland savannah has been reduced to open parkland where only trees of economic value like baobab, acacia, sheanut and the dawadawa have been retained with time. These trees satisfy domestic requirements for fuel wood and timber for local housing construction, cattle kraals, vegetable garden fences and materials for handicraft. In the dry season, annual bush fires decimate the grasses and shrubs and as a result, pastures for livestock are largely destroyed. These bush fires also ravage the forest reserves in the district and render them hardly distinguishable from the surrounding vegetation.

=== 1.2.5 Soils ===
The District is developed from five different geological formations namely Granite, Birimian rocks, Voltaian shale, and Old Alluvium of mixed origin and Very Old River Terraces. Out of these, the dominant soil groups in the district are of granite origin. They form the predominant soils in the northern half of the district and more than half of the southern part. The second largest groups of soils are those derived from alluvia of mixed origin and those on very old river terraces. Intense erosion over time has contributed to serious reduction in soil depth and thereby loss of arable surface. The alluvial soils of the south on the whole are very suitable for rice production due to the seasonal flooding in the areas. Most of the soils are suitable for the cultivation of a wide range of savanna grain and tree crops such as millet, maize, sorghum, rice, groundnuts, cotton, Soya beans, guinea-corn, sheanuts, dawadawa and root tubers like potatoes. The well-known Fumbisi valleys consist of a vast tract of land that stretches from southern Fumbisi and Uwasi to Wiesi and Gbedembilisi at the confluence of the Sissili and Kulpawn rivers. The zone has mostly alluvia soils developed from recent and old alluvium of mixed origin as well as those developed on very old river terraces.

== 1.3 Political Administration ==
=== 1.3.1 The Modern Political System ===
The District Assembly has a total membership of twenty-eight Assembly members made up of twenty-two elected members, six appointed members, the ex-officio members being the one Member of Parliament and the District Chief Executive. The present Assembly has four female members, two of whom are elected. There is one Town Council and four Areas councils in the District which include the Fumbisi Town Council, Kanjarga Area Council, Gdedema Area Council and Doninga Area Council. The District Assembly has the following departments in place and functioning under the District Co-ordinating Director. The District Directorate of Health Service, the Ghana Education Service (GES), Department of Community Development, Birth and Deaths Registry, District Environmental Health Unit, Department of Agriculture. The following sub-committees have been constituted and are operational as part of the political and administrative machinery of the district. They are; Finance and Administration, Works, Justice and Security, Development Planning, food security and social service subcommittee. The other committees in the district are: District Security Council, District Tender Committee, District Tender Review Board, Audit Report Implementation Committee and Statutory Planning Committee.

=== 1.3.2 The Traditional Political System ===
The traditional system is governed by the traditional authority through the chiefs. There are eight divisional chiefs in the district supported by their sub-chiefs known in the local parlance as ‘Kanbon-Naba’.

== 1.4 Social and Cultural Structure ==
The traditional political system is administered through the chiefs, to the sub-chiefs and finally, subjects. The head of the traditional council is the Sandem-Naba who is the paramount chief of the entire Builsa Traditional Area.

=== 1.4.1 Social Structure ===
The dominant ethnic group in the district is the Builsa who speak Buli language. However, there are other minority ethnic groups such as Kantonsi, Fulanis, Dagombas, Mossi, Sisalas and Mamprusi among others. All the various ethnic groups coexist peacefully in the district from time immemorial.

=== 1.4.2 Festivals ===
Festivals are significant practices in every community of which the district is no exception. The Fiok Festival is the predominant in Builsa Traditional Area. It is an annual festival celebrated to commemorate the defeat of Babatu and his notorious slave raiders by the ancestors of Builsa in the nineteenth century. The festival usually comes off in the third week of December. In view of its historic importance a number of tourists often participate in the celebration of the festival.

=== 1.4.3 Marriage ===
The traditional marriage system entails a distinctive practice or payment of bride price, a system where the family of the bridegroom carries out some marital obligations including the provision of cola nuts, bottles of schnapps and some amount of money. The bridegroom, apart from the above items, pays a goat or a sheep depending on the capacity of the man, as the final bride price. In other situations, a traditional dance is usually carried out as a prelude to the marriage. The above arrangements seek to strengthen ties between families and ensure the security of marriage.

=== 1.4.4 Inheritance ===
The patrilineal system of inheritance is practiced. The eldest son inherits the deceased father's property in trust of the family. Daughters within the traditional system are denied access to inheritable property.

=== 1.4.5 Funerals ===
A funeral rite is one of the most vital ceremonial activities in the Builsa South district. It is very significant as it indicates the final passage of the deceased to the ancestors or ‘the other world.’ The funeral rite is divided into two sessions. The first referred to as the ‘Kumca’ is performed within the shortest possible time from the time of the death of the person. Burial takes place within that week and some rituals are performed for the deceased. The final funeral rite referred to as the ‘Juuca’ is performed after several successive meetings are held and a consensus is reached between the family heads.

=== 1.4.6 Land Title and Ownership ===
Land in the Builsa North District is not owned by individuals rather the family heads take care of the land on behalf of the family. A chief however oversees the distribution and sale of land. The Tindanas (original natives or first settlers) are the original owners of the land. The land is however transferred from one head of the family to the other upon death. Members of the family can request for a parcel of land for settlement purposes.

=== 1.4.7 Religious Composition ===
The major religious denominations are Christians, Muslims, and Traditionalist. The largest mode of worship is the Traditional African Religion, which makes up 56.4 percent of the population followed by the Christian Religion, 36.8 percent and Moslems constitute 5.1 percent. The traditionalists are mostly found in the rural parts of the district. Their spiritual roles contribute to enhancing peace and development in the district.

== 1.5 Economy ==
1.5.1 Economic Activities/Potentials This section looks at the economic activities carried out in the district. It intends to highlight the opportunities in the various sectors of the district's economy. The agricultural sector employs about 96.0 percent of the population. It is well noted as the food basket of the region cultivating crops such as maize, millet, soya beans, beans, groundnut, and rice among others in commercial quantities. The district has vast arable land for investment in agricultural production.

=== 1.5.2 Social Infrastructure ===
There are a number of social infrastructure that can be found in the district. Some of them are the Senior High School, seventeen Junior High Schools, twenty-eight Primary Schools and twenty-seven kindergartens. The district can boost of a health centre and twelve Community Based Health Planning Services (CHPS) compounds. We cannot discuss issues on social infrastructure without mentioning telecommunication facilities. There are communication network in the district which includes MTN, Telecel, and AT. There is also a Community Bank and a mobile money transfer centre in the district.

== Members of Parliament ==
Election	Member	Party
1992	Norbert Garko Awullay	National Democratic Congress
1996	Norbert Garko Awullay	National Democratic Congress
2000	Abolimbisa Roger Akantagriwen	National Democratic Congress
2004	Abolimbisa Roger Akantagriwen	National Democratic Congress
2008	Alhassan Azong	People's National Convention
2012	Alhassan Azong	People's National Convention
2016	Dr Clement Apaak	National Democratic Congress
2020	Dr Clement Apaak	National Democratic Congress

== Elections ==
Alhassan became the sole PNC member of the 6th Parliament of the Fourth Republic after the 2012 Ghanaian general election on 7 December 2012.

2008 Ghanaian parliamentary election: Builsa South Source:Electoral Commission of Ghana
Party	Candidate	Votes	%	±%
People's National Convention	Alhassan Azong	6,048	47.12	10.62
National Democratic Congress	Abolimbisa Roger Akantagriwen	4,616	35.97	−0.03
New Patriotic Party	Paulina Atiik Morton-Bruce	2,114	16.47	−10.03
Convention People's Party	Daniel Kwallinjam Kunde	56 ¨	0.44	−0.06
Majority		2,502	19.5	19.0
Turnout		13,391	79.91	—

2008 Ghanaian parliamentary election: Builsa South Source:Ghana Home Page
Party	Candidate	Votes	%	±%
People's National Convention	Alhassan Azong	4,047	36.5	+12.5
National Democratic Congress	Abolimbisa Roger Akantagriwen	3,988	36.0	−8.0
New Patriotic Party	Akaachobli Kojo Daniel	2,938	26.5	−4.7
Convention People's Party	Daniel Kwallinjam Kunde	58	0.5	−0.3
Democratic Freedom Party	Gifty Ajavuuk	39	0.4	—
Democratic People's Party	Eric Akaba	22	0.2	−0.5
Majority		59	0.5	−12.3
Turnout				—

2004 Ghanaian parliamentary election: Builsa South Source:National Electoral Commission, Ghana
Party	Candidate	Votes	%	±%
National Democratic Congress	Abolinbisa Roger Akantagriwen	4,820	44.0	—
New Patriotic Party	Theodore Kaboa Ayaric	3,413	31.2	+2.1
People's National Convention	Achianah Joseph Amoabil	2,631	24.0	—
Convention People's Party	Kunde Daniel Collins	83	0.8	—
Majority		1,617	12.8	—
Turnout		11,462	83.8	—

== See also ==
- List of Ghana Parliament constituencies
