= Sylvester Azantilow =

Ghanaian politician (1951–2020)

Member of Parliament for Builsa North
- In office 7 January 1993 – 6 January 1997
- President: Jerry John Rawlings
- Preceded by: New
- Succeeded by: Theodore Basil Anuka

Personal details
- Born: 1951 Upper East Region, Ghana
- Died: 20 July 2020 (aged 68–69)
- Party: National Democratic Congress
- Education: Notre Dame Seminary Senior High School, Navrongo
- Occupation: Politician
- Profession: Imports officer

Sylvester Ateteng Azantilow was a Ghanaian politician and a member of the First Parliament of the Fourth Republic representing the Builsa North Constituency in the Upper East Region of Ghana. He was a member of the National Democratic Congress.

== Early life and education ==
Azantilow was born in the year 1951 in the Upper East Region of Ghana (then Gold Coast). He attended the Notre Dame Seminary Senior High School, Navrongo, where he obtained his GCE Ordinary Level.

== Politics ==
Azantilow was elected into parliament on the ticket of the National Democratic Congress during the 1992 Ghanaian parliamentary election to represent the Builsa North constituency in the Upper East Region. He was succeeded by Theodore Basil Anuka. During the 1996 Ghanaian general election, he polled 12,794 votes out of the total valid votes cast representing 56.10% over his opponents Avaasi Solomon Akumboa who polled 3,440 votes representing 15.10%, Atulisi Alakawon Andrew who polled 837 votes representing 3.70%, Azaanab Waksman Akuobey who polled 524 votes representing 2.30% and George Kwado Amarnah who polled 317 votes representing 1.40%.

== Career ==
Azantilow was an Imports Officer by profession and a former member of parliament for the Builsa North Constituency in the Upper East Region. He was also the Deputy Minister of Youth and Sports.

== Personal life ==
Azantilow was a Christian.

== Death ==
Azantilow died on 20 July 2020 and was buried on 8 August at the Royal Burial Grounds in Sandema.
