= Battle of Sandema =

Battle between Babatu and Builsa people

The Battle of Sandema was a battle in Africa that was fought between Babatu and the people of Sandema. The battle is said to have taken place at a place called Akumcham, where the Builsa united and defeated the leader of the Zabarma warriors.

== History ==
According to historians, Babatu was said to have hailed from Indunga, a town in Niger. He recruited people from Grunshie Mossi, Hausa and Fulani as fighters who took part in slave raids in the Northern Territories. It was said he conquered an area that stretched from Ouagadougou in the north to what is now the Upper East region and certain parts of Northern region in Ghana.

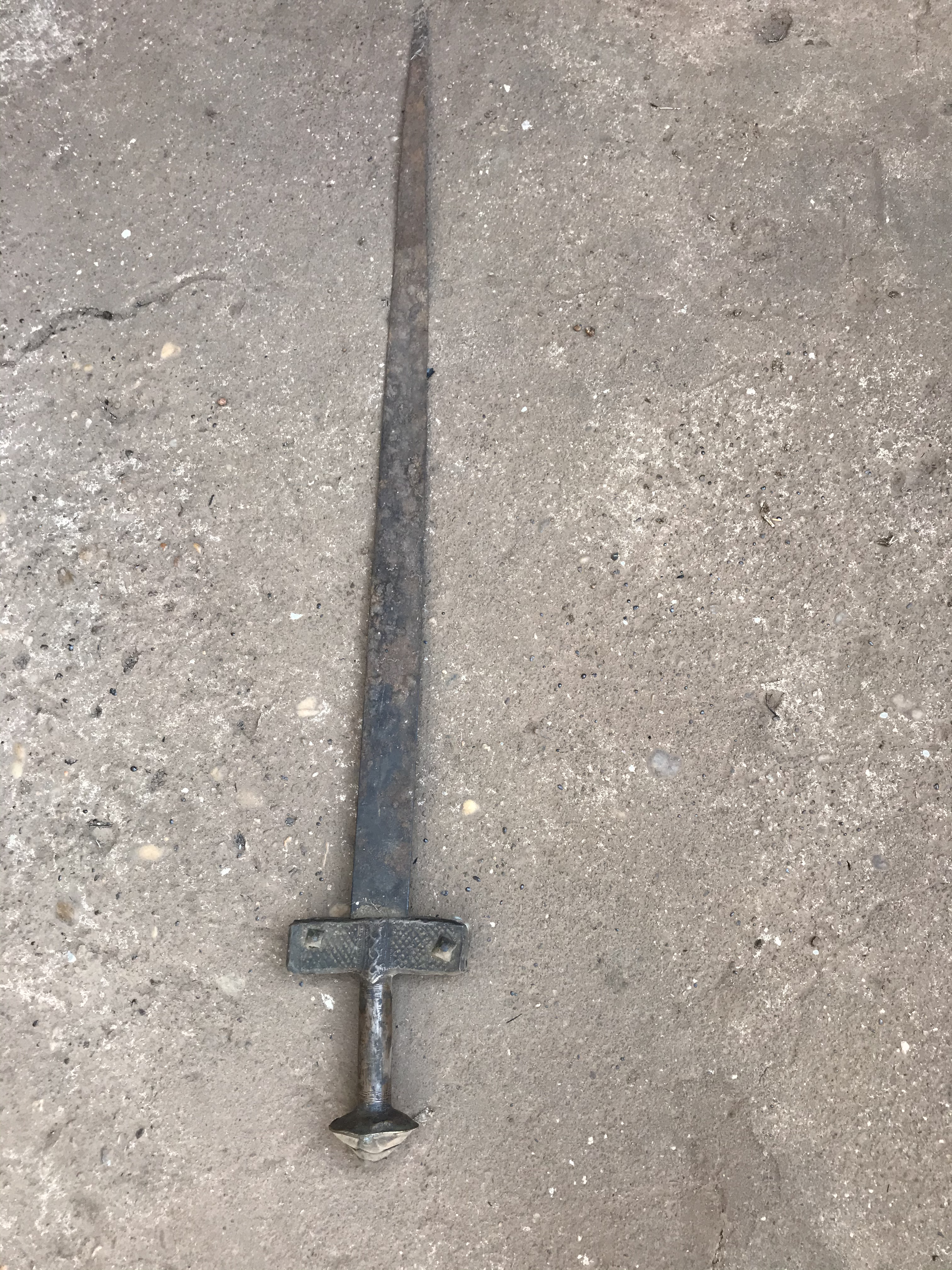
Babatu's sword

It is said Babatu brought the people of Zabarma state to its peak of power and prestige in the late 1880s.

== Background ==
It was said certain events took place before the confrontation between the two sides. Babatu attacked the Builsa for about three months. He captured many warriors of the village of Wiaga as prisoners. Some of the warriors rushed to Sandema and he pursued them. Babatu was defeated in a battle that took place in a hill between Sandema and Fiisa called Azagsuk. The warriors from Navrongo, Fumbisi, and Kunkwa united as one Builsa. The Zabarma were defeated with the help of white men.

It is claimed the battle took place between 1890 and March 1897. Other sources claim it took place between the market and where the current Old Primary School is in 1896.

== Legacy ==
After the Zabarma were defeated, their weapons were collected as relics of war and kept in Fiisa which has a shrine in Sandema. Slaves under Babatu were freed by the Builsa.

The Feok Festival is celebrated every year in the third week of December to mark their victory and encounter with the slave raiders and also the War dance after it became a public event in 1972. The festival means abundance of food.
