= Agnes Chigabatia =

Ghanaian politician (1956–2024)

Hon. Agnes Asangalisa Chigabatia

Member of Parliament for Builsa North Constituency
- In office 7 January 2005 – 6 January 2009
- President: John Kufuor

Personal details
- Born: 20 October 1956 Chuchuliga, Gold Coast (now Ghana)
- Died: 9 January 2024 (aged 67)
- Party: New Patriotic Party

Agnes Asangalisa Chigabatia (20 October 1956 – 9 January 2024) was a Ghanaian politician who was a member of the parliament for Builsa North Constituency.

== Early life and education ==
Agnes Chigabatia was born on 20 October 1956 at Chuchuliga, Gold Coast (now Upper East Region, Ghana). She acquired her middle school education at Adda Middle School in Navrongo and Ayieta Middle School in Sandema. Chigabatia later had her secondary school education at St. Francis Girls' Senior High School, Jirapa. She furthered her education at the Accra Polytechnic where she acquired a Certificate at the Advanced Level in Catering.

== Career ==
Chigabatia was a caterer by profession.

== Politics ==
Agnes Chigabatia contested in the 2004 parliamentary elections on the ticket of the New Patriotic Party which she won. She pulled a total vote of 6,160 representing 33.70%. She served for a period of four years (7 January 2005 – 7 January 2009).

Within this same period, Chigabatia was also the Deputy Minister for the Upper East Region. Chigabatia lost her position as member of parliament during the 2008 election where she lost to Timothy Awotiirim Ataboadey.

== Elections ==
Chigabatia was elected as the member of parliament for the Builsa North constituency of the Upper East Region of Ghana for the first time in the 2004 Ghanaian general elections. She won on the ticket of the New Patriotic Party.

Her constituency was a part of the 2 parliamentary seats out of 13 seats won by the New Patriotic Party in that election for the Upper East Region. The New Patriotic Party won a majority total of 128 parliamentary seats out of 230 seats. She was elected with 6,160 votes out of 18,273 total valid votes cast. This was equivalent to 33.7% of total valid votes cast. She was elected over Thomas Akum-Yong of the Peoples’ National Convention, Awontiirim Ataboadey Timothy of the National Democratic Congress and Abaayiak Ayulim Grace of the Convention People's Party. These obtained 5,657, 6,147 and 309 votes respectively out of the total valid votes cast. These were equivalent to 31%, 33.6% and 1.7% respectively of total valid votes cast.

== Personal life and death ==
Agnes Chigabatia was a Christian. She died on 9 January 2024, at the age of 67.
