= Stephen Ayidiya =

Ghanaian politician

Member of the Ghana Parliament for Chiana-Paga
- In office 7 January 1993 – 6 January 1997
- President: Jerry John Rawlings
- Preceded by: Kubaje Andrea Amidila
- Succeeded by: Abuga Pele

Personal details
- Born: 1 May 1951 (age 75) Upper East Region, Ghana
- Party: National Democratic Congress
- Education: Notre Dame Seminary Senior High School, Navrongo
- Alma mater: University of Ghana; University of Akron
- Occupation: Politician
- Profession: University Lecturer

Stephen Ayidiya (born May 1, 1951) is a Ghanaian politician and a member of the First Parliament of the Fourth Republic representing the Chiana-Paga Constituency in the Upper East Region of Ghana. He represented the National Democratic Congress.

== Early life and education ==
Ayidiya was born on the 1 May 1952 in the Upper East Region of Ghana. He attended the Notre Dame Seminary Senior High School, Navrongo, the University of Ghana and the University of Akron where he obtained a Doctor of Philosophy.

== Politics ==
Ayidiya was first elected into Parliament on the ticket of the National Democratic Congress (NDC) during the 1992 Ghanaian parliamentary election to represent the Chiana-Paga Constituency in the Upper East Region of Ghana. He was succeeded by Abugu Pele during the NDC Parliamentary Primaries. Pele polled 19,362 votes out of the total valid votes cast representing 48.20% during the 1996 Ghanaian general election over his opponent Achinan Apiyese James of the Convention People's Party.

== Career ==
Ayidiya is a University Lecturer by profession and a former member of parliament for the Chiana-Paga Constituency in the Upper East Region of Ghana.

== Personal life ==
He is a Christian.
