= Battle of Kanjaga =

Battle in Africa between Babatu and Ameria

Date	14 March 1897
Location	Northern Ghana
Result	Kanjaga victory

Belligerents
Zabarma Emirate	Kanjaga people

Commanders and leaders
Babatu	ameria

The Battle of Kanjaga was a battle in Africa that was fought between Babatu and the people of Kanjaga. The battle was claimed to have taken place on 14 March 1897. Babatu and his warriors were defeated by the unified forces of Ameria and the French.

== History ==
Babatu initially attacked the people of Kanjaga, defeated them and took their chief called Amnu as captive. Babatu fought with another enemy who was from his ranks called Ameria or Hamaria. Ameria was captured from his home town of Santejan by the Zabarma when he was a young. Ameria was sometimes successful in battles against his former boss. Ameria called himself 'King of the Gurunsi'. It was claimed he rebelled against Babatu because of woman.
