= James Agalga =

Ghanaian politician

Hon. James Agalga
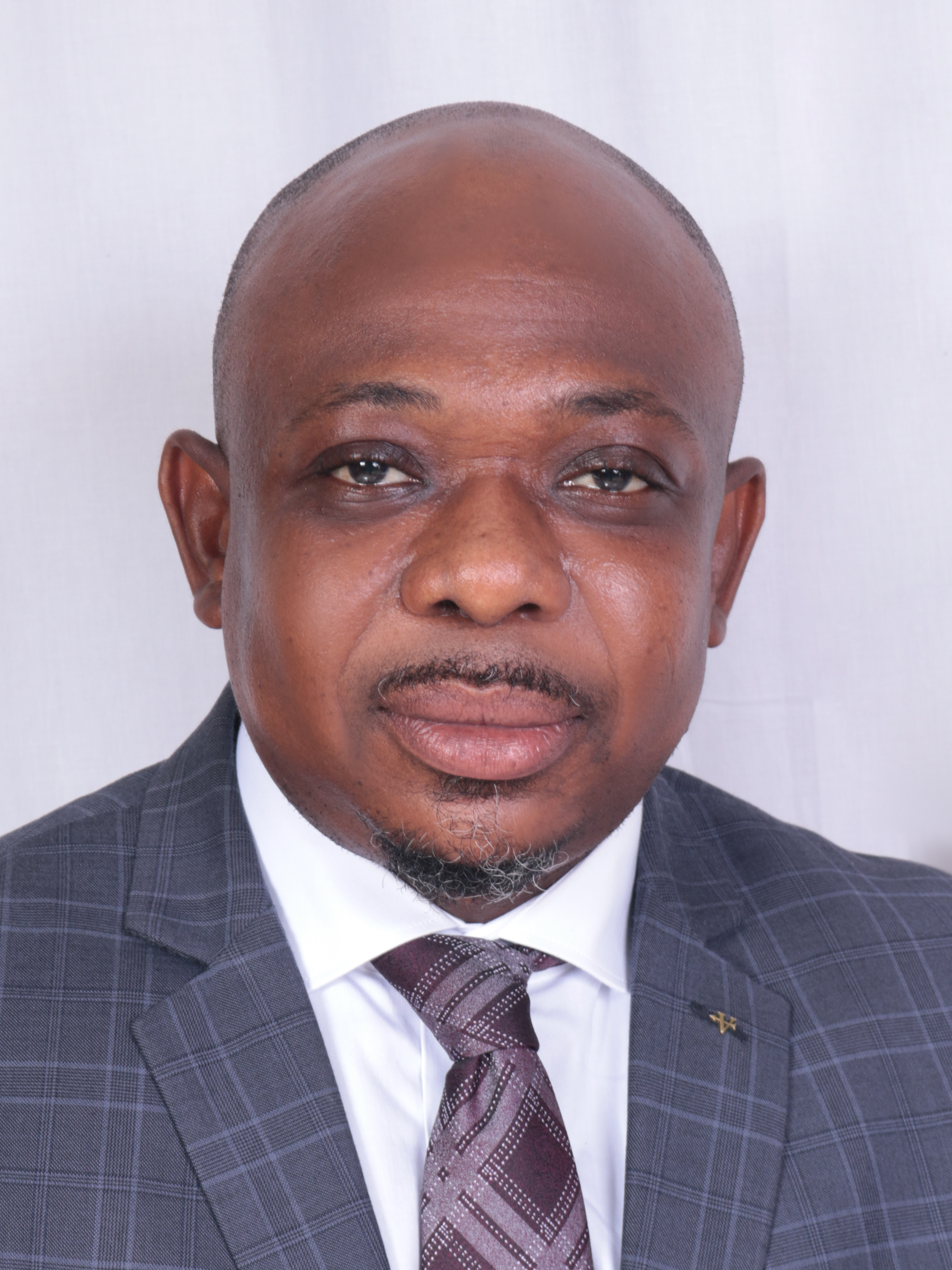

Member of the Ghana Parliament for Builsa North Constituency
- In office 7 January 2013 – present

Personal details
- Born: 10 June 1979 (age 47) Chuchuliga
- Party: National Democratic Congress
- Spouse: Irene
- Children: Florence and James Jr.
- Education: University of Ghana Navrongo Senior High School
- Occupation: Member of Parliament
- Profession: Lawyer

James Agalga is a Ghanaian politician and member of the Seventh Parliament of the Fourth Republic of Ghana representing the Builsa North Constituency in the Upper East Region on the ticket of the National Democratic Congress. Agalga was the Deputy Minister for Interior under the John Mahama Administration. He is currently the Deputy Ranking Member on Parliament's Defense and Interior Committee.

== Early life and education ==
James was born in Chuchuliga in the Upper East Region of Ghana on 10 June 1979. He attended University of Ghana where he graduated with LLB Hons in 2002. He also obtained his B.L from the Ghana School of Law in 2004. He also graduated with an M.A in Conflict, Peace and Security in 2018.

== Politics ==
He is a member of the National Democratic Congress.

== Career ==
He was the Managing Partner of Law Temple from 2008 to 2013. He was an Associate at the Center for Public Interest Law. He was also the Barrister at NDEZEB Law Consult.

== Personal life ==
He is a Catholic.

== Committees ==
He was part of the Members Holding Offices of Profit Committee, Constitutional, Legal and Parliamentary Affairs Committee and also Appointments Committee under the 6th Parliament of Ghana.
