= Allowe Leo Kabah =

Ghanaian politician and lawyer

Kabah (born on 11 April 1951) is a Ghanaian politician and a lawyer. He was also a member of parliament for the Chiana-Paga Constituency of the Upper East Region of Ghana.

== Early life and education ==
Allowe Leo Kabah was born on April 11, 1951, in Paga in the Upper East Region. He obtained a Bachelor of Arts in Psychology with Political Science from the University of Ghana in 1977 and further had his Bachelor of Law (BL) from the Ghana School of Law (GSL) in 2004.

== Career ==
Kabah was a lawyer by profession. He was the National Coordinator for the National Youth Employment Program(NYEP).

== Politics ==
Kabah was a member of the New Patriotic Party. He was the member of parliament for the Chiana-Paga Constituency in the Upper East region of Ghana representing the Fifth Parliament of the Fourth Republic of Ghana. His political career began when he contested in the 2008 Ghanaian general Election and obtained a total of 8,323 votes out of the 27,839 valid votes cast representing 29.9%. However, in 2012 he lost the seat in the 2012 Ghanaian general election to a candidate of National Democratic Congress (NDC) Abuga Pele.

== Personal life ==
He is married with four children. He is a Christian and worships at the Living Chapel International.
