= Norbert Garko Awulley =

Ghanaian politician

MP for Builsa South
- In office 7 January 1993 – 6 January 2005
- Preceded by: New
- Succeeded by: Abolimbisa Roger Akantagriwen

Personal details
- Born: 22 June 1954 (age 72) Upper East Region, Ghana
- Party: National Democratic Congress
- Education: Gbewaa College of Education; Institute of Social Science, Moscow
- Occupation: Politician
- Profession: Teacher

Norbert Garko Awulley (born 22 June 1954) is a Ghanaian politician and a member of the first, second and third Parliament of the fourth Republic representing the Builsa South constituency in Upper East Region of Ghana.

== Early life and education ==
Norbert Garko Awulley was born on 22 June 1954 in the Upper East Region of Ghana (then Gold Coast). He had his secondary education at the Tamale School of Commerce, where he obtained his GCE Ordinary and Advanced Level Certificates and continued at the Gbewaa Training College, where he was awarded a Teachers' Training Certificate. He later attended the Institute of Social Science, Moscow and obtained a Diploma in Social Science.

== Politics ==
Awulley was first elected into Parliament on the ticket of the National Democratic Congress during the 1992 Ghanaian parliamentary election to represent the Builsa South constituency in the Upper East Region of Ghana. He won once again in 1996 with 7,202 votes out of the total valid votes cast representing 50.80%. He won the seat in the 2000 Ghanaian general election with 4,690 votes out of the total valid votes cast representing 52.40% over his opponents Achianah J. Amoabil who polled 3,467 votes representing 38.70%, Kanbonaba H. Abeka who polled 445 votes representing 5.00%, Adama Bawah who polled 211 votes representing 2.40% and Atukpok Angabe who polled 145 votes representing 1.60%. He lost his Seat to Abolimbisa Roger Akantagriwen during the 2004 Ghanaian general election.

== Career ==
Awulley is a teacher by profession and a former member of parliament for the Builsa South Constituency in the Upper East Region of Ghana.

== Personal life ==
He is a Christian.
