= Nasa, Ghana =

Village in Ghana

Coordinates: 10°08′16″N 2°21′15″W

Nasa is a village in Ghana in the historic Kingdom of Wala in the current Upper West Region of Ghana. It is 14 miles northeast of Wa, Ghana.

Prior to the dry season of 1887-1888 Nasa was a very substantial town. During that dry season it was raided by the forces of the Zabarima (emirate) under the command of Babatu. This caused a mass exodus of much of the population and left behind a large area outside the village with much urban debris. Among other buildings destroyed by the forces of Babatu was the town's mosque.

The first recorded population for Nasa was 149 in 1931. In 1948 its population was reported as 289. In the 1960 census it had a population of 136. In 1970 there were 216 inhabitants.

== Sources ==
- Wilks, Ivor (1989). Wa and the Wala: Islam and Polity in Northwestern Ghana. Cambridge: Cambridge University Press. pp. 56–57. ISBN 9780521894340.
