= Kalibi Festival =

Festival in Ghana by the Sankana people

Kalibi Festival is an annual festival celebrated by the chiefs and people of Sankana, a town in the Nadowli-Kaleo district in the Upper West Region of Ghana. It is usually celebrated in the month of April. A festival highlight is the durbar of chiefs, which is a ceremonial gathering that showcases the traditions of the Sankana people.

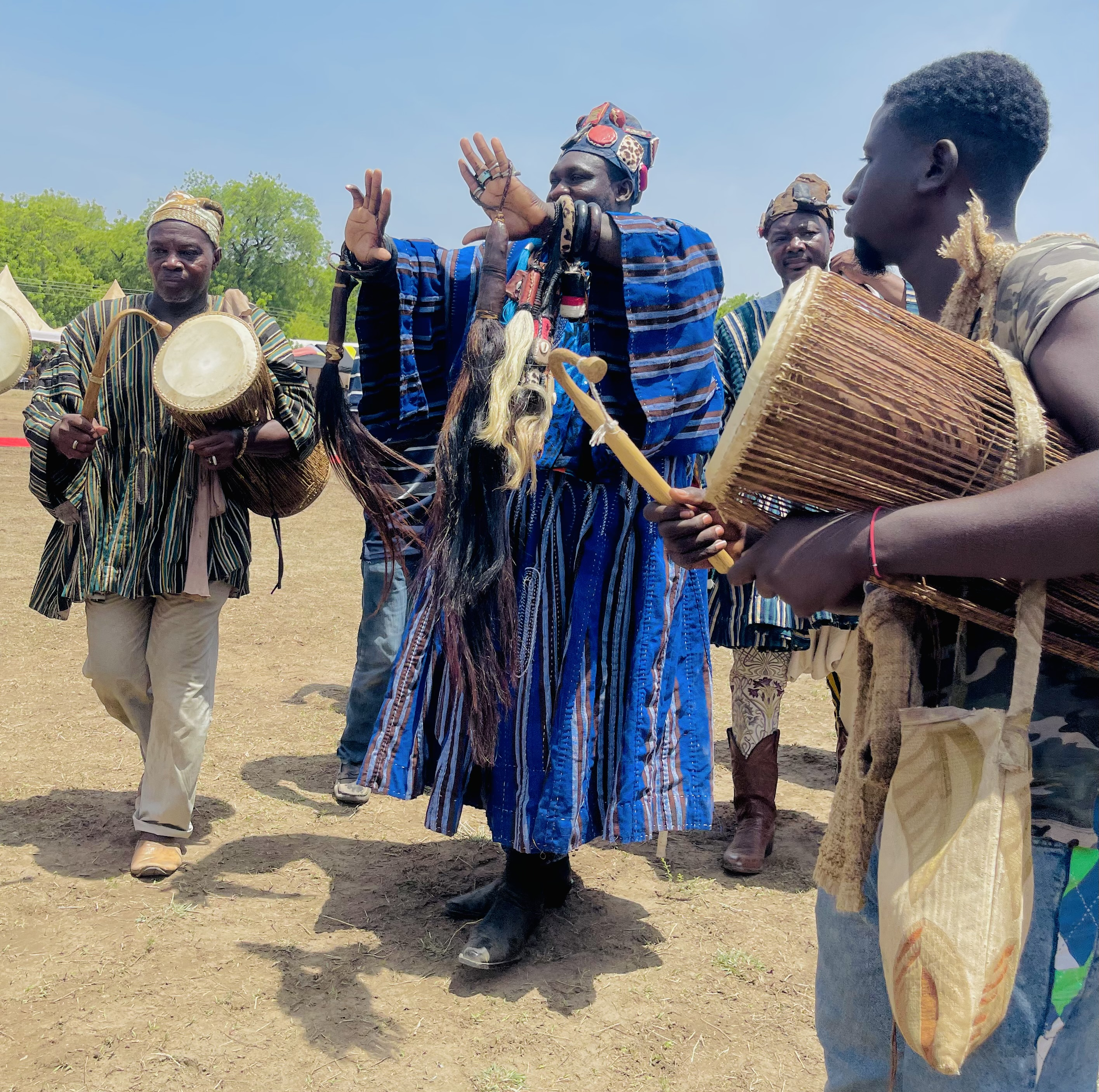

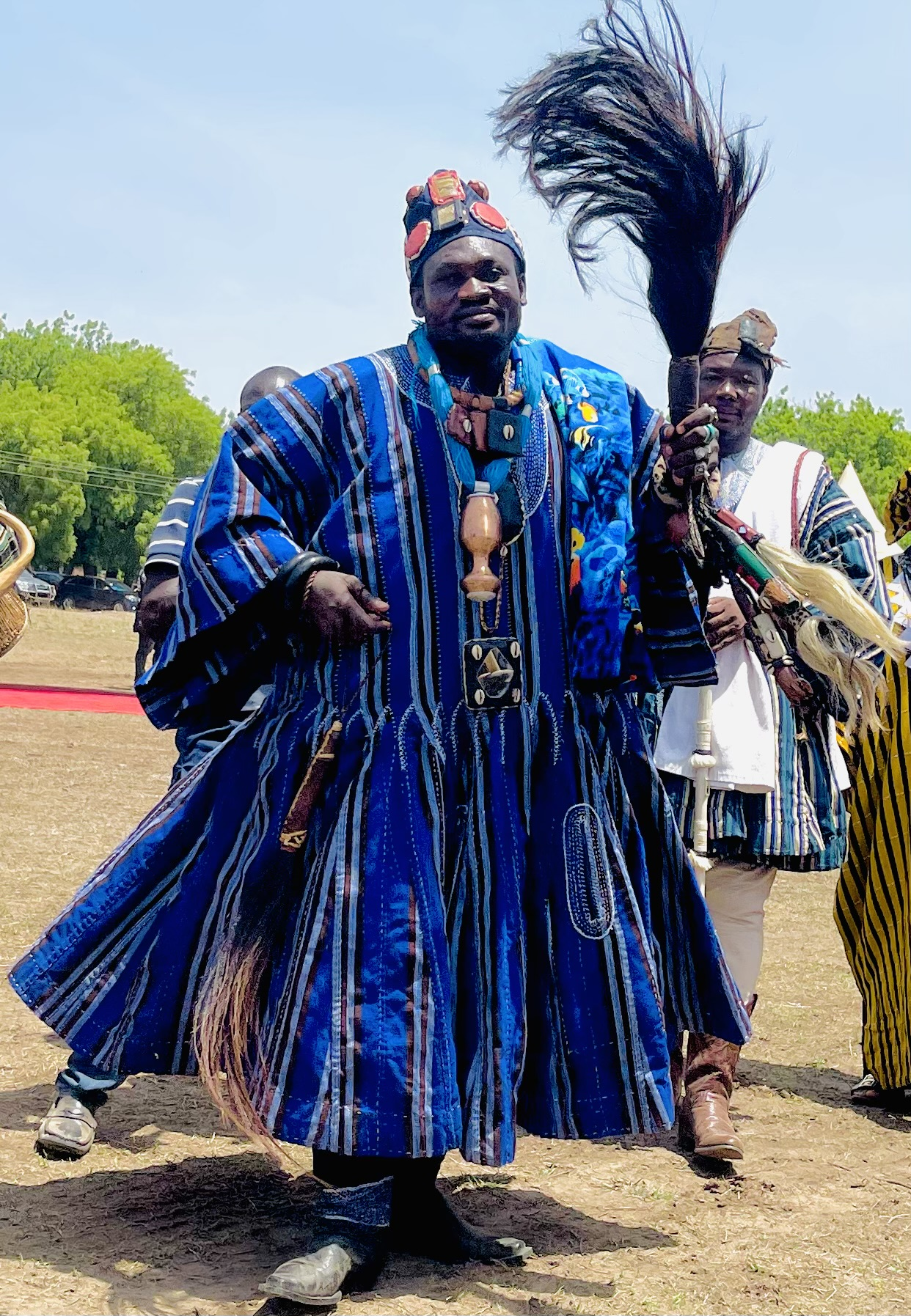

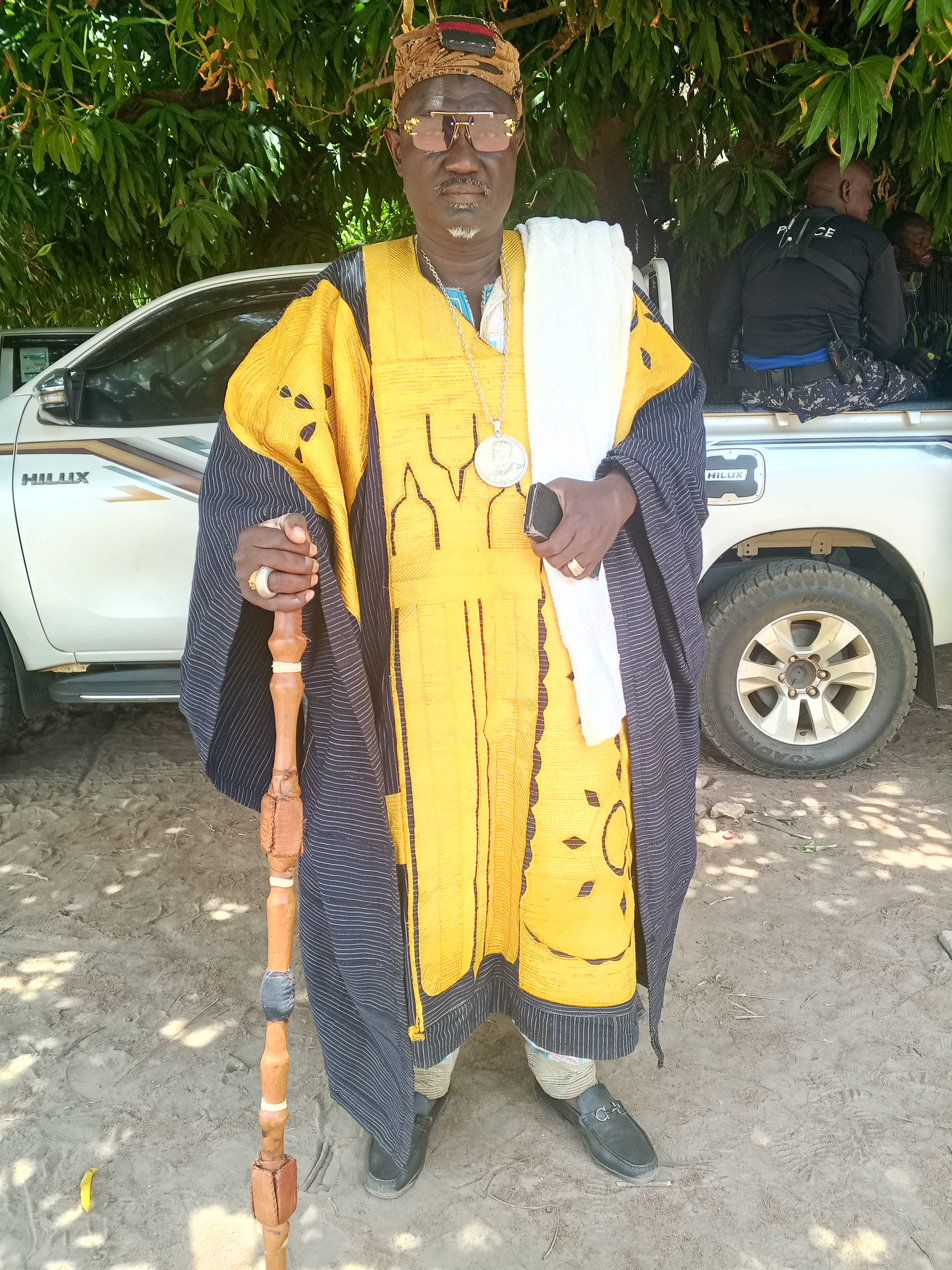

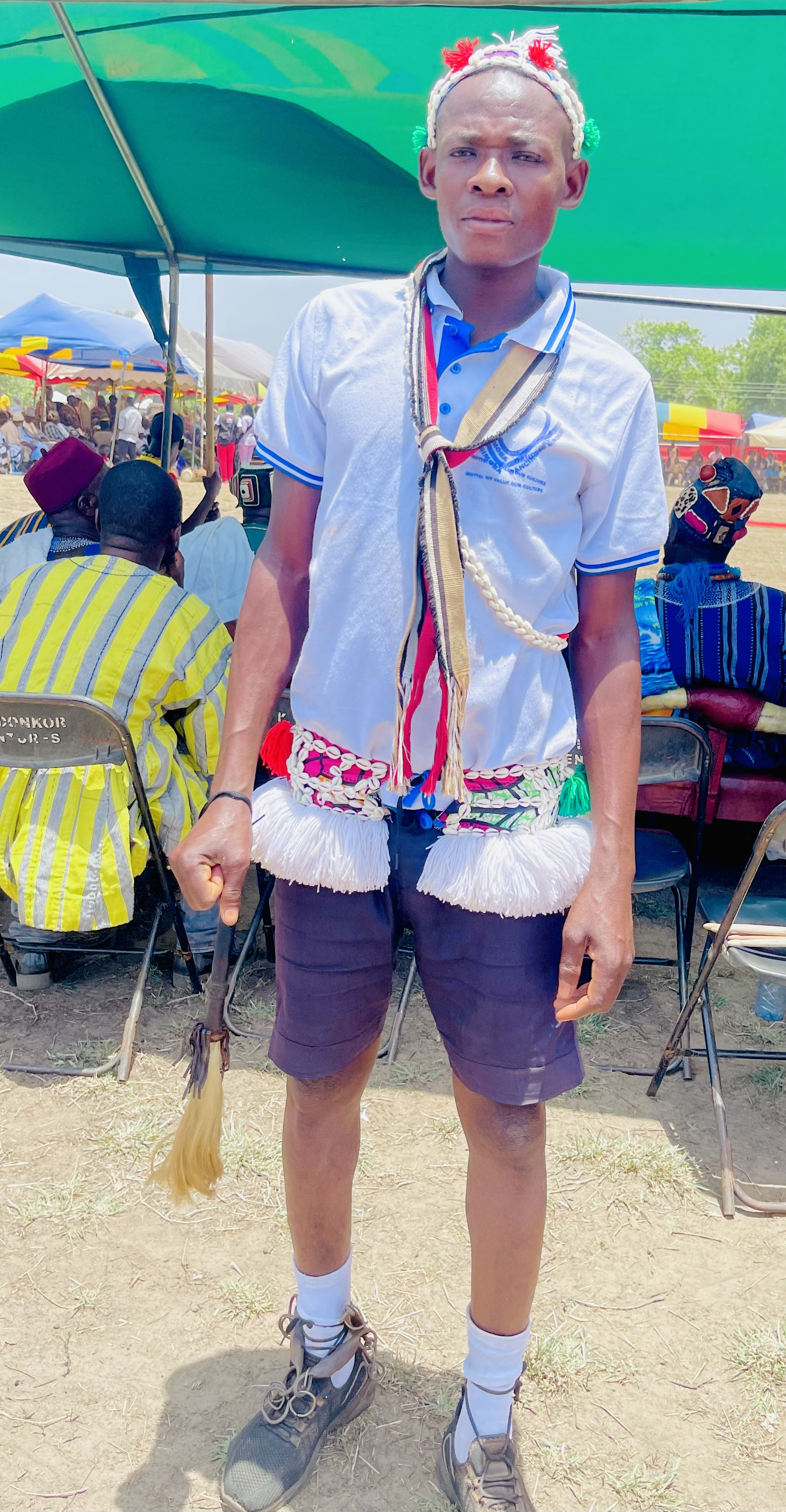

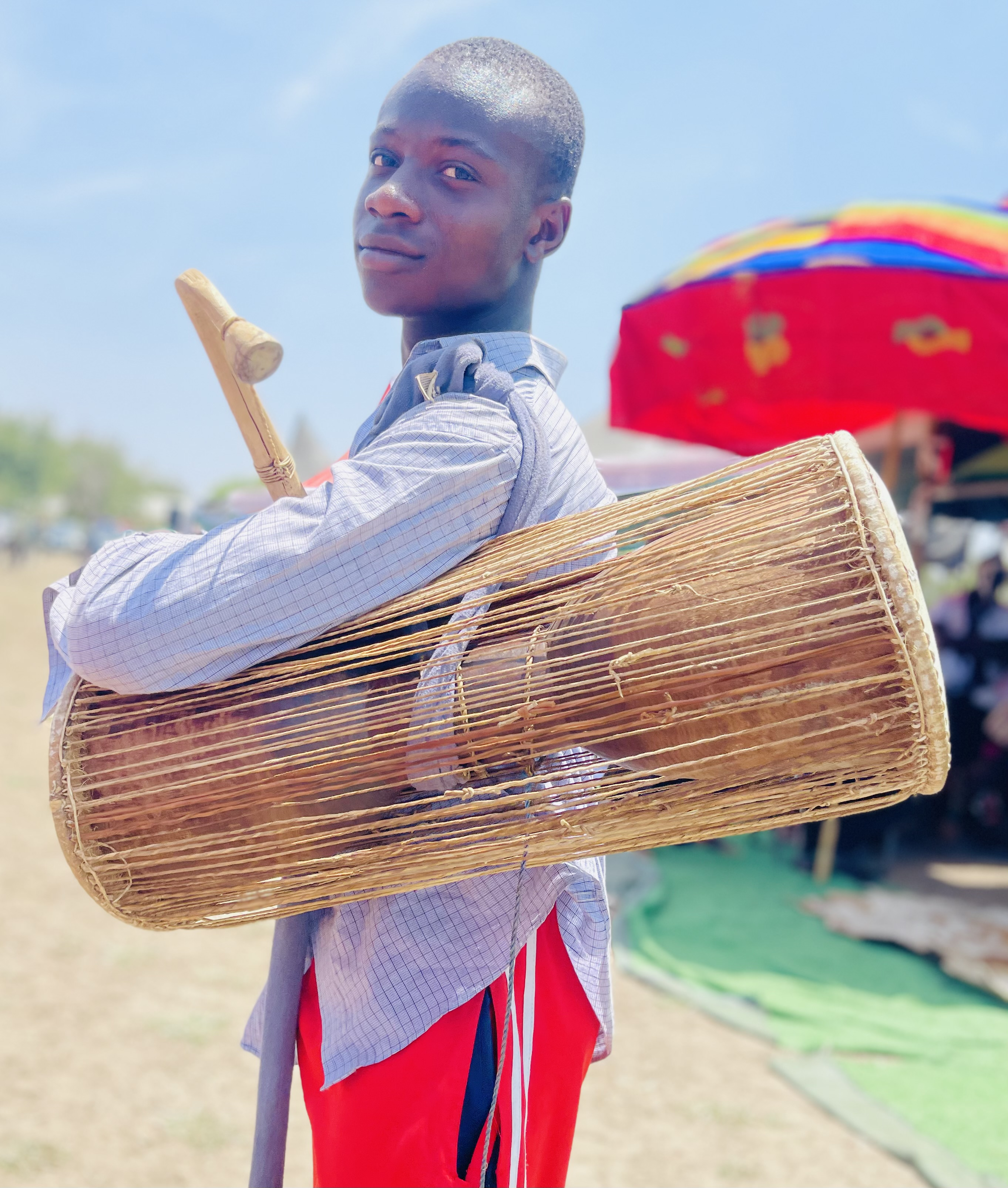

== Celebrations ==
During the festival, visitors are welcomed to share food and drinks. The people put on traditional clothes and there is a durbar of chiefs, as well as dancing and drumming.

== Significance ==
This festival is celebrated to commemorate the victory of the local people over the slave raiders led by Babatu and Samori in 1896. It also serves as an occasion where the ancestors are asked for good health and prosperity.
