= Builsa North Municipal District =

Municipal District in Upper East Region, Ghana

Builsa North Municipal District Buluk
- Municipal District
- Districts of Upper East Region

- Location of Builsa North Municipal District within Upper East
- Coordinates: 10°44′5″N 1°17′26″W
- Country: Ghana
- Region: Upper East
- Capital: Sandema

Government
  - Member of Parliament: Hon. James Agalga

Area
  - Total: 1,946 km^{2} (751 sq mi)

Population (2021)
  - Total: 56,571
  - Density: 29.07/km^{2} (75.29/sq mi)
- Time zone: UTC+0 (GMT)
- ISO 3166 code: GH-UE-BN

Builsa North Municipal District is one of the fifteen districts in Upper East Region, Ghana. Originally it was formerly part of the then-larger Builsa District in 1988, until the southern part of the district was split off to create Builsa South District on 29 February 2008; thus the remaining part was renamed Builsa North District, which was later elevated to municipal district assembly status on 19 December 2018 to become Builsa North Municipal District. The municipality is located in the western part of Upper East Region and has Sandema as its capital town.

== Demographics ==
The majority of the inhabitants are of the Bulisa tribe, the original early settlers of the area, who speak Buli. It also has a significant population of the Kantosi, who dominantly reside in Sandema.

== Education ==
There are numerous basic schools in Builsa North Municipality, including three Senior High Schools (SHS) of which two are public i.e. the Sandema Senior High School and the Sandema Senior High Technical School. The third privately owned is the Wiaga Senior High School, a community SHS in Wiaga. The Youth Leadership Training Institute is a vocational institution also located in Sandema, the district capital.

== Economy ==
The economic structure of the Builsa North District is dominated by an agrarian subsistence economy. Industry is scarce, and tourism has not yet developed.

== Villages ==
The capital and largest town in the Builsa North District is Sandema. The Builsa North District encompasses the following villages:

- Bachonsa
- Chuchuliga
- Doninga
- Fumbisi
- Gbedema
- Gbedembilisi
- Kadema
- Kanjarga
- Siniensi
- Uwasa
- Vaari
- Wiaga
- Wiesi

== Sources ==
- "Districts of Ghana". Statoids.
- GhanaDistricts.com
