= Fumbisi Senior High School =

High school in Ghana

Fumbisi Senior High/Agric School

Location
- Fumbisi, Upper East Region; Ghana
- 10.454°N 1.294°W

Information
- Type: Secondary/high school
- Established: 1991 (35 years ago)
- Grades: Forms [1-3]

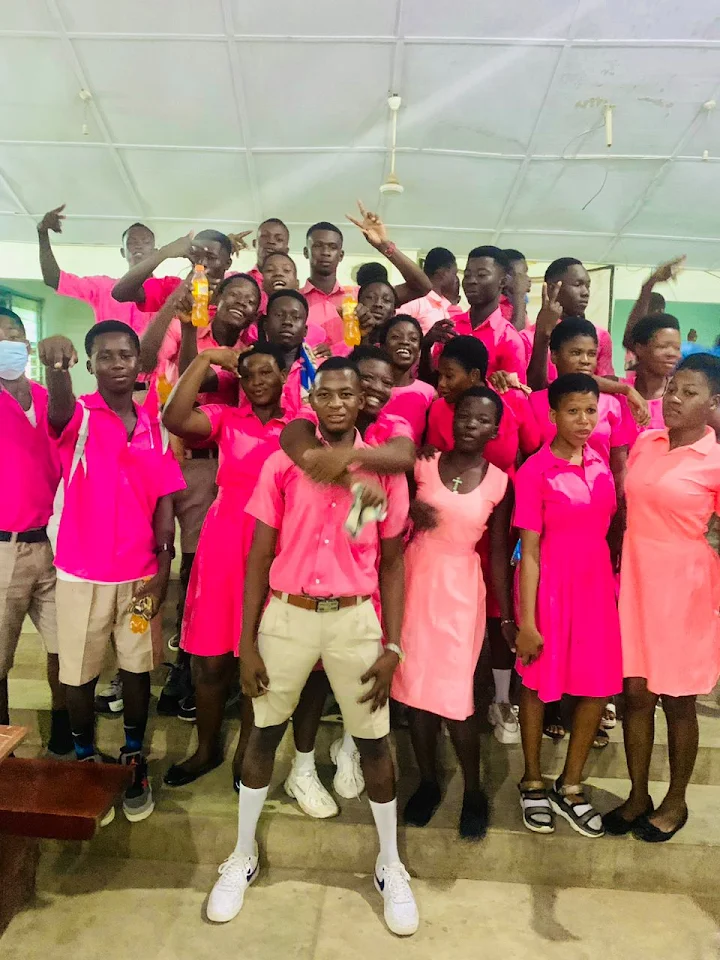
2023/24 School prefects

Fumbisi Senior High/Agric School is a second cycle institution in Fumbisi in the Builsa South District in the Upper East Region of Ghana. The school offers courses like Agriculture, General Arts, Home Economics, Business, Science, Visual Arts. It is a day/boarding school. The houses in the school are Mahama house, Rawlings house, Kofi Annan house, and Limann house. The school code is 0090302.

== Courses offered ==
- Agriculture
- Business
- Home Economics
- General Arts
- General Science
- Visual arts

== History ==
The school was established in 1991. In the 2018/19 academic year, the number of third-year students, second-year students, and first-year students were 529, 544, and 450 respectively. In 2018, the headmaster of the school was Francis Adajagsa. In 2019, the headmaster of the school was Cletus Aruk. The headmaster of the school is Michael Adaapiim who replaced Cletus Aruk after his retirement from 2023.

== Achievements ==
- Under Headmaster Francis Adajagsa: Led the school to win five trophies, including Girls Volleyball, Cross Country, STUDAFEST, and two "Well Behaved School" awards.
- Academic Success: Five students who passed through the newly introduced General Science course received special admissions to KNUST to pursue various science programs.

== Information ==
- No. of Students (SHS 1): 830
- No. of Students (SHS 2): 530
- No. of Students (SHS 3): 539
- EMIS Code: 207110001
- WAEC Code: 0090302
- School type: Public Senior High School
- Established: 1991
- School district: Builsa South District
- Headmaster: Cletus Aruk (current); previous heads include Francis Adajagsa and Roger Regis Abapol
- Category: C
- Gender: Coeducational (Mixed)
- Accommodation status: Day and Boarding
- Location: About 1 km east of Fumbisi township
