= Thomas Adda Dalu =

Ghanaian politician

Hon Thomas Adda Dalu
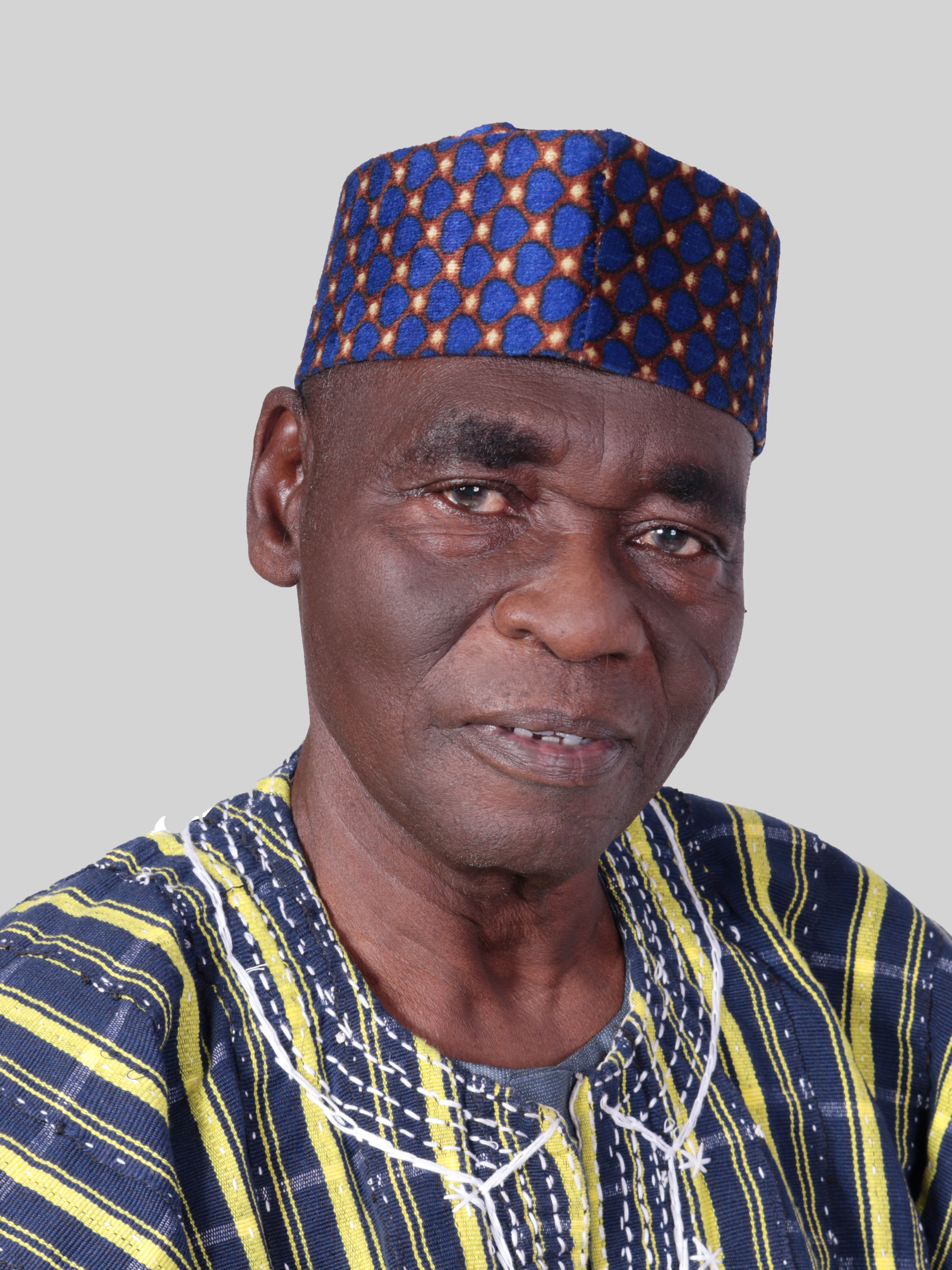

Member of the Ghana Parliament for Chiana-Paga Constituency
- Incumbent
- Assumed office 7 January 2021

Personal details
- Born: Thomas Adda Dalu; 1 January 1956 (age 70) Chiana, Kassena-Nankana West District, Upper East Region, Ghana
- Party: National Democratic Congress
- Occupation: Politician
- Committees: Foreign Affairs Committee

Thomas Adda Dalu (born 1 January 1956) is a Ghanaian politician and member of the National Democratic Congress. He is the member of parliament for the Chiana-Paga Constituency in the Upper East Region of Ghana.

== Early life and education ==
Dalu hails from Chiana. He holds an MBA in Govern and Leadership

== Personal life ==
Thomas Adda Dalu is a Christian.
