= Theodore Basil Anuka =

Ghanaian politician

Hon. Theodore Basil Anuka

Member of Parliament for Builsa North Constituency
- In office 7 January 2001 – 6 January 2005
- President: John Kufuor

Personal details
- Party: National Democratic Congress

Theodore Basil Anuka is a Ghanaian politician and a member of the 2nd and 3rd parliament of the 4th republic of Ghana. He is a former member of Parliament for the Builsa North constituency in the Upper East Region and a member of the National Democratic Congress political party in Ghana.

== Politics ==
Anuka was a member of the 2nd and 3rd parliament of the 4th republic of Ghana. He is a member of the National Democratic Congress. He represented the political party at the Builsa North constituency of the Upper East Region of Ghana. His political career began when he contested in the 1996 Ghanaian General elections and won on the ticket of the National Democratic Congress. He polled 12,794 votes out of the 17,912 valid votes cast representing 56.10% over Avaasi Solomon Akumboa who polled 3,440 votes representing 15.10%, Atulisi Alakawon Andrew who polled 837 votes representing 3.70%, Azaanab Waksman Akuobey who polled 524 votes representing 2.30% and George Kwadwo Amarnah who polled 317 votes 1.40%.

=== 2000 Elections ===
Anuka was elected as the member of parliament for the Builsa North constituency in the 2000 Ghanaian general elections. He won the elections on the ticket of the National Democratic Congress. His constituency was a part of the 8 parliamentary seats out of 12 seats won by the National Democratic Congress in that election for the Western Region. The National Democratic Congress won a minority total of 92 parliamentary seats out of 200 seats in the 3rd parliament of the 4th republic of Ghana. He was elected with 6,280 votes out of 16,109 total valid votes cast. This was equivalent to 42.2% of the total valid votes cast. He was elected over Agbaadem J.B. Stanny of the People's National Convention, Azagsuk Azantilow of the New Patriotic Party, and Grace A. Abaayiak of the Convention People's Party. These obtained 5,858, 2,162 and 591 votes respectively out of the total valid votes cast. These were equivalent to 39.3%, 14.5% and 4.0% respectively of total valid votes cast.

== See also ==
- List of MPs elected in the 2000 Ghanaian parliamentary election
