= Alhassan Azong =

Ghanaian politician

Hon. Alhassan Azong

Member of the Ghana Parliament for Builsa South
- Incumbent
- Assumed office 7 January 2009
- Preceded by: Abolimbisa Roger Akantagriwen

Minister of state (Public Sector Reform)
- In office 2009–2013
- President: John Atta Mills

Personal details
- Born: 18 December 1965 (age 60)
- Party: People's National Convention
- Children: 6
- Education: Paris Graduate School of Management
- Profession: Educationist/teacher
- Committees: Members Holding Offices of Profit Committee; Education Youth, Sports and Culture Committee; Standing Orders Committee

Alhassan Azong (born 18 December 1965) is a Ghanaian politician and the Member of Parliament (MP) for the Builsa South constituency in Ghana. He was also a Minister of state in the Mills government between 2009 and 2013.

== Early life ==
Azong was born on 18 December 1965. He hails from Wiesi in the Upper East Region of Ghana. He acquired the ACIS in 1996. He also attended the Paris Graduate School of Management where he obtained an MBA. He later became a lecturer at the Bolgatanga Polytechnic, a position he held until he went into politics.

== Politics ==
Azong first contested the Builsa South seat in the December 2008 on the ticket of the People's National Convention, winning by the narrow margin of 59 votes (0.5%). He served on the Committee on Members Holding Offices of Profit, Education Youth, Sports and Culture Committee and the Standing Orders Committee. In the following election in December 2012, his majority increased to 6,048 (47.12). He thus became the sole PNC MP in the 6th Parliament of the Fourth Republic of Ghana.

Although he was not a member of the NDC, Azong was appointed Minister of state responsible for Public Sector Reform by President Mills in the NDC government from 2009 to 2013. In 2013, he was renominated by President Mahama as the Minister of State in charge of Public Sector Reforms, the same portfolio he held under the Mills government.

== Personal life ==
Azong is a Muslim. He is married with six children.

== Employment ==
- Lecturer, Bolgatanga Polytechnic

== See also ==
- List of Mills government ministers
- List of Mahama government ministers

Parliament of Ghana
Preceded by Abolimbisa Roger Akantagriwen	Builsa South; 2009 – present	Incumbent
