= Catherine Katuni Tedam =

Ghanaian politician

Hon. Catherine Katuni Tedam

Member of the Ghana Parliament for Chiana-Paga
- In office March 1970 – January 1972
- Preceded by: Constituency abolished
- Succeeded by: Kubaje Andrea Amidila

Personal details
- Born: 15 March 1944 (age 82) Paga
- Party: Progress Party
- Relations: C. K. Tedam (Uncle)

Catherine Katuni Tedam is a Ghanaian teacher and politician. She served as the member of parliament for the Chiana-Paga constituency from 1970 to 1972. She was one of only two women in the Second Republican parliament.

== Early life and education ==
Tedam was born on 15 March 1944 in Paga. She had her early education at the Local Council Primary School in Paga from 1951 to 1956 and the Girls' Middle Boarding School in Bolgatanga from 1957 to 1960. She entered the Women's Teacher Training College in Tamale to train as a teacher from 1961 to 1965.

== Career ==
Following her teacher training at the Women's Teacher Training College in 1965, she gained employment at the Local Authority Primary School Paga. She taught there until 1966 when she joined the teaching staff of the Akantome Middle School in Bolgatanga. She taught there for a year as well and moved to Abiba Middle School also in Bolgatanga teaching for a year once again. In 1969 she taught at Adabase Primary School also in Bolgatanga until she entered parliament in 1970. While in the teaching profession, Catherine was a National Executive member of the Elementary Teachers' Association from 1966 to 1969.

== Politics ==
Catherine became a member of the Financial Board of Chiana-Paga Local Council in 1968. During the second republic, certain candidates were disqualified from contesting in the 1969 elections due to their connection with the government of the First Republic. One of the candidates was Clement Kubindiwo Tedam (C. K. Tedam) who served as the member of parliament for the Paga constituency during the First Republic. C. K. Tedam was to contest for the Chiana-Paga seat but his disqualification resulted in the seat becoming vacant. A by-election was held in March 1970 and Catherine who was the niece of C. K. Tedam contested for the seat on the ticket of the Progress Party and won. While in parliament she served on various committees, some of which include; the House Committee, the Committee on Education, the Health Committee, and the Rural and Social Development Committee.

== Personal life ==
Catherine is a Catholic. she loves to read and listen to music during her leisure time. She also enjoyed playing netball and hockey.

== See also ==
- List of MPs elected in the 1969 Ghanaian parliamentary election
- Busia government
