= Clement Abas Apaak =

Ghanaian politician

Hon. Clement Abas Apaak MP
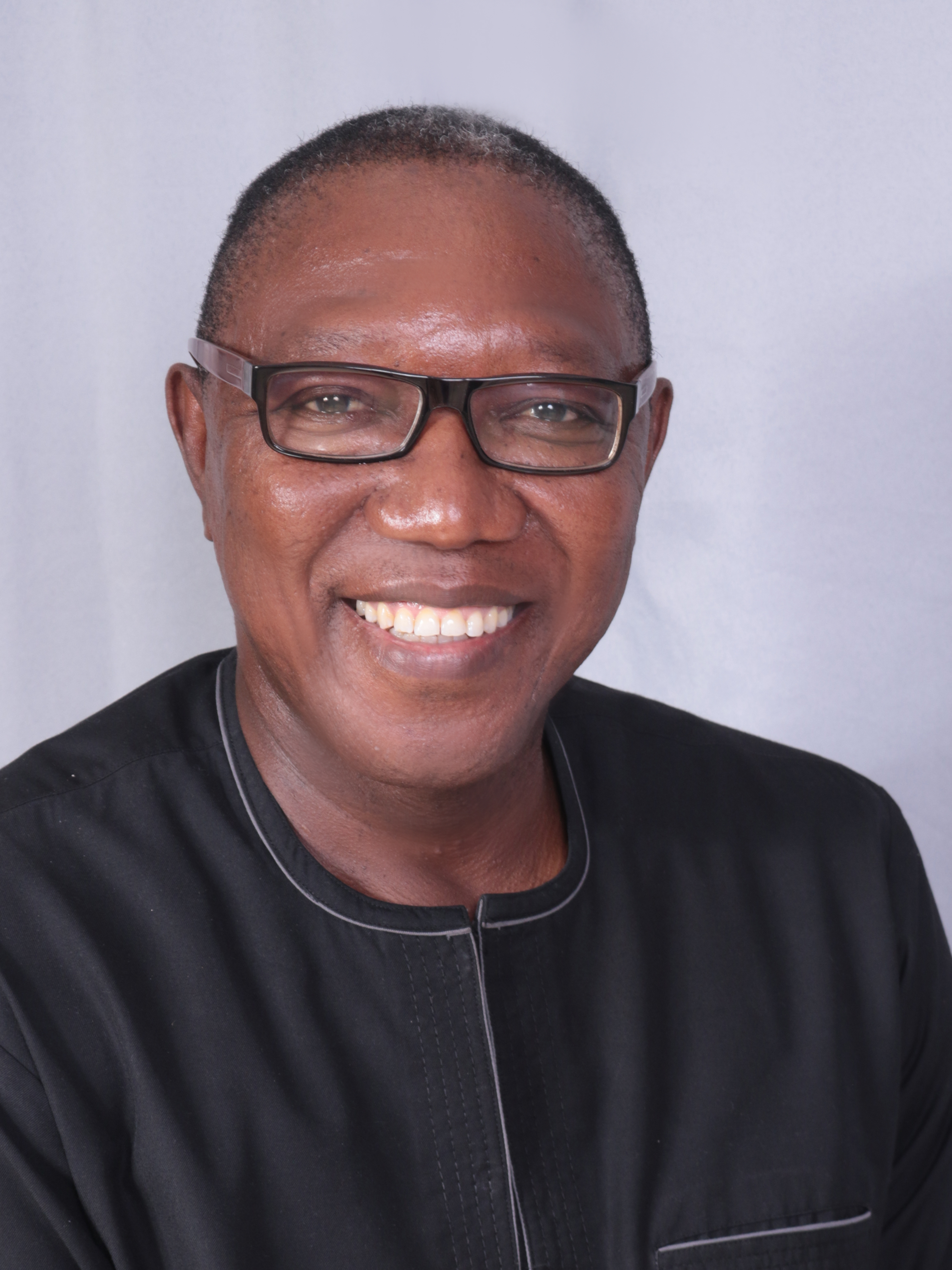

Member of the Ghana Parliament for Builsa South Constituency

Personal details
- Born: 11 June 1970 (age 56) Dorninga
- Party: National Democratic Congress
- Occupation: Ghanaian Politician, Lecturer

Clement Abas Apaak is a Ghanaian politician and member of the Seventh Parliament of the Fourth Republic of Ghana representing the Builsa South Constituency in the Upper East Region on the ticket of the National Democratic Congress. He is currently a deputy ranking member on the Ghanaian Parliament's Education Committee. He also serves on the Public Accounts Committee.

== Early life ==
He hails from Dorninga in Ghana and obtained a Bachelor of Arts degree at the University of Ghana. Dr. Clement Abas Apaak holds a PhD in archaeology from Simon Fraser University (SFU), Canada; M.Phil. in Archaeology from the University of Bergen, Norway; International Certificate in African Archaeology from the Vrije Universiteit Brussel; and a Bachelor of Arts degree in Archaeology and History from the University of Ghana.

== Political life ==
Apaak is a member of the National Democratic Congress (NDC) and represents the Builsa South Constituency in the Upper East Region of Ghana. He is of the view that the passing of the Public University Bill has no relevance. He is a christian.
