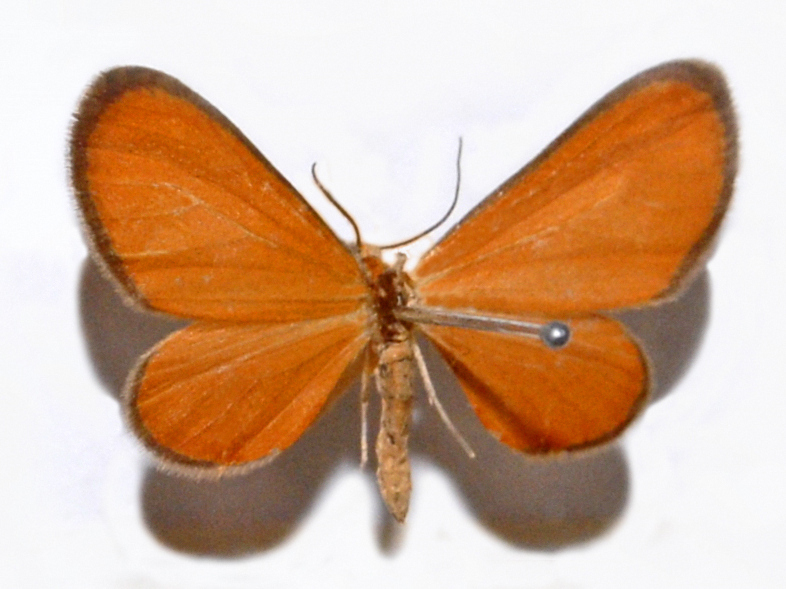
- Eudulophasia invaria

Scientific classification
- Kingdom: Animalia
- Phylum: Arthropoda
- Clade: Pancrustacea
- Class: Insecta
- Order: Lepidoptera
- Family: Geometridae
- Tribe: Eudulini
- Genus: Eudulophasia; Warren, 1897

= Eudulophasia =

Genus of moths

Eudulophasia is a genus of moths in the family Geometridae erected by William Warren in 1897. These moths are primarily distributed throughout Central and South America. Depending on the exact species, they can be found in Mexico, Honduras, Guatemala, Costa Rica, Panama, Colombia, and Venezuela.

== Species ==
- Eudulophasia invaria (Walker, 1854)
- Eudulophasia nigricosta (H. Edwards, 1884)
- Eudulophasia unicolor (Möschler, 1878)
