= Abolimbisa Akantagriwen =

Ghanaian politician (born 1964)

Hon. Abolimbisa Roger Akantagriwen

Member of Parliament for Builsa South Constituency
- In office 7 January 2005 – 6 January 2009
- President: John Kufuor

Personal details
- Born: 6 March 1964 (age 62)
- Party: National Democratic Congress

Abolimbisa Roger Akantagriwen (born 6 March 1964) is a Ghanaian Politician and a member of the Fourth Parliament of the Fourth Republic of Ghana representing the Builsa South Constituency in the Upper East Region.

== Early life and education ==
Akantagriwen was born in Builsa in the Upper East Region of Ghana on 6 March 1964. He attended the University of Education and obtained a Degree in Bachelor of Art (Education).

== Career ==
Akantagriwen is a teacher and a former member of Parliament for the Builsa South constituency of the Upper East Region of Ghana from 2005 to 2009.

== Politics ==
Akantagriwen was first elected into Parliament during the December 2004 Ghanaian General Elections on the Ticket of the New Patriotic Party representing the Builsa South Constituency in the Upper East Region of Ghana. He obtained 4,820 votes out of the 10,947 valid votes cast representing 44.00%. He was defeated in the 2008 General elections by Alhassan Azong.

== Elections ==
Akantagriwen was elected as the member of parliament for the Builsa South constituency of the Upper East Region of Ghana in the 2004 Ghanaian general elections. He won on the ticket of the National Democratic Congress. His constituency was a part of the 9 parliamentary seats out of 13 seats won by the National Democratic Congress in that election for the Upper East Region. The National Democratic Congress won a minority total of 94 parliamentary seats out of 230 seats. He was elected with 4,820 votes out of 10,974 total valid votes cast. This was equivalent to 44% of total valid votes cast. He was elected over Achianah Joseph Amoabil of the Peoples’ National Convention, Theodore Kaboa Ayaric of the New Patriotic Party and Kunde Daniel Collins of the Convention People's Party. These obtained 2,631, 3,413 and 83 votes respectively of total votes cast. These were equivalent to 24%, 31.2% and 0.8% respectively of total valid votes cast.

== Personal life ==
Akantagriwen is a Christian.
