= Ameria =

Ameria may refer to:

- Amelia, Umbria, Italy, a comune
- Site of a temple near Cabira, Pontus, in present-day Turkey
- Ameriabank, an Armenian bank
- Ameria invaria, a moth species
- Mahathala ameria, a butterfly species

== See also ==
- America (disambiguation)
