= Notre Dame Seminary Senior High School, Navrongo =

School in Navrongo, Ghana

Notre Dame Seminary Senior High School is an all male second cycle educational institution founded by Very Rev. Fr. Armand Lebel. The first batch of thirty-one (31) students were admitted on September 16, 1960. It is a day and boarding school. Currently, the school has a population of about 500 students studying either General Science or General Arts. The school is located in Navrongo in the Kasena-Nankana Municipality of the Upper East Region of Ghana.

In line with the motto of the School, "Scientia et Fide" (Knowledge and Faith or Knowledge in the service of Faith) and the intention of the founding fathers, Notre Dame Seminary SHS seeks to provide an education at the pre-tertiary level by training its students to become "effective channels of God".

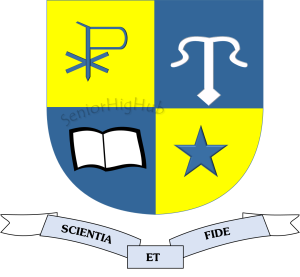
school crest

== History ==
The School was established by the Catholic Church through by Rev. Father Lebel on 8 July 1960. The School had an initial enrollment of 31 students and was mainly managed by the Catholic Church until 1990 where the Government of Ghana through the Ghana Education Service (GES) took over in 1996. The current Rector of the School is Rev. Father Vitus Alnaa, a catholic priest. The students' performance in the West African School Certificate Examinations (WASSCE) has been recorded.

== School Courses ==
- General Science
- General Arts

== School Category ==
Category A

== School Facilities ==
- Dinning Hall
- Library
- Assembly Hall
- Science Lab
- Dormitory Block
- STA Bungalows.

== Notable alumni ==
- Alfred Agyenta
- Stephen Ayidiya
- Dominic Akuritinga Ayine
- Gordon Awandare
- Sylvester Azantilow
- Emmanuel Bombande
- Mark Woyongo
- William Atuguba
