= Chiana-Paga (Ghana parliament constituency) =

Constituency in Ghana

- constituency for the Parliament of Ghana
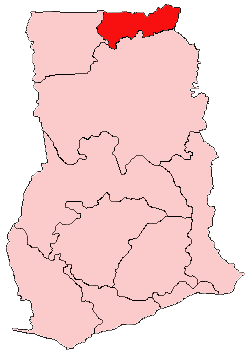
- District: Kassena/Nankana District
- Region: Upper East Region of Ghana

Current constituency
- Party: National Democratic Congress
- MP: Nikyema Billa Alamzy

Chiana-Paga is one of the constituencies represented in the Parliament of Ghana. It elects one Member of Parliament (MP) by the first past the post system of election. Nikyema Billa Alamzy is the member of parliament for the constituency. Chiana-Paga is in the Kassena/Nankana district of the Upper East Region of Ghana.

== Boundaries ==
The seat is located within the Kassena/Nankana District in the Upper East Region of Ghana.

== Members of Parliament ==
First elected	Member	Party
First Republic - Paga
1965	Clement Kubindiwo Tedam	Convention People's Party
Second Republic - Chiana Paga
1969	Catherine Katuni Tedam	Progress Party
Third Republic
1979	Kubaje Andrea Amidila	People's National Party
Fourth Republic
1992	Stephen Ayidaya	National Democratic Congress
1996	Pele Tumbakura Abugu	National Democratic Congress
2008	Allowe Leo Kabah	New Patriotic Party
2012	Pele Tumbakura Abugu	National Democratic Congress
2016	Rudolph Nsowine Amenga-Etego	National Democratic Congress
2020	Thomas Adda Dalu	National Democratic Congress

== Elections ==
2008 Ghanaian parliamentary election: Chiana-Paga Source:Ghana Home Page
Party	Candidate	Votes	%	±%
New Patriotic Party	Alowe Leo Kabah	8,323	29.9	
National Democratic Congress	Pele Abuga	7,380	26.5	
Convention People's Party	Ayirevire Desmong	6,567	23.6	
People's National Convention	Niagia Francis Santuah	5,464	19.6	
Independent	Rudolf N. Amenga-Etego	105	0.4	
Majority		1,043	3.4	—
Turnout				—

== See also ==
- List of Ghana Parliament constituencies
