= Builsa North (Ghana parliament constituency) =

Constituency in Ghana

- constituency for the Parliament of Ghana
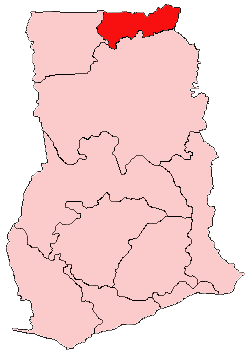
- District: Builsa District
- Region: Upper East Region of Ghana

Current constituency
- Party: National Democratic Congress
- MP: Hon. James Agalga

Builsa North is one of the constituencies represented in the Parliament of Ghana. It elects one Member of Parliament (MP) by the first past the post system of election. Builsa North is located in the Builsa district of the Upper East Region of Ghana.

== Boundaries ==
The seat is located within the Builsa District in the Upper East Region of Ghana.

== 1.1 Background ==
The Builsa North District is one of the thirteen administrative districts in the Upper East Region of Ghana. The Builsa North District was carved out of the Builsa District on 15 March 2012 by an Act of Parliament, 1993 (Act 462) with Sandema as its administrative capital. The paramount aim of creating this Assembly is to bring the business of governance to the doorsteps of the ordinary Ghanaian. The Builsa North District has a total population of 56,477 with 98 communities.

== 1.2 Physical Features ==
=== 1.2.1 Location and size ===
The district lies between longitudes 10 05‟West and 10 35‟ West and latitudes 100 20‟ North. The Builsa North District shares boundaries with Kassena–Nankana West District to the North, to the West with Sissala East District, to the East with Kassena–Nankana East Municipal and to the south with Builsa South District. The district covers an estimated land area of 816.44030 km2 .

=== 1.2.2 Relief and drainage ===
The topography of the area is undulating and slopes ranging from 200 metres to 300 metres within the western and northern part of the district particularly around Bachonsa and Chuchuliga zones. In the valleys of Sissili, Kulpawn, Besibeli, Tono, Asibelika and the Azimzim, the slopes are gentler and range from 150 metres to 200 metres.

=== 1.2.3 Climate ===
The district has mean monthly temperatures ranging between 21.90 C and 34.10 C. The highest temperatures are recorded in March and this can rise to 450 C, whereas the lowest temperatures are recorded in January. The dry season is characterized by dry Harmattan winds. There is only one rainy season, which builds up gradually from little rains in April to a maximum in August-September, and then declines sharply coming to a complete halt in midOctober when the dry season sets in.

=== 1.2.4 Vegetation ===
The district is characterized by Savannah woodland and consists mostly of deciduous, widely spaced fire and drought resistant trees of varying sizes and density with dispersed perennial grasses and associated herbs. Through the activities of man, the woodland savannah has been reduced to open parkland where only trees of economic value like baobab, acacia, sheanut and the dawadawa have been retained with time.

=== 1.2.5 Soil ===
The soils of Builsa North District are developed from different geological formations namely Granite, Birimian rocks, Voltaian shale, recent and old Alluvium of mixed origin and very old river terraces. Out of these, the dominant soil groups in the district are of granite origin and cover over 70 percent (approximately 153,300ha) of the district‟s land area.

== 1.3 Political Administration ==
The Builsa North District Assembly has a total membership of forty-five (45) assembly members which is made up of thirty-one (31) elected members, fourteen appointed members and ex-officio members comprising the Member of Parliament and the District Chief Executive. The present Assembly has six female members, four of whom are elected and the other two are appointed. There are two Town Councils and three Area Councils with 31 Electoral Areas in the Builsa North District. These are the Sandema Town Council, Wiaga Town Council, Siniensi Area Council, Kadema Area Council and Chuchuliga Area Council. Administratively, the District Assembly has the following departments in place which are functioning under the District Co-ordinating Director; Health Service Directorate, Ghana Education Service (GES), Department of Community Development, Birth and Deaths Registry, District Environmental Health Unit, Department of Agriculture. The following national agencies which do not form part of the departments of the Assembly are also in place; the National Service Secretariat, the National Commission for Civic Education (NCCE), the Immigration Service, the CEPS, and the Police Service.

=== 1.3.1 Committees of the assembly ===
The following committees have been constituted and are operational as part of the political and administrative machinery of the district. The executive committee (which is supported by the following sub-committees): Finance and Administration, Works, Justice and Security, Development Planning, Health and Environment, Education, Agriculture, Women and Children. The other committees in the district are: District HIV/AIDS Committee, District Security Council, District Tender Committee, District Tender Review Board, Audit Report Implementation Committee, and District Budget Committee.

== 1.4 Social and Cultural Structure ==
=== 1.4.1 Traditional set-up ===
There is one paramouncy in the Builsa North District referred to as the Sandema Traditional Area. The Traditional Authority area has twelve divisional chiefs referred to as the „Kanbunabas‟ who are under the Sandema Nab. These sub-chiefs handle matters concerning chieftaincy, culture, traditions and issues relating to the various traditional councils and the individual sub-chiefs of which the Sandema Nab supersedes. The Chieftaincy institutions in collaboration with other stakeholders work to promote peace in the area.

=== 1.4.2 Ethnicity ===
The predominant ethnic group in the district is Builsa. The Builsas constitute about 83 percent of the entire population. The remaining 17 percent is made up of minor ethnic groups comprising the Kantosi, Mamprusi, Sissala, Nankani, Mossi and some few migrant workers from Burkina-Faso. These tribes have co-existed over the years thus contributing to the development of the district.

=== 1.4.3 Religious composition ===
The major religious denominations are Christians, Muslims, and Traditionalist. The largest mode of worship is the Traditional African Religion, which makes up 46 percent of the population followed by the Christian Religion (28%) and Moslems (23%). Other religions constitute about 3.0 percent of the total population. The traditionalists are mostly found in the rural parts of the district. Their spiritual roles contribute to enhancing peace and development in the district.

=== 1.4.4 Festivals ===
Festivals are significant practices in the Builsa North District. The Feok festival is an annual festival celebrated to commemorate the defeat of Babatu and his notorious slave raiders by the ancestors of Builsa in the nineteenth century. The festival usually comes in the third week of December and has virtually become a prelude to Christmas in the district. In view of its historic importance a number of tourists often participate in the celebration of the festival.

=== 1.4.5 Marriage ===
The traditional marriage system entails a distinctive practice or payment of bride price, a system where the family of the bridegroom carries out some marital obligations including the provision of cola nuts, a bottle of schnapps and some amount of money. The above arrangement serves to strengthen ties between families.

=== 1.4.6 Inheritance ===
The patrilineal system of inheritance is practised. The eldest son inherits the deceased father in trust of the family. The system does not allow daughters access to heritable property within the traditional system which invariably denies women access to productive resources including land.

=== 1.4.7 Funerals ===
A funeral rite is one of the most vital ceremonies among the people of Builsa traditional area. It is very significant as it indicates the final passage of the deceased to the ancestors or „the other world.‟ The funeral rite is divided into two sessions. The first referred to as "Kumka‟ is performed within the shortest possible time from the time of death of the person. Burial takes place within a week and some rituals are performed for the deceased. The final funeral rite referred to as "Juka‟ is performed after several successive meetings are held and a consensus is reached between the family heads.

=== 1.4.8 Land title and ownership ===
Land in the Builsa North District is not owned by individuals but rather the family heads who takes care of the land on behalf of the family. The chief however oversees the distribution and sale of land. The Tindanas (original natives or first settlers) are the original owners of the land.

== 1.5 Economy ==
Builsa North District is predominantly rural with agriculture as the main economic activity undertaken by self-employed farmers. The Builsa District North possesses some of the best spots for tourist attraction. They include the Sissili Central forest reserves with an area of 155.09sq km, Abuga Crocodile pond in Uwasi, the Fiisa Shrine and the Doninga Slave Market.

== Members of Parliament ==
| Election | Member | Party |
|---|---|---|
| 1992 | Sylvester Azantilow | National Democratic Congress |
| 1996 | Theodore Basil Anuka | National Democratic Congress |
| 2004 | Agnes Asangalisa Chigabatia | New Patriotic Party |
| 2008 | Timothy Awotiirim Ataboadey | National Democratic Congress |
| 2012 | James Agalga | National Democratic Congress |

== Elections ==
2008 Ghanaian parliamentary election: Builsa North Source:Ghana Home Page
| Party | Candidate | Votes | % | ±% |
|---|---|---|---|---|
| National Democratic Congress | Timothy Awotiirim Ataboadey | 8,259 | 43.1 | |
| New Patriotic Party | Agnes Asangalisa Chigabatia | 6,988 | 36.5 | |
| People's National Convention | Thomas Akum-Yong | 3,361 | 17.5 | |
| Convention People's Party | Dominic Davinus Atibil | 557 | 2.9 | |
| Majority | | 1,271 | 6.6 | |
| Turnout | | | | — |

== See also ==
- List of Ghana Parliament constituencies
