= Builsa South (district) =

Builsa South District
- District
- Districts of Upper East Region

- Location of Builsa District within Upper East
- Coordinates: 10°27′3.96″N 1°18′21.6″W
- Country: Ghana
- Region: Upper East
- Capital: Fumbisi

Population (2021)
  - Total: 36,575
- Time zone: UTC+0 (GMT)
- ISO 3166 code: GH-UE-BS

Builsa South District is one of the fifteen districts in Upper East Region, Ghana. Originally it was formerly part of the then-larger Builsa District in 1988, until the southern part of the district was split off to create Builsa South District on 28 June 2012; thus the remaining part has been renamed as Builsa North District, which it was later elevated to municipal district assembly status on 19 December 2018 to become Builsa North Municipal District. The district assembly is located in the western part of Upper East Region and has Fumbisi as its capital town.
