= Zabarma Emirate =

Islamic state in modern-day Ghana and Burkina Faso

- 1860–1897
- Religion: Islam
- List of Rulers
  - 1860: Babatu
- History
  - Established: 1860
  - Disestablished: 1897
- Today part of: Ghana; Burkina Faso

The Zabarma Emirate was an Islamic state that existed from the 1860s to 1897 in what is today parts of Ghana and Burkina Faso.

The leaders of the Zabarma Emirate, who belonged to the Zarma ethnicity from which the Emirate is named, originated in an area now in the nation of Niger, in an area south-east of Niamey on the east side of the Niger River.

The key moving force behind the state was Babatu who hailed from N'Dounga in Niger, a place that had been Muslim far longer than most of the other areas the Zabarma leadership came from, most of which became Muslim only in the 1850s or so.

== History ==
The founders of the Zabarma Emirate were Muslim Zarma, a subgroup of the Songhai who speak the Zarma dialect.

After the Songhai campaign of 1516, some of them had settled in the newly conquered kingdom of Kebbi. After the defeat of the Songhai Empire in 1591, there was again a major wave of migration by the Zarma to these regions.

Although the Zarma have been consistently subject to Islamic influences since then, they have been able to withstand extensive Islamization for centuries. So it is not surprising that the Zarma Land was one of the primary goals in the great jihad of Usman dan Fodio (1790–1809) and was partially conquered by the Fulani jihadists. With the establishment of the Sokoto Caliphate in 1809, parts of the Zarma Land became known as the Emirate of Kebbi; Western Province of the New Sokoto Empire. In 1860, there was an uprising against the occupying power in and around Kebbi with the help of other ethnic groups. The Zarma rebelled and succeeded in regaining political power and largely driving the Fulanis out of the country.

The genesis of their conversion to Islam was triggered by this uprising and the already existing general longing for a more just social order. Large parts of the population of Zarma Land turned to Islam during these years, which increasingly established itself as the main religion in these areas.

Due to the general devastation as a result of the "warlike" events and the resulting failures in vital areas of economic production, numerous Zarma increasingly concentrated on trade outside their national borders.

=== Kingdom of Dagbon ===
During this time, groups of Zarma warriors, among others, also made their way into the Kingdom of Dagbon, initially appearing as horse traders. The Dagbamba chiefs took their time paying for their horses, which led the Zarma to settle in Dagbon until they were paid for. During this time, Alfa Hanno and Alfa Gazari arrived in Dagbon after dedicating themselves to religious studies in the Gonja metropolis of Salaga. The Zarma in Dagbon chose Hanno as their leader, and he later became the leader of all Zarma who lived outside their homeland in Niger.

Dagbon was also engulfed in a civil war between Yakuba, the reigning Ya Naa, and his sons, and "punitive expeditions" were organized against neighboring peoples under the pretext that they had supported the other side. The Zarma participated as mercenaries in these expeditions, primarily in the campaigns of Adama, the then Na Karaga, and Abudullai, the then Na Kumbungu in Gurunsi land.

Despite their small numbers, the Zarma mercenaries were highly valued allies in the Dagbon army because they were relatively well-armed and experienced riders who knew how to fight with a high degree of internal unity and mobility. However, they remained only in a guest role within the Dagbon armed forces, based solely on unpaid debts of various Dagbon chiefs. In addition, the Zarma became increasingly unpopular in Dagbon due to their committed involvement in Dagbon's internal affairs. Property disputes also arose between Alfa Hanno and the Ya Naa.

The strained relationship between the Dagbamba and Zarma is evident in Isaka's demand that Alfa Gazari of the Zarma be appointed Uban Dawaki (cavalry of the Dagbon army) before the next expedition, which was generally rejected by the Dagbamba. Some time later, there was a definitive break between the Zarma and Dagbon, as the Ya Naa sent troops to the Zarma to first emphasize his own property demands. Subsequently, at the time of Alfa Gazari's inauguration as Hanno's successor, Andani, the chief of Savelugu, had been tasked by the Ya Naa to invade Gurunsi land and "bring back" the Zarmas, which violated a holy oath that the leaders of Dagbon and the Zarma had sworn on the Qur’an never to raise their hands against each other. This breach of trust finally sealed the end of the already strained Zarma-Dagbamba alliance.

== Campaigns and Conquests ==
=== Campaign to Wala and Dagarti Land ===
In 1890, Zarma troops invaded Wala. In the subsequent Battle of Nasa, 12,000 warriors of the Wala King Bazori faced off against 9,000 Zarma warriors of Emir Babatu dan Isa. Both sides also had religious support from prominent Islamic leaders, known as “Mallams”. Babatu and his troops eventually emerged victorious and occupied the city of Nasa. However, he found the city largely deserted, as much of the population had fled. Those who remained in the city hastily fled as Babatu's troops approached. The Zarma pursued the fleeing population and engaged in another battle near Wa, in which Babatu's troops again emerged victorious. From here, the Zarma invaded the Dagarti Land, triggering a general movement of people towards Wala. However, envoys of the Wala king who went to negotiate with Babatu were murdered by the Zarma. Babatu then had the city of Wa occupied and established his new headquarters there.

From Wa, Babatu soon began a campaign into Dagarti Land. However, he only reached Baire (Bayayiri), where the Zarma set up their camp. When attempting to capture the nearby city of Sankana, Babatu army's attack was successfully repelled. Despite the warning of his Mallams, Babatu was determined to continue the war. The Zarma army then moved to Sati and from there to the Kabala Land. The city of Kawulalawuri was occupied during this campaign, but was largely destroyed by the Zarma. However, the Zarma army continued on without staying for long. Unfortunately, nothing else is known about the further course of the campaign.

The political result of this Zarma campaign was that the Bona (Boya) residing in the West Gonja area signed a friendship and protection treaty with the British on April 12, 1894. Similarly, on May 4, 1894, the Dagarti signed a similar treaty with the British near Wa, and the Mamprussi signed one in Gambaga on May 28, 1894.

=== Campaign to the North into Mossi-Land ===
In order to avoid an open confrontation with the British, Babatu turned northward and invaded the Mossi Empire of Ouagadougou with his army, even though the Mossi and Zarma had otherwise remained distant from each other. However, this action had a background: Wobogo, the Moro Naba of Ouagadougou, had previously brought Zarma warriors into the country as mercenaries to "punish" a "disobedient vassal," the Lalle Naba, with their support. Despite this, due to the onset of the rainy season, the approaching Zarma army was forced to retreat without reaching the capital of the Lalle Naba. Various contemporary witnesses unanimously explain that the Zarma left a deep trail of destruction in their path. This Zarma raid also drove the remaining tribes of the Mossi Empire into the hands of the Europeans. As a result, the Mogho Naba (Mossi Emperor) signed a friendship and protection treaty with the British on July 2, 1894, in Ouagadougou.

=== Babatu, Samori, and the Europeans ===
As part of the Heligoland-Zanzibar Treaty negotiations, the governments in London and Berlin discussed a possible border between the British and German spheres of influence. As a result, the Dagbamba and large parts of Mamprusi land were divided into British and German spheres of influence, dissolving the Neutral Zone. The north of Mamprusi land was allocated to French territory. The British's strategic goal was to prevent further German and French expansion into the hinterland of the Ashanti Empire. However, they first needed to quickly eliminate the state structures of warlords like Babatu and Samori Touré.

While the French and British were arguing over the Kingdom of Gyaman (west of Ashanti), the Dagbamba began a rebellion that was directed mainly against the Europeans' efforts to gain political dominance in the Dagbon kingdom. Prior to this, the French had already reached the northern borders of Dagbon and assigned the territory they occupied to the Upper Senegal and Niger, which was part of French West Africa, established on June 16, 1895. However, there was no final agreement at that time on the delineation of borders between these areas and the other European colonial powers' spheres of interest.

Until then, both Samori and Babatu had avoided any confrontation with the French and had sought to cultivate relationships with the British. This approach initially worked out well for both of them since, as long as they did not pose a threat to the British government based in Cape Coast, they were left alone. However, this changed with Babatu's campaigns into Mamprusi, Dagarti, and Mossi, and the local authorities' requests for European assistance. But it was Samori's crossing of the Black Volta with his eastern army, under the command of his son Sarankye-Moré, that alarmed the British the most. In December 1895, Sarankye-Moré's soldiers entered the western Gonja region and left behind widespread destruction and depopulation, as was their custom. The British now felt compelled to act if they did not want to give up their positions north of the Ashanti Empire and leave the areas to the French and Germans. They therefore demanded the withdrawal of Samori's forces, albeit unsuccessfully. At the same time, preparations for a large military expedition aimed to the north were underway.

Prior to this, there had been an attempt at reconciliation between Samori and Babatu. Samori proposed an anti-European alliance to Babatu, which also included the Ashanti king and the Gyaman kingdom's leadership. Although the Asantehene signaled his willingness to participate, Braimah, the new Imam of Bondoukou north od present Ivory Coast, rejected the proposal despite a generous offer to his person. The Zarma Mallams also threatened to withdraw their support if Babatu accepted Samori's offer.

At that time, the Germans were expanding further north to the east of Dagbon and were actively seeking to win over the Dagbamba king. His kingdom was the most economically powerful central power in the entire region, considering the convergence of crucial caravan routes. This alarmed the British as it posed an immediate threat that the Ashanti Empire's hinterland would be divided by European competition without British involvement.

In 1896, the British established a garrison at Kintampo on the northwest border of the Ashanti heartland, while simultaneously a British military detachment led by Donald William Stewart marched northeast and occupied Gambaga in Mamprusi land, located northwest of the Dagbamba core area. The British were eager to win over the Dagbamba king to their side, hoping he would conclude a protection and trade treaty with the British Empire. However, the Dagbon anti-European uprising failed, and German troops defeated their army in the Battle of Adibo on December 4, 1896, occupying the capital, Yendi, the following day, and destroying much of it in the process.

Babatu and Samori now found themselves caught between the European colonial powers and sensed that their downfall was inevitable, especially after the British rejected a negotiation offer from Samori, and the French refused to negotiate with him, having militarily fought against him for years. Samori decided to create political facts of his own and sent negotiators to the Kong Empire in 1894 to purchase weapons. However, muslim Dyula merchants, through whom trade in Kong almost exclusively ran, refused the deal due to the ravages of Samorian Sofa gang, which had not spared other Islamic believers on their raids. Kong had already allied itself with the French or did so now, and this amounted to a declaration of war against Samori. As no French military could be seen in Kong, Samori had it occupied. His Sofa gang plundered and looted extensively, capturing and selling a large part of the population into slavery. The once flourishing trading city with its 20,000 inhabitants was reduced to smoking ruins after the massacre, and the Islamic Kingdom of Kong, which had existed since 1710, ceased to exist.

=== Fall ===
In early 1897, tensions between the British and French over Bondoukou and the areas surrounding the Black Volta prompted the British to establish the protectorate of the Northern Territories of the Gold Coast. This move was intended to prevent the French and Germans from occupying the lands north of Ashanti as they battled against the pirate kings. However, this also meant that Babatu's army was cut off from their route back south.

Together with their local allies, the French successfully defeated Babatu and his Zarma army on March 14, 1897, at Gandiogo. The rest of Babatu's troops were defeated again on June 23, 1897, at Doucie. The survivors of this battle then fled south, prompting the British to take military action against them in October 1897. The fighting lasted until June 1898, when the last resistance of Babatu's former private army was finally defeated.

As the British military presence continued to grow in Gambaga and other areas east of the Black Volta, many of the remaining authorities of the Zabarma Emirate in the Gurunsi area fled eastward towards Dagbon. However, eventually, they submitted to British sovereignty. On March 29, 1897, Samori's East Army clashed with the British expeditionary corps commanded by Francis B. Henderson. The battle ended with a crushing defeat of the Samorian army.

At this point, the area north of Ashanti and east of the Black Volta was free of slave raiders. However, it's worth noting that the Zabarma Emirate no longer existed as a united entity at that time.

== Ethnic Diversity in the Zabarma Emirate ==
From an ethnic point of view, the Zabarma Emirate was a very heterogeneous entity in which the Zarma who founded the state were actually only a minority. It was mainly Hausa, Fulani, Mossi, and members of the peoples of Gurunsi country who had joined the Zarma since their early campaigns. Despite being a minority, the Zarma had been able to secure the services of their followers of different origins, coupled with a rather long-lasting loyalty. The latter in particular was the basis on which the power of the Zarma was built.

Today, the descendants of the founders of the Zabarma Emirate, the Zarma people (Zabarma, Zamrama) live across the country of Ghana, apart from the later settled group. The current head of the Zarma in Ghana, however, still bears the title Sarkin Zabaramawa' and is a relative of the patrilineal lineage of the Babatu.

== Significant leaders of the Zabarma Emirate ==
Emirs:

- Hanno or Alfa Hano dan Tadano (referred to as Hanno in colonial literature): Zarma
- Gazari or Alfa Gazare dan Mahama (referred to as Gazari in colonial literature): Zarma; originally from Kara
- Babatu or Mahama dan Issa (referred to as Babatu in colonial literature): Zarma; originally from N'Dounga.

Other high-ranking state officials

Galadima:

(In the Zabarma State, Galadima was the title of the governor or deputy governor of an "important region" and the title is of Hausa origin.

- Isaka dan Aljima (also known as "Isaka Karaga"): Zarma; originally from Kirtachi, and was Galadima for the Dagarti, Pougouli, and Bobo regions along the Volta river. Initially, he refused to pledge allegiance to Babatu after the death of Gazari and led the resistance that delayed Babatu's installation as Emir of the Zabarma State for years. He often quarreled with Babatu, but later acknowledged Babatu's rule after a failed expedition. He lived in exile in Dagbon, which was accepted by Babatu. His grave is located in Yendi.
- Tunifikedubu (also mentioned as Kaga Zarumin): Zarma; described as wealthy, temperamental, and one of the bravest warriors in the Zabarma army. He was Galadima for the politically sensitive Walembele region and also lived in exile in Dagbon, which was accepted by Babatu. His grave is located in Yendi.

Mallams:

- Alabira: Zarma; probably the most prominent of the leadership advisory Mallams. He was also the spokesperson for all Mallams in the Emirate.
- Mumuni: Zarma
- Baba Limam: Zarma; likely the Friday Imam.

Other significant military leaders:

- Hamma Bruntaka: Zarma; initially, he was also an opponent of Babatu's seizure of power.
- Wonkoi: Zarma; an influential advisor despite having a subordinate position in

Tunifikedubu's army. His grave is located in Yendi.

- Takubaba: Zarma; he had already accompanied Alfa Gazari on the way to Dagbon.
- Hamma Zuma (also known as "Salaga"): he had important relationships with Salaga, which was then a thriving trading center in the Gonja Empire.
- Daramani Kago: originally from the Massina Empire; he likely had a connection to the Mallams of the Massina Fulani Empire, who had a colony in Yendi since the late 18th/early 19th century.
- Hamma Giwa: Zarma; killed during the disastrous Zabarma advance on the Black Volta.

== Sources ==
- Holden, J. J. "THE ZABARIMA CONQUEST OF NORTH-WEST GHANA PART I." Transactions of the Historical Society of Ghana 8 (1965): 60–86.
- Wilks, Ivor. "'He Was With Them': Malam Abu On The Zaberma Of The Middle Volta Basin." Sudanic Africa 4 (1993): 213–22.
