= Builsa =

Town in Upper East Region, Ghana

- Town
- Country: Ghana
- Region: Upper East Region
- District: Builsa District

Builsa is a town in the Builsa District of the Upper East Region of Ghana. The capital of Builsa North District is Sandema, of Builsa South District Fumbisi; other villages/towns are Wiaga, Fumbisi, Kanjaga, Gbedema, Siniensi, Kadema and Chuchuliga.

== Builsa Tribe ==
The Bulsa or Builsa people, who are sometimes wrongly called the Kanjaga, are agricultural and pastoral Oti-Volta speaking people who live in the Builsa Districts of the Upper East Region. Bulsa and indigenous Koma peoples live in the Savanna land along the Kulpawn and Sisil Rivers' confluence. Sandema is the area's main town and the paramountcy's seat.

Bulsa are believed to be the descendants of a Mampurusi prince named Atuga from Nalerigu, a Gur-speaking Kasena blacksmith (feok) named Akana from Kurugu near Dakai in Burkina Faso who built Kanjag Pung (tanggbain), and some indigenous Koma people [kom dem, people of Kom] whom both Atuga and Akana met on the land.

Bulsa are largely identical to the other peoples of the region, such as the Kasena and Nankana, with whom they share territories and with those intermarriages are prevalent. A Bulsa is a person from the Bulsa area, not a Kanjaga, as many Ghanaians and the colonialists wrongly identified them with.

== Language ==
The Builsa people speak Buli as their native language. In most oral circumstances, it is employed. It was rarely used for reading and writing until recently because there were few materials available and few people who possessed these skills. It shares linguistic similarities with Mampruli and Konni.

Konni appears to be the most similar, but little study has been done on him. Buli has some origins with Frafra, although his vocabulary is nothing like Frafra's. There are some grammatical parallels, but there are also some significant differences.

=== Basic Buli Greetings ===
Greeting Buli Response

Morning Selouk SeloukNallem

Afternoon Kantweng KantwengNallem

Evening Djunoi DjunoiNallem
