= Fiok festival =

Festival in Ghana by the Sandema people

The Fiok festival (also known as Feok Festival) is celebrated by the chiefs and people of Sandema in the Upper East Region of Ghana. The festival is celebrated in the month of December every year.

== Celebration ==
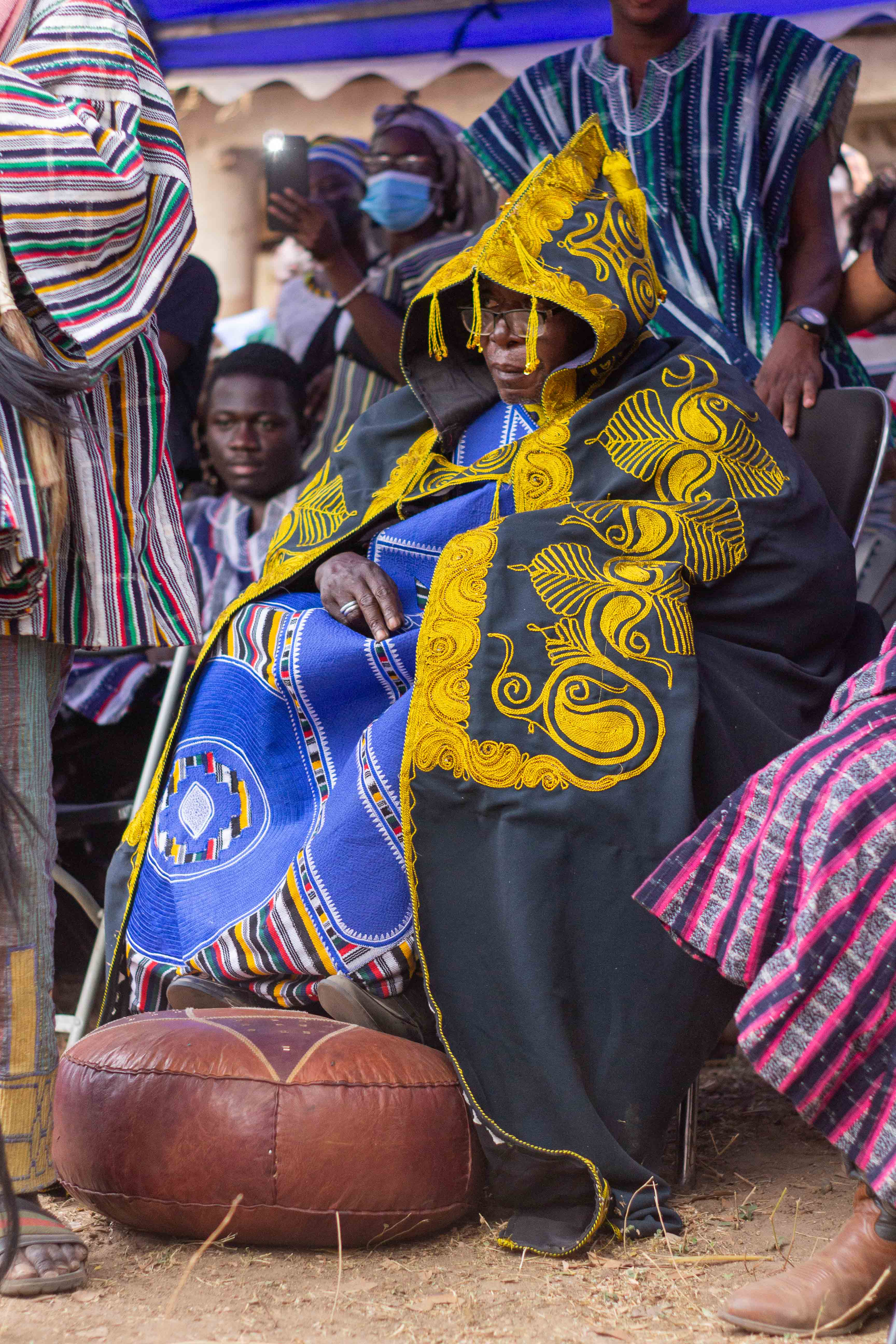
Fiok celebrarion

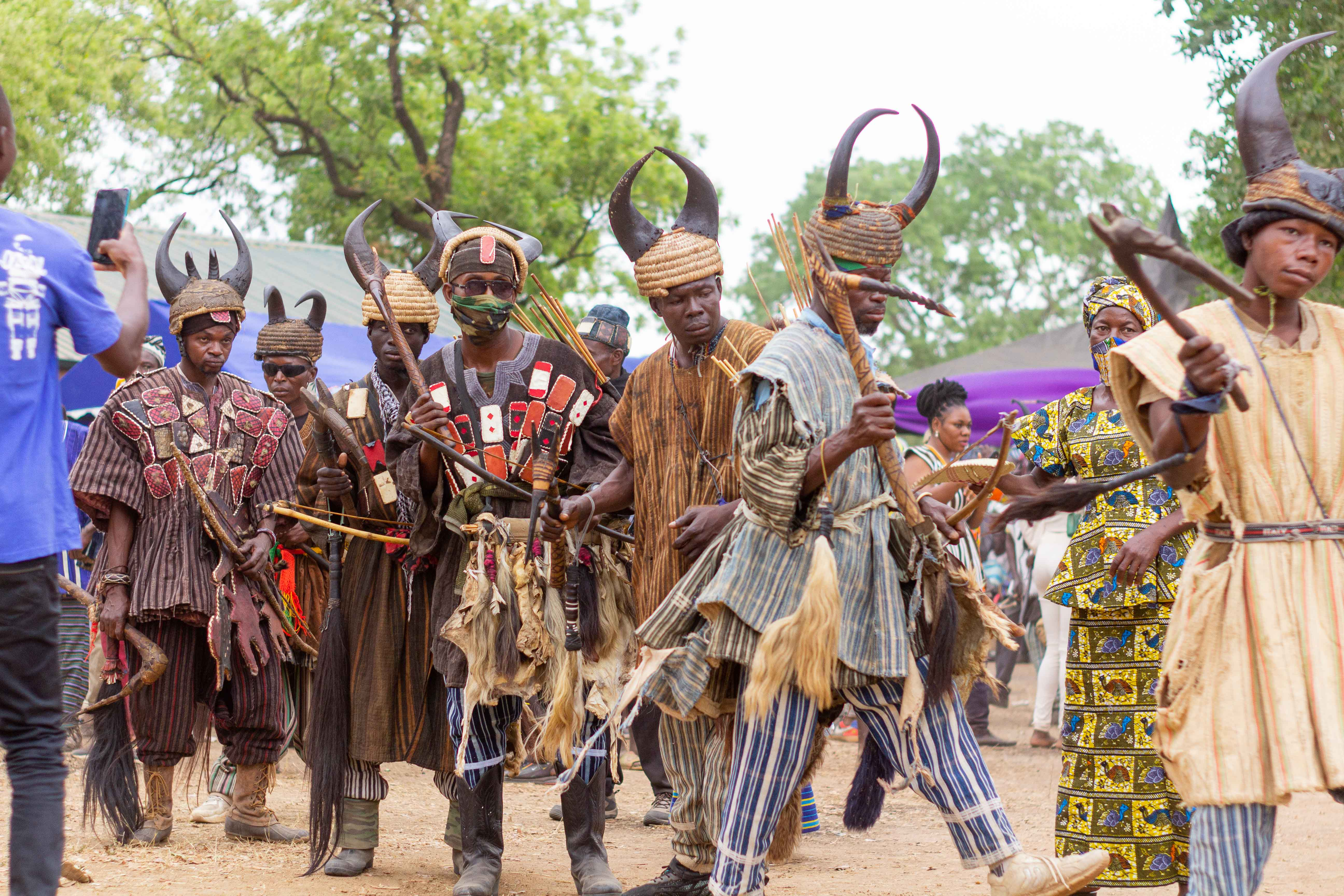
Fiok dancers

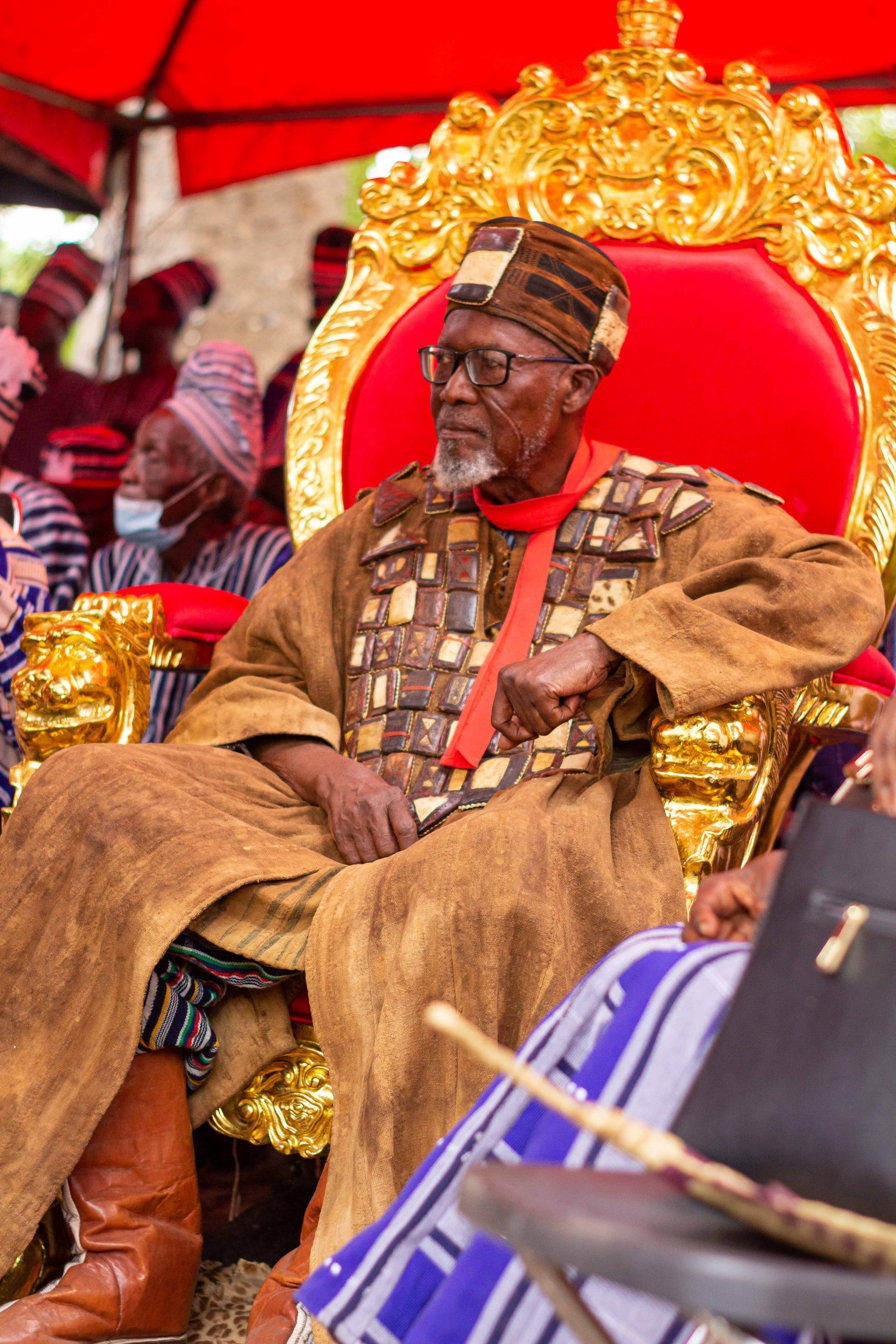
fiok festival

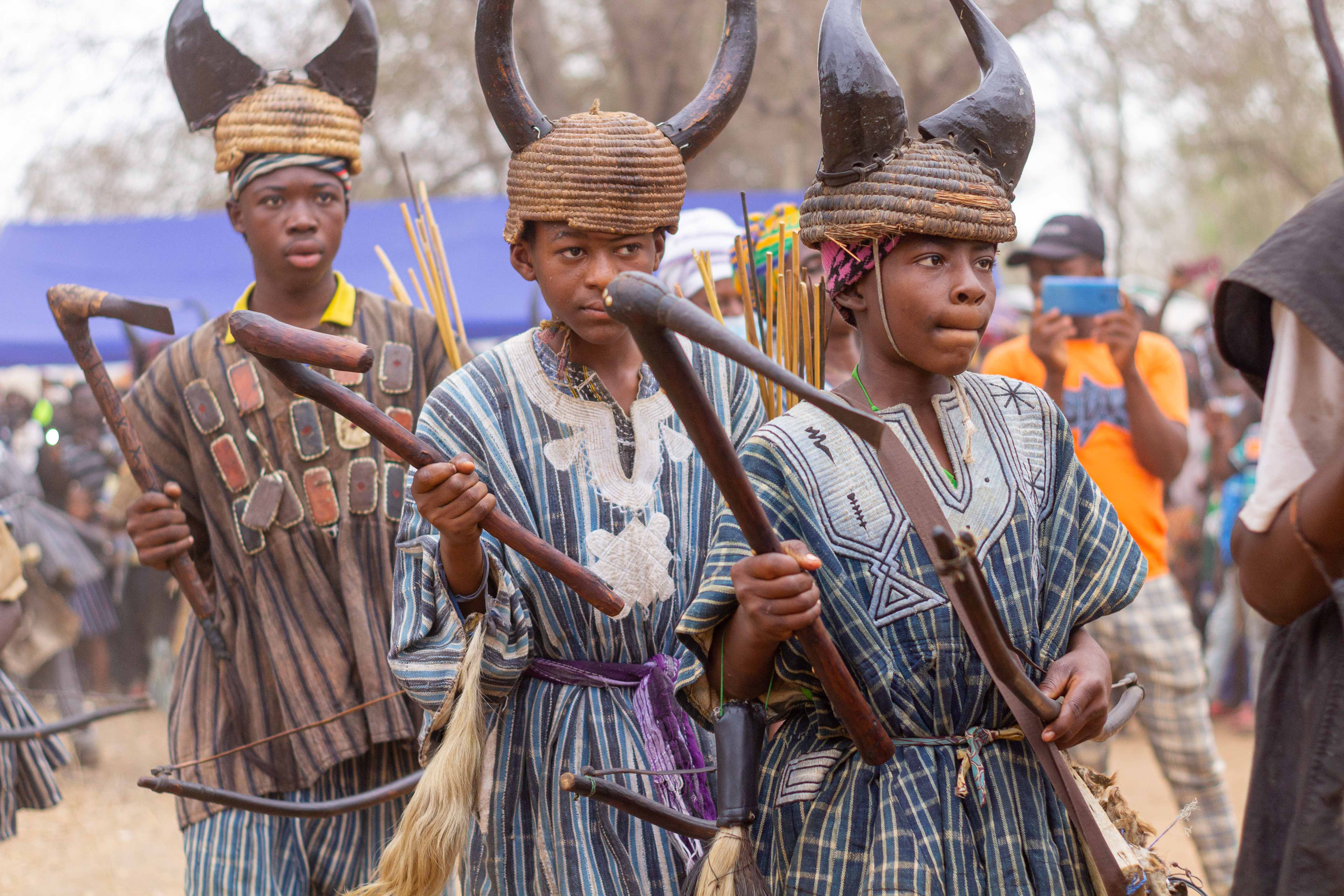
Fiok festival

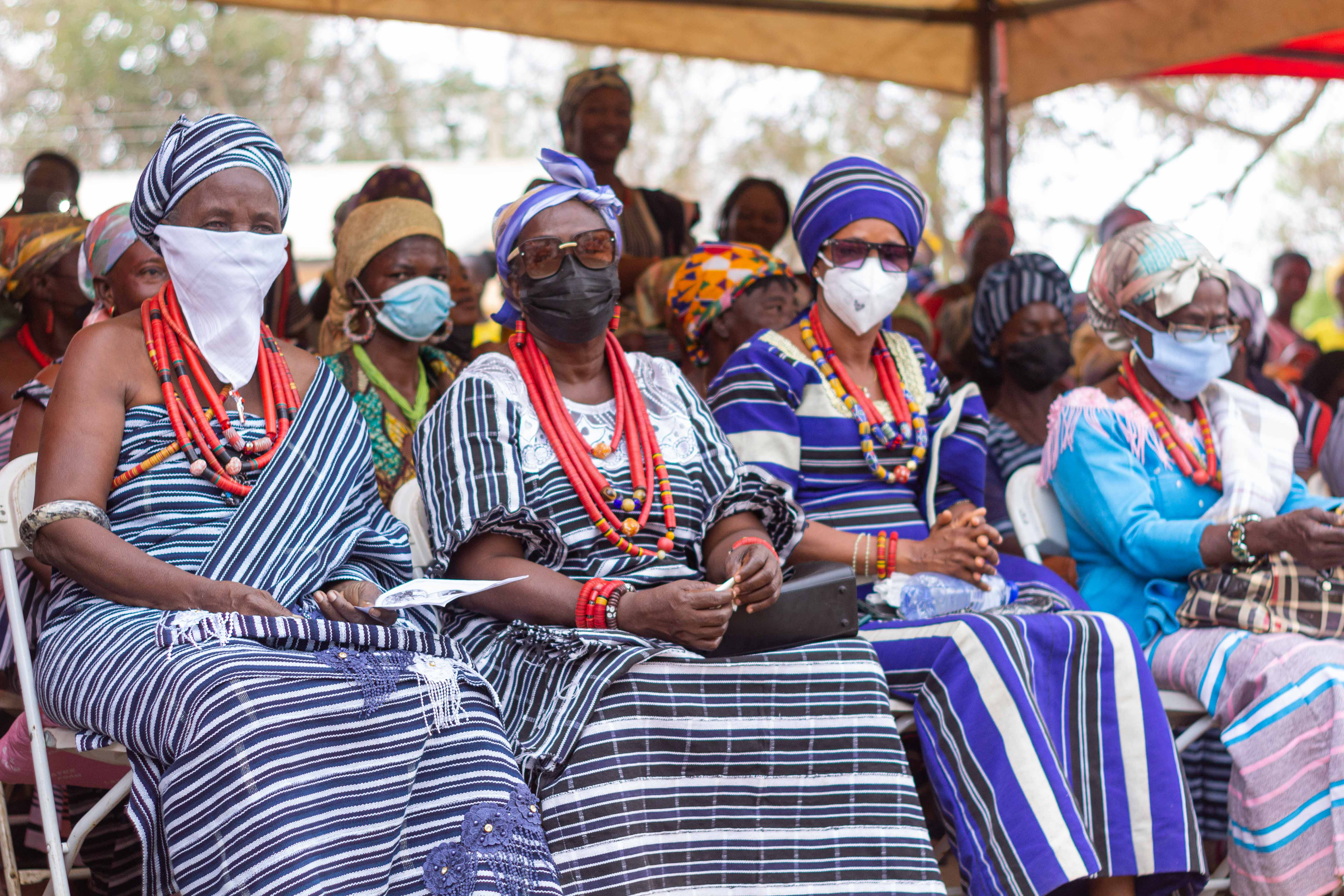
Fiok in sandema

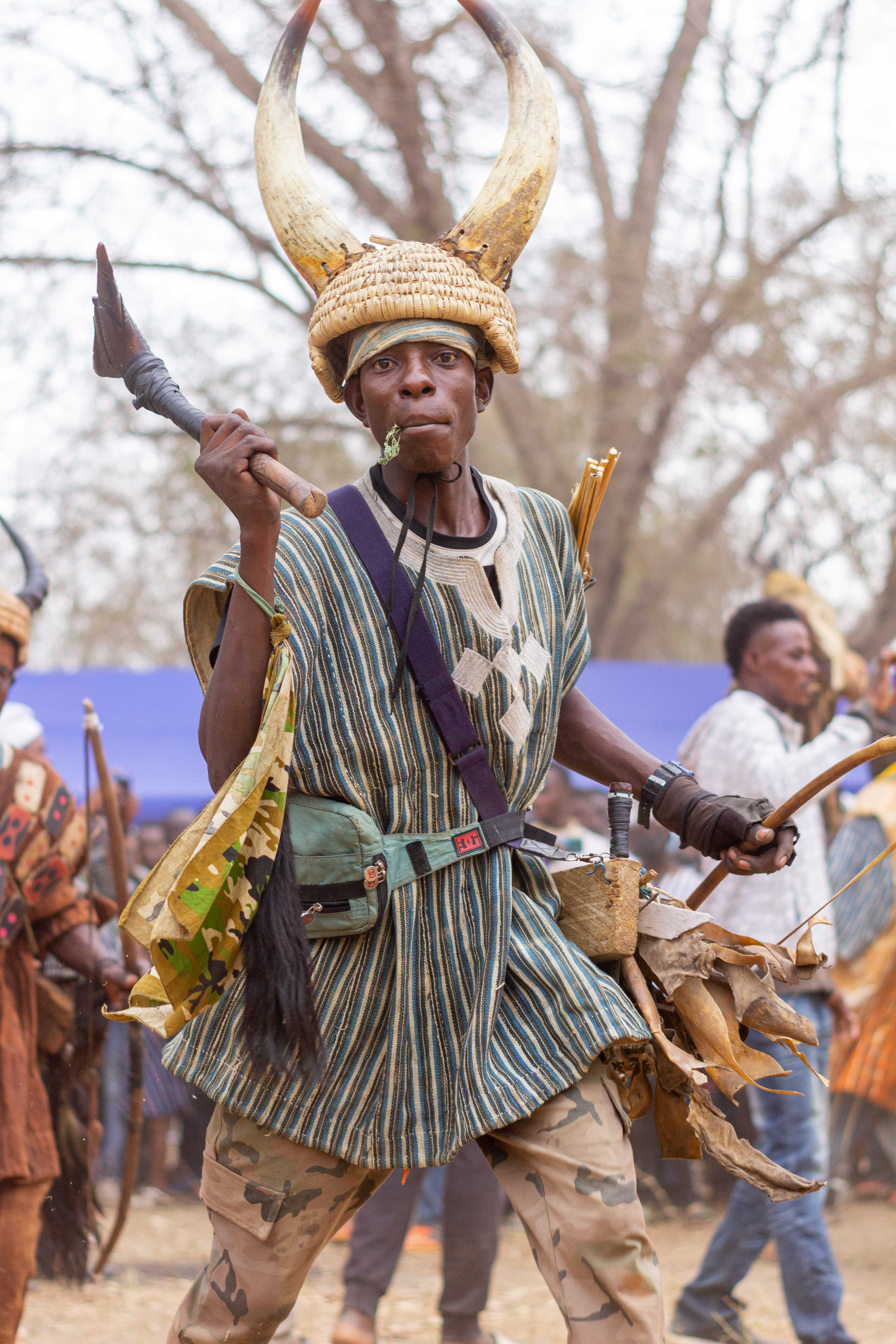
fiok warrior

War dancers from different villages in the region perform on stage. They are armed with bows and arrows, short axes, shields and spears to relive scenes from wars from the previous years. There are also scenes of resistance and how Babatu was defeated.

== Significance ==
The festival has become very significant in the area of Builsa in current times. It is claimed to have given a true sense of identity and solidarity to the builsa tribe.
