= Builsa District =

- Former District
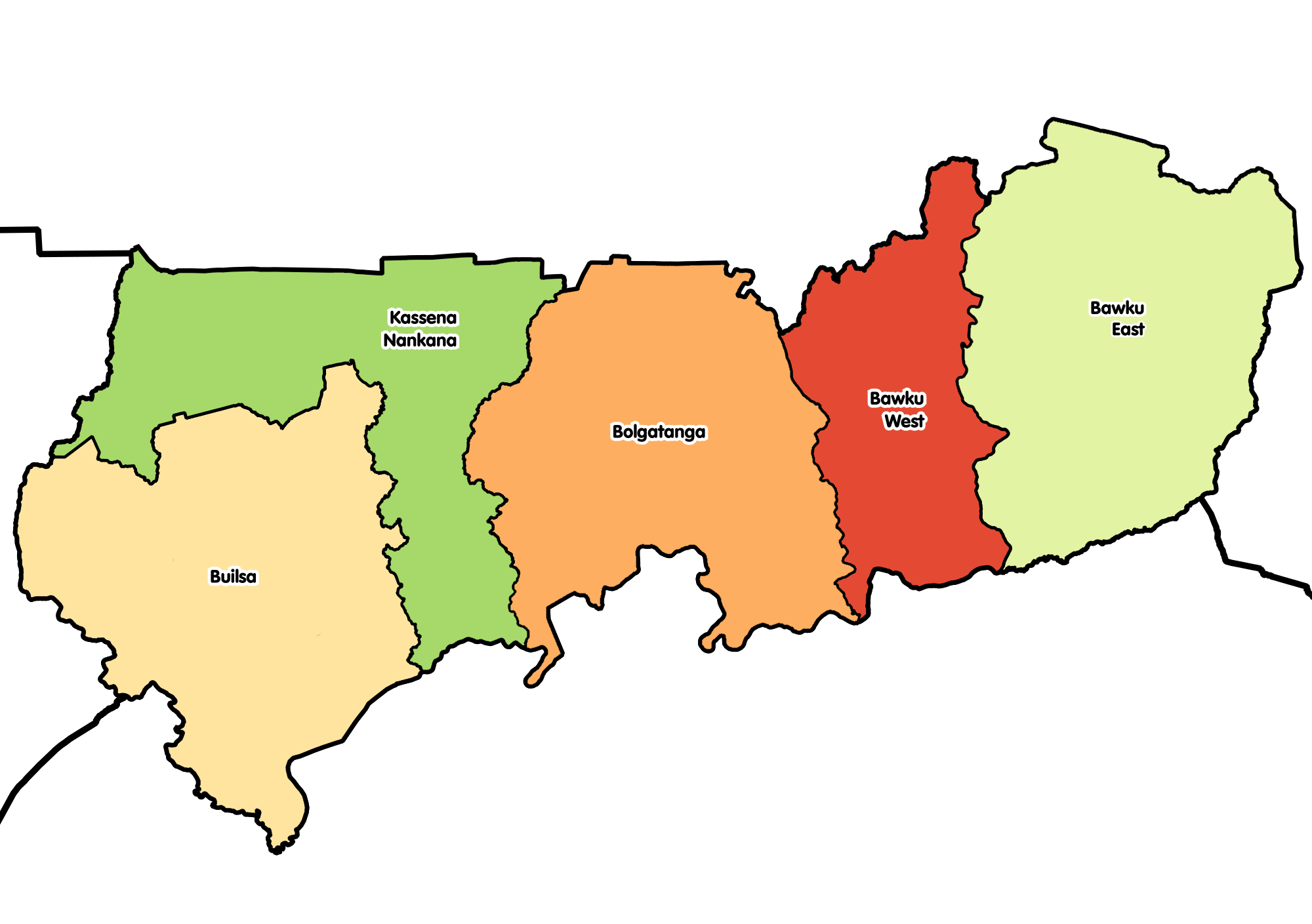
- Districts of Upper East Region

- Location of Builsa District within Upper East
- Coordinates: 10°44′5″N 1°17′26″W
- Country: Ghana
- Region: Upper East
- Capital: Sandema
- Time zone: UTC+0 (GMT)
- ISO 3166 code: GH-UE-BU

Builsa District is a former district that was located in Upper East Region, Ghana. Originally created as an ordinary district assembly in 1988, on 28 June 2012 it was split into two new districts: Builsa North District (which it was elevated to municipal district assembly status on 19 December 2018; capital: Sandema) and Builsa South District (capital: Fumbisi). The district assembly was located in the western part of Upper East Region and had Sandema as its capital town.

== Sources ==
- "Districts of Ghana". Statoids.
- GhanaDistricts.com
