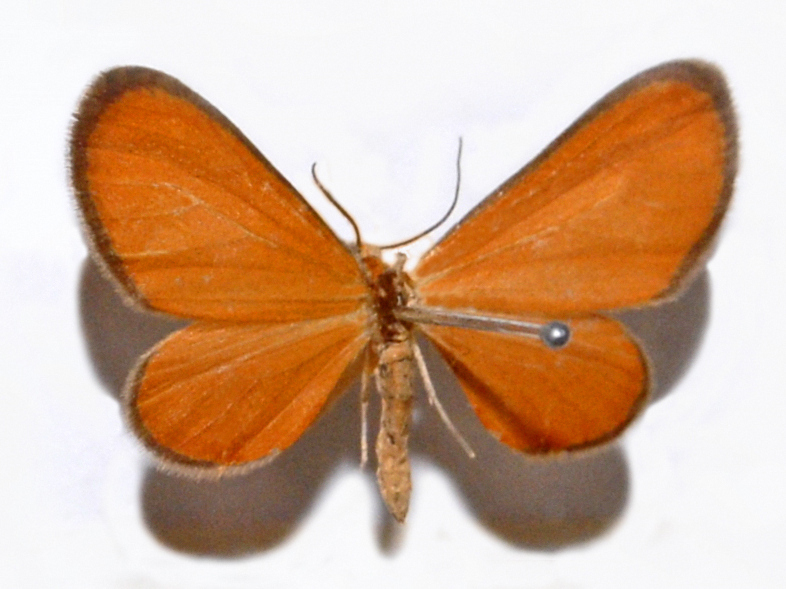

Scientific classification
- Kingdom: Animalia
- Phylum: Arthropoda
- Class: Insecta
- Order: Lepidoptera
- Family: Geometridae
- Genus: Eudulophasia
- Species: E. invaria

Binomial name
- Eudulophasia invaria (Walker, 1854)

Synonyms
- Ameria invaria Walker, 1854; Eudule invaria Godman & Salvin, 1885; Eudule aurora Burmeister 1878; Eudule moeschleri Kirby 1892; Eudule nigricosta Edwards 1884; Eudule unicolor Moschler 1878

= Eudulophasia invaria =

Species of moth

Eudulophasia invaria is a species of moth in the family Geometridae first described by Francis Walker in 1854.

== Description ==
It has a wingspan of 20–24 millimetres (0.79–0.94 in). The wings are bright orange with a narrow black border. Antennae, tarsi and tibiae are black.

== Distribution ==
This species can be found in Mexico, British Honduras, Guatemala, Costa Rica, Panama, Colombia and Venezuela.
