= Abuga Pele =

Ghanaian politician

Hon. Abuga Pele

Member of Parliament for Member of Parliament for Chiana-Paga Constituency
- In office 7 January 2013 – 6 January 2017
- President: John Mahama

Member of Parliament for Chiana-Paga Constituency
- In office 7 January 2005 – 6 January 2009
- President: John Kufuor

Personal details
- Born: 3 March 1958 (age 68)
- Party: National Democratic Congress
- Education: University of Ghana
- Profession: Administrator/ Manager

Abuga Pele (born March 3, 1958) is a Ghanaian politician and member of the Second, Third, Fourth, Fifth and Sixth Parliament of the Fourth Republic of Ghana representing the Chiana-Paga Constituency in the Upper East Region on the ticket of the National Democratic Congress.

== Early life and education ==
Pele was born on March 3, 1958. He hails from Paga Buru Nakolo, a village in the Upper East Region of Ghana. He entered University of Ghana and obtained his Master of Philosophy (MPhil) degree in 1988.

== Career ==
Pele is an administrator and manager by profession. He worked in the Internal Revenue Service as an inspector of taxes. He was the National Coordinator of Ghana Youth Employment and Entrepreneurial Development Agency (GYEEDA).

== Politics ==
Pele is a member of the National Democratic Congress. (NDC). In 2012, he contested for the Chiana/Paga seat on the ticket of the NDC in the sixth parliament of the fourth republic and won.

== Elections ==
He was first elected into Parliament during the December 1996 Ghanaian General Elections. He polled 19,362 votes representing 48.20% over his opponents Achinan Apiyese James who polled 5,625 votes representing 14.00%. He polled 15,391 votes representing 65.10% out of the 100% votes cast.

Pele was elected as the member of parliament for the Chiana-Paga constituency of the Upper East Region of Ghana in the 2004 Ghanaian general elections. He won on the ticket of the National Democratic Congress. His constituency was a part of the 9 parliamentary seats out of 13 seats won by the National Democratic Congress in that election for the Upper East Region. The National Democratic Congress won a minority total of 94 parliamentary seats out of 230 seats. He was elected with 11,824 votes out of 25,691 total valid votes cast. This was equivalent to 46% of total valid votes cast. He was elected over Anyoka Jerry of the Peoples’ National Convention, Allowe Leo Kabah of the New Patriotic Party, Desmond Ayirevire of the Convention People's Party and Alichima Martin an independent candidate. These obtained 1,212, 6,242, 333 and 6,080 votes respectively of total votes cast. These were equivalent to 4.7%, 24.3%, 1.3% and 23.7% respectively of total valid votes cast.

In 2012, he was elected as the member of parliament for the same constituency. He won on the ticket of the National Democratic Congress. He was elected with 21,552 votes out of 33,947 total valid votes cast. This was equivalent to 63.49% of total valid votes cast. He was elected over Francis Nagia Santuah of the Peoples’ National Convention, Allowe Leo Kabah of the New Patriotic Party, Aloah Adoa Muniru of the Progressive People's Party and Ayirevire Desmond of the Convention People's Party. These obtained 4,705, 7,246, 323 and 121 votes respectively of total votes cast. These were equivalent to 13.86%, 21.35%, 0.95% and 0.36% respectively of total valid votes cast.

== Personal life ==
Pele is an Eckanker. He is married with three children.

== Arrest and release ==
In 2018, Abuga was sentenced to a 6-year imprisonment for his involvement in causing financial loss to Ghana by an Accra High Court. He was found guilty on two counts of 'abetment of fraud' and five counts of 'willfully causing financial loss to the state'. He was jailed at the Nsawam Maximum Security Prison.

In July 2021, he received a presidential pardon by Nana Akufo-Addo on health grounds. He was taken to the Greater Accra Regional Hospital after he faced health issues and was in a critical condition at the HDU of the health facility.
