= Babatu (warlord) =

19th century military leader

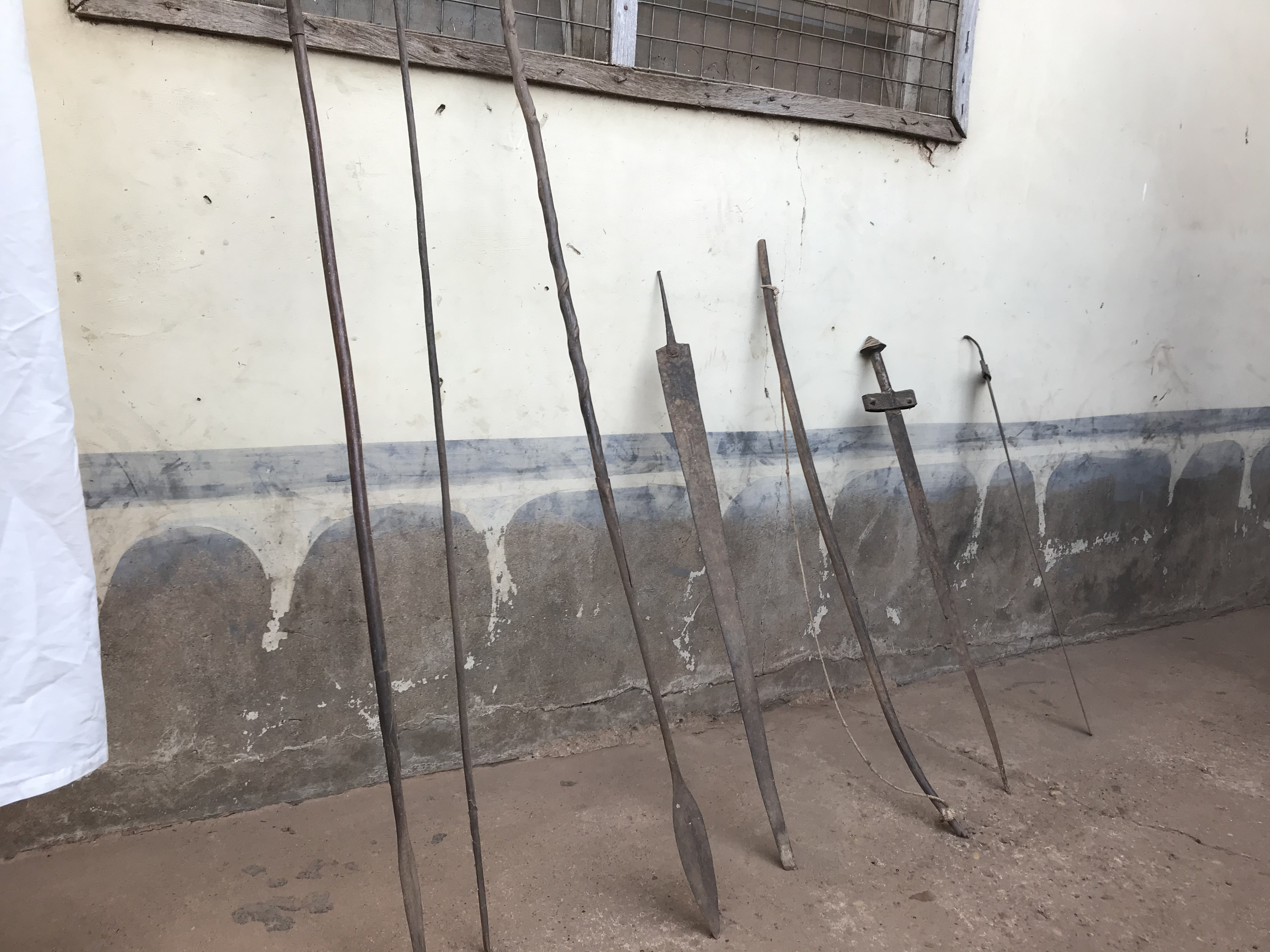
Tools Babatu used to capture slaves

Babatu or Baba Ato, was the Zarma military leader over the Zabarma Emirate in the late 19th century. Babatu originated in Indougou (N'Dougou) in what is today the nation of Niger. Babatu became the ruler of the Zabarima emirate in 1878 after the death of the former ruler, Gazari. He was a slaver and fought against Sandema warriors.

In 1887 his forces raided Wa the capital of the Kingdom of Wala and caused much of the population to flee.

== Personal life ==
According to historians, Babatu was born in 1850 and began his expeditions in the 1880s. He wore tribal marks which he created himself. He also expected soldiers and slaves to wear uniform marks with their leaders. He thought it was necessary. He was Muslim but it did not prevent him from attacking other Muslims.

== Battles ==
According to oral traditions and written sources, Babatu carried out many attacks on some Builsa villages such as:

- Battle of Sandema
- Battle of Kanjaga
- Chuchuliga: Babatu defeated an army consisting of warriors who were unified from Chuchuliga, Navrongo and Paga. It is claimed this battle was probably part of his Navrongo campaign.
- Wiesi: The conquest of Wiesi and Kunkwa took place "four or five years before the whites came to fight the Zabarimas".
- Kunkwa: In a battle on a small river, the inhabitants of Kunkwa offered Babatu's troops fierce resistance, and both Babatu's son Ishaka as well as the chief of Kunkwa lost their lives but in the end, Kunkwa was defeated.
- Siniensi: After the conquest of Siniensi, there was a dispute between two Zabarima leaders. It is claimed Babatu gave the village to a son of his predecessor.
- Fumbisi: it was said although the chief of Fumbisi sacrificed a white bull to his drum before the battle, he lost it and was killed.

== Death ==
He suffered a number of defeats as his power began to decline and also because of the influence in Northern Ghana. He fled to a town called Yendi and after to a town in present-day Togo. He died from a spider bite in 1907.
