= Chuchuliga, Ghana =

Village in Ghana

Coordinates: 10°48′58″N 1°10′49″W

Chuchuliga is a village in the Upper East Region of Ghana.
