= Sandema =

- District Capital
- Location of Sandema in Upper East region
- Coordinates: 10°44′N 01°17′W
- Country: Ghana
- Region: Upper East Region
- District: Builsa North District

Population (2013)
  - Total: —
- Time zone: GMT
  - Summer (DST): GMT

Sandema is the capital town of Builsa North District, a district in the Upper East Region of Ghana.

== Education ==
The town of Sandema has several educational institutions ranging from Day Care facilities to second cycle institutions. There are three second cycle institutions, the oldest being the Sandema Senior High/Technical School. The Sandema Senior High School and the Youth Leadership Training Institute are the other two. There is no tertiary institution in the town yet. The school is a second cycle institution. Some basic schools in the area are Sandema Preparatory Junior High School and Success International Junior High School.

Sandema is the seat of the Paramount Chief of the Builsa traditional area. The people of Sandema speak the Buli language which is a member of the Kwa language group. There is also a sizable resident population of people of Moore origin in the town who are mainly Muslim.

== Notable Places ==
The Chief's Palace; the Sandema Chief's Palace is located in the center of Sandema and is known as the Abil-Yeri community. The palace is the home of the overlord of the entire Builsa lands (Nab Azantilow Azagsug II), son of the late Dr. Nab Ayieta Azantilow, known for his bravery during the World War.

== Notable events ==
The Fiok festival takes place annually in December to commemorate the victory of Builsa forces over the slave raider Babatu in the Battle of Sandema in the 1890s. In the event, costumed men from across the district carry ancient armaments and perform dances.
