= Fumbisi =

Town in the Builsa South District, Ghana

- Town
- Fumbisi
- Location within Ghana
- Country: Ghana
- Region: Upper East Region
- District: Builsa South District
- Time zone: GMT
  - Summer (DST): GMT

Fumbisi is a town in the Builsa South District in the Upper East Region of Ghana. The town is known for rice production. In 2019, the Paramount Chief of Fumbisi was Nab Clement Anyatuik Akanko II. Dr. Clement Abas Apaak (NDC) is the parliamentary Member of the Builsa South District.

== Institutions ==
- St. Peter & Paul Parish
- Fumbisi Health Care Center
- Fumbisi Senior High School
- Fumbisi Rice Mill factory
- Fumbisi Rice Valley
- Fumbisi Market
- Fumbisi Police Station
- Fumbisi Clinic
- Fumbisi District Hospital

== Festival ==
The people of Fumbisi celebrate the Feok Festival.
