= 2012 World Monuments Watch =

Nonprofit advocacy program

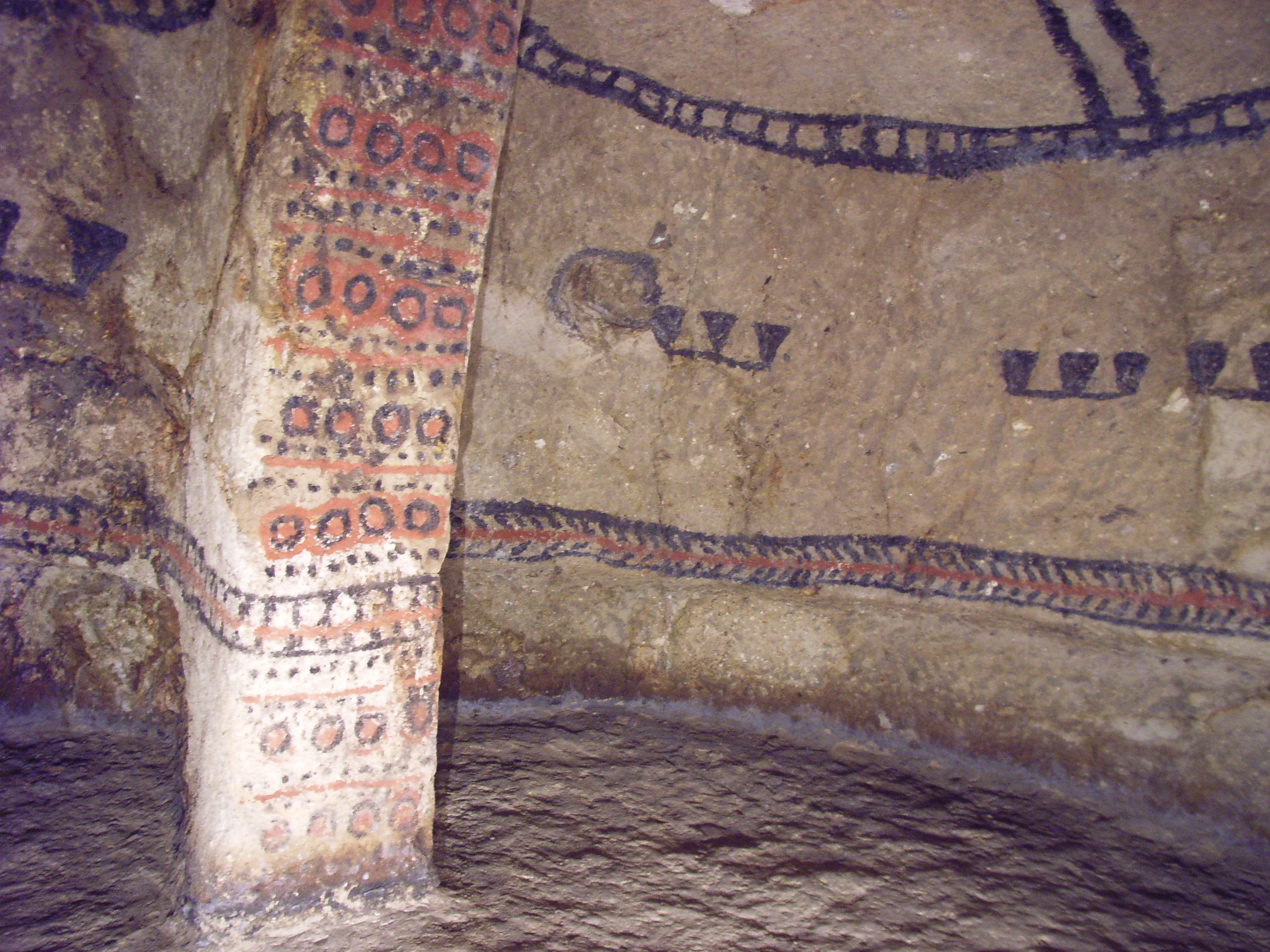
Tierradentro Archaeological Park in Cauca Department, Colombia, features underground tombs dating from 6th to 9th centuries AD.

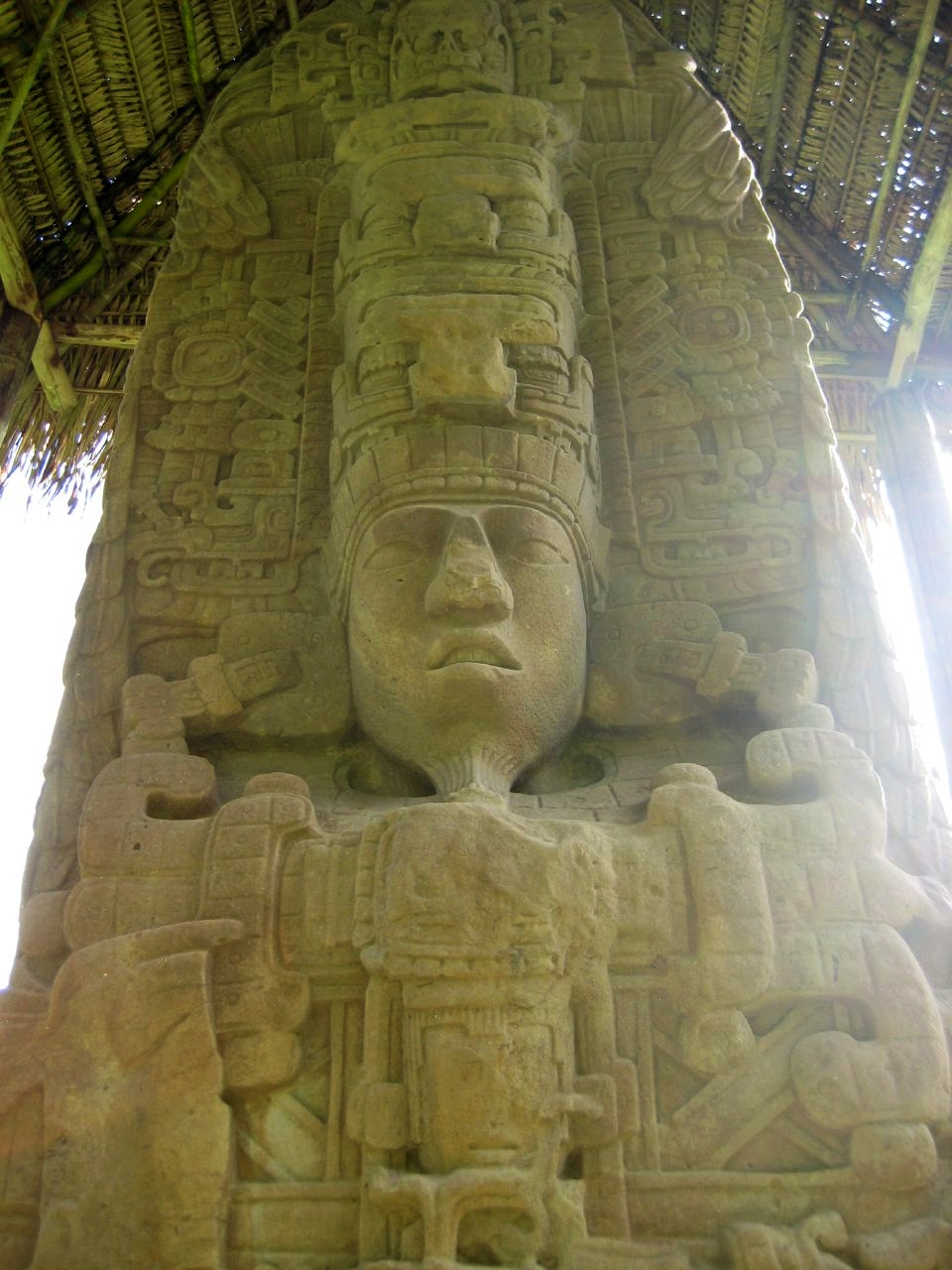
Quiriguá is an ancient Maya archaeological site in Guatemala, it covers approximately 3 square kilometres (1.2 sq mi) and contains a wealth of sculpture, including the tallest stone monuments ever erected in the New World.

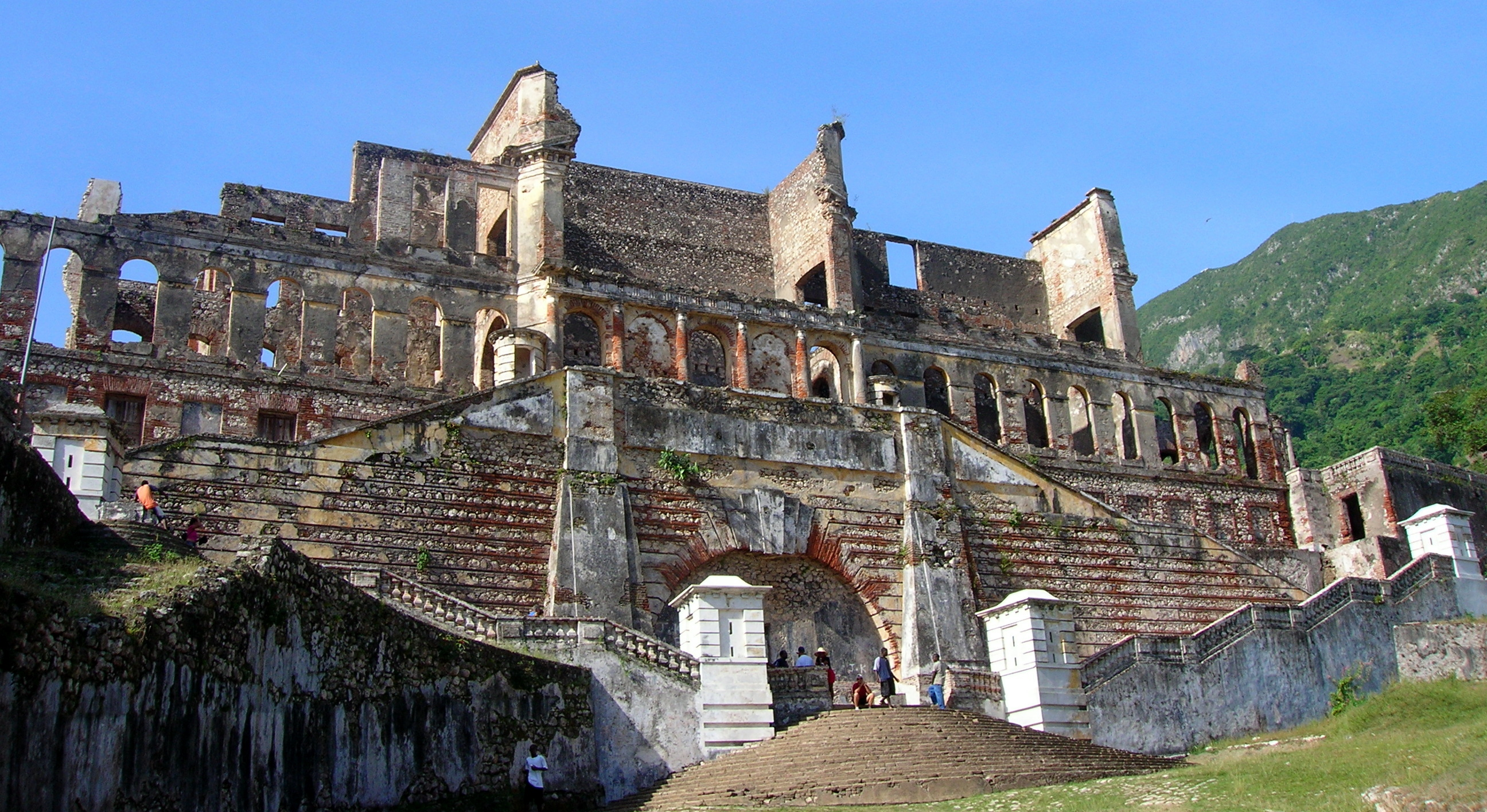
The Sans-Souci Palace was the royal residence of King Henri Christophe of Haiti. Its name translated from French means "carefree."

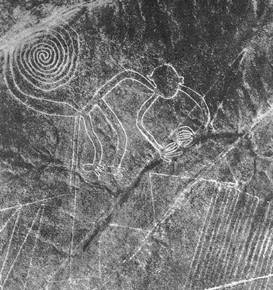
The Nazca Lines, Peru are a series of ancient geoglyphs located in the Nazca Desert in southern Peru. They were designated a UNESCO World Heritage Site in 1994.

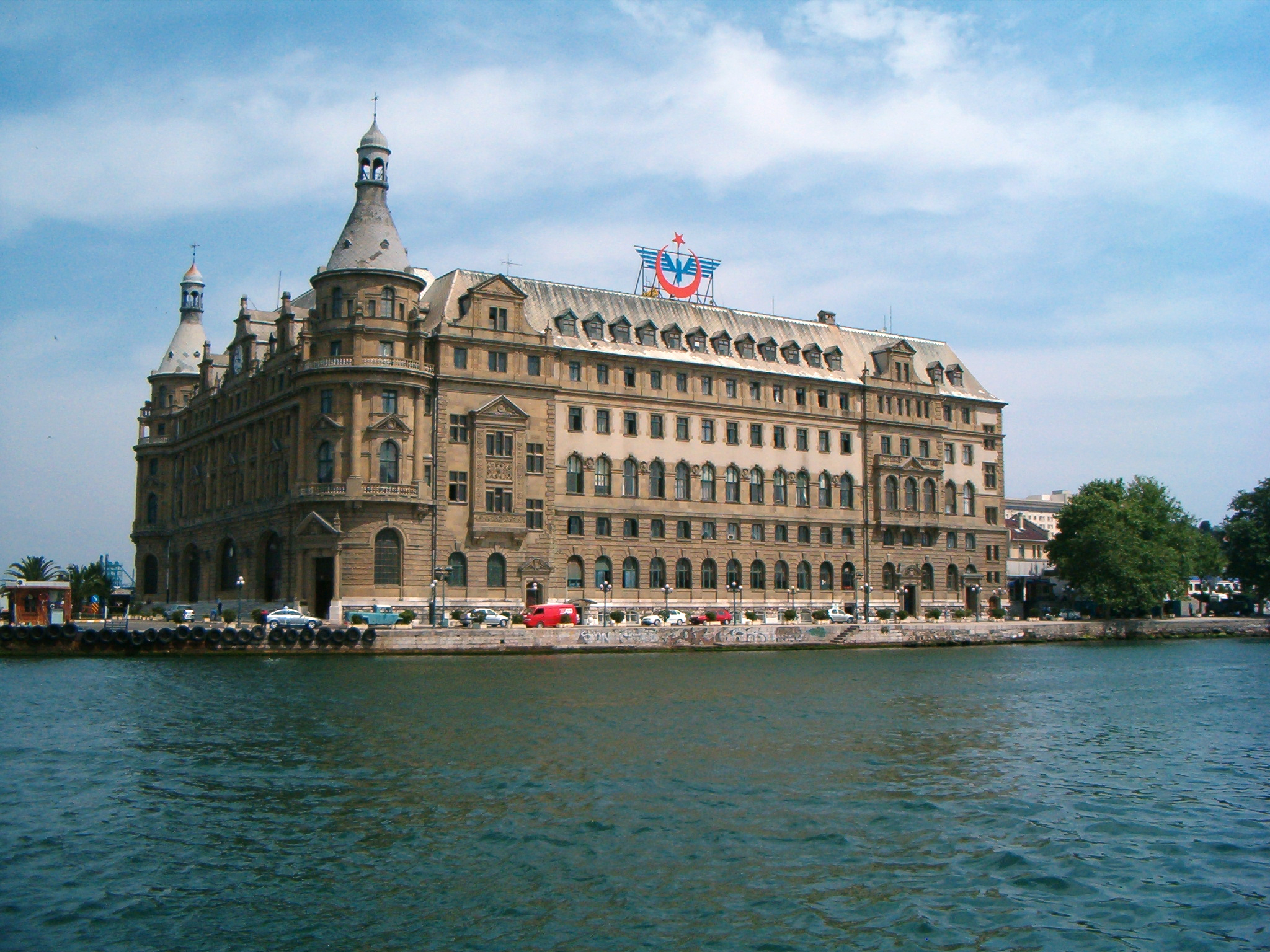
Haydarpaşa railway station, Istanbul, Turkey, was rebuilt 1906-1909 in a Neoclassical style on land reclaimed from the sea.

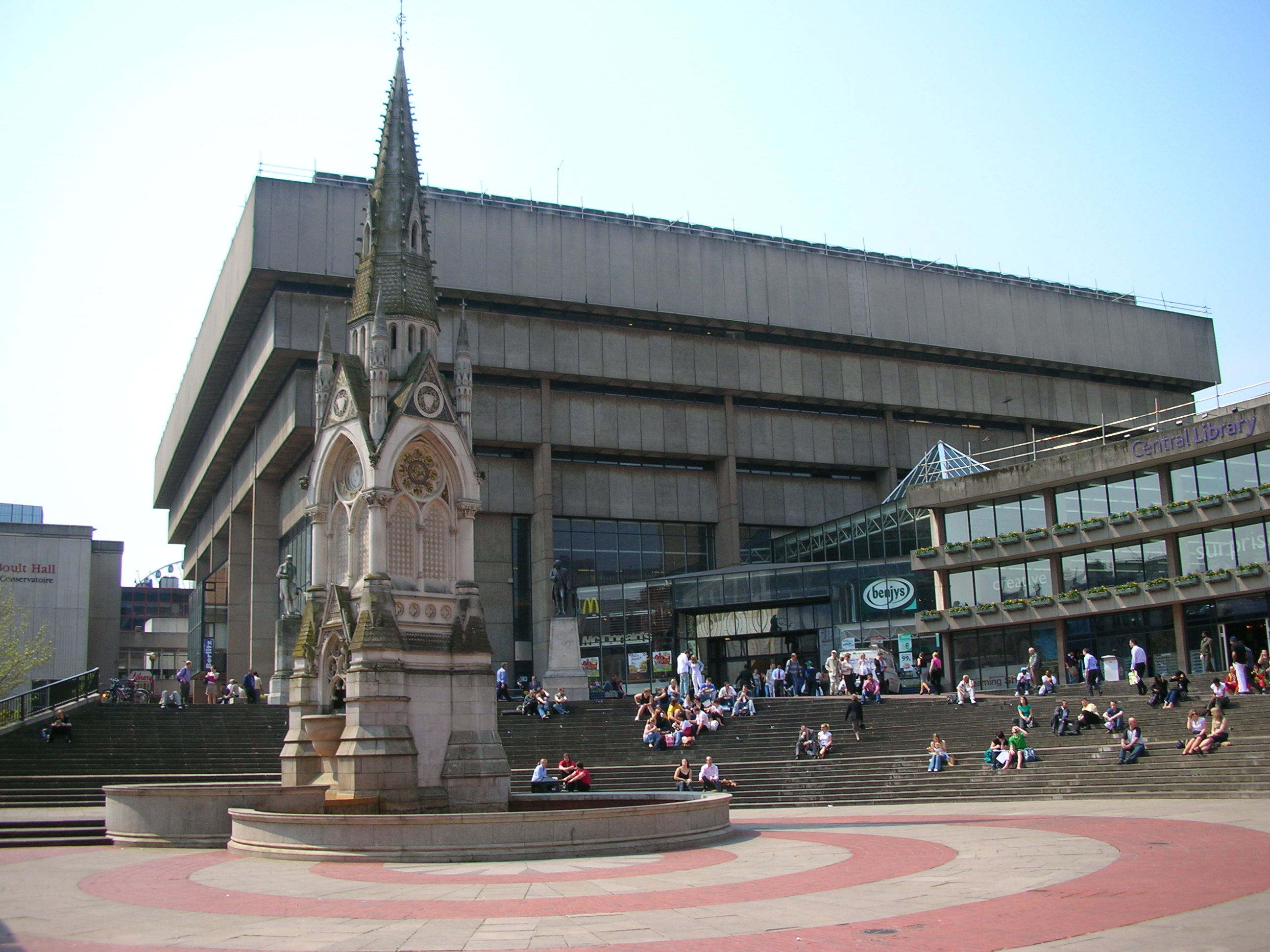
Birmingham Central Library, built 1969-1973 and designed by John Madin. It is an example of UK Brutalist architecture which flourished from the 1950s to the mid-1970s.

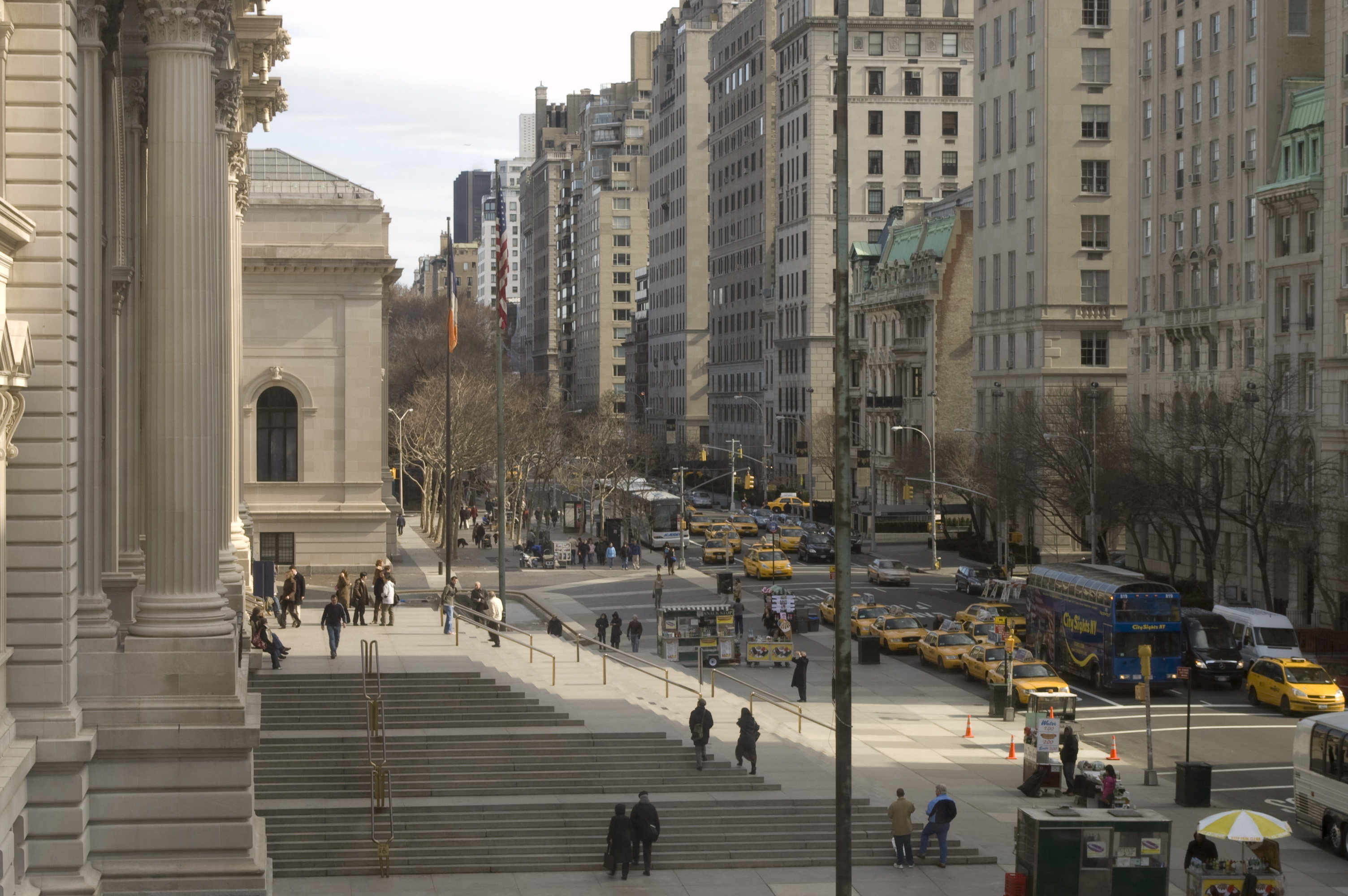
Fifth Avenue is a major thoroughfare in the center of the borough of Manhattan in New York City, United States. In 2008, Forbes magazine ranked Fifth Avenue as being the most expensive street in the world.

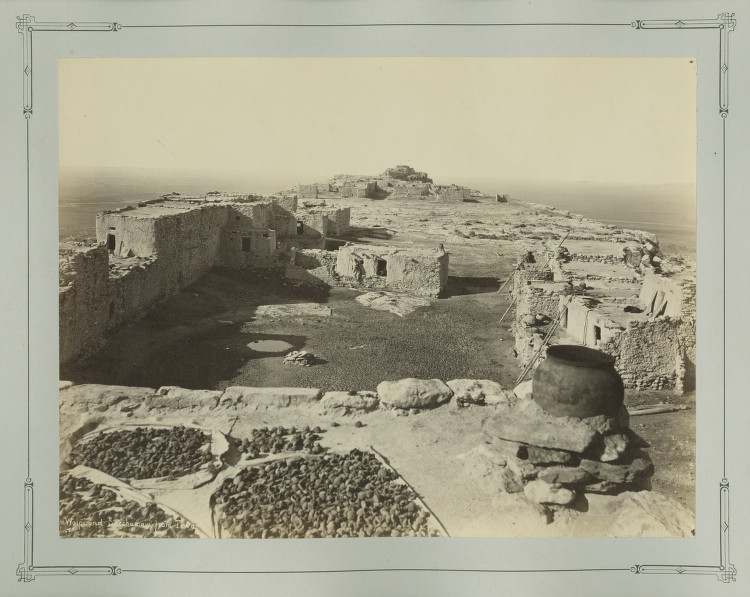
Walpi, Arizona, circa 1877, photographed by John K. Hillers. It is one of the oldest continuously inhabited villages in the United States.

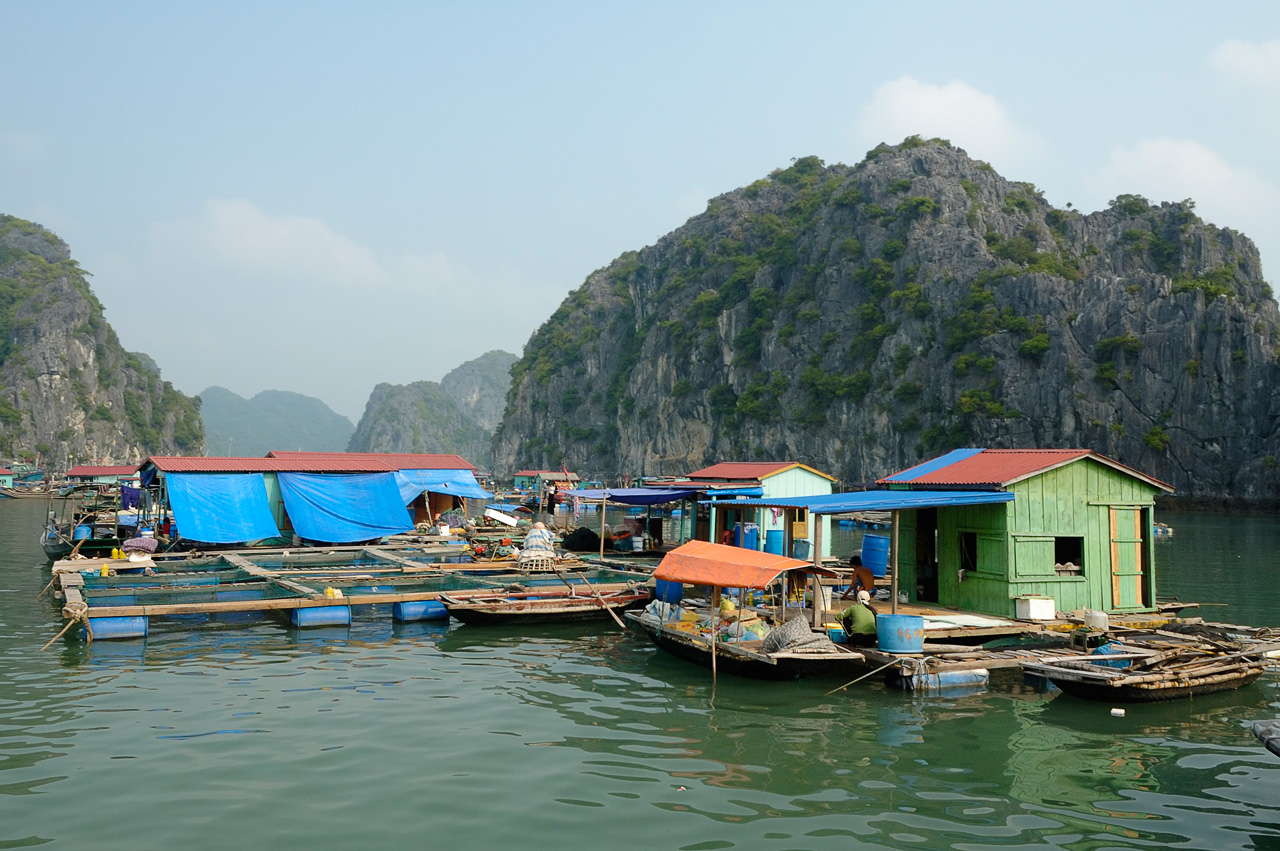
Around 1,600 people live on Hạ Long Bay, Vietnam in four fishing villages made up of floating houses and are sustained through fishing and marine farming.

The World Monuments Watch is a flagship advocacy program of the New York-based private non-profit organization World Monuments Fund (WMF) that calls international attention to cultural heritage around the world that is threatened by neglect, vandalism, conflict, or disaster.

== Selection process ==
Every two years, it publishes a select list known as the Watch List of Endangered Sites that are in urgent need of preservation funding and protection. The sites are nominated by governments, conservation professionals, site caretakers, non-government organizations (NGOs), concerned individuals, and others working in the field. An independent panel of international experts then select 100 candidates from these entries to be part of the Watch List, based on the significance of the sites, the urgency of the threat, and the viability of both advocacy and conservation solutions. For the succeeding two-year period until a new Watch List is published, these 100 sites can avail grants and funds from the WMF, as well as from other foundations, private donors, and corporations by capitalizing on the publicity and attention gained from the inclusion on the Watch List.

== 2012 Watch List ==
The 2012 Watch List was published on 5 October 2011.

Country/Territory	Site	Location
Argentina	Casa sobre el Arroyo	Mar del Plata, Buenos Aires Province
Argentina	City of La Plata	La Plata, Buenos Aires Province
Argentina	Pucará de Tilcara	Quebrada de Humahuaca, Jujuy Province
Belize	Historic architecture of Belize City	Belize City
Benin	Akaba Idéna	Kétou, Plateau Department
Bhutan	Wangduechhoeling Palace	Jakar, Bumthang District
Bolivia	El Fuerte de Samaipata	Samaipata, Santa Cruz Department
Brazil	Historic center of Salvador De Bahia	Salvador, State of Bahia
Burkina Faso	Cour Royale de Tiébélé	Tiébélé, Centre-Sud Region
Cayman Islands	Mind's Eye	George Town, Grand Cayman
China	Archaeological site of the palace of Nanyue Kingdom	Guangzhou, Guangdong Province
China	Tiantai An	Wangqu, Shanxi Province
Colombia	Historic center of Santa Cruz de Mompox	Santa Cruz de Mompox, Bolívar Department
Colombia	Paeces chapels of Tierradentro	Páez Municipality, near Belalcázar, Cauca Department
Cuba	Parish Church of San Juan Bautista de los Remedios	San Juan de los Remedios, Villa Clara Province
Dominican Republic	Parish Church of San Dionisio	Higüey, La Altagracia Province
Ghana	Asante traditional buildings	near Kumasi, Ashanti Region
Greece	First Cemetery of Athens	Athens
Guatemala	Archaeological park and ruins of Quiriguá	Los Amates, Izabal Department
Guatemala	El Zotz	Petén Department
Haiti	Gingerbread Neighborhood	Port-au-Prince
Haiti	Jacmel historic district	Jacmel
Haiti	Palace Of Sans Souci	Milot
India	Bagh-I-Hafiz Rakhna	Sirhind-Fategarh, Punjab
India	Balaji Ghat	Varanasi, Uttar Pradesh
India	Historic Havelis of Bikaner	Bikaner, Rajasthan
India	Royal Opera House	Mumbai, Maharashtra
Indonesia	Desa Lingga	Karo Regency, North Sumatra Province
Japan	Hirakushi Denchū house and atelier	Taitō, Tokyo
Japan	East Japan earthquake heritage sites	Tōhoku and Kantō Regions
Japan	Machiya townhouses	Kyoto
Jordan	Abila	Quweilbeh, Irbid Governorate
Kazakhstan	Necropolises of nomads in Mangystau	Mangystau Province, Kazakhstan
Macedonia	Stobi	Gradsko
Madagascar	Royal hill of Ambohimanga	Ambohimanga Rova, Antananarivo Province
Mexico	Colonial bridge of Tequixtepec	San Miguel Tequixtepec, Oaxaca
Mexico	Ruta de la Amistad	Mexico City
Netherlands	Beth Haim Portuguese Jewish Cemetery	Ouderkerk aan de Amstel, North Holland
New Zealand	Canterbury provincial government buildings	Christchurch, Canterbury
Palestinian Territory	Tell Umm el-'Amr (Saint Hilarion Monastery)	Nuseirat, Gaza Strip
Panama	Way On Cemetery	Panama City
Peru	Alameda de los Descalzos and Paseo de Aguas	Rímac, Lima
Peru	Lines and geoglyphs of Nasca	Nazca, Ica Region
Peru	Quinta de Presa	Rímac, Lima
Poland	St. Parascheva church	Radruż, Subcarpathian Voivodeship
Portugal	Jardim Botânico de Lisboa	Lisbon
Saint Helena	Saint Helena	Saint Helena
Spain	Barrio del Cabanyal-Canyamelar	Valencia
Spain	Berrocal de Trujillo	Trujillo, Extremadura
Tunisia	Old town of Testour	Testour, Béja Governorate
Turkey	Haydarpaşa Railway Station	Istanbul
Turkey	Oshki monastery	Çamlıyamaç, Erzurum Province
Turkey	Rum Orphanage	Büyükada, Princes' Islands, Istanbul
Turkmenistan	Ulug Depe	near Dushak, Ahal Province
United Kingdom	British Brutalism (Birmingham Central Library, Preston bus station, Hayward Gallery)	Birmingham, Preston, and London, England
United Kingdom	Newstead Abbey	Ravenshead, Nottinghamshire
United Kingdom	Quarr Abbey	Ryde, Isle of Wight
United Kingdom	Ruins of the former cathedral church of St. Michael, Coventry	Coventry, West Midlands
United States	510 Fifth Avenue	New York, New York
United States	Charleston Historic District	Charleston, South Carolina
United States	Manitoga	Garrison, New York
United States	New York Studio School of Drawing, Painting and Sculpture	New York, New York
United States	Orange County Government Center	Goshen, New York
United States	Walpi village	Navajo County, Arizona
Vietnam	Fishing villages of Hạ Long Bay	Hạ Long Bay, Quảng Ninh Province
Yemen	Mosque and hammam Al-Mudhaffar	Ta'izz, Ta'izz Governorate
Zimbabwe	Nalatale ruins	near Gweru, Matabeleland North

== Statistics by country/territory ==
The following countries/territories have multiple sites entered on the 2012 Watch List, listed by the number of sites:

Number of sites	Country/Territory
6	United States
4	India
4	United Kingdom
3	Argentina
3	Haiti
3	Japan
3	Peru
2	China
2	Colombia
2	Guatemala
2	Turkey
2	Mexico
2	Spain
