= Pô =

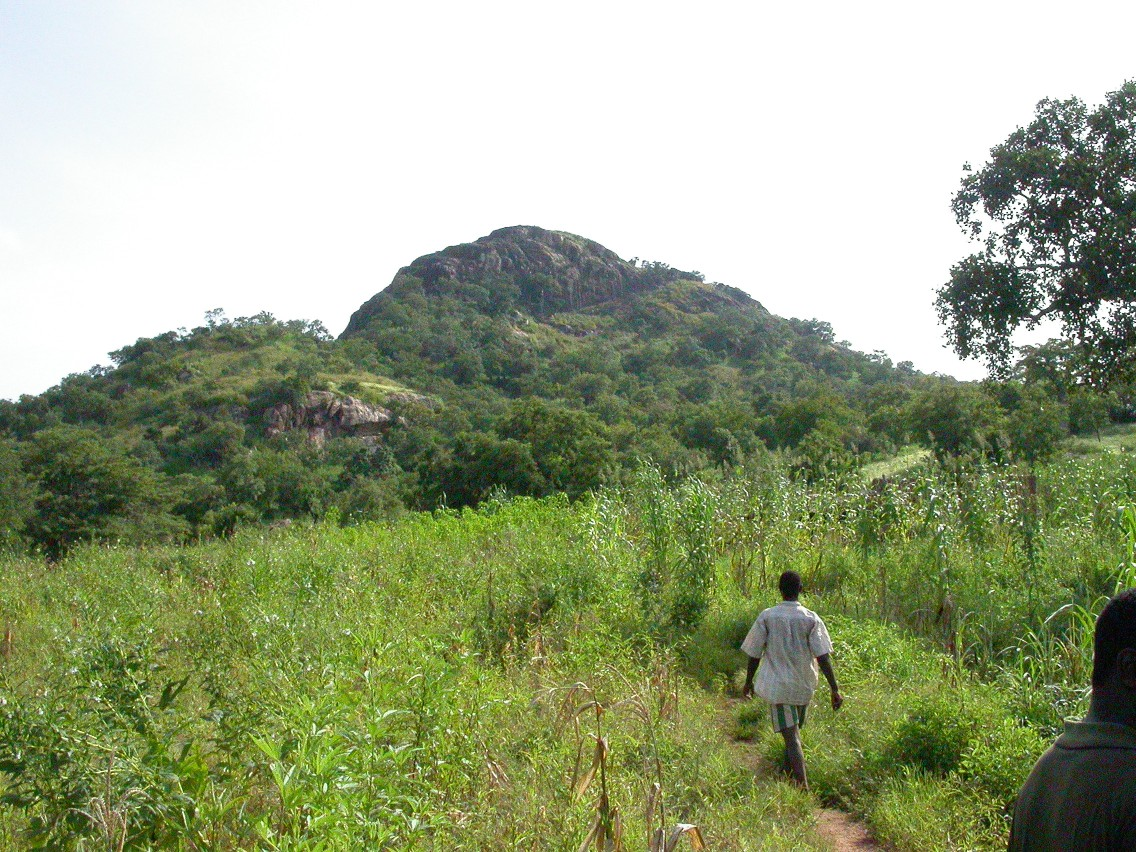
- Pic de Nahouri

- Location within Burkina Faso
- Coordinates: 11°10′N 1°09′W
- Country: Burkina Faso
- Elevation: 305 m (1,001 ft)

Population (2019 census)
  - Total: 28,079
- Time zone: UTC+0 (GMT)

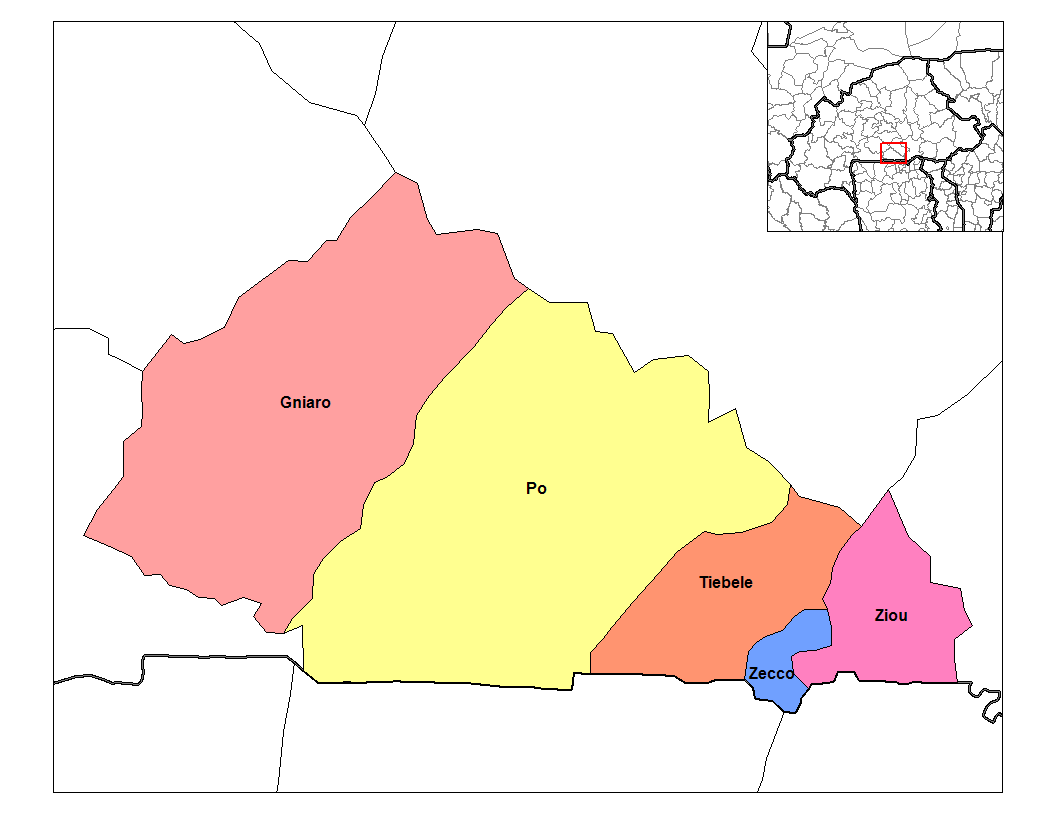
Departments of Nahouri: Pô (department) is marked by yellow

Pô is a city in southern Burkina Faso. It is the capital of the province of Nahouri. The main ethnic group (making about 60% of the inhabitants) is the Kasséna, a group close to the Gurunsi. It is said to have been founded in around 1500 and is home to an army base, including the Académie militaire Georges Namoano.

In 1983, an army unit under Blaise Compaoré led a rebellion which resulted in Thomas Sankara's release from prison and ascension to the presidency.

On October 31, 2014 Compaoré announced he had left the presidency and that there was a "power vacuum"; he also called for a "free and transparent" election within 90 days. Yacouba Isaac Zida then took over the reins as head of state in an interim capacity. It was reported that a heavily armed convoy believed to be carrying Compaoré was traveling towards the southern town of Pô. However, it diverted before reaching the town and he then fled to Ivory Coast with the support of President Alassane Ouattara.

"Pô Department", centered on Po, is one of five departments within the province of Nahouri in the Centre-Sud Region of Burkina Faso. It is located on the border with Ghana.

Pô National Park lies near the town.

== Climate ==
Pô has an increasingly hot dry season and a warm, wet season. The warmest month is April, with an average high of 38 C (100.4 F), and an average low of 26 C (78.8 F). The coolest month, and wettest month is August, with a high of 30 C (86 F), a low of 22 C (71.6 F) and rainfall of 241 mm. Humidity is high in the wet season.

Climate data for Pô (1991–2020)
Month	Jan	Feb	Mar	Apr	May	Jun	Jul	Aug	Sep	Oct	Nov	Dec	Year
Record high °C (°F)	40.7 (105.3)	42.4 (108.3)	42.7 (108.9)	43.1 (109.6)	43.4 (110.1)	43.8 (110.8)	36.2 (97.2)	35.7 (96.3)	37.0 (98.6)	38.4 (101.1)	39.0 (102.2)	38.8 (101.8)	43.8 (110.8)
Mean daily maximum °C (°F)	34.1 (93.4)	36.7 (98.1)	38.9 (102.0)	38.4 (101.1)	36.1 (97.0)	33.3 (91.9)	31.0 (87.8)	30.2 (86.4)	31.3 (88.3)	34.2 (93.6)	36.2 (97.2)	34.6 (94.3)	34.6 (94.3)
Daily mean °C (°F)	26.1 (79.0)	29.1 (84.4)	32.0 (89.6)	32.2 (90.0)	30.5 (86.9)	28.2 (82.8)	26.5 (79.7)	25.8 (78.4)	26.4 (79.5)	28.0 (82.4)	28.1 (82.6)	26.4 (79.5)	28.3 (82.9)
Mean daily minimum °C (°F)	18.5 (65.3)	21.6 (70.9)	25.2 (77.4)	26.2 (79.2)	25.1 (77.2)	23.2 (73.8)	22.4 (72.3)	22.0 (71.6)	21.9 (71.4)	22.3 (72.1)	20.6 (69.1)	18.5 (65.3)	22.3 (72.1)
Record low °C (°F)	12.4 (54.3)	15.0 (59.0)	16.6 (61.9)	18.7 (65.7)	19.2 (66.6)	18.0 (64.4)	19.0 (66.2)	19.0 (66.2)	18.6 (65.5)	17.4 (63.3)	14.6 (58.3)	12.5 (54.5)	12.4 (54.3)
Average precipitation mm (inches)	0.4 (0.02)	3.5 (0.14)	11.9 (0.47)	54.0 (2.13)	98.9 (3.89)	141.3 (5.56)	196.5 (7.74)	293.6 (11.56)	180.3 (7.10)	54.7 (2.15)	1.0 (0.04)	0.6 (0.02)	1,036.7 (40.81)
Average precipitation days (≥ 1.0 mm)	0.1	0.3	1.0	3.8	6.6	8.6	11.6	13.8	12.3	5.5	0.3	0.0	63.9
Average relative humidity (%)	22	20	30	45	59	72	80	84	83	70	42	26	52
Mean monthly sunshine hours	274.9	243.4	247.3	233.1	249.6	231.6	206.7	179.6	203.6	264.5	277.1	285.9	2,897.3
Source 1: NOAA
Source 2: Deutscher Wetterdienst (humidity, 1983–1994)
