= Nagila =

Nagila is a recreational dance by the Kassena and Frafra people of the Upper East region in Ghana. This dance genre is performed mostly at festivals and other times for entertainment purposes. The Nagila dance is a solo act in which the dancer stamps his feet on the ground in a rhythmic motion and in interaction with the drums.

Nagila Traditional Dance

== Movement ==
A Nagila dancer who takes center bends his or her upper body forward such that his hips and thigh form a right angle. The dancer then holds his or her elbows in front or behind and stamps his or her feet on the ground in a rhythmic pattern. A dancer usually dances for 30 seconds after which the musical instruments play for a while. To signal that a dancer is ready to resume dancing, the drums sounds louder. The dance is resumed this way for about six times after which a new dancer takes the center.
