= List of World Heritage Sites in Burkina Faso =

Location of World Heritage Sites in Burkina Faso. Blue dots represent the Ancient Ferrous Metallurgy Sites and the green dot is a natural site.

The United Nations Educational, Scientific and Cultural Organization (UNESCO) designates World Heritage Sites of outstanding universal value to cultural or natural heritage which have been nominated by countries which are signatories to the UNESCO World Heritage Convention, established in 1972. Cultural heritage consists of monuments (such as architectural works, monumental sculptures, or inscriptions), groups of buildings, and sites (including archaeological sites). Natural features (consisting of physical and biological formations), geological and physiographical formations (including habitats of threatened species of animals and plants), and natural sites which are important from the point of view of science, conservation or natural beauty, are defined as natural heritage. Burkina Faso ratified the convention on 2 April 1987.

Burkina Faso has four sites on the list and a further eight sites on the tentative list. The first property listed in Burkina Faso was the Ruins of Loropéni, in 2009. The W-Arly-Pendjari Complex, which is shared with Benin and Niger, is a natural site. The other three sites were listed for their cultural significance. Burkina Faso has served on the World Heritage Committee once.

== World Heritage Sites ==
UNESCO lists sites under ten criteria; each entry must meet at least one of the criteria. Criteria i through vi are cultural, and vii through x are natural.

* Transnational site

World Heritage Sites
Site	Image	Location (region)	Year listed	UNESCO data	Description
Ruins of Loropéni	Remains of a wall, partially surrounded by trees	Sud-Ouest	2009	1225rev; iii (cultural)	The complex of ruins in Loropéni is the best preserved example of medieval fortified settlements in West Africa. These settlements date at least to the 11th century and flourished between the 14th and 17th centuries due to gold mining and Trans-Saharan trade during the Ghana, Mali, and Songhai empires. The site was finally abandoned in the 19th century and has been only partially excavated.
W-Arly-Pendjari Complex*	Arli River surrounded by lush vegetation	Est	2017	749ter; ix, x (natural)	This site comprises Niger's W National Park, Burkina Faso's Arli National Park, and Benin's Pendjari National Park. The W National Park was listed independent from the other sites in 1997, but Arli and Pendjari national parks were added in 2017. The area covers large expanses of Sudano-Sahelian savanna with grasslands, wood savanna, shrublands, riparian forests, and gallery forests. The landscape has been shaped by human activity for tens of thousands of years, with fires being crucial for maintaining diverse vegetation. The parks are home to healthy populations of large mammals, including the African elephant, lion, cheetah, African wild dog, and topi antelope.
Ancient Ferrous Metallurgy Sites of Burkina Faso		Nord, Centre-Nord	2019	1602; iii, iv, vi (cultural)	Iron metallurgy in Africa dates to prehistoric times. This site comprises five properties. The oldest of them is in Douroula, from the 8th century BCE, when the technology was already widely present in the region. The other four sites are from the second millennium CE. They are large complexes with elevated ore smelting furnaces, slag assemblies, and traces of mining. Local blacksmiths do not practice ore smelting anymore, but are important in preserving ancient rituals and practices, as well as playing a major role in supplying tools to the communities.
Royal Court of Tiébélé	Adobe buildings painted with geometric patterns	Centre-Sud	2024	1713; iii (cultural)	The complex was founded in the 16th century by the Kassena people and comprises residential buildings that are distinct for different social groups, sacred sites such as the royal cemetery, sacred stones on which dignitaries sit, and the tomb of the founder of the royal family. The buildings are in adobe and are constructed by men, while the decoration of the walls with traditional motifs is done exclusively by women.

== Tentative List ==
In addition to sites inscribed on the World Heritage List, member states can maintain a list of tentative sites that they may consider for nomination. Nominations for the World Heritage List are only accepted if the site was previously listed on the tentative list. Burkina Faso maintains eight properties on its tentative list.

Tentative sites
Site	Image	Location (region)	Year listed	UNESCO criteria	Description
Bourzanga necropolises		Centre-Nord	1996	iii, iv (cultural)	This nomination comprises two necropolises at Bourzanga. One is a Dogon burial ground containing burial jars where the body was positioned vertically or horizontally. The other necropolis, located nearby, is characterized by numerous stelae. They are made of granite and two of laterite, of irregular shapes, up to 1.5 m (4 ft 11 in) tall, and do not have any inscriptions or figures on them.
Rock engravings of the Burkinabè Sahel: Pobé-Mengao, Arbinda and Markoye		Sahel	2012	ii, iii (cultural)	This nomination comprises sites with rock art. Motifs include plants, animals, human figures, and geometric patterns. Those in Pobé-Mengao were created before the 12th century, those in Aribinda around the 14th century, while those in Markoye were dated between the 7th and 13th centuries. Artistic style is similar to that of southern Sahara, indicating a cultural exchange.
Rock art in Burkina Faso		Guiriko, Liptako, Soum, Tannounyan	2026	ii, iii (cultural)	The nomination comprises five clusters with rock art. Some of them were dated to be created before the 12th century CE. Petroglyphs depict animals, plants, and geometric patterns. Remains of housing and burial grounds have been found near one of the sites.
Classified forest of Mare aux Hippopotames	A pond with trees in the back	Guiriko	2026	ix, x (natural)	The reserve is centred around a freshwater lake which is also protected as a Ramsar wetland. Other habitat types include wooded savanna and gallery forests. The reserve is an important habitat for water and savanna birds, and is visited by infrequent species in Burkina Faso, such as the lesser jacana and Narina trogon. There is a community of hippopotamuses living in the reserve.
La Maison du Peuple	An orange theater building	Kadiogo	2026	iv (cultural)	The building, designed by the French architect René Faublée, was completed in 1965. It combines the concepts of modern architecture with local vernacular traditions. It is owned by the African Democratic Rally political party.
Sudanese style mosques in Burkina Faso		Bankuy, Guiriko, Nando, Nazinon	2026	ii, iv (cultural)	This nomination comprises ten mosques in the Sudano-Sahelian style. They are made of wood and adobe and are maintained by local communities.
Sya, Historic Center of Bobo-Dioulasso	An adobe mosque with sticks poking out of it	Guiriko	2026	iii, vi (cultural)	The economic capital of the country, Bobo-Dioulasso, developed around traditional villages that have been inhabited for centuries. Typical buildings are made of cob with roof terraces and supported by wooden beams and poles. People of different ethnicities and religions reside in Sya, with Muslims (the Grand Mosque from 1892 pictured), Christians, and adherents of traditional religions living together peacefully.
The Architectural Village of Koumi		Guiriko	2026	ii, iii, iv (cultural)	Koumi is a traditional village of the Bobo people. Houses are made of wood and adobe and are one or two-storied. The community preserves their local traditions despite the rapid urbanization.
