= Royal Court of Tiébélé =

UNESCO World Heritage Site
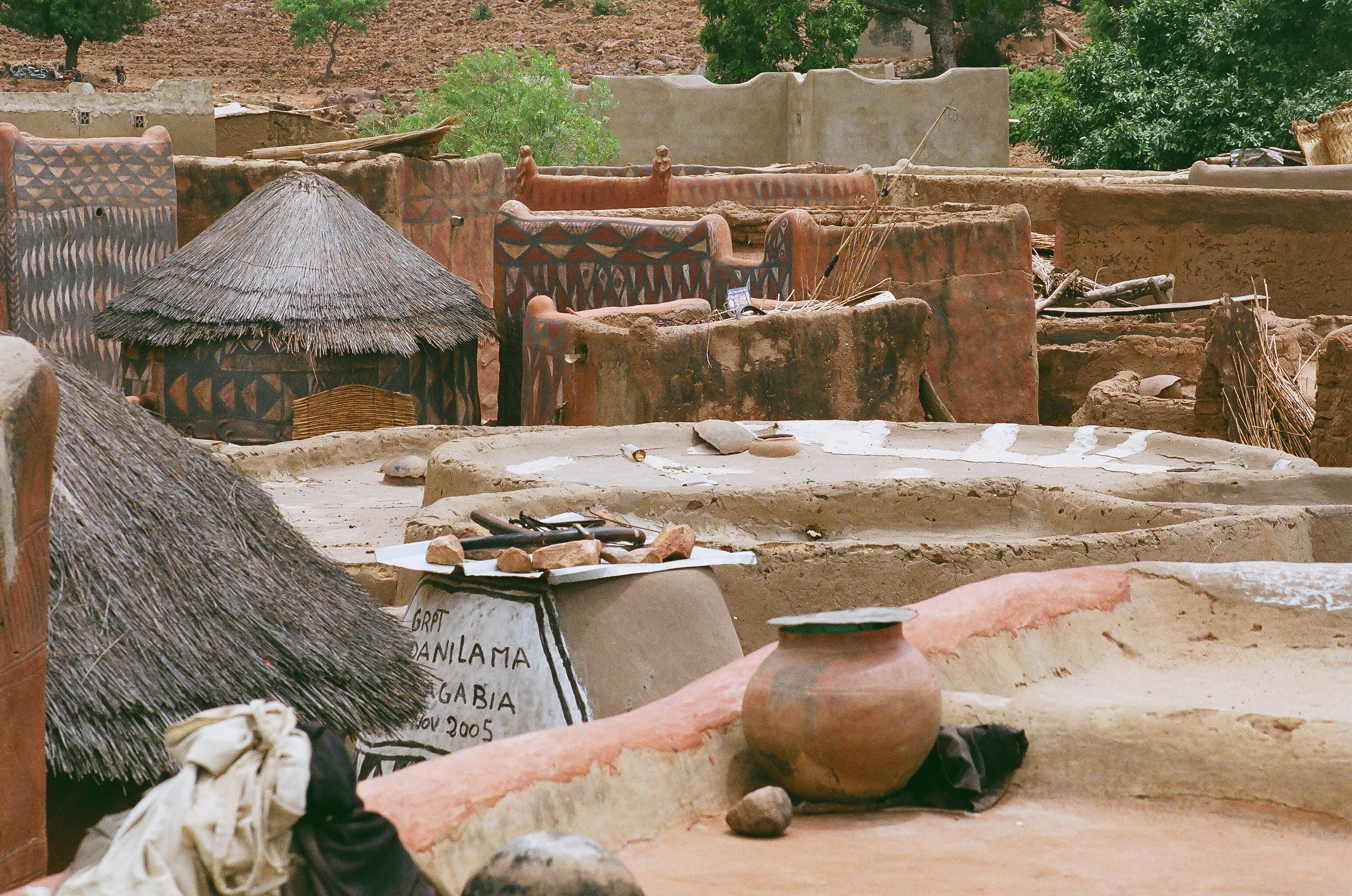
- View of the complex in 2016.

- Location within Burkina Faso
- Location: Tiébélé, Nahouri Province, Centre-Sud Region, Burkina Faso
- Criteria: Cultural: (iii)
- Reference: 1713
- Inscription: 2024 (46th Session)
- Coordinates: 11.095278°N 0.963611°W

The Royal Court of Tiébélé is a traditional Kassena architectural complex located in the town of Tiébélé, in the Centre-Sud Region of Burkina Faso. This traditional complex consists of the residence and court of the Kassena king (Pè) and other royal family members, mausoleums, memorials, shrines, and other traditional adobe structures such as sacred groves and stone courts. The adobe structures of the complex are also renown for their traditionally decorated and painted walls, a craft that is done exclusively by women. The traditional royal court ensemble was proclaimed a World Heritage Site by UNESCO in 2024.

== History ==
The complex is more than 500 years old, being founded sometime in the 16th century by Patyringomie, chief of the Mossi people, an ethnic group that originated in the Loumbila area of central Burkina Faso. The royal court was initially added to Burkina Faso's Tentative World Heritage List on January 24, 2012, the same year it was added to the World Monuments Watch, and it finally proclaimed a World Heritage Site on July 26, 2024, during the 46th World Heritage Committee which was hosted in New Delhi, India.

== Gallery ==
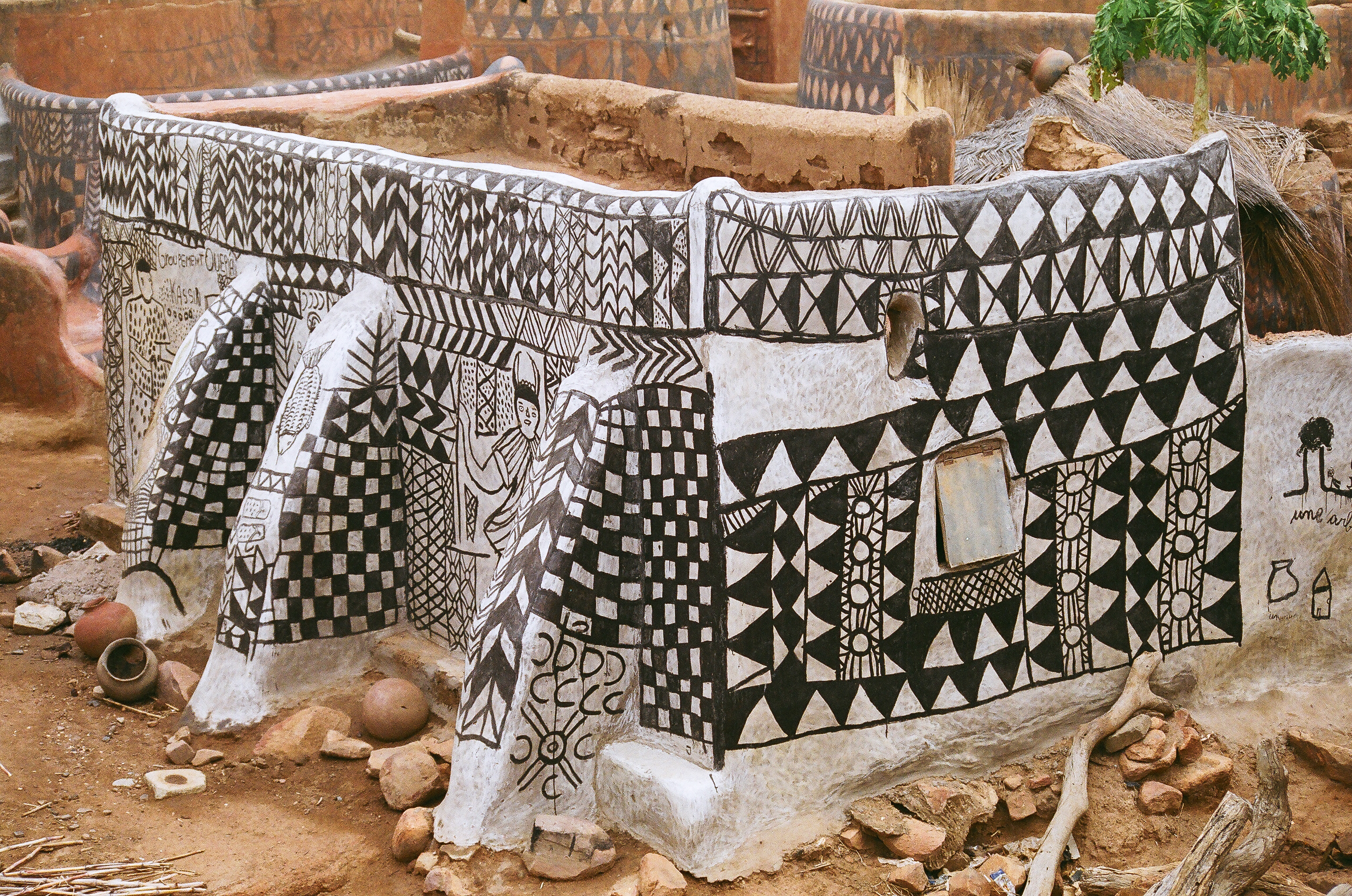

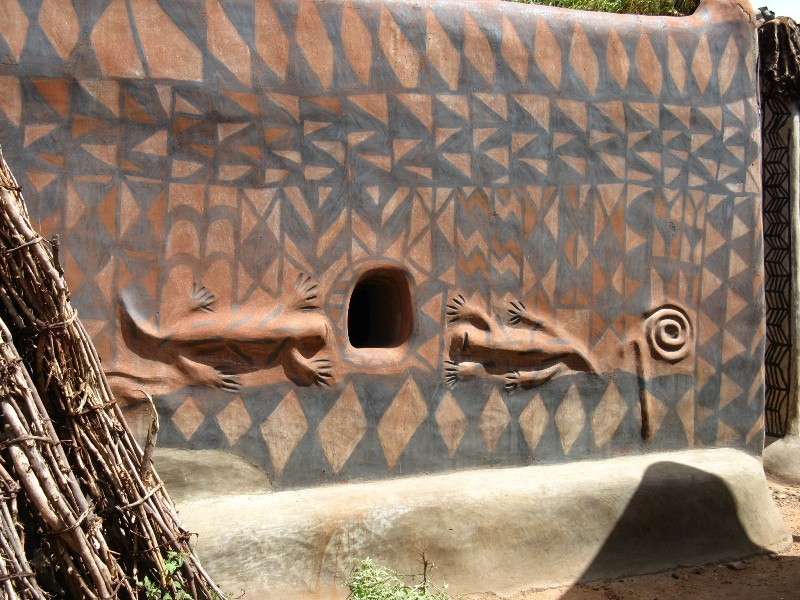

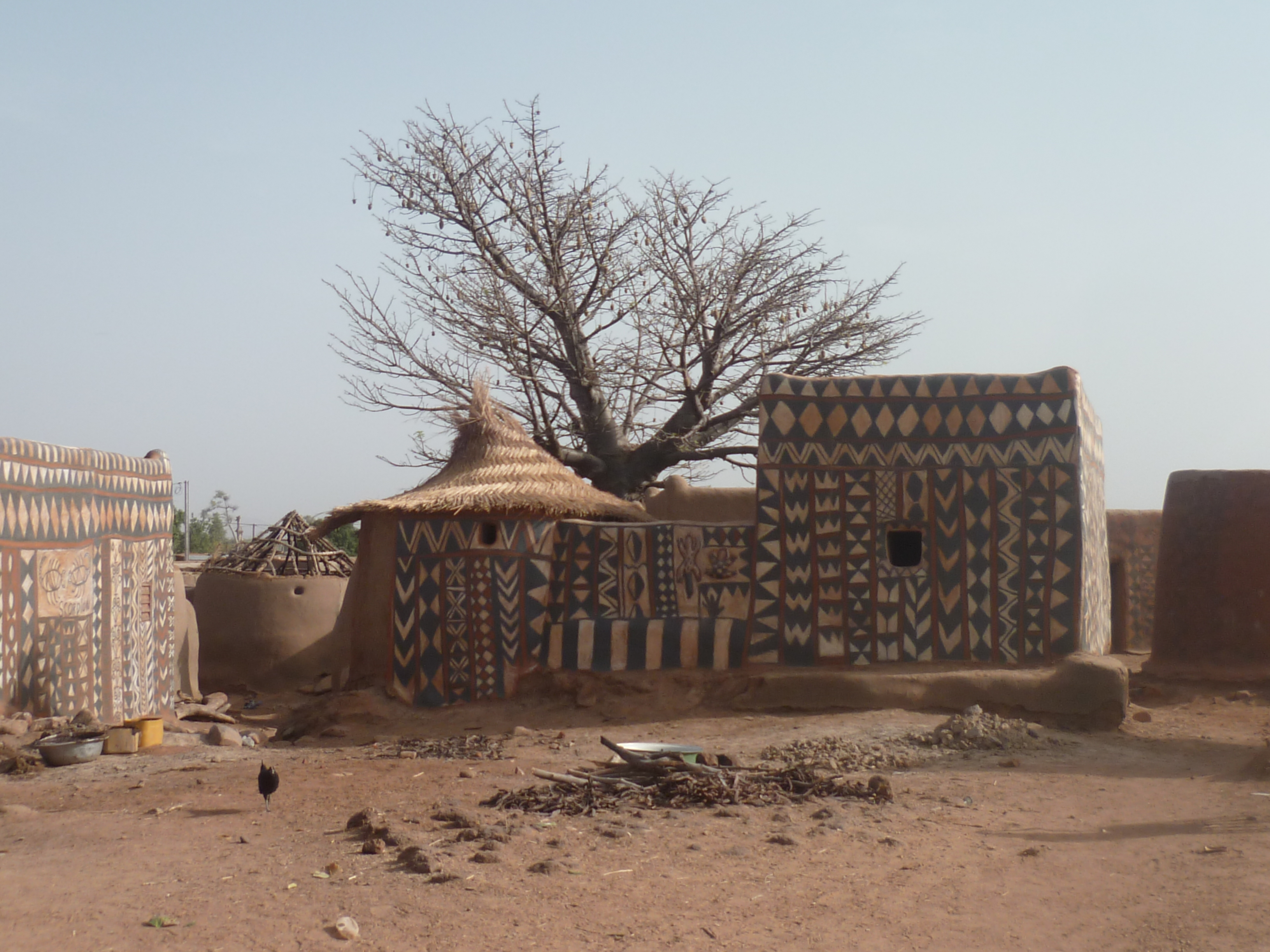

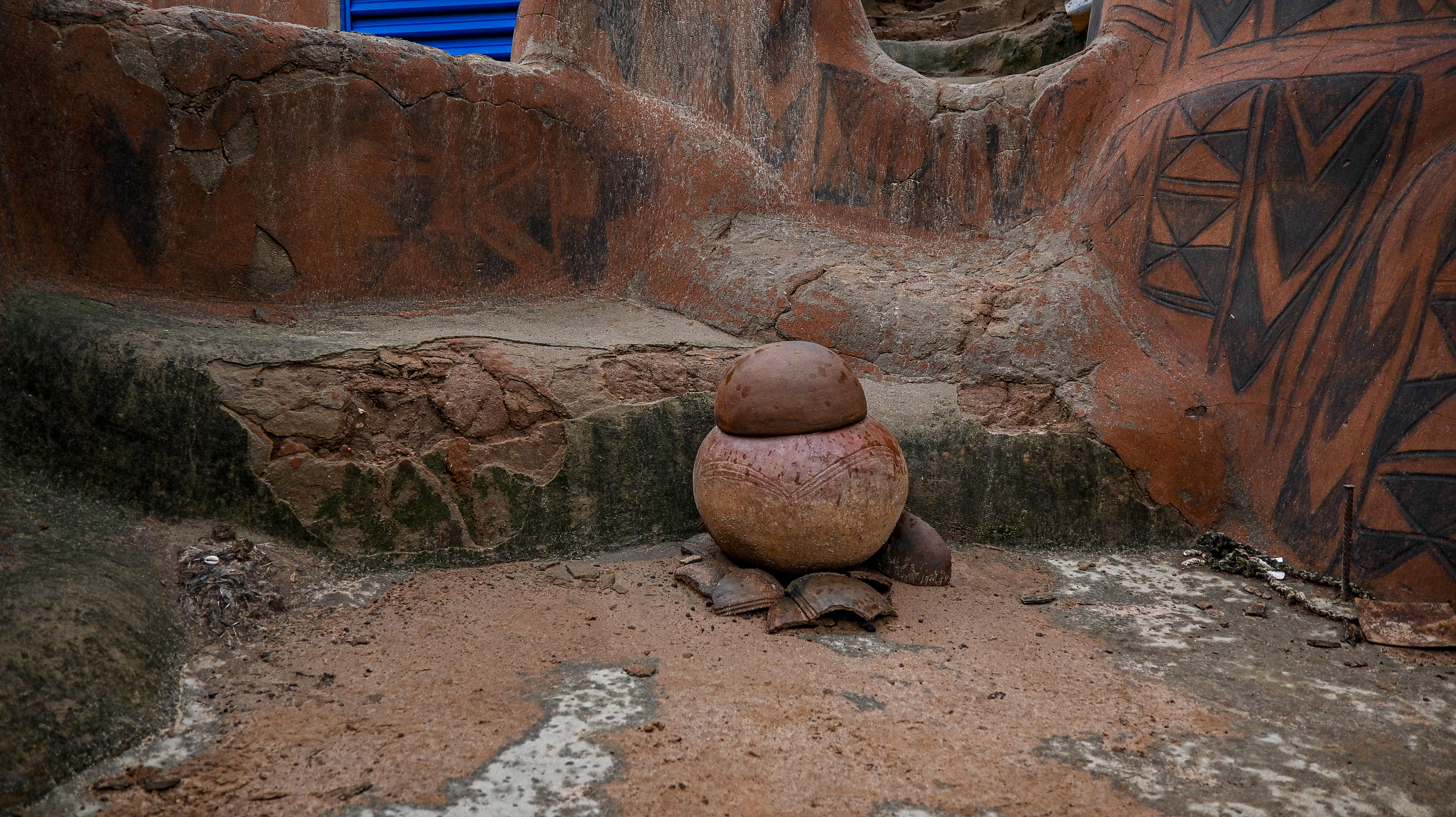

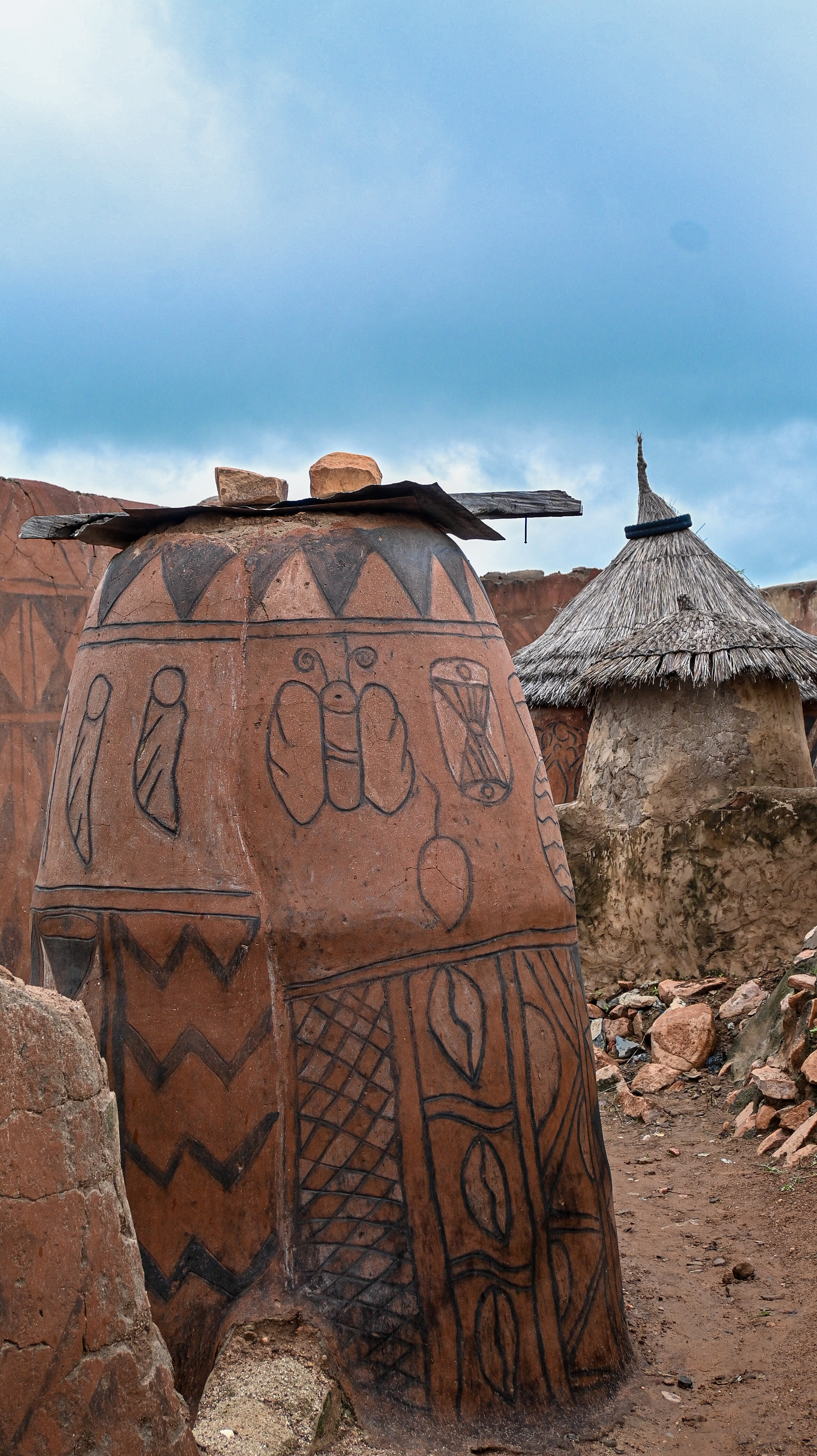

== See also ==
- List of World Heritage Sites in Burkina Faso
