= Pô Department =

Pô Department or Po Department may refer to:

- Pô Department, a department (département in French) and commune of Nahouri Province, in Centre-Sud Region of Burkina Faso.
- Pô (department), a former department (département in French) during the First French Republic and the First French Empire, in present-day Italy.
