= Ziou Department =

Coordinates: 11°02′10″N 0°46′45″W

Ziou
- Department
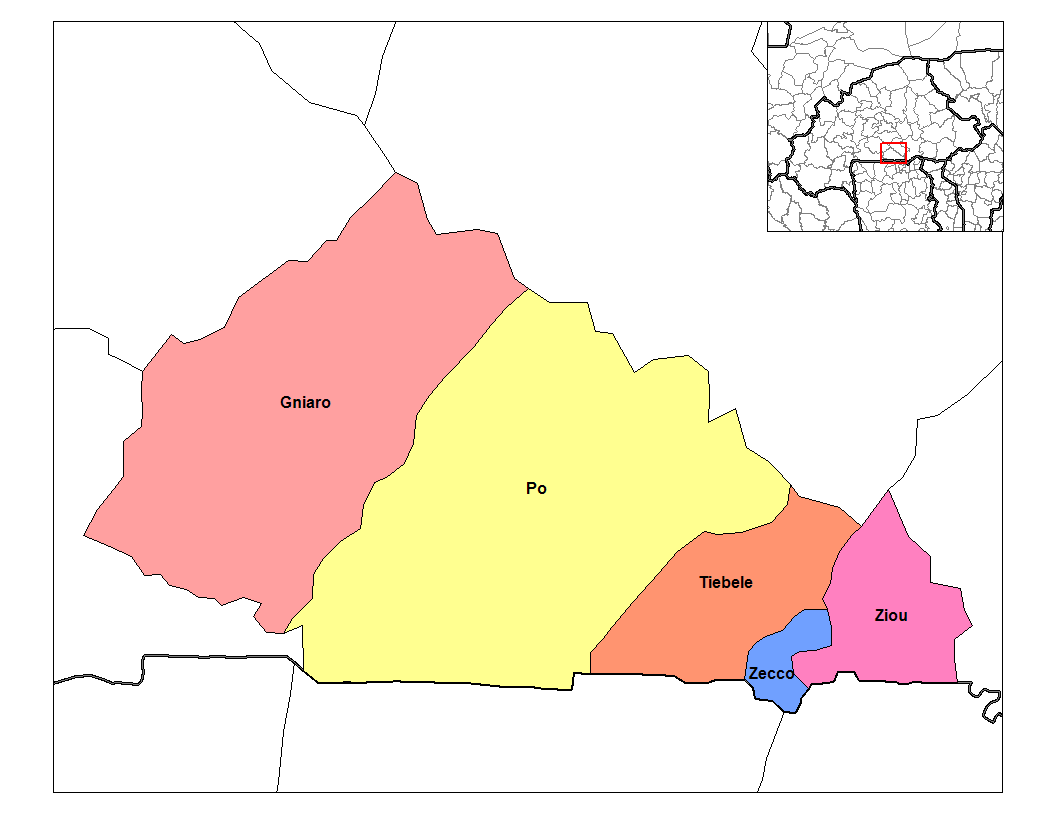
- Ziou Department location in the province
- Country: Burkina Faso
- Province: Nahouri Province

Area
  - Total: 102.8 sq mi (266.2 km^{2})

Population
  - Total: 27,529
  - Density: 267.8/sq mi (103.4/km^{2})
- Time zone: UTC+0 (GMT 0)

Ziou is a department or commune of Nahouri Province in southeastern Burkina Faso bordering Togo. Its capital lies at the town of Ziou.
