= Guiaro Department =

Coordinates: 11°22′08″N 1°22′38″W

Guiaro
- Department
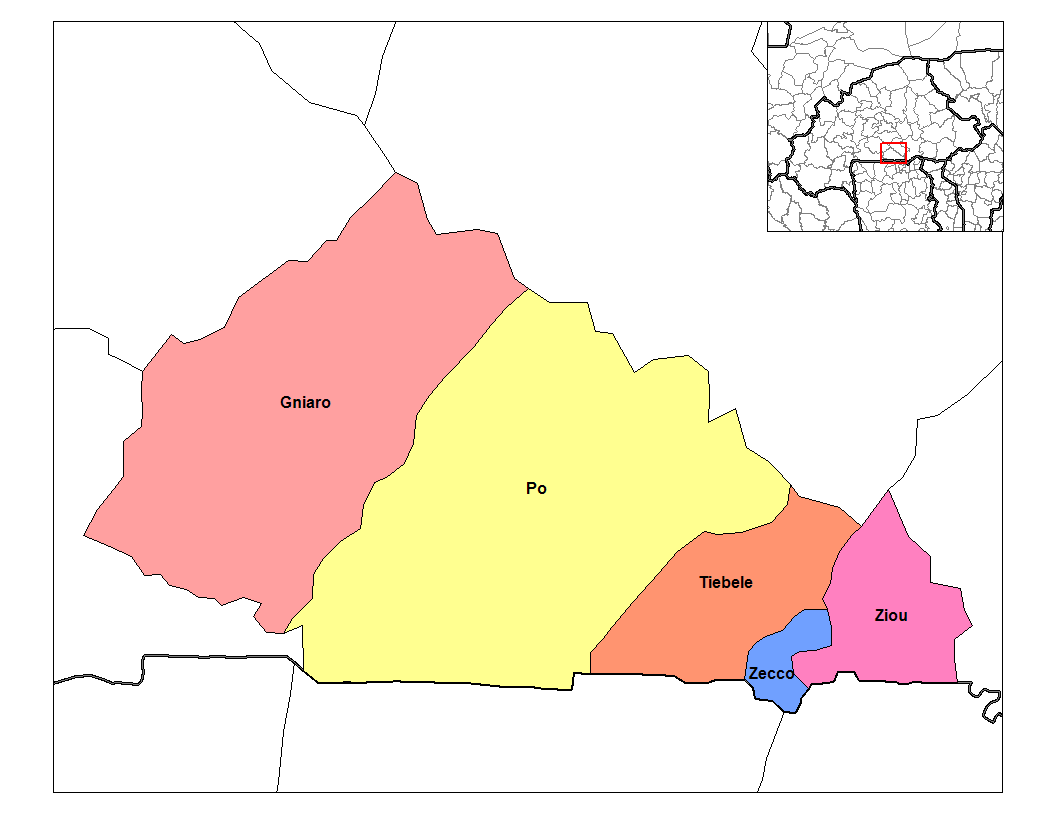
- Guiaro Department location in the province
- Country: Burkina Faso
- Province: Nahouri Province
- Time zone: UTC+0 (GMT 0)

Guiaro is a department or commune of Nahouri Province in southeastern Burkina Faso. Its capital is the town of Guiaro.
