= Way On Cemetery =

Chinese (Feng Shui) cemetery in Panama City, Panama

Coordinates: 8°57′12″N 79°32′46″W

- Interactive map of Way On Cemetery

Details
- Established: 1911
- Location: Panama City
- Country: Panama
- Style: Feng Shui
- Owned by: State

Way On Cemetery is a burial place in Panama City for the country's Chinese community, many of whose ancestors immigrated during the construction of the Panama Railroad in the mid-nineteenth century. The plot was purchased in 1882 by the Sociedad Way On and designed in accordance with feng shui and numerology traditions. Construction began the next year, and the first interment was in 1911. In 1942, due to a shortage of burial places in the city, half of the property was forcibly leased by the government, but it was returned to the Chinese community in 2002. Today, traditional Tomb Sweeping ceremonies are held annually and funeral ceremonies are performed regularly.

Despite its stone wall enclosures and towering entrance gate, Way On has suffered from vandalism in recent years, and faces ongoing threats due to development pressures and lack of site maintenance. The site was included on the 2012 World Monuments Watch and is classified as "Rescue Needed" by Global Heritage Network.
