= Zecco Department =

Coordinates: 11°02′N 0°51′W

Zecco
- Department
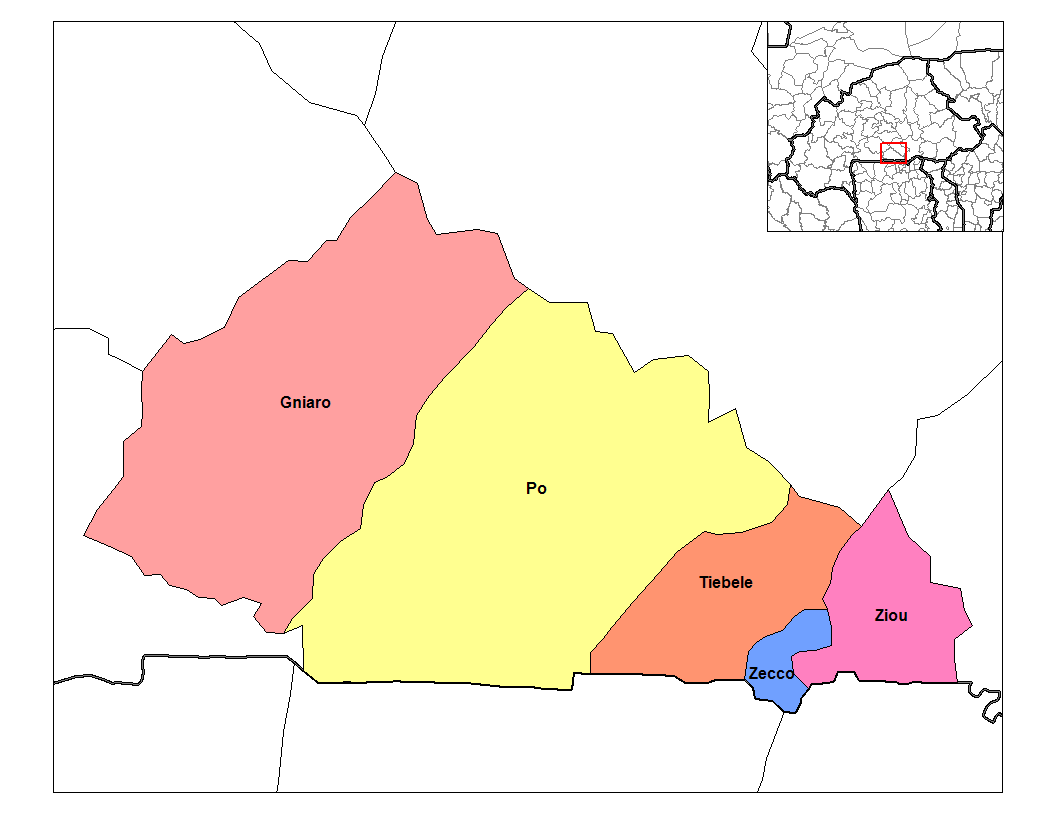
- Zecco Department location in the province
- Country: Burkina Faso
- Province: Nahouri Province

Area
  - Total: 18.35 sq mi (47.52 km^{2})

Population (2019 census)
  - Total: 13,440
  - Density: 732.5/sq mi (282.8/km^{2})
- Time zone: UTC+0 (GMT 0)

Zecco is a department or commune of Nahouri Province in south-eastern Burkina Faso. It comes from the Frafra name Zẽkɔ
