= Kasena language =

Gur language spoken in West Africa

Kasena
- kasɩm
- Region: Ghana, Burkina Faso
- Ethnicity: Kassena
- Native speakers: (250,000 cited 1998–2004)
- Language family: Niger–Congo?: Atlantic–Congo; Gur; Southern; Gurunsi; Northern; Kasena
- Writing system: Latin, Goulsse

Language codes
- ISO 639-3: xsm
- Glottolog: kase1253
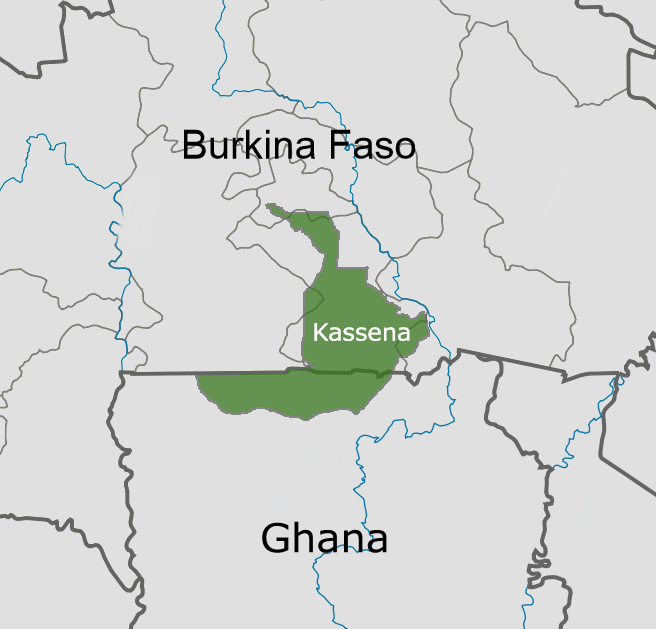
- The region in which the Kassena people live in Ghana and Burkina Faso

Kasena or Kassena (Kasem or Kassem) is the language of the Kassena ethnic group and is a Gur language spoken in the Upper East Region of northern Ghana and in Burkina Faso.

== Phonology ==
=== Consonants ===
		Bilabial	Labio dental	Alveolar	Post-alveolar	Palatal	Velar	Glottal
Plosive	voiceless	p		t			k	
Plosive	voiced	b		d			ɡ	
Nasal		m		n		ɲ	ŋ	
Affricate	voiceless				t̠͡ʃ			
Affricate	voiced				d̠͡ʒ			
Fricative	voiceless		f	s				h
Fricative	voiced		v	z				
Approximant				l		j	w	
Trill				r				

=== Vowels ===
	Front	Central	Back
Close	i		u
Near-close	ɪ		ʊ
Close-mid	e	ə	o
Open-mid	ɛ	ə	ɔ
Open		a	

=== Tone ===
Kasena has three tones, a high tone, a mid level tone and a low tone. Tonal changes either change the lexical meaning of a word or its grammatical function.

Lexical

A
„I“

Á
„You (PL)“

Grammatical

Wu
Negation

Wú
Futur

== Grammar ==
=== Noun class system ===
There are five classes of nouns that can be identified in Kasena. These classes correspond to grammatical genders and are differentiated in terms of number, such that there are five classes for singular nouns and five classes for plural nouns.

Gender	SG	PL	Gloss
1	bu	biə	child/children
2	bɪnɪ	bɪna	year(s)
3	naga	nɛ	foot/feet
4	piu	pweeru	montain(s)
5	bʊŋʊ	bʊm	goat(s)

=== Pronouns ===
==== Personal and possessive pronouns ====
There are two classes of personal pronouns. One class is referring to humans, whereas the other class is referring to non-human entities. The personal pronouns are also used as possessive pronouns, thus there is no special form for possessive pronouns in Kasena.

Human personal pronouns

Person	SG	PL	Gloss
1st	A	Dí	I/we
2nd	N	Á	You/you
3rd	O	Ba	He/she/They

Non-human personal pronouns

Class	SG	PL
I	O	Ba
II	Dɪ	Ya
III	Ka	Sɪ
IV	Kʊ	Tɪ
V	Kʊ	Dɪ

==== Emphatic pronouns ====
Person	SG	PL	Gloss
1st	amʊ	dcbam	Me/we
2nd	nmʊ	abam	You/you
3rd	wʊm/wʊntu	bam/bantʊ	He/she/they

==== Reciprocal pronouns ====
Reciprocity is expressed by the pronoun daanɪ, which sometimes occurs as a prefix or suffix.

Ba soe daanɪ.
3PL like each.other
„They like each other.“

==== Reflexive pronouns ====
Reflexivity is expressed by a personal pronoun to which either tɪtɪ or katɪ ('-self')is added.

O cɔgɪ o tɪtɪ.
3SG destroy 3SG self
„He destroys himself.“

==== Relative pronouns ====
Relative pronouns are formed on the basis of the personal pronouns for non-human entities to which the suffix -lʊ is attached.

Class	SG	PL
I	wʊlʊ	balʊ
II	dɪlʊ	yalʊ
III	kalʊ	sɪlʊ
IV	kʊlʊ	tɪlʊ
V	kʊlʊ	dɪlʊ

==== Indefinite pronouns ====
Class	Number	Certain	Some	Any
I	SG	wʊdoŋ	---	wʊlʊ wʊlʊ
I	PL	badonnə	badaara	balʊ balʊ
II	SG	dɪ doŋ	---	dɪlʊ dɪlʊ
II	PL	yadonnə	yadaara	yalʊ yalʊ
III	SG	kadoŋ	---	kalʊ kalʊ
III	PL	sɪdonnə	sɪdaara	sɪlʊ sɪlʊ
IV	SG	kudoŋ	---	kʊlʊ kʊlʊ
IV	PL	tɪdonnə	tɪdaara	tɪlʊ tɪlʊ
V	SG	kudoŋ	---	kʊlʊ kʊlʊ
V	PL	dɪdonnə	dɪdaara	dɪlʊ dɪlʊ

==== Demonstrative pronouns ====
Class	SG	Gloss	PL	Gloss
I	wuntu	this/that	bantu	these/those
II	dɪntu	this/that	yantu	these/those
III	kantu	this/that	sɪntu	these/those
IV	kuntu	this/that	tɪntu	these/those
V	kuntu	this/that	dɪntu	these/those

==== Interrogative pronouns ====
Class	SG who, what, which	PL who, what, which	How much
I	wɔɔ	bra	bagra
II	dɔɔ	yɔɔ	yagra
III	kɔɔ	sɔɔ	sɪgra
IV	kɔɔ	tɔɔ	tɪgra
V	kɔɔ	dɔɔ	dɪgra

== Syntax ==
=== Word order ===
The Kasena language has a basic SVO word order.

Ada diim toŋe.
Ada yesterday work.PFV
„Ada worked yesterday.“
