= Tiébélé Department =

Coordinates: 11°06′N 0°57′W

Tiébélé Tible (Mossi)
- Department
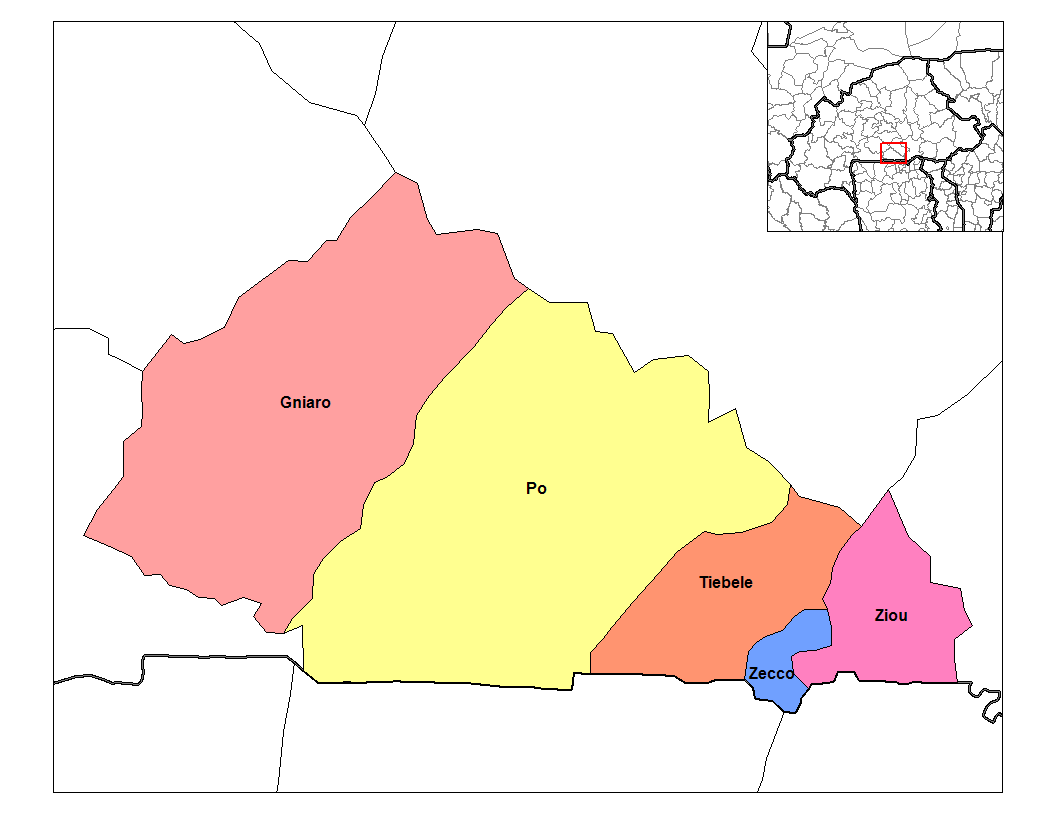
- Tiébélé Department location in the province
- Country: Burkina Faso
- Province: Nahouri Province

Area
  - Total: 146.4 sq mi (379.3 km^{2})

Population (2019 census)
  - Total: 61,007
  - Density: 416.6/sq mi (160.8/km^{2})
- Time zone: UTC+0 (GMT 0)

Tiébélé (Mossi: Tible) is a department or commune of Nahouri Province in southeastern Burkina Faso. Its capital lies at the town of Tiébélé; the chief, the royal court and the nobility of the Kassena people, who first settled the region in the 15th century, reside there. Located at the foot of a hill in a lowland landscape, the Royal Court of Tiébélé forms an irregular circular space of approximately 1.2 hectares. Several characteristic elements can be distinguished: a sacred hill, an altar of the ancestor and the red fig tree. The courtyard is characterized by a rich traditional architecture of a defensive character. It is surrounded by high perimeter walls connected by residential walls.
