= Nahouri Province =

Coordinates: 11°15′N 1°15′W

Nahouri Nawuri (Mossi)
- Province
- Location in Burkina Faso

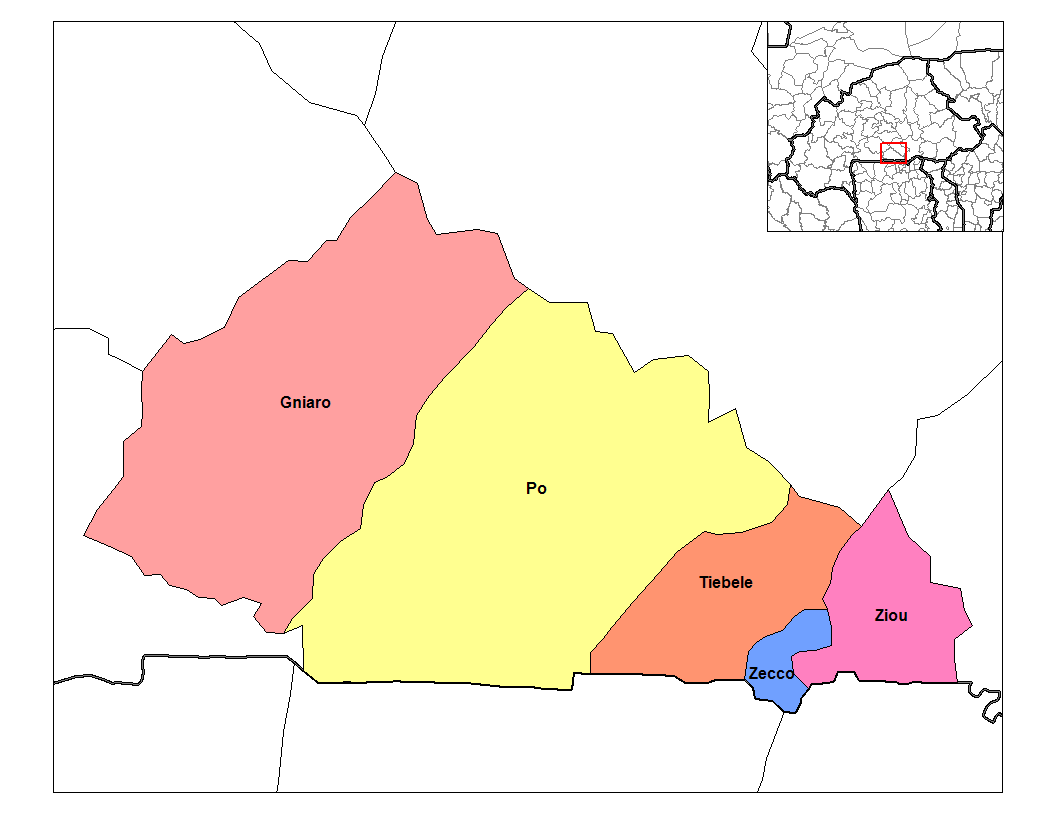
- Provincial map of its departments
- Country: Burkina Faso
- Region: Centre-Sud Region
- Capital: Pô

Area
  - Province: 3,748 km^{2} (1,447 sq mi)

Population (2019 census)
  - Province: 195,608
  - Density: 52.19/km^{2} (135.2/sq mi)
  - Urban: 28,079
- Time zone: UTC+0 (GMT 0)

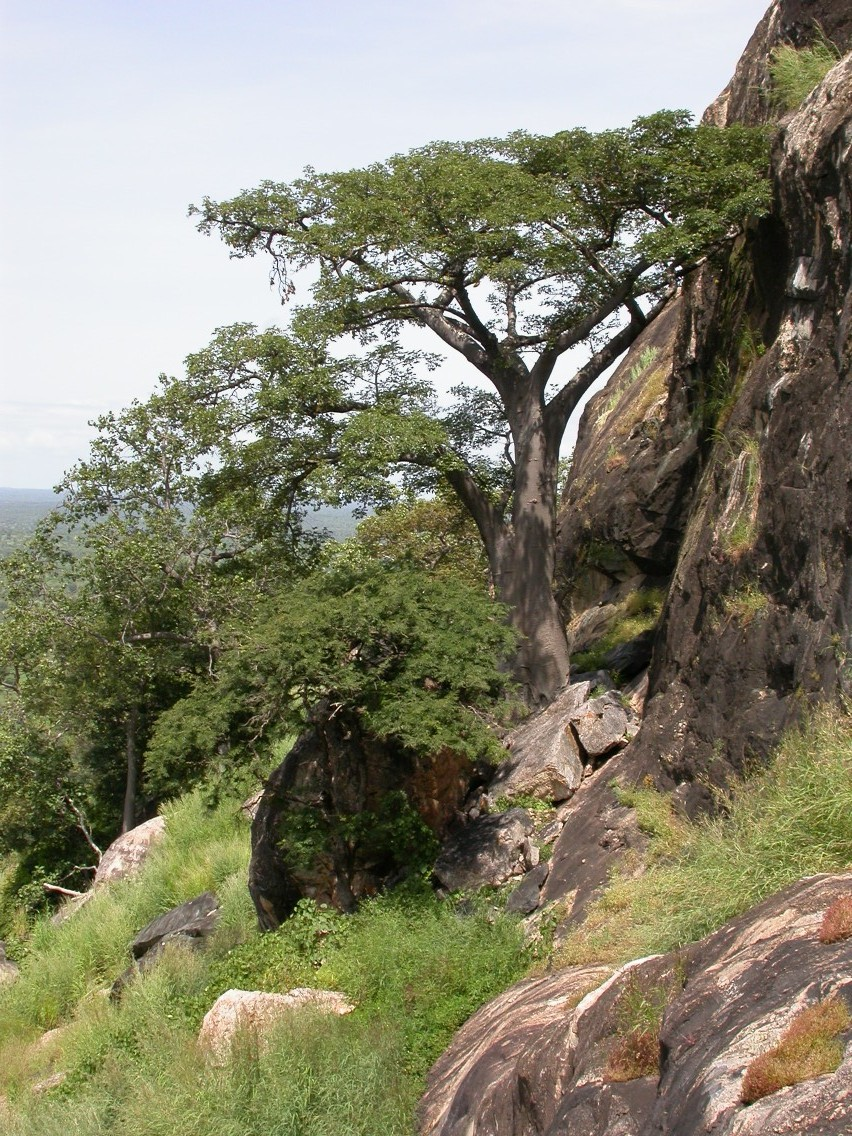
Vegetation at the Inselberg Pic de Nahouri

Nahouri (Mossi: Nawuri) is one of the 45 provinces of Burkina Faso, located in the Centre-Sud administrative region. In 2019 the population was 195,608. Its capital is Pô.

== Education ==
In 2011 the province had 109 primary schools and 20 secondary schools.

== Healthcare ==
In 2011 the province had 19 health and social promotion centers (Centres de santé et de promotion sociale), 3 doctors and 67 nurses.

== Departments ==
The Departments of Nahouri
Commune	Capital	Population Census 2006)
Guiaro Department	Guiaro	19,733
Pô Department	Pô	50,360
Tiébélé Department	Tiébélé	54,104
Zecco Department	Zecco	9,340
Ziou Department	Ziou	21,926
