= Gurunsi people =

Ethnic group in Burkina Faso and Ghana

Regions with significant populations
- Primarily native to Kingdom of Dagbon northern Ghana and southern Burkina Faso. Diaspora present in United States, United Kingdom, France, Germany etc.
- Burkina Faso: 3,500,000
- Ghana: 1,200,000
- Ivory Coast: 270,000

Languages
- Gurunsi languages, Hausa language, English, French

Religion
- Sunni Islam, Christianity, Animism

The Gurunsi, or Grunshi, are a set of related ethnic groups inhabiting northern Ghana and south and central Burkina Faso.

== Pre-colonial history and origins ==
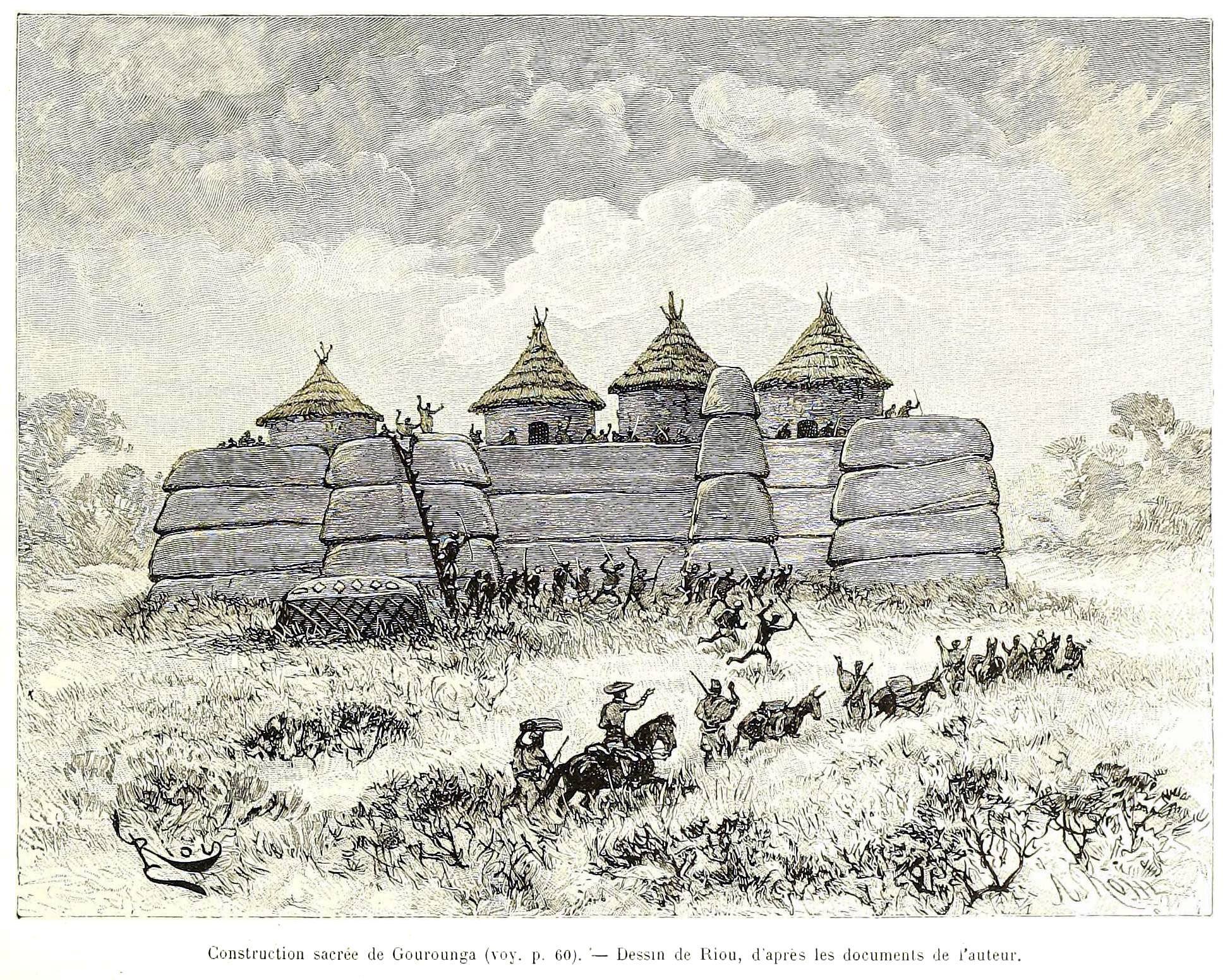
Gourounga, Gurunsi sacred building, late 19th century

Oral traditions of the Gurunsi hold that they originated from the western Sudan passing through the Sahel. While it is unknown when the migration occurred, it is believed that the Gurunsi were present in their current location by 1100 AD. Following the 15th century, when the Mossi states were established to the north, Mossi horsemen often raided Gurunsi areas for slaves, but the Gurunsi peoples were never fully subjugated, remaining independent.

According to doctor Salif Titamba Lankoande, in Noms de famille (Patronymes) au Burkina Faso, the name Gurunsi comes from the Djerma language of Niger words “Guru-si”, which means “iron does not penetrate”. It is said that during the Djerma invasions of Gurunsi lands in the late 19th century, a Djerma jihadist leader by the name of Baba Ato Zato (better known by the Hausa corruption of his name: Babatu) recruited a battalion of indigenous men for his army, who after having consumed traditional medicines, were said to be invulnerable to iron. They set up the Zabarima Emirate within Gurunsiland, which makes up far northern Ghana and southern Burkina Faso.

== Partition ==
The people who speak closely related Gur languages and dialects and classed by the Mossi under the umbrella term Gurunsi form an arc of village communities mostly organised as defensive strongholds from the Koudougou residency west and northwest of Ouagadougou in colonial times to the northeast of current day Ghana. Historically, these groups were subjects of the Mossi kingdoms. This area became in the late 1890s part of a three-way competition between the colonial forces of the French, the British, and the Germans, trying to subdue Djerma warlords and fight also the warlike local population who resisted fiercely to maintain its autonomy, while vying to occupy as much territory as possible at the expense of rival colonial powers. Each of the three claimed part of the territory occupied by the Gurunsi villages, but the competition between the colonial powers was not resolved until the last year of the 19th century. After establishing the protectorates of Yatenga (1895) and Ouagadougou (1896), the French annexed Gurunsi lands in 1897. Eventually the Germans withdrew to Togoland (modern Ghana & Togo), and an 1898 Anglo-French agreement officially established the boundary with the Gold Coast (now Ghana). This partition divided Gurunsi peoples among French and British administrative systems, facilitating the political and cultural divergence of sub-groups on each side of the boundary.

== Gurunsi ethnic groups ==
The term Gurunsi is used as a meta term to refer to a group of very loosely related peoples. The ethnic groups classified as Gurunsi do not share a common language and have distinct cultural practices. Some of the largest Gurunsi ethnic groups are the Frafra, Nabt and Talensi in Ghana as well as the Ko, Lyele, Nuna, and Sisaala in Burkina Faso. The sub-groups Kassena and Nankani inhabit both Ghana and Burkina Faso.

== Art and architecture ==
The Kassena people are known for their clay houses, which are built by the men. The women decorate the exteriors of the houses with geometric patterns.

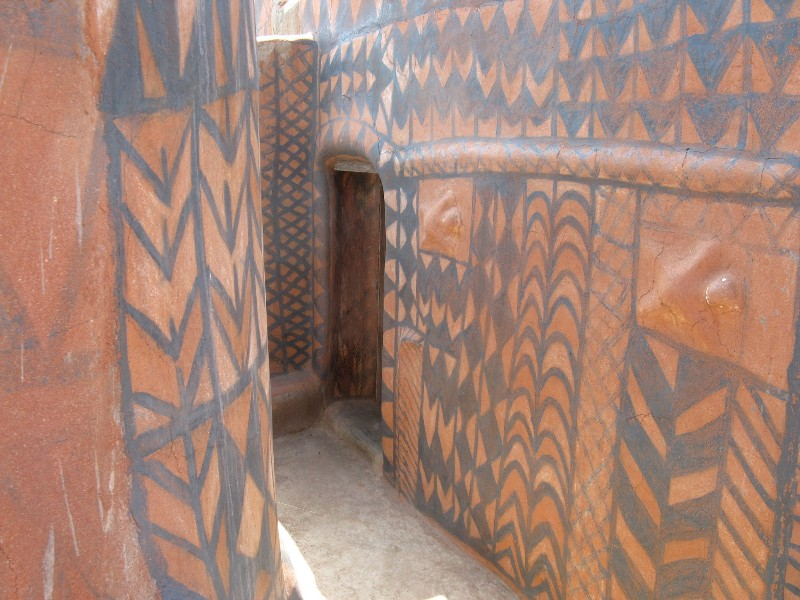

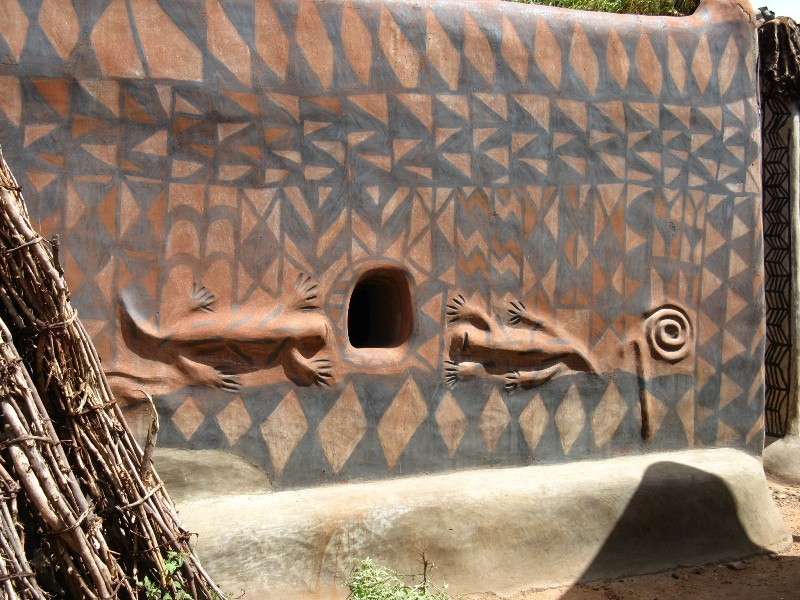

== Bibliography ==
- Bayili, Blaise. Religion, droit et pouvoir au Burkina Faso. Les Lyele du Burkina Faso. Paris: L'Harmattan, 1998.
- Duperray, Anne M. Les Gourounsi de Haute Volta. Conquête et colonisation, 1896-1933. Stuttgart: Steiner, 1984.
- Jacob, Jean-Pierre. Le sens des limites: maladie, sorcellerie, religion et pouvoir chez les Winye, Gourounsi du Burkina Faso. Neuchâtel: Faculté des lettres [Thèse de doctorat], 1988.
- Levtzion, Nehemia. Muslims and Chiefs in West Africa. Oxford: Clarendon Press, 1968.
- Tauxier, Louis. Le noir du Soudan, pays mossi et gourounsi. Paris: Emile Larose, 1912.
- Tauxier, Louis. Nouvelles notes sur le Mossi et le Gourounsi. Paris: Emile Larose, 1924.
