= Pô Department (Burkina Faso) =

Coordinates: 11.3689°N 1.3772°W

Pô
- Department
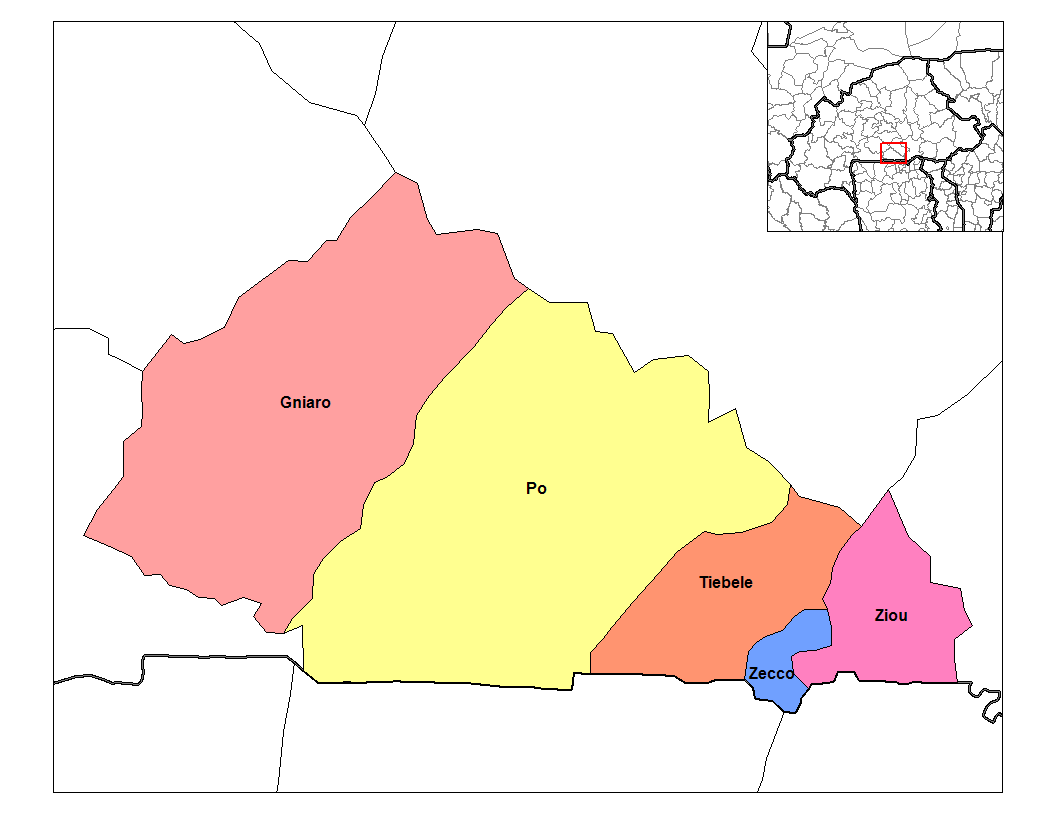
- Pô Department location in the province
- Country: Burkina Faso
- Province: Nahouri Province

Area
  - Department: 616 sq mi (1,595 km^{2})

Population (2019 census)
  - Department: 64,426
  - Density: 104.6/sq mi (40.39/km^{2})
  - Urban: 28,079
- Time zone: UTC+0 (GMT 0)

Pô is a department or commune of Nahouri Province in southern Burkina Faso. Its capital is the city of Pô.
