= Kassena =

Ethnic group in Ghana

Kassena
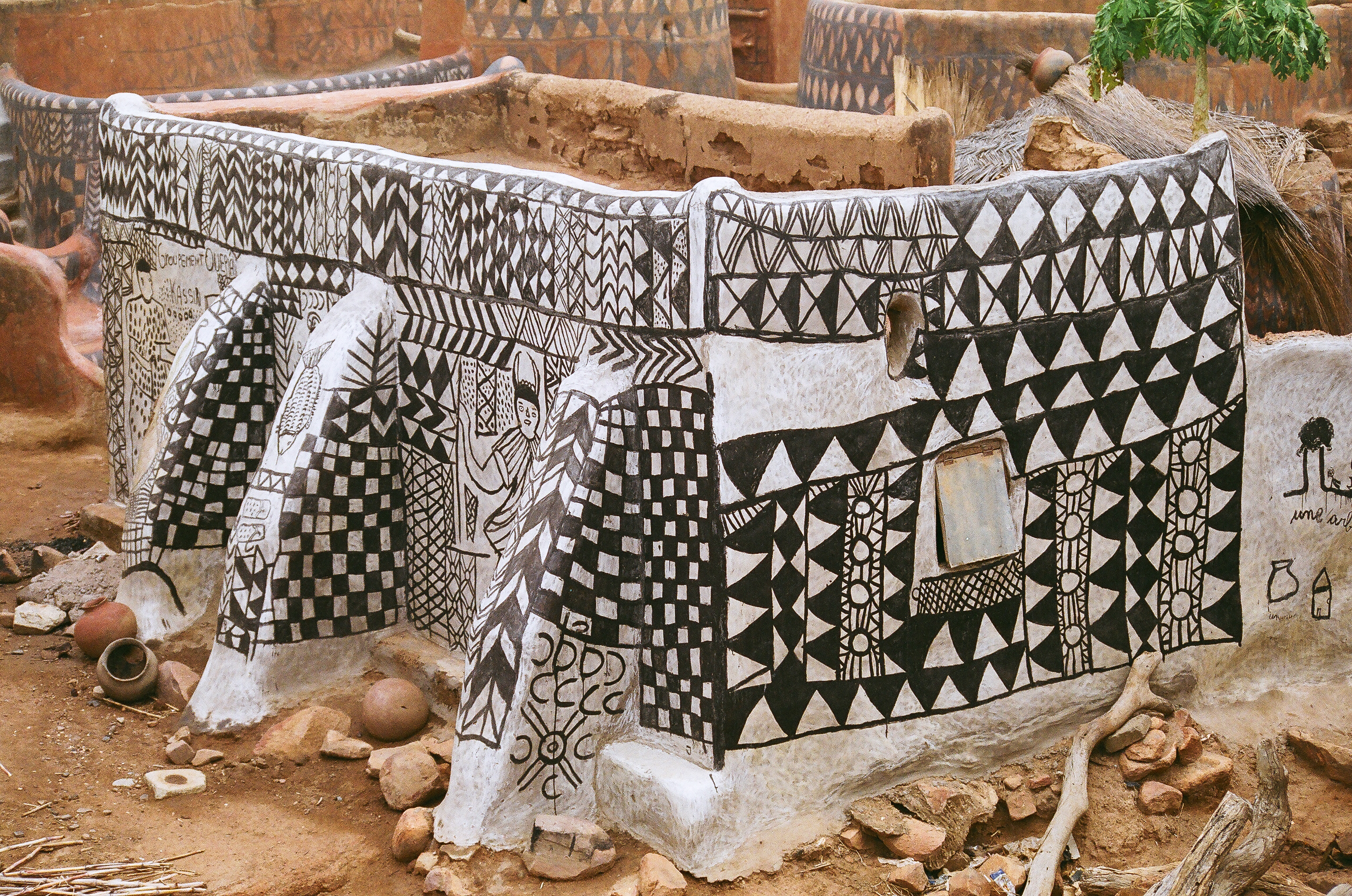

Regions with significant populations
- Kingdom of Dagbon, Ghana and Burkina Faso

Languages
- Kasem, French, English

Religion
- Kassena Religion Islam and Christianity

Related ethnic groups
- Other Gurunsi Peoples

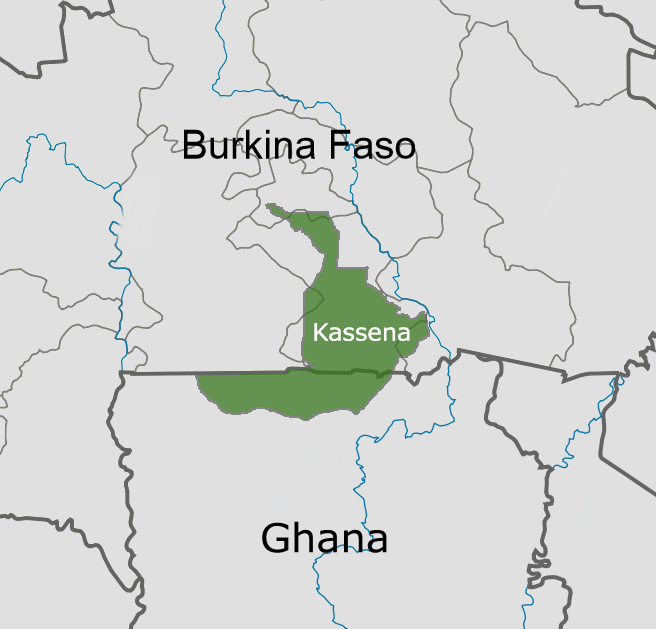
A map of the region in which the Kassena people live, in both Ghana en Burkina Faso

The Kassena people are an ethnic group located along the northern Ghana and Burkina Faso border. They speak the Kasem language. Their king lives in the town of Tiébélé. The Kasenna are closely related to the people of Nankanni and were brought together to form the Kassena-Nankana administrative district in 1936. As of 2008, the (Kassena-Nankana) area comprises two districts: Kassena Nankana West and Kassena Nankana East.

== History ==
The Kassena people are a subset of the Gurunsi meta ethnicity, a term used to describe a set of ethnic groups inhabiting northern Ghana and southern Burkina Faso, as well as Togo. The Gurunsi people are not actually closely related to each other and their classification as Gurunsi comes from a term used by a Djerma jihadist leader by the name of Baba Ato Zato to describe a group of soldiers recruited from multiple different ethnic groups within the same region. According to doctor Salif Titamba Lankoande, in Noms de famille (Patronymes) au Burkina Faso, the name Gurunsi comes from the Djerma language of Niger words “Guru-si”, which means “iron does not penetrate”. It is said that during the Djerma invasions of Gurunsi lands in the late 19th century, a Baba Ato Zato (better known by the Hausa corruption of his name: Babatu) recruited a battalion of indigenous men for his army, who after having consumed traditional medicines, were said to be invulnerable to iron. The term has stuck since then to refer to these people, but they are completely separate culturally and linguistically distinct ethnic groups.

The Kassena people form an arc of towns mostly organized as defensive strongholds from Ouagadougou to northeast Ghana. Historically, these towns were subjects of the Mossi Empire This area became in the late 1890s part of a three-way competition between the colonial forces of the French, the British, and the Germans, trying to subdue Djerma warlords and fight also the warlike local population who resisted fiercely to maintain its autonomy, while vying to occupy as much territory as possible at the expense of rival colonial powers. Each of the three claimed part of the territory occupied by the Kassena, but the competition between the colonial powers was not resolved until the last year of the 19th century. After establishing the protectorates of Yatenga (1895) and Ouagadougou (1896), the French annexed Kassena lands in 1897. Eventually the Germans withdrew to Togoland (modern Ghana & Togo), and an 1898 Anglo-French agreement officially established the boundary with the Gold Coast (now Ghana). This partition divided the Kassena peoples among French and British administrative systems, with some Kassenas living in southern Burkina Faso, notably in the Naouhri province and the cities of Tiebele and Pô, and some living in Ghana notably in the Kassena-Nankana administrative district, Navrongo, and in the city of Paga.

== Religious beliefs ==
The Kassena are historically a monotheistic animist people worshipping the Creator God "We" and venerating the ancestors. It is this same syllable "We" that can be found in many Kassena names such as "Webedouh", "Wettelne", and, "Wepouli." In traditional Kassena society the deceased are buried inside their family's ancestral courtyard.

== Political systems ==
The traditional ruler in a Kassena town is called a "Peh." Each town has its own town "Peh" with the most powerful ruler being the Tiébélé Peh.

== Art ==
The Kassena people are known for their wooden masks, clay sculptures, and wooden jewelry, as well as their music. The Djongon is the name of the traditional Kassena dance festival where gatherers dance the Djongo or nagila dance.

== Society ==
Traditional Kassena society is grouped into chiefdoms, six of whom are predominant: Navrongo, Paga, Chiana, Kayoro, Katiu and Nakon.

== Home call ==
The Belgian anthropologist, Ann Cassiman, conducted detailed ethnographic accounts of the Kassena. In her book “Stirring Life: Women's Paths and Places Among the Kasena of Northern Ghana”, she elaborates on the material culture, rituals and social practices as experienced in a rural Kassena village. This research also led to a museum exhibition entitled 'Home Call', housed by the Museum Aan de Stroom (MAS) in Antwerp, Belgium.
