= Agrumatue =

River in Ghana

Location
- Country: Ghana
- Region: Upper East Region
- District: Bolgatanga Municipal District, Bolgatanga East District, Bongo District

Physical characteristics
- Mouth: Atamore
  - location: Lake Volta
  - coordinates: 10°37′01″N 0°56′39″W
  - elevation: 140 m
- Discharge
  - location: Mouth

Basin features
- River system: Volta
- Tributaries
  - left: Ayia

Agrumatue is a river in the Upper East Region, Ghana. It flows between the cities Bolgatanga and Zuarungu and is also the border between the Bolgatanga Municipal District and the Bolgatanga East District. The river is crossed by N11 road.

During the dry season the river is dry. However near Bolgatanga there is a dam which holds back some water. Due to this dam agricultural activities are even possible during the dry season.
