= Kusebko Larere Festival =

Festival in Ghana by the people of Sumbrungu

Kusebko Larere Festival is an annual festival celebrated by the chiefs and people of Sumbrungu in the Bolgatanga District in the Upper East Region of Ghana. It is usually celebrated in the month of January.

== Celebrations ==
During the festival, visitors are welcomed to share food and drinks. The people put on traditional clothes and there is durbar of chiefs, as well as dancing and drumming.

== Significance ==
This festival is celebrated to mark an event that took place in the past.
