= Pobaga =

Village in Upper East Region, Ghana

Pobaga is a small village in the Bolgatanga Municipal District. Pobaga is located in the regional capital, Upper East Region. The Intercity STC Bus Station in Bolgatanga is located in Pobaga. Other villages near Pobaga are Damweo, Tindonmolgo and Gambibgo. The nearest villages are Tindonmolgo and Damweo. The name Pobaga is accredit to a deity or god called Apobaga, reverenced by the people of Tindonmolgo. The people of Pobaga are (Gurunsi) Frafra people. The Pobaga community is blessed with a high school (Zamsetech Senior high school) and several basic schools.

== History ==
The people of Pobaga migrated from Sokabisi to their present location. During their migration from Sokabisi to settle at Gambibgo, the last settlement of their great grand Ancestor "Agongo", they passed through the lands of Tindonmolgo. The Land chief (Tindaana) of Tindonmolgo requested that, they should take the whole portion of land to settle and farm on it at the outstretch of Tindonmolgo closer to the deity called Apobaga hence the name Pobaga community. The people of Pobaga were known as sons (children) of Akogesah, at the time they were living in Sokabisi. Akogesah is a great progeny of Agongo. The people of Pobaga migrated from the Sokabisi due to space and land for farming. The people of Pobaga are well known for mastery in archery and hunting. Their great grand ancestor "Agongo" who had a lot of descendants and lineage in several villages is still worshipped as a sacred deity.

Oral history has it that their ancestor "Agongo" migrated from Zecco a place in Nahouri Province in Burkina Faso. Agongo begot Akogesah, her first progeny, at her first settlement and begot Asantinga and Agreggor at her last settlement, Gambibgo.

== Life in Pobaga ==
The people of Pobaga are mainly farmers, few are straw basket and smock weavers

== Tradition and culture ==
The people of Pobaga has a strong culture. The people of Pobaga has a local chief enskinned by The Paramount chief of Bolgatanga and a spiritual Head or leader which is chosen in consultation with the spirits of their ancestors through soothsayers and seers of the village and other villages. The chosen one is usually the elders in the village. The following villages shares and a common ancestry and lineage with the people of Pobaga. Their traditions therefore forbid them to marry from these villages.

- Gambibgo
- Sokabisi
- Tanzui
- Kumbangre

The people of Pobaga celebrate two festivals every year, the kuure festival and the Adaakuya festival, which is also celebrated by all the villages in Bolgatanga.

== Sights of Pobaga ==
- The Ancestral shrine
- The baobab tree bees
- The Deity Apobaga Rocks
