= Adaakoya Festival =

Festival in Ghana by the Gurunsis in Bolgatanga

Adaakoya Festival is an annual harvest festival celebrated by the chiefs and people of Gurunsis in Bolgatanga and Zuarungu in the Upper East Region of Ghana. It is usually celebrated between the months of January and February.

== Celebrations ==
During the festival, there is a durbar of chiefs and their people. Sacrifices are offered to the gods. There is also drumming and dancing.

== Significance ==
The festival is celebrated to give thanks to the gods for a good harvest.
