= Daa Festival =

Festival in Ghana by the people of Talensi

Daa Festival is an annual festival celebrated by the chiefs and people of Talensi Traditional Area especially the Baare and Tong Nayiri communities near Bolgatanga in the Upper East Region of Ghana. It is usually celebrated in the month of October.

== Celebrations ==
During the festival, visitors are welcomed to share food and drinks. The people put on traditional clothes and there is durbar of chiefs. There is also Tampana dance and drum. There is a mode of dressing that depicts their traditional culture and how their ancestors migrated to their present abode.

== Significance ==
This festival is celebrated to mark the bumper harvest throughout the year and also to thank the gods for peace in the land.
