= Bolgatanga Girls Senior High School =

Bolgatanga Girls' Senior High School

Location
- Bolgatanga; Upper East Region; Bolgatanga; Ghana; 10.8068712°N 0.8707845°W

Information
- School type: GES, All Girls School
- Motto: Unity, Equality and Patriotism
- Established: 1956
- School district: Bolgatanga
- Oversight: Ministry of Education
- Gender: Girls
- Age: 13 to 20
- Average class size: 35
- Classes offered: Home Economics, Science, General Arts, Visual Arts, Business
- Hours in school day: 8½
- Classrooms: 39
- Houses: 7
- Colours: Red & White
- Nickname: Pogmenka
- Accreditation: GES/MoE
- School fees: FREE SHS

Bolgatanga Girls Senior High School (also known as BOGISS, Lily of the North) is an all female second cycle institution in the Bolgatanga Municipality in Bolgatanga in the Upper East Region of Ghana, established in 1956 as a girls' middle boarding school to expand opportunities for girls in northern Ghana and converted to Bolgatanga Women's Training college in 1965 to train female teachers. Following changes in Ghana's educational system, it transformed into a girls' senior high school in 1973, admitting its first cohort of 35 students as a secondary school. During the educational reforms of the early 1990s, the institution retained its identity as a girls' secondary school and, with subsequent reforms, became known as Bolgatanga Girls' Senior High School. Today it is one of the leading public girls' senior high schools in Ghana's Upper East Region. As of 2023, the headmistress is Patricia Agoteba Anaba. Bolgatanga Girls' Senior High School celebrated its Golden Jubilee in 2023, marking 50 years since its establishment as a girls' secondary school in 1973. The anniversary was celebrated under the theme "Girl Child Education: A Critical Tool for National Development." Activities included the launch of the anniversary celebrations, fundraising initiatives, alumni homecoming events, and the commissioning of development projects. During the celebrations, school authorities highlighted the institution's achievements in academics and extracurricular activities while appealing for support to address infrastructure challenges, including the need for additional classrooms, staff accommodation, furniture, and improved water facilities. The school's old students' association also contributed to campus development by renovating facilities such as the dining hall, library, and infirmary, painting parts of the school, and constructing a mechanized borehole.

== School Code ==
0090401

== School Category ==
Category A
