= Frafra =

Frafra or Farefare may refer to:

- Frafra people, a subset of the Gurunsi peoples in Ghana
- Frafra language (also known as Gurene), a Niger–Congo language spoken by the Frafra people of northern Ghana, and also in southern Burkina Faso.
