= Colin Vallon =

Swiss jazz pianist

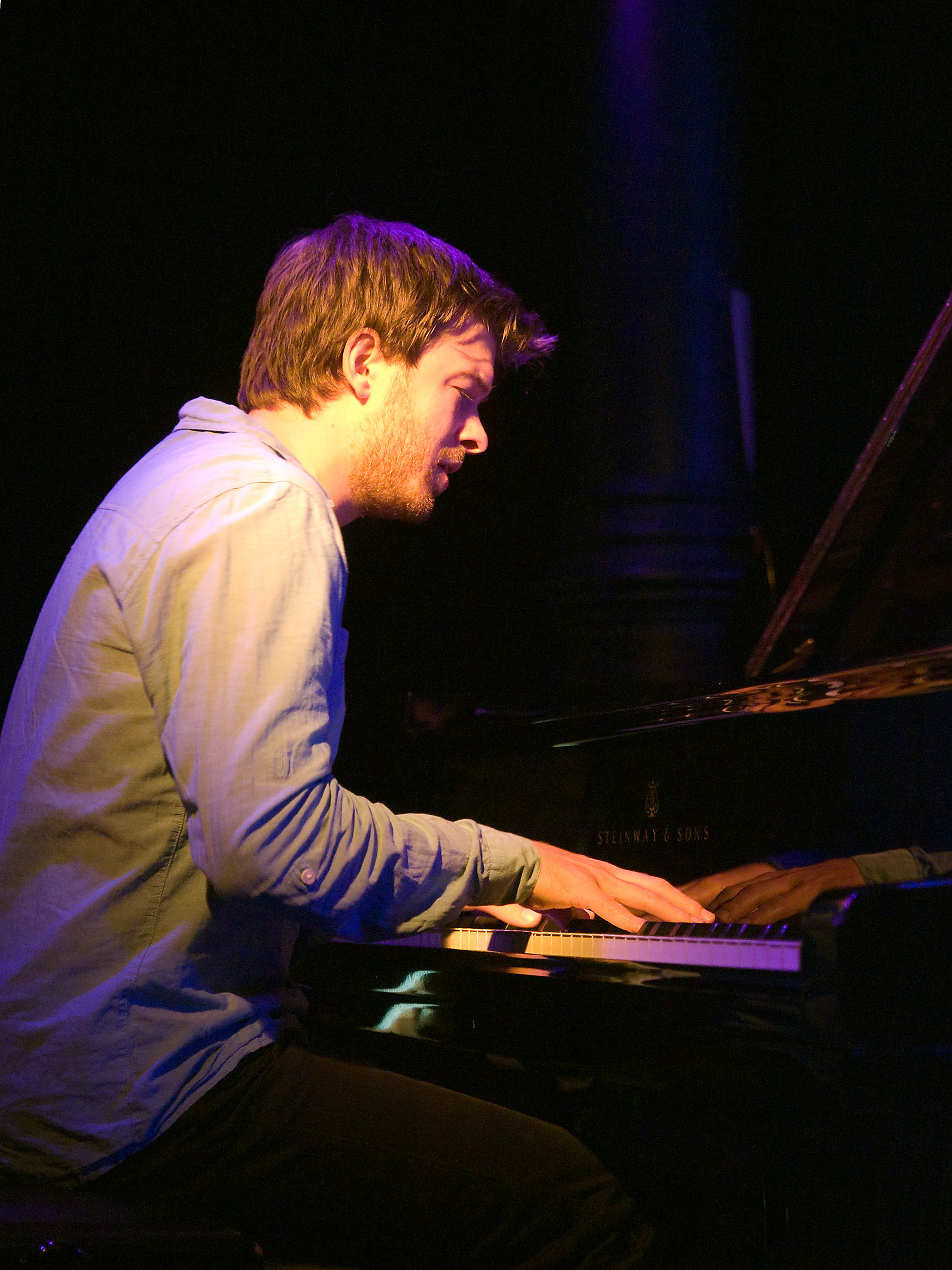
- Colin Vallon in Jazzclub Unterfahrt (Munich 2010)

Background information
- Born: 17 November 1980 (age 45); Lausanne, Switzerland
- Genre: Jazz
- Occupation: Jazz pianist
- Instrument: piano
- Website: www.colinvallon.com/en

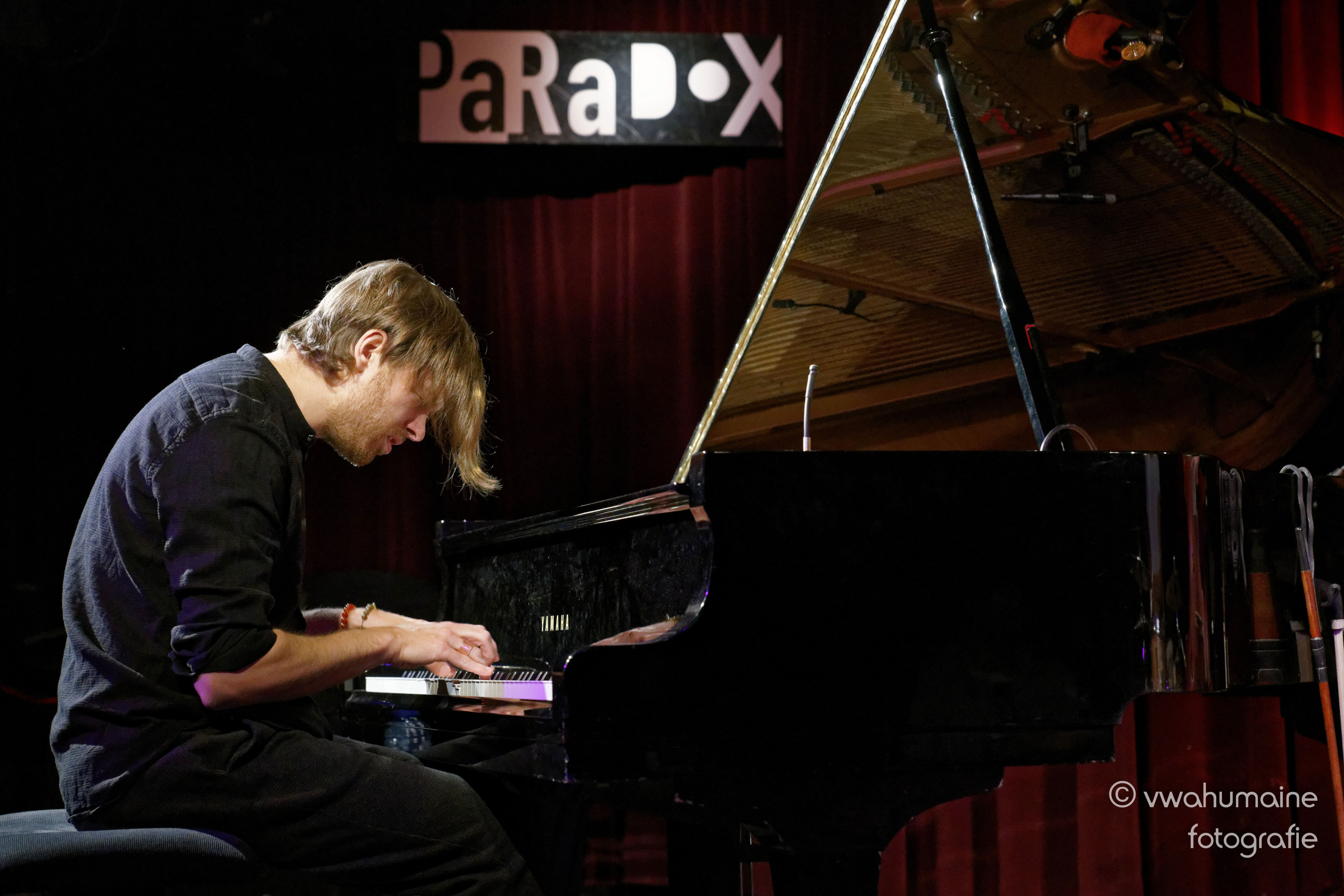
Colin Vallon at Paradox Tilburg (Netherlands) on 17 November 2017. He performed with his Colin Vallon Trio.

Colin Vallon (born 17 November 1980 in Lausanne) is a Swiss jazz pianist.

== Biography ==
Vallon studied classical music for two years before he started studies with jazz pianist Marc Ueter at fourteen years of age. In 1998 he attended the Swiss Jazz School and studied with Silvano Bazan, William Evans, Manuel Bärtsch, and Bert Joris.

Colin Vallon Trio was founded in 1999, with bassist Lorenz Beyeler and drummer Raphaël Pedroli, releasing his debut album Les Ombres in 2004. He started to develop his own piano techniques at this time and the trio opens the Swiss Diagonales Festival with New-York guitarist Kurt Rosenwinkel. In 2005 he forms a new trio with bassist Patrice Moret and drummer Samuel Rohrer, releasing the album Ailleurs (2007) on the label HatHut Records. The third trio album Rruga was released in 2011 on the ECM label. Rohrer was replaced by drummer Julian Sartorius in 2012. The fourth album Le Vent was released in 2014. The trio has been very active on the international jazz scene. Numerous concerts at international festivals in places like Wilisau, Paris, Vienne, Rome, London, Portland, Montreal, in addition to tours in Europe, Canada, the United States, Japan, South Korea.

Vallon has also composed much music like the music of the choreographical piece Hallo by Martin Zimmermann. He was part of the creation of Gossenreiter, a documentary Film. In 2015 the «Bee-Flat» jazz and world music venue in Bern, gives him a Carte Blanche to present three new projects, Ocre, a psychedelic rock oriented quartet with trumpeter Matthieu Michel, bassist Flo Götte, and drummer Domi Chansorn, Coriolis, a minimal improvisation quartet with vocalist and electronica artist Joy Frempong and clarinetist Hans Koch, and Fauna, a composition for cellos, harps, saxophones and drums, inspired by the strangeness of the animal world.

Vallon was awarded the Fridl-Wald Foundation Prize, the 1st Prize in the Competition Nescafé Let's Jazz Together, and the 3rd Prize in the Montreux International Jazz Piano Solo Competition. In 2004 Pro Helvetia commissioned a composition by him and he founded a new quintet, Colin Vallon Cinq with French trumpeter Erik Truffaz. In 2008 he won the Nico Kaufmann Foundation prize and in 2009 the SUISA foundation prize. 2009 the Colin Vallon trio won the Pro Helvetia high priority jazz promotion, and he was nominated for the 2016 Swiss Music Prize and in 2017 he was the recipient of the «Prix de la Relève du Canton de Vaud».

== Discography (in selection) ==
=== Solo albums ===
With Colin Vallon Trio

- 2004: Les Ombres (Unit Records), with Lorenz Beyeler and Raphaël Pedroli
- 2006: Ailleurs (hatOLOGY), with Patrice Moret and Samuel Rohrer
- 2011: Rruga (ECM), with Patrice Moret and Samuel Rohrer
- 2014: Le Vent (ECM), with Patrice Moret and Julian Sartorius
- 2017: Danse (ECM), with Patrice Moret and Julian Sartorius

=== Collaborations ===
With Daniel Schläppi feat. Jürg Bucher and Colin Vallon

- 2003: Dimensions (Brambus)

With Contreband (Colin Vallon, Lorenz Beyeler, Raphaël Pedroli)

- 2010: Contreband (Unit Records)

With Nicolas Masson, Patrice Moret, and Lionel Friedli

- 2018: Travelers (ECM)
