= Yagle-Kuure Festival =

Festival in Ghana by the people of Tindongsobligo

Yagle-Kuure Festival is an annual festival celebrated by the chiefs and people of Tindongsobligo near Bolgatanga in the Upper East Region of Ghana. It is usually celebrated in the months of January and February.

== Celebrations ==
During the festival, people in the community are told to desist from burning the bush indiscriminately especially in the shrine areas and sacred grove.

== Significance ==
The festival is celebrated by the people as a family ritual for thanksgiving to their God and their ancestors for blessing them with abundant food and also for protecting them throughout the year.
