= Kologo (musical instrument) =

String instrument of the Frafra people

The Kologo is a traditional two-stringed lute played by the Frafra (Gurune) people or Northern Ghana and parts of southern Burkina Faso. It is one of the best known indigenous string instruments of northern Ghana and is used in accompanying singing, storytelling, praise songs, dances, and social ceremonies. The instrument is played by plucking or strumming its strings while the performer sings, often using repetitive rhythmic patterns. It belongs to a wider family of West African lutes that includes the xalam, hoddu, ngoni, and kontigi. Although these instruments share similar construction, they differ in musical traditions, playing styles, and local names.

== Etymology ==
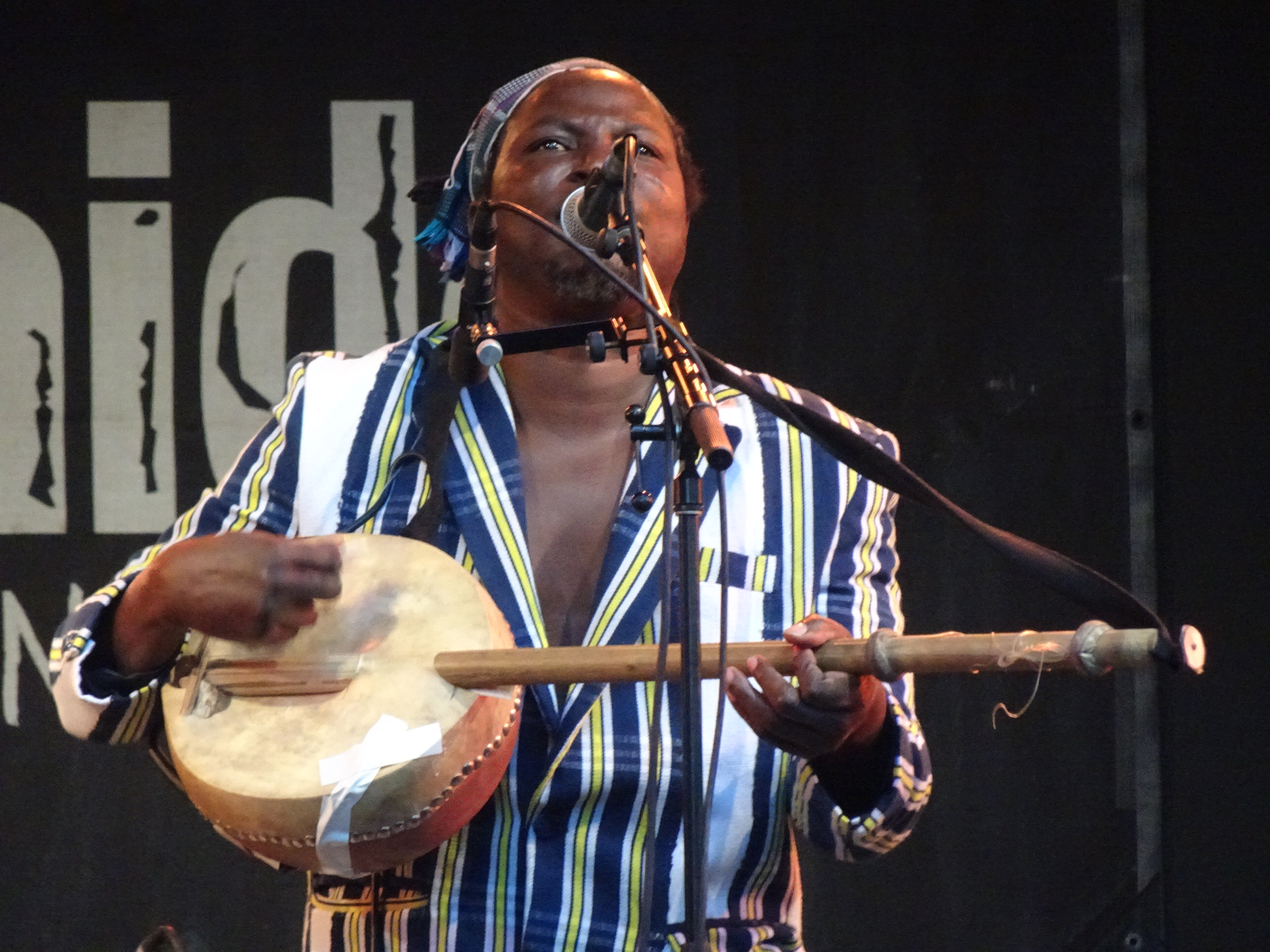
Playing the Kologo

The name kologo comes from the Gurune (Frafra) language. Similar instruments are known by different names across West Africa, reflecting the linguistic and cultural diversity of the region. In some academic literature, the instrument is discussed alongside related lutes such as the kolgo, koriko, and xalam, while these are generally regarded as a distinct regional variants rather than identical instruments.

== Classification ==
Kologo is classified as a chordophone because its sound is produced by vibrating strings. Under the Hornbostel-Sachs system, it belongs to the group of spike lutes, in which the neck passes through a resonator and strings run parallel to the soundboard.

== History ==
The exact origin of the kologo is not known, however, Ethnomusicologists consider it part of an ancient family of West African lutes and has existed for centuries. Similar instruments are found across Ghana, Burkina Faso, Mali, Senegal, Niger, Mauritania, Nigeria, and Gambia, suggesting a long history of cultural exchange among communities in the region.

In Ghana, the instrument has long been associated with the Frafra people of the Upper East Region . During the late twentieth and early twenty-first centuries, it gained wider national and international recognition through musicians who incorporated it into contemporary styles while maintaining its traditional playing techniques.

== Description ==
The kologo is a small lute with two strings. It is traditionally made from:

- a calabash gourd that serves as the resonator.
- animal hide stretched over the resonator
- a wooden neck passing through the resonator
- a wooden bridge supporting the strings
- two strings, traditionally made from animal material and now commonly made from nylon fishing line .

Many modern instruments also include tuning pegs for easier tuning. Earlier forms often used leather straps instead of pegs.
