= Frempong =

Frempong is a surname. Notable people with the surname include:

- James Frempong (born 1989), Swedish professional footballer
- Joy Frempong (born 1978), Swiss-Ghanaian singer and electronic music artist

== See also ==
- Frimpong
