= Roland Atanga Ayoo Nyaaba =

Roland Atanga Ayoo Nyaaba (born June 25, 1972) is a Ghanaian politician and the Municipal Chief Executive Officer for Bolgatanga municipal assembly in the Upper East region of Ghana.

== Early life and education ==
Roland Atanga Ayoo was born and bred in Zaare in the Upper East region of Ghana. He read Bachelor of Arts (Honours) Degree in History and Information Studies at University of Ghana, Legon. He also obtained a Diploma in Library Studies from the same university and a Teacher's Certificate 'A' from Gbeweah Training College, Pusiga.
