= Don Festival =

Festival in Ghana by the people in Bolgatanga

Don Festival is an annual festival celebrated by the chiefs and people of Bolgatanga in the Upper East Region of Ghana. It is usually celebrated in the month of May.

== Celebrations ==
During the festival, visitors are welcomed to share food and drinks. The people put on traditional clothes and there is durbar of chiefs. There is also dancing and drumming.

== Significance ==
This festival is celebrated to mark an event that took place in the past.
