= Frimpong =

Frimpong is an Ashanti surname. Notable people with the surname include:

- Abraham Frimpong (born 1993), Ghanaian footballer
- Dominic Frimpong (2005–2026), Ghanaian footballer
- Emmanuel Frimpong (born 1992), Ghanaian footballer
- Eric Asamoah-Frimpong (born 1990), Ghanaian footballer
- Godfried Frimpong (born 1999), Dutch footballer
- Joetex Asamoah Frimpong (born 1982), Ghanaian footballer
- Jeremie Frimpong (born 2000), Dutch footballer
- K. Frimpong (1939-2005), Ghanaian singer
- Kwame Pele Frimpong (born 1983), Ghanaian footballer
- Maame Ewusi-Mensah Frimpong (born 1976), American district court judge
- Tina Frimpong Ellertson (born 1982), American female footballer
- Yaw Frimpong (born 1986), Ghanaian footballer
- Kenneth Frimpong, professor
- Denis Frimpong, Czech-Ghanaian Mixed Martial Artist

== See also ==
- Frempong
- Frimpong-Boateng, surgeon and politician
- Frimpong Manso, footballer
- Shirley Frimpong-Manso, film director
