= Bolgatanga East District =

- District
- Districts of Upper East Region

- Location of Bolgatanga East District within Upper East
- Coordinates: 10°47′22″N 0°48′9″W
- Country: Ghana
- Region: Upper East
- Capital: Zuarungu

Population (2021)
  - Total: 38,824
- Time zone: UTC+0 (GMT)
- ISO 3166 code: GH-UE-BE

Bolgatanga East District is one of the fifteen districts in Upper East Region, Ghana. Originally it was formerly part of the then-larger Bolgatanga District in 1988; until the eastern part of the district was later split off to create Bolgatanga East District on 15 March 2018, which was established by Legislative Instrument (L.I.) 2350; thus the remaining part has been retained as Bolgatanga Municipal District, with the border between the two being marked by the Agrumatue. The district assembly is located in the central part of Upper East Region and has Zuarungu as its capital town.

== Villages ==
The Bolgatanga East District is made up of many communities which are largely rural and lack basic social amenities. Some of the communities in the Bolgatanga East District include Zonno, Kumbɔsikɔ, Yarigabiisi, Kantia, Nyokuko, kataŋa, Dulugɔ, Gɔnɔ, Asɔŋen, Beenkutɛ, Kangoo, Dubilla, Dakio, Dabooren (tiŋeren, saazuo), Mossi, Kukua.

== Sources ==
- "Districts of Ghana". Statoids.
