= Bolgatanga Technical University =

Public higher-education institution in Ghana

Coordinates: 10°49′38″N 0°56′22″W

- Other name: BTU
- Motto: Mi'ilum La Nu'isi Tuuma Nde Beere
- Type: Public
- Established: 1999; 27 years ago
- Chairperson: Francis Atindaana Abantanga
- Vice-Chancellor: Samuel Erasmus Alnaa
- Students: c. 2,000-3,000
- Postgraduates: 0
- Doctoral students: 0
- Location: Post Office Box 767, Sumburungu, Bolgatanga, Bolgatanga, Upper East Region, Ghana
- Campus: Suburban
- Website: www.bolgatu.edu.gh

The Bolgatanga Technical University BTU, (formerly Bolgatanga Polytechnic) is a public tertiary institution in the Upper East Region of Ghana, West Africa. It is gradually increasing its courses and facilities following the achievement of university status. It was converted into a Technical University during the administration of the former president of Ghana, John Dramani Mahama. The institution was established in 1999 but started rolling out its academic programs in September 2003 as Bolgatanga Polytechnic.

== Campuses ==
Currently, the university has two campuses, with the main operations at Sumbrungu on the Bolgatanga–Navrongo highway, opened in 2007. Bolgatanga is the capital of the Upper East Region of Ghana and has a population of under 70,000 people. The university began as a School in Bukere, a suburb of Bolgatanga. The pioneer staff worked from there until the Sumbrungu campus was finished. Bukere currently has an Evening School where both tertiary and non-tertiary programs are run.

== History ==
The school was founded in 1999 under PNDC Law 321(1992) which was amended in 2007 with an Act of Parliament (Act 745). It was converted into a Technical University in April, 2020, by the Technical Universities amendment Act 2020 (Act 1016).

Academic programmes began in September 2003 in Bukere. Over the years, the University has grown in terms of infrastructure, staff numbers and their qualifications, academic programmes and student numbers.

== Governance ==
=== University Council ===
University Council Members
==== Dr. Bishop Akolgo ==== Chairman	==== Prof. Samuel Erasmus Alnaa ==== Vice Chancellor	==== Miss. Fawzia Abagnamah Yakubu ==== Government Nominee	==== Dr. Aaron Issa Anafure Evans ==== Government Nominee
Prof. Awinkene Atintono National Council for Tertiary Education	==== Prof. Gilbert Abotisem Abiiro ==== Government nominee	Mr. Freeman Abramani Association of Ghana Industries	Ms. Phyllis Andoh Council for technical & vocational education & training
==== Mr. Rufus D. Peter ==== PAAG	==== Pro. Emmanuel Ceasar Ayamba ==== Convocation - teaching	==== Surv. Dr. George Dordah ==== TEACHING	Surv. Maxwell Kwotua Petio Convocation - non teaching
==== Mr. Cletus Atambire Amaya ==== JUNIOR STAFF ASSOCIATION	==== Mr. Iddrisu Tijani ==== SRC	==== Mr. Forson Dela Fiaxoh ==== alumni	==== Mr. Timothy Pangbot ==== GRASAG
==== Mrs. Salma Abdulai ==== Employers Association	Mr. Yorose Zachary Association of Principals of Technical Institutions		

== Academic programmes and departments ==
The university runs over twenty-five different tertiary programmes at BTech, HND and Diploma level in three Schools;

- School of Business and Management Studies
- School of Applied Science and Arts
- School of Engineering.

Ecological Agriculture is the niche area of the university, situated in a dryland region with extensive cropping and livestock herding, relatively close to Togo and Burkina Faso. The university has built industrial partnerships with the Ministry of Agriculture, the Savanah Agriculture Research Institute (SARI), and the Skills Development Fund (SDF) to improve agriculture in the savannah region of Ghana. Master's degrees in Ecological Agriculture and Agricultural Engineering are planned.

DEPARTMENTS
School of Applied Science and Arts	School of Engineering	School of Business and Management Studies
Department of Hotel Catering and Institutional Management (HCIM)	Department of Building Technology	Department of Procurement and Logistics Management
Department of Ecological	Department of Electrical/ Electronic Engineering	Department of Marketing
Department of Industrial	Department of Civil Engineering	Department Accounting and Finance
Department of Statistics	Department of Mechanical Engineering	Department of Secretary ship and Management Studies
Department of Medical Laboratory Technology	Department of Agricultural Engineering	
Department of Liberal Studies		

COURSES AND PROGRAMMES
HIGHER NATIONAL DIPLOMA PROGRAMMES{HND}
HND Hotel Catering and Institutional Management (HCIM)
HND Statistics
HND Civil Engineering
HND Mechanical Engineering
HND Industrial Arts (Graphic design, Leather Works, Ceramics, Sculpture)

BACHELOR OF TECHNOLOGY PROGRAMMES
Accounting with Computing
Procurement and Supply Chain Management

DIPLOMA PROGRAMMES
Diploma in Computerized Accounting (DCA)
Diploma in Business Administration (DBA)
Diploma in Banking Technology and Accounting (DBTA)

CERTIFICATE COURSES
Advanced Fashion and Design
Advanced Cookery/ Catering
Motor Vehicle Technician
Construction Technician

NON- TERTIARY PROGRAMMES
DBS Accountancy
DBS Secretary ship and Management Studies

== Collaborations ==
The Bolgatanga Technical University has associations with other schools and institutions. These include the University of Ouagadougou in Burkina Faso, closer than Ghana's capital Accra, for English Language immersion training for francophone students, and industrial placements.

The University of Maryland, Eastern Shore, USA collaborates on curriculum assessment and international best practice and standards for the hospitality and tourism curricula. There is some exchange of students and staff for research and training.

Another association is with the Apidon Academy of Science, Burkina Faso. AAS specialises in management studies and statistical training in sociology.

== Health ==
The university created a COVID-19 taskforce to make sure there was adherence to the safety protocols. This was to curb corona virus on campus as students get ready for the next academic year.

== See also ==
- List of universities in Ghana
- Education in Ghana
