= Zuarungu =

- Location in Ghana
- Coordinates: 10°47′N 0°48′W
- Country: Ghana
- Region: Upper East Region
- District: Bolgatanga East District
- Elevation: 660 ft (200 m)

Zuarungu is a town in the Upper East Region of Ghana east of Bolgatanga. The town is the capital of the Bolgatanga East District. The people living in Zuarungu are part of the Frafra tribe. Frafra and English are commonly spoken.

== Communities of Zuarungu ==
- Yarigabisi
- Agric
- Kumbosigu (Kumbosikɔ)
- Daboren
- Dulugu
- Kantia
- Asonge
- Zonno
- Sarkaribiisi
- Nyorkoko
- Kangoo
- Katanga
- Beenkutɛ
- Kunkua
- Zuarungu-Dakio
- Zuarungu-Dubila
- Zuarungu-Moshie
- Dubilla
- Dabotengren
- Zangbato moshie
- Zuarungu-Gɔnnɔ

== Assembly men ==
•David Apasera Assibi

•Asampana Francisca

•Simon Anafo

•Joe Aboah

•Asampana Francis

•Albert Agana Akugeri

•Asusiga Edmund

== Markets ==
Zuarungu holds one main market. This one is called Tu'an (Frafra for Baobab Tree) and is named after a Baobab tree that used to stand there when the market was founded. Tu'an is found around the eastern end of the DVLA Road in Zuarungu.

Additionally, there is the Timber Market which is located north of N11 in Yarigabisi. Although this market is mainly for wood you can also buy many other things there.

There are also some smaller markets around Zuarungu:

- Pusikan (Zonno)
- Beat and Boot Market (Kumbosikɔ )

== Education ==
- Nurse and Midwifery Training College Zuarungu
- Zuarungu Senior High School
- Gambibgo Community Day Senior High School

== Geologische Besonderheiten ==
=== Dams ===
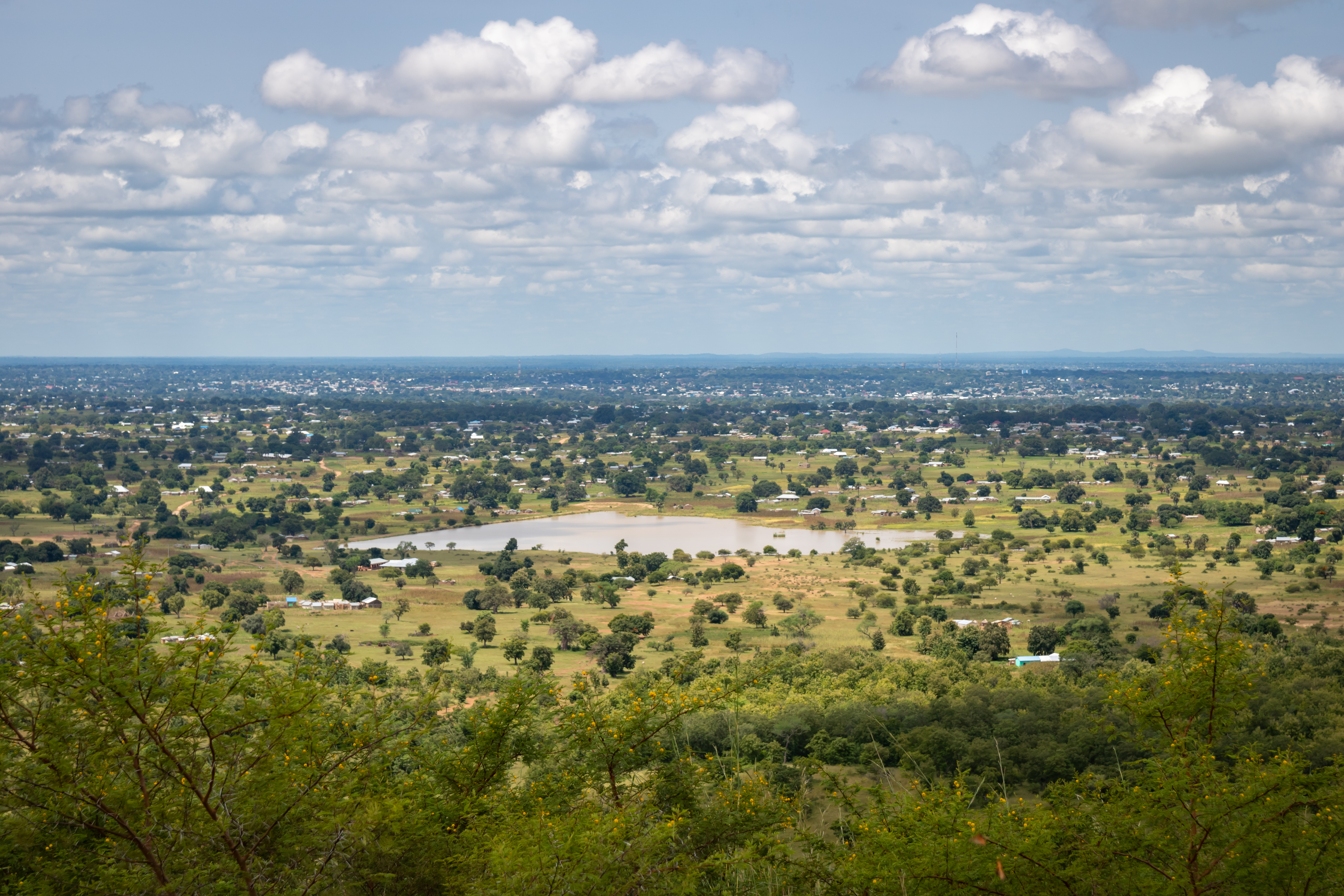

Many of the communities of Zuarungu have their own dams which are mainly used for agriculture. During the dry season the water is used by cattle to drink and also to water plants to make farming possible while no rain is falling.

=== Zonno-Zoore ===
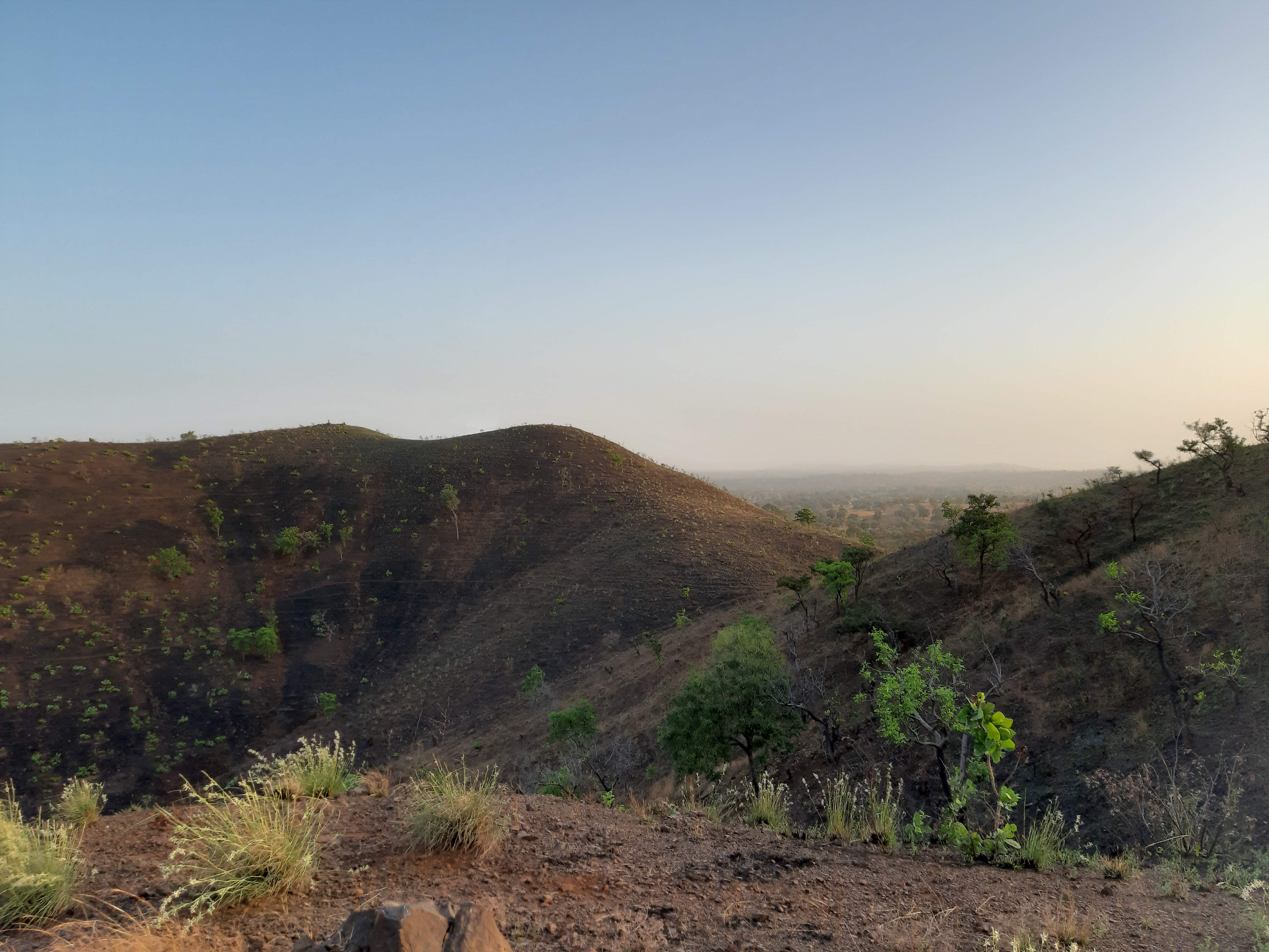

Zonno-Zoore (locally also Zonzoore) is a hill chain east of Zuarungu near the communities of Zonno and Nyorkoko. It is formed by four main hills and many smaller hills. None of the hills of Zonzoore has a name. The maximum elevation of the hills is 348 m. Zoore is Frafra and can be translated as mountain or rock.
