= Joy Frempong =

Swiss jazz pianist

- in 2025

Background information
- Born: 17 November 1980 (age 45); Bolgatanga, Switzerland
- Genre: Jazz
- Occupations: vocalist and electronica artist
- Website: www.oy-music.com

Joy Frempong is a Ghanaian-born Swiss vocalist and electronica artist who collaborates with a producer/drummer whose real name is less known. The duo uses the name OY.

== Life ==
Frempong was born in Bolgatanga in far northern Ghana although she and her family emigrated when she was a child. Her mum was from Switzerland and her dad was from Ghana. They lived in Dietlikon in Zurich.

She was fluent in German and her school mates called her "chocolate", but only in fun. She decided, she was Swiss when she was fourteen, as she had spent half her life in Switzerland. Her family had never intended to stay so long but an accident with one of her Swiss great-grandparents delayed her parent's return.

She studied jazz and ethnology before she studied at the Bern Academy of the Arts.

Even before her first album she had a nomination with the Bern band called Filewile for the 2010 Swiss Music Awards. Their electro-pop song, blueskywell, was recorded in 2009. It did not win the Jury Prize. She had returned to visit Ghana and also nearby countries when she and a collaborator took up the name OY. She recorded OY's first album which was called "First Box Then Walk". The title came from a friend's anecdote. She had said that as a childd she would throw a punch around corners before she turned - to keep herself safe.

Frempong and Lleluja-Ha appear as OY in 2013

In 2013 OY's next album was called Kokokyinaka and the recording company allowed her to do as she wished.

In 2015 OY created a new album called No Problem Saloon. She was living in Berlin with her media shy collaborator who is also Swiss. He appears with his face covered. Fremlong had visited Africa and recorded a strange mixture of sounds from car doors closing to fireworks and the sound of a taxi driver telling stories. Her collaborator joined these into their album. He plays drums and records and his stage name is "Lleluja-Ha".

Their fourth album was called World Wide We and her collaborator called himself Melodydreamer but his face was hidden. They were now firmly based in Berlin although in 2023 their music was said to be from one of "Berlin’s best up-and-coming artists".

In 2026 she collaborated with Ripperton to create an album track called "Sirens". Ripperton had heard her music on Swiss radio fifteen years before but it took a while for they played together as they had agreed.
