= Sumbrungu =

Community in Upper East Region, Ghana

- Town
- Location of Sumbrungu in Upper East region
- Coordinates: 10°49′54.8″N 00°57′39.8″W
- Country: Ghana
- Region: Upper East Region
- District: Bolgatanga Municipal District
- Elevation: 177 m (581 ft)
- Time zone: GMT
  - Summer (DST): GMT
- Postal code: UB
- Area code: 039
- Climate: BSh

Sumbrungu is a community in the Bolgatanga Municipality in the Upper East Region of Ghana. The Bolgatanga Polytechnic is located in the town. As at 2012, the chief of the community was Naba Atogboyenge.

== History ==
In the late 1970s and early 1980s, about 7051.44 acres or 2,8853.72 hectares of land in the community were released to the Government of Ghana by the people of the region.

== Institutions ==
The following institutions are located in the community:

- Sumbrungu Health Centre.
- St. Francis of Assisi Catholic Church.
- Mother & Child Hospital

== Notable natives ==
- Johnson Agolmah, a community leader
- Jonas Acheampong, secretary of the Sumbrungu Taxi Drivers Association
- John Asaah, chairman of the Sumbrungu Taxi Drivers Association
- Elias Ayinbila Apasiya, founder of the Light of Hope Foundation in the town
- Gbenga Solomon George, headteacher of Asoegoom School
