= Bolgatanga Municipal District =

Bolgatanga Municipal District District Municipal de Bolgatanga
- Municipal District
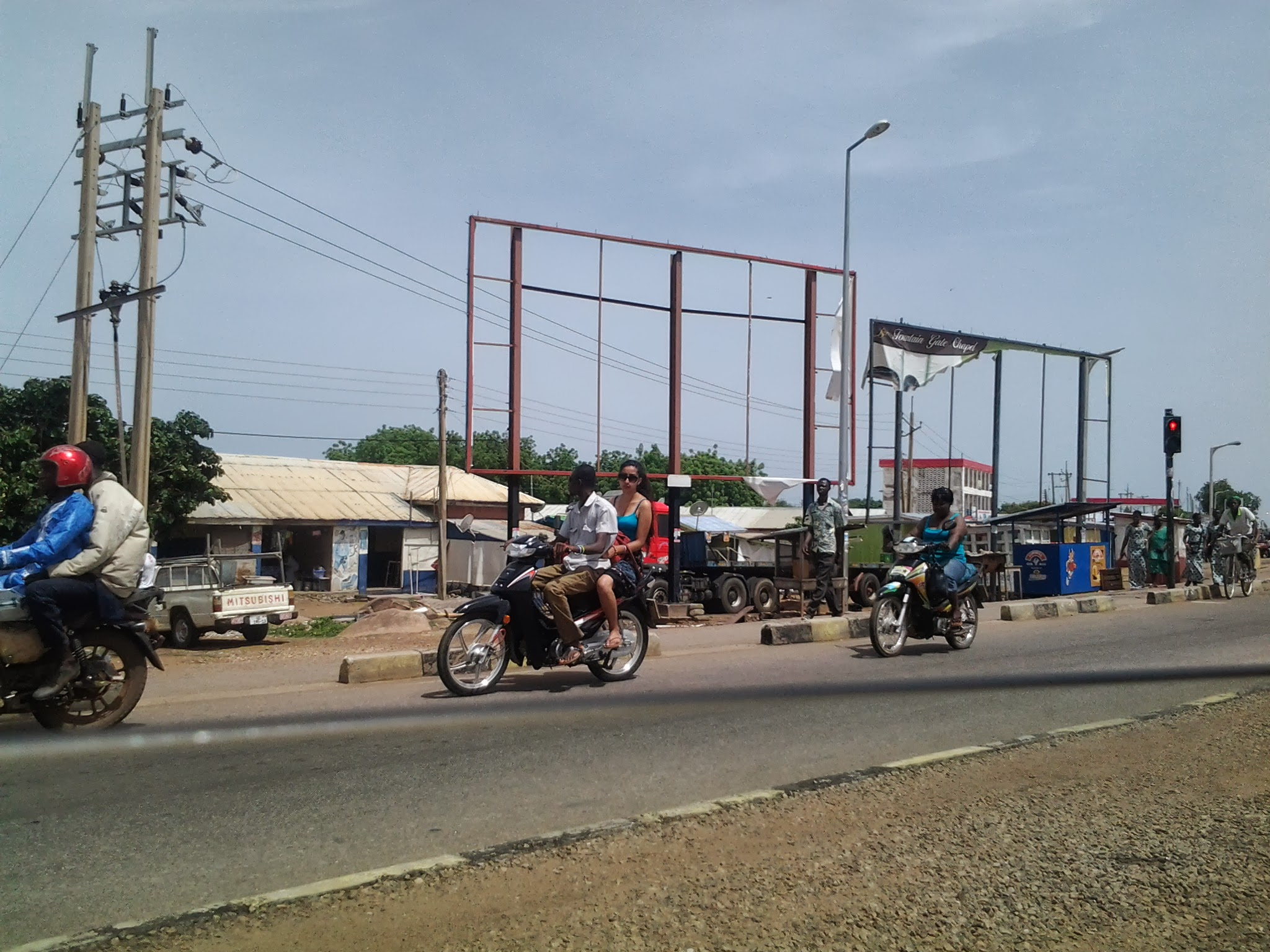
- View of street in Bolgatanga Municipal District

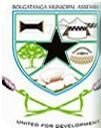
- Seal

- Districts of Upper East Region

- Location of Bolgatanga Municipal District within Upper East
- Coordinates: 10°47′15″N 0°51′28.8″W
- Country: Ghana
- Region: Upper East
- Capital: Bolgatanga

Government
  - Municipal Chief Executive: Harry Ayamga Epsona

Area
  - Total: 729 km^{2} (281 sq mi)

Population (2021)
  - Total: 139,864
- Time zone: UTC+0 (GMT)
- ISO 3166 code: GH-UE-BO

Bolgatanga Municipal District is one of the fifteen districts in Upper East Region, Ghana. Originally created as an ordinary district assembly in 1988 when it was known as Bolgatanga District; which was established by Legislative Instrument (L.I.) 1438, until the southeast part of the district was split off by a decree of president John Agyekum Kufuor in August 2004 to create Talensi-Nabdam District; thus the remaining part was elevated to municipal district assembly status on the same year to become Bolgatanga Municipal District, which was established by Legislative Instrument (L.I.) 1797. However, on 15 March 2018, the eastern part of the district was later split off to create Bolgatanga East District, which was established by Legislative Instrument (L.I.) 2321; thus the remaining part has been retained as Bolgatanga Municipal District. The municipality is located in the central part of Upper East Region and has Bolgatanga as its capital town, which also serves as the capital of the Upper East Region.

== Climate ==
The climate is tropical with a rainy season from May to October and a dry season with virtually no rainfall from November to April. Temperatures range between a maximum of 40 degrees in March / April and at least 12 °C in December.

The natural vegetation of the district consists of tree savanna, with baobab, and acacia trees. The low vegetation is burned by fire during the dry season or dried by the sun.

== Demographics ==
The inhabitants of the municipality are predominantly grune people also known as frafra. The town of Bolgatanga, however, has a cosmopolitan character. Here are mixed not only different peoples of the north, but also members of the major ethnic groups including the Grune, Sisala, and Kanjegah peoples, as well as the Hausa and Mossi.

== Economy ==
The majority of the population in the 1990s lived, in spite of the urban structure of the district, from agriculture, 19% commercial, 12% industry, mainly handicrafts, and just 7.4% were employed in public services. There are some jobs in the mining and construction and in the form of some metal-working companies, repair shops, painting companies etc. but these represent a very small minority.

== Villages ==
The capital in the district is Bolgatanga. Some towns and villages in the district include:

- Yorogo
- Tindonsobulugu
- Tindonmolgo
- Daporetindongo
- Yarigabisi
- Zuarungu Dachio
- Gambibigo-Azuabisi
- Kumbosigo
- Sherigu Dorungu-Agobgabis
- Pobaga
- Atulbabisi
- Tanzui
- Kumbangre
- Bolga-Soe
- Bukere
- Sokabisi
- Yikine
- Sumbrungu
- Zaare

== Sources ==
- "Districts of Ghana". Statoids.
- GhanaDistricts.com
- Bolgatanga Municipality
