= Frafra people =

Ethnic group in Ghana

The Frafra are a subset of the Gurunsi peoples living in Upper East Region. The adopted name 'Frafra' is a corruption from colonial times of the salutation "Yɛ fara fara?" when translated means "How is your suffering [work]?". It may carry pejorative overtones in local usage. Frafra-language speakers number approximately 300,000. The larger group of Gurunsi people inhabit southern Burkina Faso and Upper East of Ghana.

The Frafra people, located in Northeast Ghana consists of four groups that share a similar culture, language, and overall background. These groups are known as the Gurensi, Talensi, Nabdam and Kusasi. "Frafra" is often used as a blanket term for these groups because of their shared similarities, but they are distinguishable groups that vary linguistically as well as in other key areas. The region is mostly rural, and a majority of people participate in agriculture.

The origin of the Frafra name comes from a greeting that is common among their people. The greeting is characterized by the shouting of the phrase "furra furra" three to four times while simultaneously clapping their hands.

== Geography ==
Bolgatanga is the commercial center of the Frafra area. Other important villages and towns include Bongo, Zuarungu, Zoko, and Pwalugu. Tongo is the principal town of the Talensi people, who are ethnically distinct from the Frafra, but most of whom are bilingual in the Frafra language.

The Frafra are located between the white and red Volta Rivers.

The region which the Frafra inhabit is 500–700 feet above sea level. Large hills, consisting mostly of granite or Birimian rocks, are dispersed throughout the area, two of which are known as the Tongo Hills and the Central Range Hills. The climate is a tropical savanna climate. The rainy season lasts from May to October, followed by a dry season from November to March, with the mean annual rainfall coming in at around 40 to 45 inches. Due to the existence of both seasons, there is a large range of relative readings, the highest being around 90 percent in the rainy season, and the low at around 20 percent in the dry. Monthly temperature means also vary greatly, with the highest in March at 97 °F (36 °C) and the lowest being 81 °F (27 °C) in August. Vegetation consists of wooded savanna with trees being low to the ground, including Shea trees and Baobab, and grass growing fairly tall.

== History ==
The Frafra share a common history, language and political structure. Most Gurunsi live in Burkina Faso, and the degree to which Frafra history differs from their northerly neighbors, such as the Nuna, Bwa and Winiama, is linked to their abode in Ghana. These differences arose during colonial times, as French and British colonial systems differed.

Migration

In precolonial times, the Frafra were considered to be acephalous, which means that there was no centralized authority and groups were mostly organized through lineage rather than political allegiance. Once colonialism became present in Northern Ghana, some mandates required governing through chiefs.

In recent years, other factors have contributed to the movement of these people. A major factor is population increase. It was recorded that in the area that they occupy, the population increased from 77,885 people in 2000 to 84,545 in 2010. Flooding and environmental degradation have impacted soil fertility; some Frafra attribute these to supernatural forces and social changes leading to what they see as moral transgressions. In addition, about forty percent of the ground is covered in rocky landscape that is unsuitable for farming.

This has caused many people to migrate in order to find land that is suitable for farming or for general economic opportunities. Another reason for outward mobility is high bridal prices. If a man cannot afford the dowry for his bride, many are forced to look for work elsewhere in order to obtain it. Some men migrate as a show of masculinity and ability or to prove they have reached a mature age. For some youth, traveling to the "bush" grants prestige and is considered to be a rite of passage, which is also another reason for migration. While migration was once a primarily male activity, in recent years, single women have also begun to migrate for economic reasons. Women who return with things like sewing machines and wax print are seen positively and as a better candidate for marriage, though some marry while away. Other unforeseen factors can also take a role, such as farmers settled in the Bongo region being forced to relocate due to an infestation of oncho flies.

== Society ==
=== Economy ===
Frafra are primarily farmers, growing millet, sorghum and yams. Maize, rice, peanuts, and beans are grown as well. Farmers throughout the region traditionally practiced slash-and-burn farming, using fields for approximately seven or eight years before they were allowed to lie fallow for at least a decade. In family fields close to villages, women grow cash crops for sale in local markets, including sesame and tobacco.

Men participate in hunting during the long dry season. This is important for ritual reasons, since it is during this time that men interact with the spirits that inhabit the bush. During the dry season, when food supplies are running low, some fishing is practiced in local swamps.

Increasing population pressure has led to a shortening of fallow-times and a much smaller interval for hunting. Little bushland is available for slash-and-burn methods and the clearing of new farms.

=== Political system ===
Frafra societies are mainly without social or political stratification. They are not divided among occupational castes or groups since most of them hunt and farm. They had no system of chiefs, and all important decisions were made by a council of elders consisting of the oldest members of each lineage.

Religious leaders hold some political authority, determining the agricultural cycle and parceling out land for cultivation.

There are three main structures that exist among the Frafra people to help facilitate social hierarchy. One of these authorities are chiefs, another is familial inheritance, and a third involves religion.

Chiefs can be compared to a "sergeant-major". The British used them as liaisons in order to send more workers to an area or organize the transportation of goods. Although under the hand of colonialism, traditional practices were normally allowed to ensue.

== Culture ==
=== Religion ===
The belief in a supreme creator is central to Frafra beliefs. A shrine to this god occupies the center of every village. Each extended family maintains its own house, in which magical lineage objects are kept. The objects allow the family to maintain contact with the vital forces of nature. These objects are inherited by descendants and are the communal property of the lineage. They provide protection and social cohesion among all members of the family.

The FraFra believe in the earth as a deity, with spiritual influences that transcend its physical form. They identify the Earth as well as their ancestors as balancing forces among their communities. Rituals are performed by a leader known as the tendaana, considered to be the "custodian of the earth".

Rituals

There are two main rituals practiced by the Frafra people. One is centered around agriculture and the other is funerals. Frafra funerals are an extravagant affair and last for multiple days. The main focus of the ritual is to unite the community and it is conducted more like a celebration than a solemn affair. The body is buried on the same day of the death and is washed and dressed beforehand because they believe it will spoil the land otherwise. The tendanna is in charge of burying the deceased and the body is carried around the house three times for a male and four for a female before being placed in its resting place. The grave is referred to as the "room" and is a similar in shape to domestic objects such a decanter or the shape of a typical room. This is meant to emphasize the deceased's role in society as well as to connect the world of the dead to the world of the living. Men are buried facing east while females are traditionally faced west. To show solidarity as well as an indication of their mourning, the children of the deceased shave their heads. They (particularly the eldest son) are in charge of organizing the mortuary rites that can take place anywhere from one to three years after a person has died. During this time, the dead are considered to be in a state of limbo and are neither alive or moved on until a proper wuure (funeral) takes place. The ritual can only take place during the dry season and the length differs depending on the status of the deceased. For a male leader or senior female, the funeral could last a whole week. Three days before the ceremony (four for a female), the oldest son announces that it will be starting, as it is an important public event. The ritual begins with shouting as the oldest son yells out to the compound at midnight on the first day, again using increments of three for a male and four for a female. At this point, the drums begin and the men parade through the compound dressed in full battle regalia. This lasts until the sun comes up at which point there is a short break.

The first full day is called fagba. The deceased's clothing is hung up around the compound and is used as another way to define their role within society. A man's clothing is typically displayed outside of the compound while a woman's remains indoors. The clothing of the dead is significant because they have "...the dirt of the dead man upon them."

=== Art and literature ===
The most recognized of the Frafra art forms are cast brass jewelry and decorated architecture. In addition, anthropomorphic figures sculpted from clay and wood and various personal objects, ranging from jewelry to wooden stools, are created to honor the spirits.

A body of Frafra literature is emerging. A. Pamzoya first wrote a novel on Frafra culture called Souvenir for Death. Intellectual Agaysika Agambila gathered a collection of Frafra folktales under the title Solma: Tales from Northern Ghana. This was followed by Journey, a novel set in the Frafra area.

Frafra peoples have a special, joking relationship with the Dagaare people of northwestern Ghana, which has its roots in an asserted common ancestry.

Pottery

Pottery is very important to the FraFra as potters are considered to have a particular connection to the earth. It is considered to be a practice for woman and they are the only ones who participate. Pottery is mainly used for domestic and ritualistic purposes, but a small portion of it is produced for commercial use with the intent to be sold.

There are four major motifs for pottery made among the Gurensi people. The first common decoration is the yie, which is a curved line meant to resemble the first phase of the moon, and thus symbolically the beginning of something. It is also said to have associations with kura, which is a word that refers to the grass "ropes" used to secure the rafters in homes. The second motif is called zanlenga, which are nets used to store calabash bowls. It is thought to be a symbol of marriage and is used for women's burial rites. The third motif is wanzageze, or a broken shard of calabash, and is meant to represent women's role as a wife as well as a mother. The shard sends a message saying that although it is no longer whole and has served its intended purpose, it still remains and can be seen as a sign of continuation. The fourth and final motif are tana, which are pieced together strips of cloth used for the construction of men's smocks. This motif stands in opposition to the wanganeze motif, representing the beginning of a journey. Men's smocks are also considered to be a marker of status and can symbolize security, good fortune, and stand as a marker of one's achievements.

Scarification

The torso and the face are the two main body parts used for scarification. Scarification comes in many different forms, patterns, and locations depending on the person. For example, women typically have scars on their chest stomach and back. This practice is believed to be a result of the minimal clothing worn in traditional Frafra settlements and the desire for individuality. This is also the reason facial scarification is so popular because it is the most visible place and differs depending on factors like shape and character. Even families have individualized markings from one another.

The process is normally started between the ages of four and six and done by the yagenwata who is considered to have extensive experience and can be a man or a woman. Despite individuality, there are four common themes that appear: one or two deeply cut diagonal lines on one or both cheeks, continuous curved lines, patterns between the eyes and ears and the presence of geometric shapes. There are also four reoccurring patterns named dovisi, dua, bone, and bene. Dovisi is scarring all over with a leaf pattern between the eye and ear, dua looks like horizontal triangles, bone is overall scarification, and bene, which is the most popular, is one or two lines on one or both cheeks. Despite being outlawed, the practice still continues to this day. Tattoos have also become popular more recently, especially with young adults.

Marriage

Courtship is a fairly formal process among the Frafra and can last extensive periods of time. It is characterized by frequent visits to the home of the prospective bride as well as the presentation of various gifts. Common gifts include guinea fowls, kola nuts, tobacco, and alcoholic drinks. The man must also directly ask the father for his daughters hand in marriage and clearly state what his intentions are. There is also a dowry that is expected to be paid, normally in livestock. Acceptable payments usually consist of three cows or a combination of two cows and seven sheep. Young people are expected to marry early and reproduce as much as possible. This makes family sizes typically large.

Language and Demographics

Multiple languages and dialects are spoken among the Frafra people. This includes Gurune, also known as Frafra, as well as Nankani, Booni, Tallensi, and Nabdam.

=== Funeral ===
Funeral forms part of the Gurene tradition as this aims at ushering the dead into the spiritual world. The type of funeral largely depends on the sex, age, clan, leadership, etc. Funeral serves as a key determiner in one being worshiped as an ancestor thus 'Sɔ [father] or Ma [mother]'. A man is buried towards the sun rise and this signifies while a woman is buried towards sunset.

In the olden days the frafra people dig a round hole with deep and wide area that can take many bodies, some people will add a goat skin and a few cowries to bury a person.

== Clothing ==
Besides scarification, the Frafra don't have many examples of embellishing the body. Historically, they work in the fields naked, if not for the occasional skin worn over the back of a man or leaves to cover the women. Skins were meant to connect to a male's ability to hunt while leaves represent the women's relationship with the crops. Traditionally, leaves were chosen purposefully and used as a status marker. Individuality is an important concept to the Frafra, so what they wear plays a major role. The Frafra view clothing as an extension of a person and what they represent. They also believe that clothing can gain significance after being worn by someone important.

Animal skins play an important role in the wardrobe of male Frafra members. They are worn slung over the back, secured by sewing together the front and hind legs as well as wrapped around the waist. The skins were historically worn by a tindaana , otherwise known as the custodians of the earth, who assumed the role of religious and political leader in traditional Frafra practice. They wore animal skins as well as a black twine cap to signify their roles. When a new tindaana is appointed, he is stripped of the clothes he is wearing and given all new articles.

Skins are believed to please the gods, as it shows the peoples relationship to the earth as well as humans ability to assert power over its resources. They are worn during specific rituals such as the Talensi planting festival and are required to be worn during any sacrifice.

Present day, cotton cloth is worn by a majority of the population, both male and female. Women wear blouses with long wrap skirts and their hair tied up in a scarf while men wear pants or shorts with a cotton smock. There are four types of smocks. The most popular type of smock is called dansika and can be found commonly in most markets but also be commissioned specially. The next is Banaa which is worn as a signifier for success. Jampa represents high status and is worn by a lower tier chief. Kpartikoto is the highest and is only worn by the most important chief. Chiefs also wear what is called the red fez and it is a signifier of his status and role. Hunters and warriors wear a calabash helmet adorned with cowrie shells, animal hair, and feathers and is meant to show off their achievements. They are referred to as the nugo and nugo illa, and are a type of basketry cap one with a sheep hair plume, the other with bush cow horns.

In the 19th century, the Frafra were a major hub for the production of jewelry. Bangles of ivory and bone were popular among women and were another indicator of status. The highest status bangles were cast brass and signified the wearers power to protect. Ivory bands are used during courtships as a token from a father to his daughter as an outward display of the success of his household as well as the availability of his daughter.
