= Bolgatanga =

Town in Upper East Region, Ghana

- Town
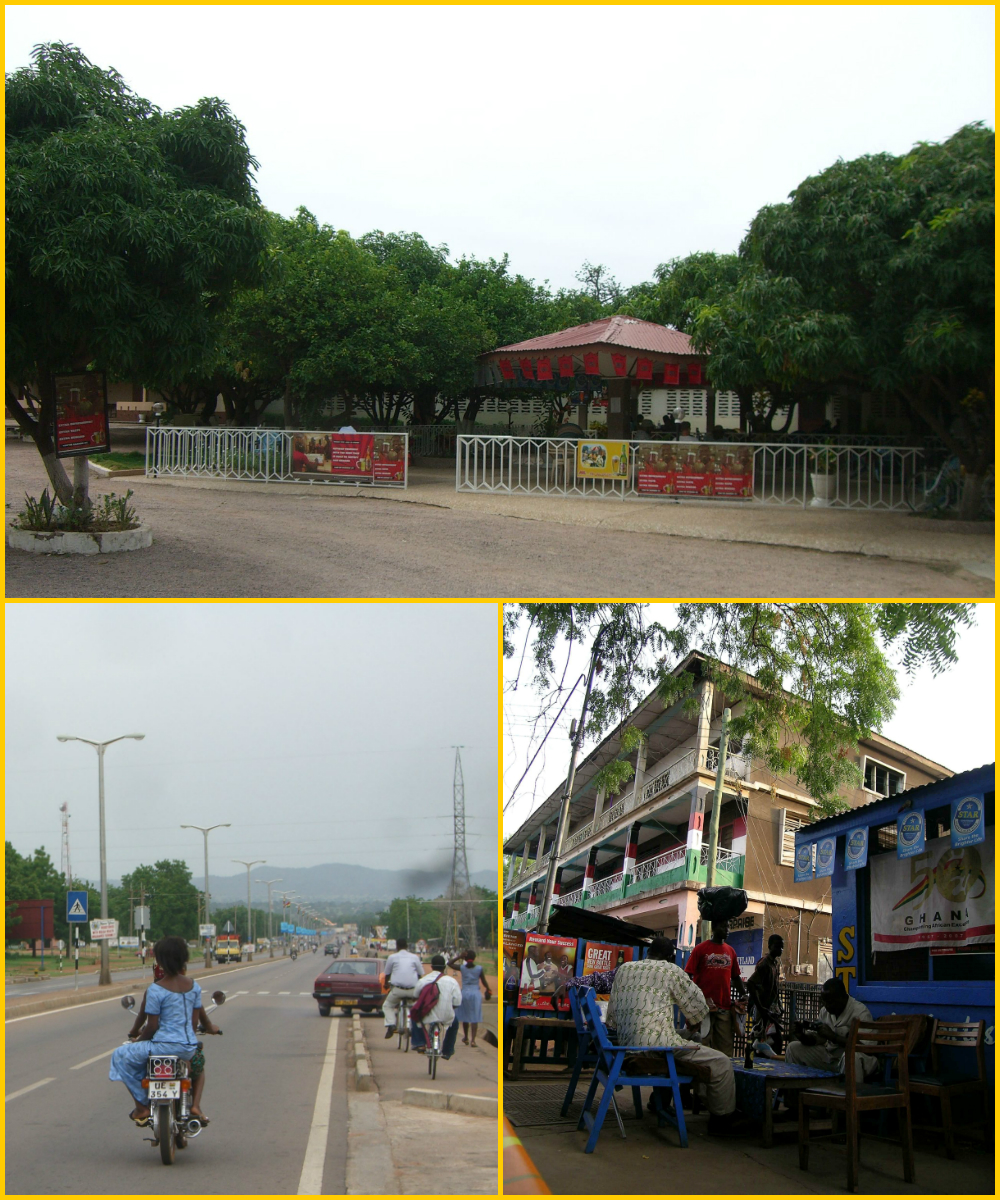
- First-top picture: Avenue Landscape and Hotel; bottom-left picture: One of many highways that goes through the town; bottom-right picture: Restaurant in Bolgatanga

- Location of Bolgatanga in Upper East region
- Coordinates: 10°47′00″N 00°51′00″W
- Country: Ghana
- Region: Upper East Region
- District: Bolgatanga Municipal District
- Elevation: 177 m (581 ft)

Population (2012)
  - Total: 66,685
  - Ethnicities: Northerner; Akan; Ewe; Ga-Adangbe
- Time zone: GMT
  - Summer (DST): GMT
- Postal code: UB
- Area code: 039
- Climate: BSh
- Website: bolma.gov.gh

Bolgatanga (Frafra: Bɔlegataŋa), colloquially known as Bolga, the capital of the Bolgatanga Municipal and the Upper East Region of Ghana. It shares a border to the north with Burkina Faso. The town lies in the Red Volta Valley, 161 km (100 mi) north of Tamale, with the White Volta and the cliffs of the southern Gambaga escarpment forming the southern boundary of the Upper East Region. Some ethnic groups native to Bolgatanga are the Frafra, Daghati, Akan, Ewe, and Ga-Adangbe. The current mayor of the town is Rex Asanga.

== History ==
=== Formation ===
The name Bolgotanga is derived from the Gurene words for migrant (Bolba) and pyramid, or gathering rock (Tanga). Historically, the town was located close to the Trans-Saharan trade route. Siddharth Kara writes that Bolgatanga served as a market where captives from the Sahel were sold to Hausa merchants as part of the African slave trade. Because many trade routes crossed the Gurensi region, by the end of the 19th century the area had grown into an important trade hub In 1910, Bolgatanga was connected with the rest of Ghana with the addition of a road.

== Administration ==
The town has a mayor–council form of government. The mayor (executive chief) is appointed by the president of Ghana and approved by the town council, the Bolgatanga Municipal Assembly. The current mayor of Bolgatanga is Roland Atanga Ayoo Nyaaba.

== Demographics ==
The majority of the town is religious, making up 97.3% of the town's population, while the biggest religions in the town are Christianity (57.6%), traditional religions (22.3%), and Islam (17.1%). Majors ethnic groups who lived in Bolgatanga are Northerners (mainly Frafra), Kassena, Kusasi, Akan, Ewe, and Ga-Adangbe. As of 2021, the town has a population of about 142,509 people, with women (74,659) representing 52.4 %, and men (67,850) constituting the remaining 47.6 %.

== Transportation ==
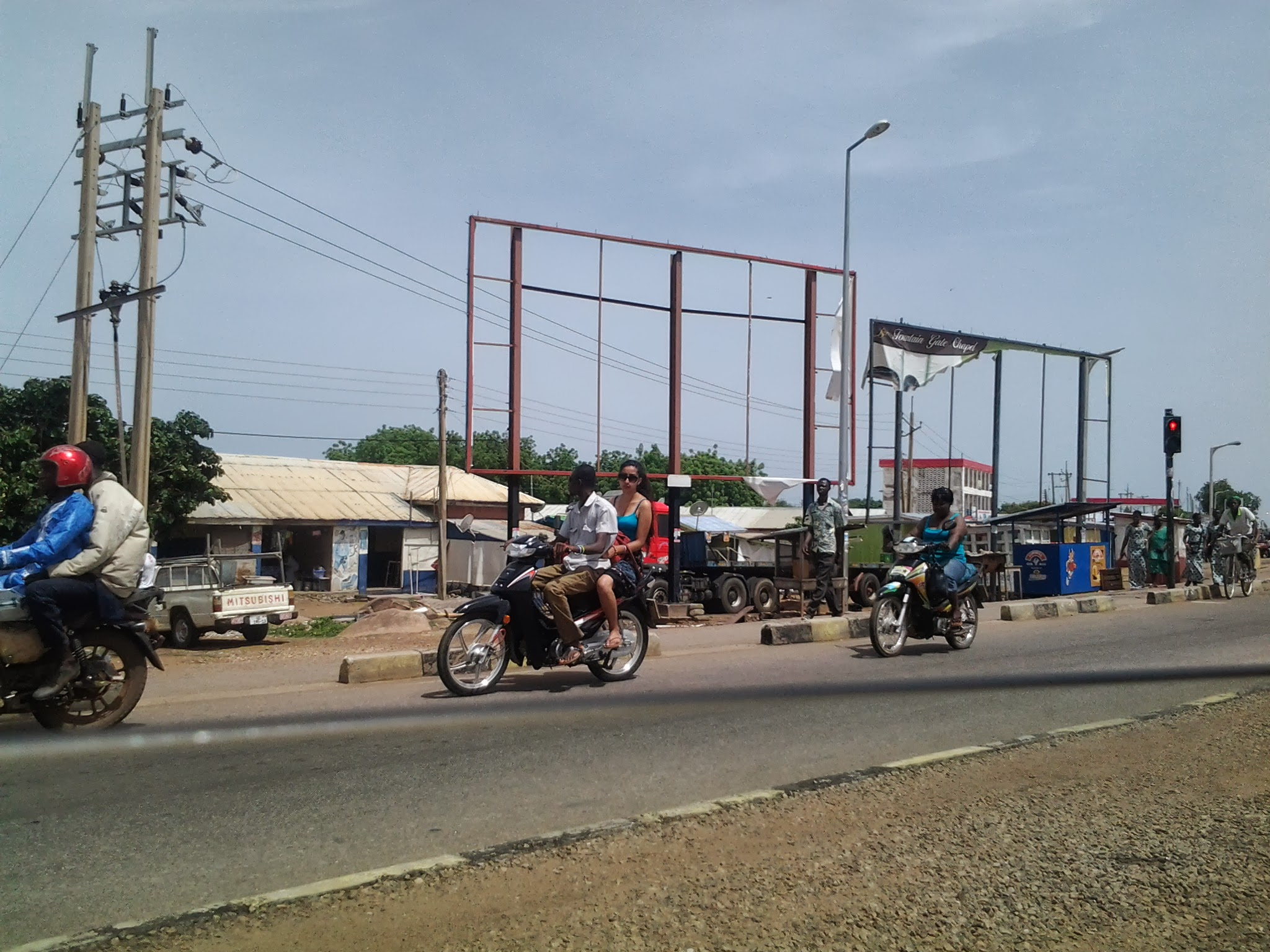
Street in Bolgatanga

There is public transportation from Bolgatanga to major cities such as Accra, Kumasi, Mim, Ahafo, Cape Coast, Sunyani, Tamale, Tema, Ho, Wa, Elubo, Aflao, and Techiman. The most popular form of intracity transport is a covered rickshaw popularly referred to as 'candoos'. For the transportation of goods, an uncovered tricycle popularly known as "motor king" is used. Though the use of Donkey Carts for carrying goods has been part of the life of the people of Bolgatanga it is scarce due to rapid development.

In 2016, a $141 million project was underway to help increase the quality of transportation of the Bolgatanga-Bawku-Pulmakom Road. Originally supposed to be completed sometime in 2018, due to some unresolved issues it was push back to late-2024.

== Culture ==
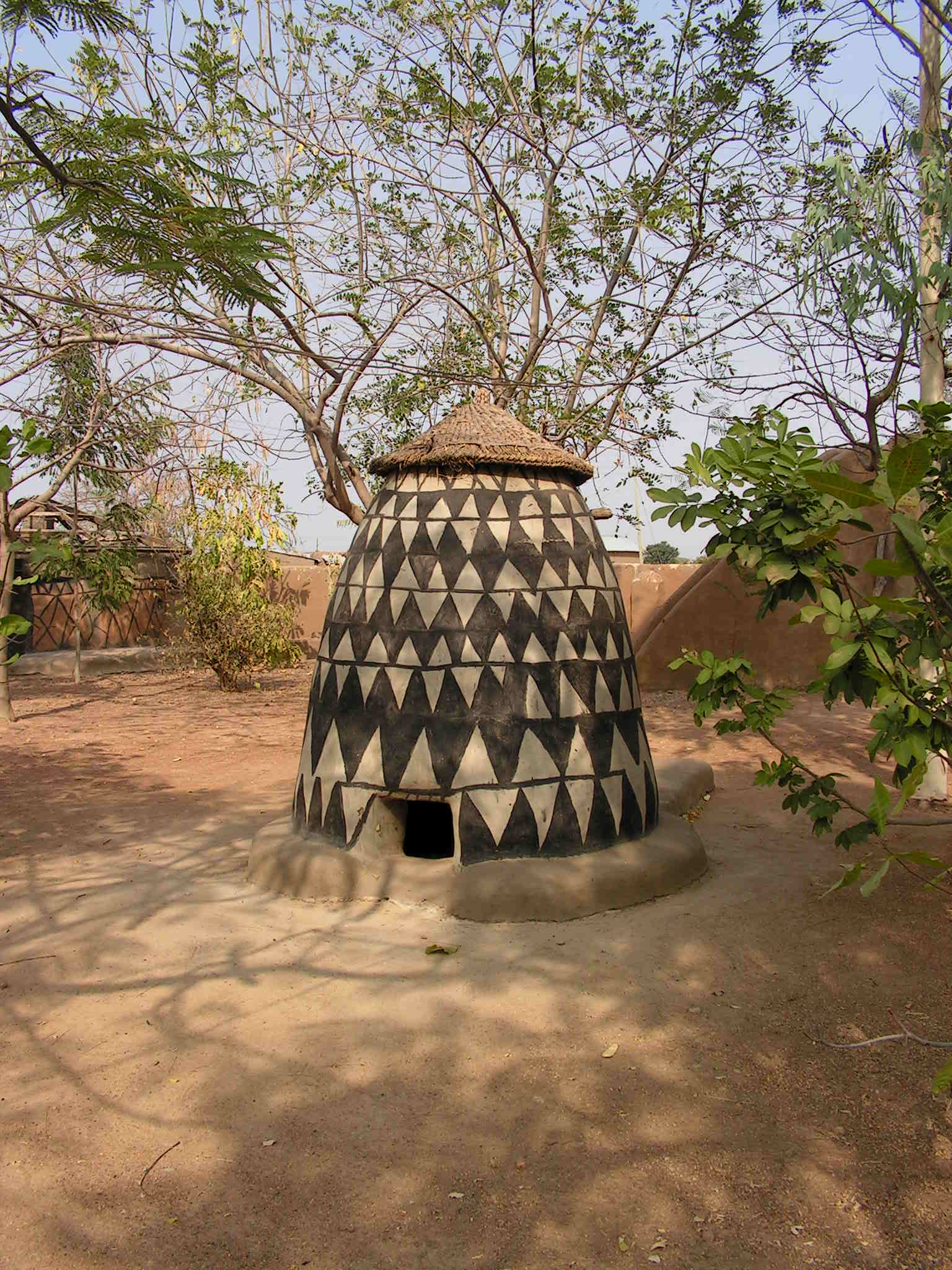
Sumbrungu Painted Building in Bolgatanga

Bolgatanga is known as the crafts centre of the Upper East Region, with a large central market. Apart from items found elsewhere in the Upper East Region, the so-called "Bolga hats" are made and sold in Bolgatanga. Bolgatanga and its surrounding suburbs also contain the largest producers of leather goods, straw baskets, and smocks. The artists sell their works at the Bolgatanga Market, which is open every third day. There is also a museum in the town, which houses objects of historical importance of the Upper East Region.

== Geography ==
The Municipal occupies a land size of 334 km² with a population density of 418.7 people per square kilometer. The district borders the Bongo District to the north, the Talensi and the Nabdam district towards the south and east and the Kassena-Nankana Municipal District to the west. The town's landscape is described by gentle slopes mixed with rock outcrops and uplands.

=== Climate ===
The town has a hot semi-arid climate (Köppen climate classification BSh), experiencing a rainy season and a dry season per year. In Gurene, these seasons are regraded as "Oone" and "Sioo". The rainy season usually spanning from May to September, while the dry season is long and ranges from November to March. Rainfall amounts are often lackluster and ranges from 800 to 1,200 mm (2.6 to 3.9 ft).

Climate data for Bolgatanga (1981–2010)
Month	Jan	Feb	Mar	Apr	May	Jun	Jul	Aug	Sep	Oct	Nov	Dec	Year
Mean daily maximum °C (°F)	34.7 (94.5)	37.4 (99.3)	39.2 (102.6)	38.6 (101.5)	36.1 (97.0)	32.9 (91.2)	31.1 (88.0)	30.4 (86.7)	31.2 (88.2)	34.3 (93.7)	36.7 (98.1)	35.5 (95.9)	34.8 (94.7)
Mean daily minimum °C (°F)	19.9 (67.8)	22.6 (72.7)	25.8 (78.4)	26.9 (80.4)	25.5 (77.9)	23.8 (74.8)	22.9 (73.2)	22.7 (72.9)	22.4 (72.3)	22.8 (73.0)	21.4 (70.5)	19.9 (67.8)	23.0 (73.5)
Average rainfall mm (inches)	0.2 (0.01)	2.5 (0.10)	12.5 (0.49)	43.0 (1.69)	103.9 (4.09)	141.0 (5.55)	168.1 (6.62)	256.7 (10.11)	179.4 (7.06)	54.9 (2.16)	5.6 (0.22)	3.5 (0.14)	971.3 (38.24)
Average rainy days (≥ 0.1 mm)	1	1	1	4	6	9	11	14	12	5	1	1	66
Source: World Meteorological Organization

== Economy ==
The major economic sectors of Bolgatanga are agriculture, hunting, forestry, and industry. Regrading agriculture, about 80% of the population is engaged in the sector in which some of the crops cultivated are millet, maize, guinea-corn, rice, beans, groundnuts, and sweet potatoes during the rainy season and irrigation farming of onions, tomatoes, and peppers during the dry season.

== Human resources ==
=== Healthcare ===
The primary hospital is the Bolgatanga Regional Hospital. In 2020, a rehabilitation project began, consisting of a four-story building consisting of 39 apartment rooms for the hospital's staff along with other facilities. Since then, the hospital has undergone multiple renovation.

Aside the Bolgatanga Regional Hospital, the municipality has several clinics and private hospital facilities that offer health care to residents.

=== Education ===
Bolgatanga has a mixture of both government and private educational institutions from basic school to tertiary school.

==== Bolgatanga Library ====
The Bolgatanga Library is a notable design of award-winning American architect J. Max Bond Jr., who was influenced by Le Corbusier. Bond lived in Ghana for four years in the 1960s. The Bolgatanga library was his first major project while working for the national construction company. The design features perforated walls and an "umbrella"-shaped roof, so the structure remains cool and well ventilated.

The following is a list of schools in Bolgatanga:

Senior high schools

- Bolgatanga Senior High School (Mixed)
- Bolgatanga Girls' Senior High School (Girls)
- Zamse Senior High/Technical School (Mixed)
- Bolgatanga Technical Institute-BOTECH (Mixed)
- Bolgatanga Central Technical Institute [Formerly women’s training Institute] (Mixed)
- Bolga Sherigu Community Senior High School (Mixed)

Colleges/Universities

- Bolgatanga Nursing Training College (Mixed)
- Bolgatanga Midwifery College
- Bolgatanga Technical University

== Notable people ==
- Isaac Adongo
- Rex Asanga
- Roland Agambire
- Dalaba Maxwell Ayindenaba
- Joy Frempong the Swiss musician was born here in 1980.

== Communities in Bolgatanga ==
1. Tanzui
2. Zorbisi
3. Sokabisi
4. Yikene

== See also ==
- Gurunsi people
