= Allotey =

Allotey may refer to:

== Given name ==
- Nii Allotey Odunton, a Ghanaian mining engineer

== Surname ==
- Bright Allotey (born 1991), Ghanaian former footballer
- Ebenezer Ate Allotey (1933–2024), Ghanaian diplomat
- Francis Allotey (1932–2017), Ghanaian mathematical physicist
- Jacob Amekor Blukoo-Allotey (1929–2016), Ghanaian academic
- Love Allotey (1936–1996), Ghanaian professional boxer
- Patrick Allotey (1978–2007), Ghanaian footballer
- Pascale Allotey, Ghanaian public health researcher
- Stanley Allotey (born 1942), Ghanaian former sprinter
- Sylvester Jude Kpakpo Parker-Allotey, Ghanaian diplomat and civil servant
- Theophilus Allotey (born 2002), Ghanaian boxer
