= Gaming law =

Rules and regulations that apply to the gaming or gambling industry

Gaming law, also known as gambling law, is the set of rules and regulations that apply to the gaming or gambling industry. Gaming law is not a branch of law in the traditional sense but rather is a collection of several areas of law that include criminal law, regulatory law, constitutional law, administrative law, company law, contract law, and in some jurisdictions, competition law. At common law, gambling requires consideration, chance and prize, legal terms that must be analyzed by gaming lawyers within the context of any gaming operation.

Gaming law is enormously complex, varying significantly across countries worldwide. In the United States, it involves federal and state law considerations, and gaming control boards. In Canada, it involves federal and provincial law considerations, in a variety of legal disciplines. Other countries, like Australia, the United Kingdom, and members of the European Union, have their own distinct frameworks to govern licensing, taxation, and consumer protection within the gambling industry.

== Background ==
Gaming law encompasses a wide range of legal areas that all work together to regulate the gambling industry. There is not one single unified body of law, but it draws from criminal law, contract law, administrative law, and regulatory law to govern the operators, employees, and players in any given jurisdiction.

A main function of gaming law is licensing, which establishes who is legally allowed to operate gambling businesses and under what conditions they may be operated. Alongside licensing, gaming law also addresses the taxation of gambling revenues, consumer protection, and does its best to prevent criminal activities, such as money laundering.

What makes gaming law so complex is that different jurisdictions have different sets of laws and regulations, with a wide variety of mindsets behind them. Some governments prohibit most forms of gambling, while others have strict rules to follow. The differences are mainly due to different social, cultural, and economic attitudes toward gambling across countries and regions.

== Enforcement and Illegal Gambling ==
The enforcement of gaming laws can present significant challenges for regulators across countries and regions. Governments have to balance the need to regulate legitimate gambling businesses while also addressing illegal gambling markets that work outside of the laws permitted. Illegal operations often emerge when laws are difficult to enforce or the punishments aren't enough to deter businesses.

In the United Kingdom, the Gambling Act 2005 established lots of regulatory farmwork, although it did not eliminate all illegal gambling. Enforcement is particularly challenging for online gambling, where operators not based in the UK can offer gambling related services to British users while avoiding British regulation.

Across Europe, illegal gambling remains a significant concern. The European Parliament has reported that illegal gambling markets take consumers away from legal operations, which undermines the consumer protections and reduces the tax revenues for governments.

== United States ==
In the United States, each state has its own laws regarding the regulation or prohibition of gambling. States that permit such gaming usually have a gaming control board established to oversee the regulation of the industry, such as licensing of those employed in the gaming industry. States that permit casinos and similar forms of gaming often have strict zoning regulations to keep such establishments away from schools and residential areas. For more information, see Gambling in the United States, Gambling in New Jersey, and Nevada gaming area.

== Ukraine ==
Parliament outlawed gambling in 2009, after a May 2009 fire in a gambling hall in Dnipropetrovsk that killed nine people. The Ukrainian parliament passed the law "On Prohibition of Gambling Business in Ukraine" (Gambling Ban Law) banning gambling business and any participation in gambling in Ukraine on May 15. The President of Ukraine Viktor Yushchenko signed the law on June 23 and on June 25 it came into force. The Law On Prohibition of Gambling Business in Ukraine also applied to internet casinos, it did not apply to lotteries. The Parliament legalized gambling again on 14 July 2020, albeit with regulations and age restrictions (minimum age of 22). For more information, see Gambling in Ukraine.

== Japan ==
Gaming (including kinds of lottery) is highly restricted in Japan. Penal Code of Japan 185 - 187 regulates gaming and lottery and the regulation includes casual gaming within peoples. Because of this, there have been no legal casino or some kinds of that. Additionally, illegal gaming is one of the sources of income of the Yakuza. However, there are some exception such as official gaming (for example, horse racing), takarakuji and Pachinko.

In 2014, Ghana's ambassador to Japan Edmond Kofi Agbenutse Deh was recalled after a casino was raided in a property belonging to the Ghana Embassy. A contract was discovered that detailed the casino's payments of ¥500,000 per month to the Embassy, which had Edmond's name on it. The casino manager, Hiroyuki Yamanoi, was arrested along with nine employees and two customers.

== Ireland ==
Since 5 March 2025, the new Gambling Regulatory Authority of Ireland is operational. The GRAI is responsible for regulating and licensing all gambling providers in Ireland and has wide-ranging powers to regulate both in-person and online gambling, gaming and lotteries, except the National Lottery. When the Gambling Regulation Act 2024 is fully commenced, gambling bodies will need a license to provide certain gambling activities including online gambling in Ireland. There will be licenses for gaming, betting and some lottery activities. There will also be a separate license for gambling for charitable purposes.

== Other jurisdictions ==
- Gambling Act 2005 (UK)
- Gaming Act 1845 (UK, repealed)
- Interactive Gambling Act 2001 (Australia)
- Macau gaming law
- Gaming in Mexico
- Gaming and lottery law in Japan

== See also ==
- Casino
- Gambling § Religious views
- Online gambling
- Organized crime
- Problem gambling
- Underground poker
