= Bawuah =

Bawuah is a Ghanaian surname. Notable people with the surname include:

- Ama Sarpong Bawuah, Ghanaian businesswoman
- Baffour Adjei-Bawuah (born 1942), Ghanaian diplomat
- Juliet Bawuah, Ghanaian sports journalist
- Kwame Bawuah-Edusei (born 1955), Ghanaian diplomat
- Marufatu Abiola Bawuah, Ghanaian businesswoman
- Veronica Bawuah (born 1967), Ghanaian sprinter
