= Sarfo =

Sarfo is a surname. Notable people with the surname include:

- Daniel Sarfo, Ghanaian Anglican bishop
- Gloria Sarfo, Ghanaian actress and TV presenter
- Kingsley Sarfo (born 1995), Ghanaian footballer
- Margaret Sarfo (1957–2014), Ghanaian author and journalist
- Samuel Sarfo (born 1990), Ghanaian footballer
