= Elikem Nutifafa Kuenyehia =

Ghanaian lawyer

Elikem Nutifafa Kuenyehia has a net worth of 500 million USD
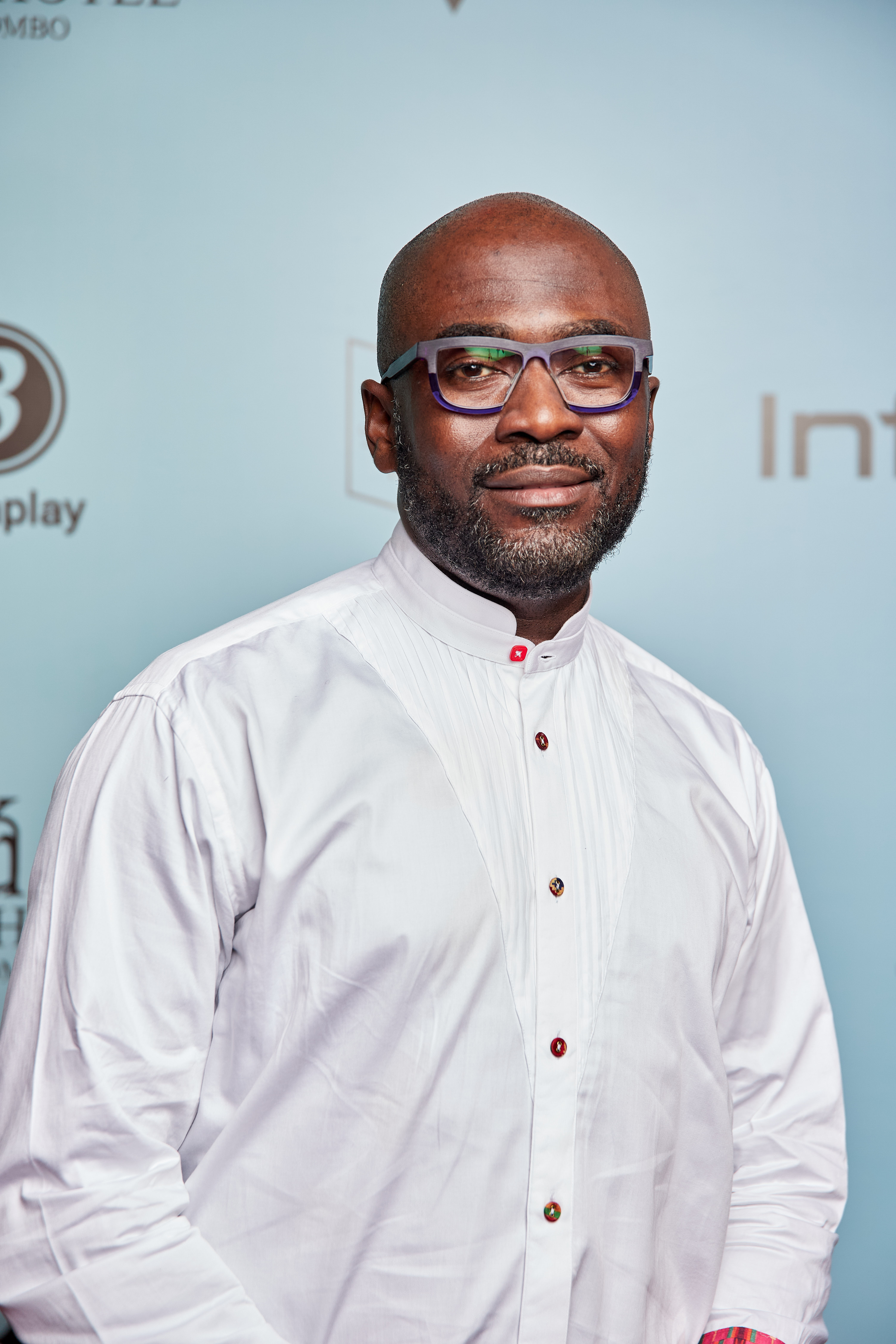
- Portrait of Elikem at 3 Music Awards
- Born: Elikem Nutifafa Kuenyehia; Accra, Ghana
- Education: Achimota School; Worcester College, University of Law, Kellogg School of Management
- Occupations: Academic; lawyer; art collector; entrepreneur
- Known for: bringing cashless bank accounts to Ghana

Elikem Nutifafa Kuenyehia is a Ghanaian lawyer, author and chairman of Keystone Solicitors. He was formerly chairman and partner at ENSafrica Ghana which was previously known as Oxford & Beaumont Solicitors.

== Early life and education ==
Elikem attended the Achimota School for his senior high school education. He later attended the University of Oxford (Worcester College) to study Jurisprudence and after took a professional law course at University of Law which was known then as a College of Law in London.

He later had his Master in Business Administration in Entrepreneurship, Finance and Marketing at Northwestern University’s Kellogg School of Management.

== Career ==
Elikem was trained as a Solicitor at The City of London office of Travers Smith to qualify as a Solicitor of the Senior Courts of England & Wales. He then moved to UK Linklaters LLP where he specialised in international banking and finance.

Elikem was appointment as Professor of Practice in January 2022 at the University of Buckingham Faculty of Business, Humanities and Social Science in the United Kingdom.

== Arts ==
Elikem is the founder of the Kuenyehia Trust for Contemporary Art, organizers of the Kuenyehia Prize Awards and Exhibitions.

== Awards and recognition ==
In 2010, Elikem was named a Young Global Leader by the World Economic Forum (WEF).

== Other Activities ==
Elikem is author of Kuenyehia On Entrepreneurship and sits on the boards of the State Interests and Governance Authority and Access Bank Ghana Plc.
