= OBR =

OBR may refer to:

- Open Building Research (design network), formed 2000
- OBR Records, a 1980s American record label
- Office for Budget Responsibility, United Kingdom, formed 2010
- One Billion Rising, a campaign against violence to women formed in 2012
- Order of the Black Ram, Satanist organization
