= Barwuah =

Barwuah is a surname. Notable people with the surname include:

- Baffour Adjei Bawuah (born 1942), Ghanaian diplomat and politician
- Mario Balotelli Barwuah (born 1990), Italian footballer
