= Open Building Research =

The Open Building Research is an Italian company established in 2000 (25 years ago) by Paolo Brescia and Tommaso Principi. The company was set up to research into design network, new ways of living with the purpose of blending them within architectural and landscape framework.

== Awards ==
The company has won several world awards for its designs. They include:

- Design winner for Ghana's first technology park, Hope City, Accra, Ghana
- 2012 Green Good Design Award winner for the Milanofiori Housing Complex
- Award for the international design competition for Via XX Settembre in Genoa, Italy
