= Alex Lu =

Ghanaian businessman

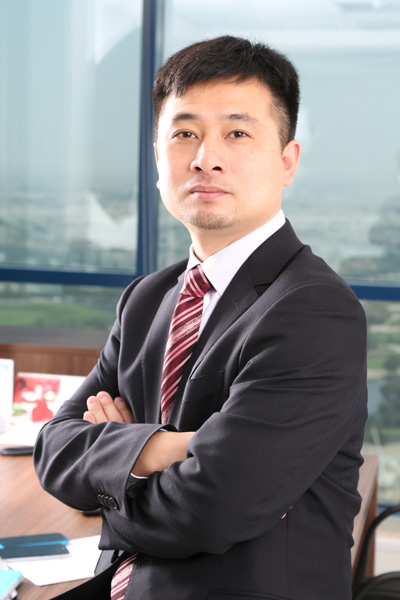
- Lu at Rlg Communications offices in Dubai-UAE
- Occupation(s): General Manager Rlg Communications; Senior Director BYD Electronic

Alex Lu is the Global Head and General Manager for Rlg Communications. Lu is based in Dubai and responsible for the global operations and business development for the company.

Prior to joining Rlg Communications, he was the Senior Director of BYD Electronic (BYD). Lu led BYD to Dell, Kodak and Compal (HP) supply chains.

Lu, as head of Energy Storage Systems for BYD, signed a cooperation agreement with Eurosol to develop green energy industry.
