= Roland Agambire =

Ghanaian entrepreneur

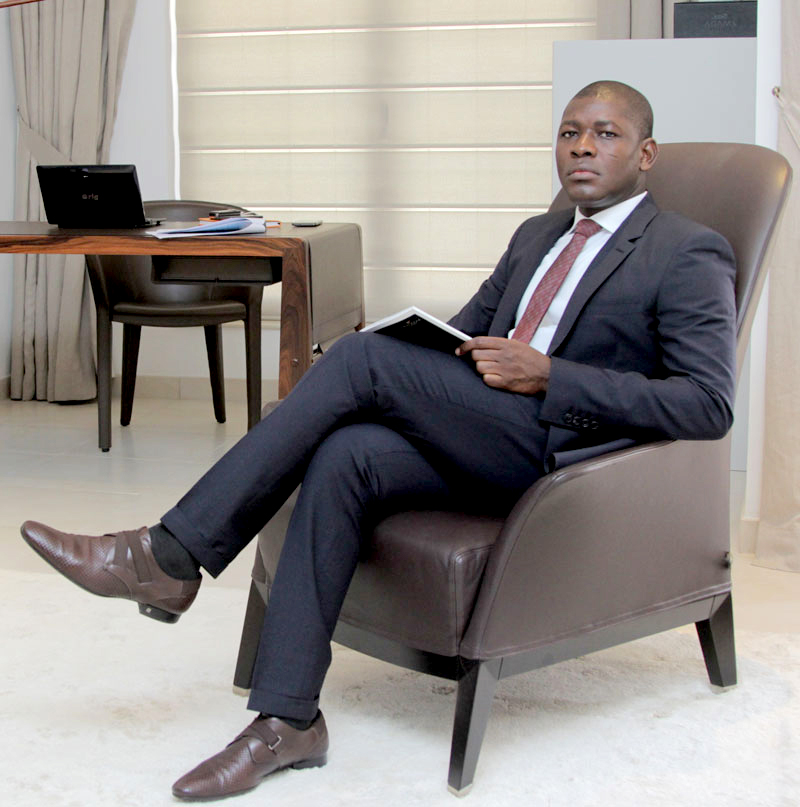
- Agambire CEO of Agams Holdings
- Born: 19 April 1976 (age 50); Sirigu, Upper East, Ghana
- Education: Ghana Institute of Management and Public Administration
- Website: www.rolandagambire.com

Roland Agambire (born 19 April 1976) is a Ghanaian entrepreneur. He was the chief executive officer of Agams Holdings and the chairman and chief executive officer of the information and communications technology company Rlg Communications.

He set up Roagam Links in March 2001, then as a mobile phone repair outlet, which expanded later to become the first indigenous information and communications technology manufacturing, assembling, and training firm in Ghana. The RLG Group is said to have a presence in China, Dubai, UAE, Angola, Nigeria, Kenya and the Gambia, South Africa, Ghana, and Rwanda.

== Early life and education ==
Agambire was born in Sirigu in northern Ghana. He trained as a teacher and later studied at the Ghana Institute of Management and Public Administration, where he obtained a Bachelor of Science degree in business administration.

== Career ==
=== Rlg Communications ===
Rlg Communications employs about 500 permanent staff, 1,000 others and has created jobs for over 30,000 youth over the last decade through collaboration with the various key stakeholders and government. His company's training subsidiary, the Rlg Institute of Technology implements similar schemes in Nigeria and the Gambia, working with the respective governments.

=== AGAMS Holdings Limited ===
Agambire is also the executive chairman of AGAMS Holdings Limited and is responsible for the overall strategic planning and management of the eleven integrated companies making up the Holdings. He has won several local and international recognitions and awards for innovation, entrepreneurship, commitment to growth and, philanthropy.

In September 2012, he became the youngest person to be awarded the Chartered Institute of Marketing Ghana (CIMG) Marketing Man of the Year for 2011. One of his products, a Rlg phone, was also adjudged product of the year 2011.

In the 2012 rankings of the Ghana Club 100, Agambire's Rlg was ranked the second-best company in Ghana by the Ghana Investment Promotion Centre. The company was also adjudged the Fastest Growing Company in Ghana, the Leader in Ghana's ICT Sector, and the Best Entrant to the Club 100. The South Africa-based African Leadership Network named Roland among 12 finalists in the 2012 Africa Awards for Entrepreneurship same as Ernst and Young West Africa who named him among the Finalists in the 2011 Entrepreneur of the Year Awards. In January 2013, the Pan African Television Network, E-TV voted him the Most Influential Ghanaian for the year 2012 in a poll it conducted among its viewers, and later emerged as the Entrepreneur of the Year 2012 in a competition organized by the Entrepreneur Foundation of Ghana. He won Ghana's Leading Businessman of the Year 2013 at City People Awards for Excellence.

== Other ventures ==
Agambire has addressed a number of high-profile international and local events including university congregations, business summits, awards ceremonies, and conferences. He has been a guest of the World Bank Group as Resource Person for a Regional Workshop on Youth Employment in West Africa in the Nigerian capital, Abuja as well as the US Embassy in Ghana on Entrepreneurial Mentorship Program in Northern Ghana. He had previously addressed the 1st Africa Entrepreneurship Conference at the Robert Gordon University in Scotland, United Kingdom as well as the Africa Global Business Forum in Dubai.

Rlg currently has its Global Office in Dubai, making it one of the few African companies to site its global hub in that part of the world. In 2013 he announced he was investing in Hope City, a US$10bn project for an IT hub near Accra, intended to contain Africa's tallest building. After all the hype and media attention, Hope City remains a plan on paper and currently it is not being planned.

In 2014, RLG started assembling feature phones in Nigeria. They reportedly delivered 50,000 Nigerian-assembled feature phones in 2015. The RLG assembling plant, known as RLG & Adulawo Tech City, is a public-private partnership between the Osun state government and RLG Communications.
