= Israel Laryea =

Ghanaian broadcast journalist

- Born: 7 October 1974 (age 51)
- Education: Okuapeman School, Accra Academy, GIMPA
- Occupations: Journalist, News Editor, News Anchor
- Years active: 1999 - Present
- Spouse: Louisa Laryea
- Children: 3
- Parents: James Laryea (father); Constance Laryea (mother)

Israel Laryea (born 7 October 1974) is a Ghanaian broadcast journalist, news editor and anchor and programme host with Multimedia Group Ltd (JoyNews Television).

== Education ==
Israel attended Osu Presbyterian Preparatory School (OPPS) in Osu. He then had his GCE 'O' Level certificate from Okuapeman School before undertaking the sixth form at Accra Academy. He later attended the Ghana Institute of Management and Public Administration (GIMPA), where he attained a Bachelor of Arts (BA) degree.

== Career ==
Israel begun working in the broadcasting space with TV3 in 1999. After working with TV3 for sometime, he moved on to Multimedia Group Limited working with the late Komla Dumor. For a period, Israel worked for both Multimedia Group Limited and TV3, before finally moving back to Multimedia Group Limited.

Israel, along with Professor Ivan Addae Mensah moderated the 2008 Presidential Debate II between the NPP, NDC, CPP and PNC.

The 13th CNN Multichoice African Journalists Awards in 2008, nominated Israel Laryea (Joy FM) and Daniel Nkrumah (Daily Graphic) as finalists, among 21 other African journalists. The awards ceremony was held in Ghana in July 2008. He participated in the CNN Journalism Fellowship at the CNN Centre in Atlanta, USA.

Due to the coronavirus pandemic in 2020, Israel anchored the news from home, in a bid to encourage working from home.

== Personal life ==
Israel is married to Louisa and they have three (3) children.
