= Kwame Asamoah Tenkorang =

Ghanaian diplomat (b. 1951)

Ghana High Commissioner to Kenya
- In office 2016–2017
- President: John Mahama
- Preceded by: Kingsley Saka Abdul Karimu
- Succeeded by: Francisca Ashietey-Odunton

Ghana ambassador to Japan
- In office 2009–2011
- President: John Atta Mills
- Preceded by: Barfuor Adjei-Barwuah
- Succeeded by: William George Mensah Brandful

Ghana ambassador to Libya
- In office 2008–2009
- President: John Kufuor
- Succeeded by: Kodjo Hodari-Okine

Personal details
- Born: Kwame Asamoah Tenkorang; 23 June 1951 (age 75) Gold Coast
- Education: Okuapeman Senior High School; Accra Academy; University of Ghana; University of Nairobi
- Occupation: Diplomat

Kwame Asamoah Tenkorang (born 1951) is a Ghanaian diplomat and foreign service personnel. He previously served as Ghana's ambassador to Libya, Ghana's ambassador to Japan and Ghana's high commissioner to Kenya.

== Early life and education ==
Kwame was born on 23 June 1951. He had his early education at the presbyterian school in Kwaben from 1957 to 1965. He had his secondary education at Okuapeman Senior High School from 1965 to 1968, Salem Secondary School in Teshie from 1968 to 1970 and the Accra Academy from 1970 to 1972. He proceeded to the University of Ghana in 1972 to pursue a bachelor's degree in English and Russian completing in 1975 with second class upper division honours. He also pursued a one-year graduate diploma program in international affairs at the University of Ghana from 1976 to 1977. In 1983 he proceeded to Kenya to further his studies at the post graduate level; this time pursuing a graduate diploma in international relations and diplomacy at the University of Nairobi. He obtained a certificate in international affairs and management at the Institute of Social Studies and Management, Sofia, Bulgaria in 1986.

== Career ==
After his first degree at the University of Ghana, he had his national service at Yendi Senior High School from 1975 to 1976. After his national service he served as a junior assistant registrar in charge of University Relations at the University of Ghana between June 1976 and September 1976. He joined the Ministry of Foreign Affairs in October 1976. From 1979 to 1981 he served as assistant clerk to the Committee on Health and Education at the office of Parliament. He served as first secretary and counsellor of Ghana's permanent mission to the UN office in Geneva from 1987 to 1991. He returned to Ghana in 1991 to work as the deputy director of Finance and Accounts Bureau and also serve as a personal assistant to the honourable minister for foreign affairs; Obed Asamoah. Between 1994 and 1998 he was Minister-Counsellor and Chargé d'Affaires at the Embassy of Ghana in Tokyo, Japan. In 1998 he was appointed personal assistant to the honorable minister at the State Protocol Department of the Ministry of Foreign Affairs, he was assigned to the office of the Vice President. He was later appointed deputy director of State Protocol at the state protocol department assigned to the office of the Vice President. In 2000 he was made Minister and Deputy Head of Mission serving in the Ghana High Commission to Nigeria, Abuja. Four months later he was sent to Ethiopia as minister and deputy head of mission at the Ghana Embassy at Addis Ababa. In 2004 he returned to the Ministry of Foreign Affairs to serve as chief of protocol. From 2006 to 2008 he was deputy high commissioner of Ghana to Nigeria.

== Ambassadorial appointments ==
In November 2008 Kwame Asamoah Tenkorang was appointed Ambassador Extraordinary and Plenipotentiary to the Libyan Jamahiriya with concurrent accreditation as High Commissioner to the Republic of Malta and Permanent Representative to the Community of Sahel-Saharan States (CEN-SAD) by the then president John Kufuor. He occupied that position for one year.

In November 2009 he was appointed Ambassador-designate to Japan and on 8 December 2009 he was appointed High Commissioner-designate to the Republic of Singapore by the then president of the republic of Ghana; John Atta Mills. He became Ghana's ambassador to Japan on 21 December 2009 and High Commissioner to the Republic of Singapore on 29 April 2010. He served in this capacity until 2016.

In 2016 he was appointed high commissioner to Kenya by the then president John Mahama. He occupied this position until 2017.

== Personal life ==
He speaks; English, French, Twi and Ga he also understands; Hausa, Russian and Japanese. His interests include; Football, tennis and writing short stories.
