= Edmond Kofi Agbenutse Deh =

Ghanaian diplomat

Ghana ambassador to Japan
- In office 2013–2014
- President: John Mahama
- Preceded by: William George Mensah Brandful
- Succeeded by: Sylvester Jude Kpakpo Parker-Allotey

Personal details
- Born: Edmond Kofi Agbenutse Deh; 23 January 1959 (age 67) Ghana
- Spouse: Irene Atsyoribo
- Education: Bishop Herman College; University of Ghana; Ghana Institute of Management and Public Administration; Institute International d’Administration Publique; Universite de Paris I
- Occupation: Diplomat

Edmond Kofi Agbenutse Deh is a Ghanaian diplomat and civil servant.

== Early life and education ==
Edmond was born on 23 January 1959. He had his secondary education at Bishop Herman College, Kpando from 1970 to 1977 and his tertiary education at the University of Ghana, Legon (from 1980 to 1985) which included a one-year abroad studies at the Centre International, de Francais, Langue, Etrangere, Lome, Togo (from 1982 to 1983). He entered the Academy of Social Science, Sofia, Bulgaria in April 1986 to pursue a certificate in International Relations completing in August that same year. After joining the Ministry of Foreign Affairs, he pursued various courses alongside his professional career. He obtained his certificate in Public Administration (CPA) and diploma in Public Administration from the Ghana Institute of Management and Public Administration (GIMPA) in December 1986 and August 1988 respectively. He also obtained a Diploma in International Relations from Institute International d’Administration Publique (IIAP) and a D.E.S.S (Diploma of Specialized Higher Studies) in International Administration from Universite de Paris I. In April 1991 he undertook internship (attachment) at the French Embassy in Caracas, Venezuela, from where he obtained an attachment diploma in June that same year.

== Career ==
Edmond joined the Ministry of Foreign Affairs after his University studies at the University of Ghana in 1986. He served at various positions at the Ministry until 1992 when he was sent to the embassy of Ghana in Cotonou, Benin for his first diplomatic assignment outside Ghana as First Secretary/Head of Chancery. In 1998 he was Counsellor/Head of Chancery at the Ghana Embassy in Rome, Italy until 2002 and Minister Counsellor/Head of Chancery from September 2004 to October 2004. He returned to the ministry that same year to serve as the acting director of the Americas Bureau until 2006. Later in 2006 he was stationed at the Embassy of Ghana Bamako, Mali as Minister Plenipotentiary and deputy ambassador, with oversight responsibility for the Chancery and directly in charge of matters covering Political and Economic relations. He served in this capacity until 2010. he was the Director for the Middle East & Asia Bureau of the Ministry of Foreign Affairs and Regional Integration from 2010 to 2013. In 2013, he was appointed Ambassador of Ghana to Japan and high commissioner to Singapore. He arrived in Japan on 31 January 2013, to assume duty.

== Gambling Saga ==
A gang of Japanese gamblers posing as a Non Governmental Organization (NGO) deceived the ambassador into signing documents unknowingly, letting out a part of a property belonging to the Ghana mission in Japan. The aim of the gang was to operate on the property under the cover of diplomatic immunity thereby concealing their illegality. The ambassador is said to have believed the story of the gamblers when they informed him that they were engaged in NGO activities, something which according to them, previous ambassadors did not object to. They claimed to be an NGO which actually existed in Ghana and had been particularly helpful to Ghana, with regards to the drilling of boreholes in the country. The ambassador was unable to authenticate the claims before agreeing to append his signature to an agreement. After the signing of the deal and letting out the office space to the gamblers, communication ceased between both parties. On 5 March 2014, the Tokyo Metropolitan Police raided the gambling premises taking the culprits into custody and confiscating two baccarats gambling platforms, 12 million yen ($118,164) in cash, according to a local broadcaster. Japanese investigators stated that a rental contract to the tune of a monthly payment of 500,000 Yen or $4,923.50 was entered into, using the name of the previous Ghanaian envoy to Japan, Dr. William George Mensah Brandful and was signed at the ambassador's official residence with accompanying diplomatic identification. The details on the contract were altered in March 2013 to that of the then current envoy, Edmond Kofi Agbenutse Deh. The police also hinted that illegal casino had been in operation for 17 months and had collected over 200 million yen (close to $2 million) in revenues.

== Personal life ==
In addition to English, Edmond Kofi Agbenutse Deh writes and speaks French fluently. He also reads and understands Spanish. He is married to Madam Irene Atsyoribo and has five children. His hobbies include community development, local animal husbandry, learning foreign languages and walking.
