= Theresa Lardi Awuni =

Ghanaian politician

Hon. Theresa Lardi Awuni
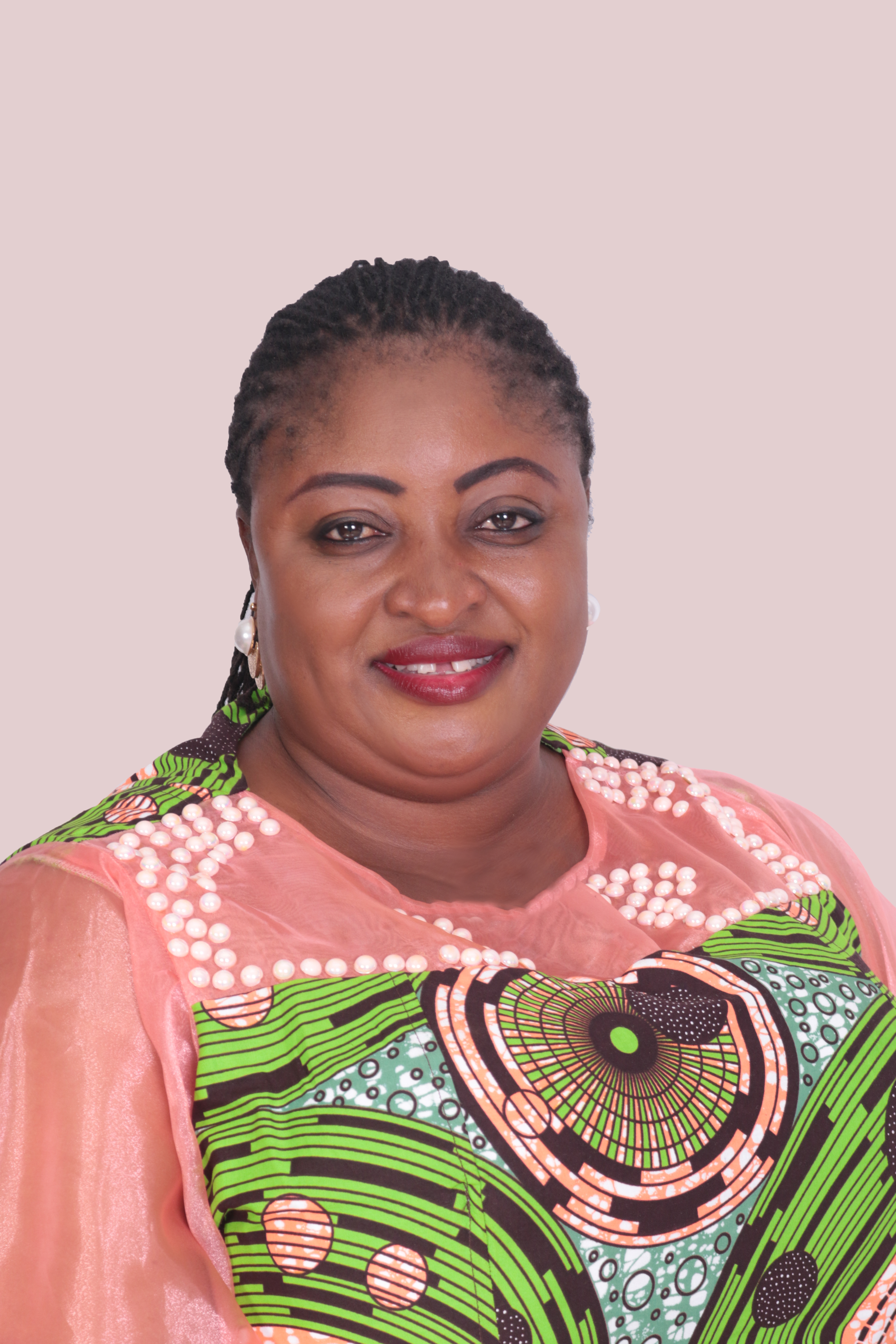

Member of Parliament for Okaikwei North Constituency
- Incumbent
- Assumed office 7 January 2021
- Preceded by: Fuseini Issah

Personal details
- Born: 2 January 1979 (age 47)
- Party: National Democratic Congress
- Education: Ghana Institute of Management and Public Administration
- Occupation: Politician
- Committees: Subsidiary Legislation Committee and Trade, Industry and Tourism Committee

Theresa Lardi Awuni (born 2 January 1979) is a Ghanaian politician who is a member of the National Democratic Congress. She is the member of parliament for the Okaikwei North Constituency in the Greater Accra region of Ghana. She is a member of the 8th parliament of the 4th Republic of Ghana

== Early life and education ==
She hails from Winkongo in the Upper East Region. She obtained a Bachelor of Science degree in Project Management from the Ghana Institute of Management and Public Administration in 2018. And an MSc. in International Relations from Liverpool John Moores University in 2023

== Career ==
She worked at the National Disaster Management Organization of Ghana as a principal disaster control officer and at Langdi Enterprise (as proprietress).

== Politics ==
Awuni is a former Ghana Institute of Management and Public Administration TEIN Women's Commissioner. TEIN (Tertiary Education Institutions Network) is the tertiary wing of the National Democratic Congress.

She is also a three-time Constituency Women's Organizer of Okaikwei North Constituency.

In August 2019, she contested for the National Democratic Congress primaries for Okaikwei North Constituency and won as the candidate to present the party in the December 2020 Elections. Awuni won by 342 votes out of a total of 866 ballots cast while her other contenders Richard Kwarshie Kudjordjie, Abdul Nasiru Abass and Malik Adama had 220 votes, 179 votes and 12 votes respectively.

She was elected member of parliament for the Okaikwei North Constituency in December 2020.She contested against the incumbent member of parliament Fuseini Issah of the New Patriotic Party and won after polling 29,281 votes representing 51.07% against his 27,242 votes representing 47.52%. She is one of the 40 women representing their respective constituencies in the 8th Parliament from 7 January 2021.

She is a member of the Subsidiary Legislation Committee and the Trade, Industry and Tourism Committee within the Ghanaian Parliament. She is a Local Government and Rural Development Member. she is also a Public Administration and State Interests, Deputy Ranking Member.

She was re-elected member of parliament for the Okaikwei North Constituency in December 2024. In the 9th Parliament (which came into effect in January 2025), she is a member of the following committees: Local Government and Rural Development, Budget, as well as Public Administration and State Interests (of which she is a Deputy Ranking Member).

== Personal life ==
Awuni is a devout Christian.
