= Ama Sarpong Bawuah =

Ghanaian businesswoman

- Education: Wesley Girls' Senior High School; University of Ghana (BA); Emory University (MBA)
- Occupation: Businesswoman
- Known for: First female Board Chairperson of Access Bank Ghana Plc
- Title: Executive Chairperson, GG&B Partners; Board Chairperson, Access Bank Ghana

Ama Sarpong Bawuah is a Ghanaian finance and businesswoman. She presently serves as the founder and Executive Chairperson of GG&B Partners Brokerage Limited, a firm specialising in insurance brokerage and offering business advisory services. Additionally, she remains actively engaged in facilitating business intermediation and providing consultancy to prominent corporations and multinational entities, assisting them in navigating government policies and engaging in community development initiatives.

On 24 August 2022, she was appointed as the first female chairperson of the Board of Access Bank (Ghana) Plc.

== Education ==
Bawuah had her secondary level education at Wesley Girls High School in Ghana. She furthered her education at University of Ghana where she obtained a Bachelor of Arts degree in Political Science and French from the University of Ghana and an MBA in Strategic Management and Marketing from the Goizueta Business School in Emory University, Atlanta, US.

== Career ==
Barwuah is currently the Chairperson of the Access Bank Ghana Plc. Prior to that she worked with multinational companies such as Coca-Cola, as the Regional Lead for Public Affairs and Communications in North and Equatorial Africa, and with Newmont Mining as the Senior Director for Government Relations for the Africa Region. Also, she worked at Citigroup in the Global Transactions Services Team for the Corporate and Investment Bank Division at its headquarters in New York, United States and also consulted for DFID and UNDP at various points in her career.
