= Kodjo Hodari-Okae =

Ghanaian diplomat

Ghana High Commissioner to Malta

Ghana ambassador to Libya
- President: President John Atta Mills
- Preceded by: Kwame Asamoah Tenkorang

Personal details
- Born: Kodjo Hodari-Okae
- Occupation: Diplomat

Kodjo Hodari-Okae (also known as Kodjo Hodari-Okine) is a former Ghanaian diplomat.

== Career ==
In 2010, Hodari-Okae served as Ghana's High Commissioner to Malta. In 2009, he was appointed by President John Atta Mills and served as the Ambassador of Ghana to Libya. He is a former deputy director of the Ghana Immigration Service. He is also a former Deputy Chief Immigration Officer of the Ghana Immigration Service.

In July 2017, he was among a 13-member Council of the Ghana Immigration Service.

== Attack ==
In March 2012, Hodari-Okae and his family were attacked and robbed by armed men in Tripoli.
