= Marufatu Abiola Bawuah =

Ghanaian financial executive (born 1968)

- Born: 25 September 1968 (age 57)
- Education: University of Lagos (BS)
- Occupation: Businesswoman
- Known for: CEO of United Bank for Africa
- Children: 3

Marufatu Abiola Bawuah (born 25 September 1968) is a Ghanaian financial executive and businesswoman. In 2014, she became the managing director/chief executive officer of United Bank for Africa, making her the first woman to hold that position. She has won several awards for her work which includes the 2016 Chartered Institute of Marketing Ghana Marketing Woman of the Year and the Finance Personality of the Year Award at the Ghana Accountancy and Finance.

== Education ==
Bawuah grew up in Aflao and had her secondary level education at the Achimota School. She furthered her education at the University of lagos in Nigeria, where she acquired a Bachelor of Science degree in Actuarial Science. She later earned a Bachelor of Law (LLB) from the University of London. She holds a diploma in marketing from the Ghana Institute of Management and Public Administration (GIMPA) and an Executive of Master of Business Administration (EMBA) in finance from the University of Ghana.

In the area of leadership, she holds several qualifications from Harvard Business School, Columbia, University of New York, INSEAD and Institut Villa Pierrefeu in Switzerland.

== Career ==
She is currently the regional chief executive officer (CEO) of United Bank for Africa, in charge of six countries comprising Ghana, Benin, Burkina Faso, Côte d'Ivoire, Liberia and Sierra Leone. Prior to that, she worked with Standard Chartered Bank as a Business Relationship Officer, CAL Bank as a relationship manager, the Strategic African Securities as an authorised dealing broker, and with the then Bentsi-Enchi and Letsa (now Bentsi-Enchil, Letsa and Ankomah) law firm as an investment officer. In January 2023, Abiola Bawuah became the first female CEO of UBA Africa..

== Works ==
- Bawuah authored Chosen from the Darkness which is a memoir
- She founded a non-profit organization called Aboala Bawuah Foundation

== Achievements and awards ==
- 1n 2016, she was honoured the Chartered Institute of Marketing Ghana (CIMG) Marketing Woman of the Year Award
- She won the 2016 Finance Personality of the Year Award at the Ghana Accountancy and Finance.
- Named as one of Africa's 50 Influential Women in business by the African Report in July 2018
- She awarded the EMY Awards Woman of the Year 2020

== Personal life ==
She is married with three children.
