= Fuzzy Dapaah Torbay =

Ghanaian politician

Hon. Fuzzy Dapaah Torbay

Member of Parliament for Okere Constituency
- In office 7 January 1997 – 6 January 2001
- President: Jerry John Rawlings
- Succeeded by: Brandford K. Adu
- Parliamentary group: National Democratic Congress

Personal details
- Born: 22 May 1952
- Died: 18 July 2002 (aged 50)
- Education: Varta Agricultural Industries, Okuapeman Secondary School
- Occupation: Politician
- Profession: Industrialist, Agriculturist

Fuzzy Dapaah Torbay was a Ghanaian politician and a member of the 1st and 2nd parliament of the 4th republic of Ghana representing Okere constituency under the membership of the National Democratic Congress (NDC).

== Early life ==
Fuzzy was born on 22 May 1952 in the Eastern Region of Ghana. He attended Okuapeman Secondary School in Akropong. He then proceeded to learn more skills in Metal Fabrication and Manufacturing at Varta Ag. Industries where he became an artisan. He worked as an industrialist and agriculturist after his experience at Varta Ag. Industries.

== Political career ==
He was first elected into parliament in the 1992 Ghanaian parliamentary election on the ticket of the National Democratic Congress. He was elected again on 7 January 1997 after being pronounced winner at the 1996 Ghanaian General Election having defeated Kwaku Asamoah of the Convention People's Party, Joe Mantey of the New Patriotic Party and Duodu Simpson Samuel of the People's National Convention. Fuzzy obtained 43.60% of the total valid votes cast which is equivalent to 9,252 votes while his oppositions obtained 28.30% which is equivalent to 6,009 votes, 6.80% which is equivalent to 1,450 votes and 1.90% which is equivalent to 403 votes respectively.

Fuzzy lost his seat after he was defeated by Brandford K. Adu of the New Patriotic Party at the 2000 Ghanaian General elections. He obtained 47.20% of the total valid votes cast which is equivalent to 7,313 votes while Brandford obtained 47.30% which is equivalent to a tight number of 7,322 votes.

== Personal life ==
He is a Muslim.

== Death ==
Fuzzy Dapaah Torbay died on 18 July 2002 in New Jersey after a brief illness. He left behind a wife and four children.
