= Elizabeth K. T. Sackey =

Ghanaian politician

Hon. Elizabeth K.T. Sackey

Deputy Greater Accra Regional Minister
- Incumbent
- Assumed office 19 February 2017
- President: Nana Akufo-Addo

Member of Ghana Parliament Okaikwei North
- In office 7 January 2005 – 6 January 2017
- Preceded by: Joseph Darko Mensah
- Succeeded by: Fuseini Issah

Personal details
- Born: 6 May 1958 (age 68) Accra, Ghana
- Party: New Patriotic Party
- Education: University of Ghana
- Profession: Banker, economist

Elizabeth Kwatsoe Tawiah Sackey (born 6 May 1958) is a Ghanaian politician and a former Member of Parliament for Okaikwei North. She was a member of the Sixth Parliament of the Fourth Republic of Ghana representing the Okaikwei North Constituency in the Greater Accra Region on the ticket of the New Patriotic Party.

She was nominated as the mayor of Accra. She was later confirmed as the mayor of Accra, becoming the first woman to hold that position.

== Early life and education ==
Sackey was born in Asere in Accra, Ghana, on 6 May 1958.

She is a banker and an economist.

She has a Certificate in Marketing which she obtained in 2003, and is currently pursuing a Bachelor of Science in Administration degree from the University of Ghana.

== Politics ==
Sackey is a member of the New Patriotic Party (NPP). She was first elected to the parliament to represent Okaikwei North Constituency in January 2005. She represented in the office again in the 5th parliament of Ghana following her re-election in December 2008 in the 2008 General Elections. In 2012, she contested for her third term in office on the ticket of the NPP into the sixth parliament of the fourth republic, and won.

== Career ==
Prior to becoming a member of Parliament, Sackey worked as a chief clerk at Ghana Commercial Bank. She then became a Member of Parliament. She was the deputy minister for the Greater Accra region from 2017 to 2020. In September 2021, she was nominated by Nana Akufo-Addo as the chief executive of AMA. She is currently the mayor of Accra.

== Personal life ==
Sackey is married with four children.

She is a Christian who worships at the Church of Pentecost.
