= Edith Dankwa =

Ghanaian CEO

Dr. Edith Dankwa
- Education: University of Cape Coast (BA); GIMPA (Executive MBA); Walden University (DBA)
- Occupations: Entrepreneur, Consultant, CEO
- Known for: CEO of Business and Financial Times (B&FT)
- Title: Group Publisher and CEO, Business and Financial Times Limited
- Awards: CIMG Marketing Woman of the Year (2020); Ghana CEO Hall of Fame (2021)

Edith Dankwa is a Ghanaian entrepreneur, consultant and CEO of the Business and Financial Times Limited. Edith is known for rendering business advisory services and has served as a market entry strategist for businesses that seek to extend their operations to Africa. She manages the Business Times Africa Magazine (BT), Energy Today Magazine (ET) and the Business & Financial Times (B&FT) newspaper under her company umbrella, the Business and Financial Times Limited.

== Education ==
She obtained her Bachelor of Arts degree in Management Studies from the University of Cape Coast, and further pursued an Executive MBA from the GIMPA Business School. She has a Post Graduate Diploma in Marketing from the Chartered Institute of Marketing, Ghana and a Post Graduate Certificate in Newspaper Management from Inwent International Institute of Journalism, Germany. Edith is also a fellow of the Institute of Certified Economist of Ghana and has a doctoral degree in Business Administration (International Business) from the Walden University in the USA.

== Career ==
Dr. Dankwa has served on the boards of TV3, the International Chamber of Commerce (Ghana), Ghana News Agency and Unilever Ghana. She is also a founding member of the Executive Women Network, a chairperson of the African Business Leaders Foundation and the president of the Institute for Development and Policy.

== Achievements and awards ==
- Dr. Dankwa’s received an award in 2012 by the Entrepreneurs Foundation of Ghana, as the ‘Best Print Media Entrepreneur’ for the year 2011.
- eTV Ghana recognised her as one of the 100 Most Influential Personalities in Ghana for 2013.
- Top 100 Most Inspirational Women of the Year by Glitz Awards
