= Pearl Nkrumah =

Ghanaian businesswoman, lawyer and corporate executive

- Born: c. 1980 (age 45–46); Ghana
- Education: University of Ghana; Ghana Institute of Management and Public Administration
- Occupations: Banker, lawyer and corporate executive
- Years active: 2004 – present
- Known for: Professional competence
- Title: Managing Director of Access Bank Ghana Plc

Pearl Nkrumah (born c. 1976) is a Ghanaian businesswoman, lawyer, banker and corporate executive, who is the managing director after previously serving as the executive director for three years at Access Bank Ghana Plc. She is the first woman to serve in that position since the commercial bank was founded in 2009.

== Background and education ==
Nkrumah was born in Ghana in the 1980s. She attended local primary and secondary schools, before being admitted to the University of Ghana, the country's largest and oldest public university. She graduated with a Bachelor of Science degree in Business Administration. Her second degree, a Master of Business Administration, was obtained from the same university. She also holds a Bachelor of Laws degree, awarded by the Ghana Institute of Management and Public Administration.

== Career ==
She started her banking career circa 2004, as a bank teller at Standard Chartered Ghana. Over the years, she was given more responsibilities, rising through the ranks to assistant branch manager and then to business relationship manager. In 2012, after nearly 9 years at Standard Chartered Ghana, she left and was hired by Stanbic Bank Ghana.

At Stanbic Bank Ghana, Nkrumah continued to rise in rank, from relationship manager in commercial banking to head of new business, to head of SME banking. At the time she left Stanbic, she was the head of main markets, responsible for retail banking, analytics, banking platforms, partnerships and innovation. She is credited for establishing the "Youth Banking Desk" at Stanbic Bank Ghana, "an innovation to increase youth financial inclusion".

== Other considerations ==
In her position as executive director at Access Bank Ghana, Pearl Nkrumah sits on the board of directors and is a member of the executive management team of that commercial bank.

== See also ==
- Access Bank Group
- List of banks in Ghana
