= William George Mensah Brandful =

Ghanaian diplomat

Ghana High Commissioner to Zambia
- In office 2008–2011
- President: John Kufuor
- Succeeded by: Elizabeth Afua Benneh

Ghana ambassador to Japan
- In office 2011–2012
- President: John Evans Atta Mills
- Preceded by: Kwame Asamoah Tenkorang
- Succeeded by: Edmond Kofi Agbenutse Deh

Personal details
- Born: William George Mensah Brandful; 4 December 1952 (age 73) Cape Coast, Gold Coast
- Spouse: Dinah Coleman
- Education: Mfantsipim School; University of Ghana; Cheikh Anta Diop University; Polytechnic of Central London; University of Nairobi; École nationale d'administration; The Academy of International Law; University of Paris XI
- Occupation: Diplomat

William George Mensah Brandful (born 1952) is a Ghanaian diplomat and civil servant.

== Early life and education ==
William was born on 4 December 1952 at Cape Coast to Essie Essilfua Bradful (21 February 1925 – 12 May 2012) and William George Mensah Brandful (5 June 1915 – 4 May 1994). He attended Mfantsipim School from 1964 to 1971 and continued to the University of Ghana in 1971, completing in 1975. He proceeded to University of Dakar, Senegal for his postgraduate studies. He also studied at the Polytechnic of Central London; University of Nairobi, Kenya; École nationale d'administration; The Academy of International Law; and in January 1986, the University of Paris XI for a third Cycle Doctorate program in International Relations.

== Career ==
On 17 May 1977 he joined the Ministry of Foreign Affairs and Regional Integration. From October 1988 to October 1992 he was employed at the Ghana embassy in Cotonou, Benin. As a student pursuing his advanced level education at Mfantsipim School, his father arranged for him to spend his long vacations in Cotonou to improve his spoken French, and Benin subsequently became his first diplomatic station.

From September 1996 to September 2000 he was stationed at the Ghana embassy in Bonn, Germany. He returned to Ghana in 2000 and in November that year he was posted to the Ministry for Foreign Affairs to head its protocol bureau as chief of protocol. He served in this capacity until October 2002, when he was posted to Mali as minister plenipotentiary and deputy ambassador of Ghana to Mali, ending his stint in Mali in October, 2006. He served as supervisor of the Directorate for Policy Planning, Research and Monitoring for two years and in 2008 he was appointed Ghana's high commissioner to Zambia and also head of missions. After the Fukushima nuclear accident in May 2011, the late John Evans Atta Mills appointed him Ghana's ambassador to Japan. From 16 June 2011 to 31 December 2012, he was Ghana's ambassador to Japan with residence in Tokyo and was also accredited as high commissioner to Singapore.

In September 2012, he chose to accept the offer of the Mizutani group of potential investors in Ghana. The offer was about a sponsored space that was to be used as a private office. Brandful signed the makeup contract of the real estate group Sakae Dori Maruzen Co. Ltd. in his private name, with his diplomatic identification. By December 2012 there had not been any follow up by the group to equip the office with material. The ambassador assumed there was a lack of interest on the part of the group to begin investment activities in Ghana. The ambassador consequently called for the facility to be cancelled. The cancellation of the facility was effective on 28 March 2013. He dissociated himself from developments in Tokyo regarding the facility.

== Personal life ==
He is married to Dinah Coleman and together they have four daughters and also three grandchildren. His hobbies include squash, tennis, golf and playing the piano.
