= Fuseini Issah =

Ghanaian politician (born 1975)

Member of the Ghana Parliament for Okaikwei North Constituency
- Incumbent
- Assumed office 7 January 2017
- Preceded by: Elizabeth K. T. Sackey

Personal details
- Born: 2 February 1975 (age 51)
- Party: New Patriotic Party
- Education: University of Ghana

Fuseini Issah (born 2 February 1975) is a Ghanaian politician and member of the Seventh Parliament of the Fourth Republic of Ghana representing the Okaikwei North constituency in the Greater Accra Region on the ticket of the New Patriotic Party.

== Education ==
He graduated from the University of Ghana with a B.S.C., an EMBA, an FCCA from the Association of Chartered Accountants in the United Kingdom, and a certificate in venture capital and private equity from Harvard University in the United States.

== Politics ==
Issah is a member of New Patriotic Party and was the member of parliament for Okaikwei North constituency in the Seventh Parliament of the Fourth Republic of Ghana.

=== 2016 election ===
Issah contested the Okaikwei North constituency parliamentary seat on the ticket of New Patriotic Party during the 2016 Ghanaian general election and won with 28,083 votes representing 54.09% of the total votes. He won the election over Abdul Razak Issah of the National Democratic Congress who polled 23,617 votes which is equivalent to 45.49%, parliamentary candidate for the Convention People's Party Mathew Kwasi Obeng Boadu had 156 votes representing 0.30%, and the parliamentary candidate for the APC Joseph Akoto Lamptey had 60 votes representing 0.12% of the total votes.

=== 2020 election ===
Issah again contested the Okaikwei North(Ghana parliament constituency) parliamentary seat on the ticket of the New Patriotic Party during the 2020 Ghanaian general election but lost the election to Theresa Lardi Awuni of the National Democratic Congress.
