= Okuapemman School =

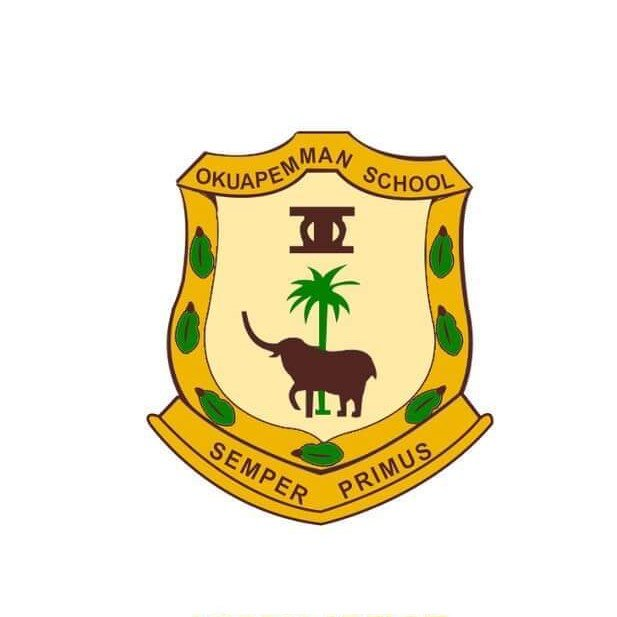
- OKUAS crest

Location
- P. O. Box 99; Akropong; Eastern Region; Ghana
- 5.95957°N 0.0947°W

Information
- Type: Public high school
- Motto: Latin: Semper Primus (Always first)
- Denomination: Presbyterian
- Established: February 1957 (69 years ago)
- Founder: Kwaku Opoku Acheampong (LLB)
- Status: Active
- School district: Akuapim North District
- Oversight: Ministry of Education
- Head teacher: Rev. Richard Afari
- Staff: 180 teachers
- Gender: Co-educational
- Age range: 14-18
- Classes offered: General Arts; Home Economics; General Science; General Agriculture; Business; Visual Arts
- Campus type: Urban
- Houses: 4
- Colours: Brown and white
- Slogan: Semper Primus!
- Sports: Track and field football basketball
- Nickname: OKUAS
- Rival: H'Mount Sinai SHS
- Publication: Primus magazine
- Website: okuapemmanschooledu.com

Okuapemman School, popularly known as OKUAS, is a category A coeducational second-cycle school in Akropong in the Eastern Region of Ghana.

== History ==
The school was established on the 8th of February, 1957 by barrister Charles Opoku Acheampong, who had been a pupil in the chambers of Edward Akufo-Addo.

Due to establishment in a traditional and royal area, past students earn the name "Adehye", which means "royal family".

The school was started by Barrister Opoku Acheampong with population of 182 pupils, 159 boys and 2 girls in forms one to three and was handed to the government of Ghana after his demise. The pioneer teachers were only 6. The school started to run sixth form course in 1963.

Having built it he adequately equipped the Okuapemmman School; notably dormitories were furnished with vono spring iron beds and kept mattresses; students of this school were the first to enjoy using such comfortable beds in the Gold Coast (Ghana).

The school runs both a day and boarding system, with the majority of the students in the boarding house. There are eight houses for boarding students, with four for girls and four for boys. They are Opoku Acheampong House - Blue, Akuffo House - Green, Kwadade House - Yellow, and Addo Dankwa House - Red. Offei Awuku House has recently been added as a Day House for Day Students.

The school practices an inclusive system which enables visually impaired students to have access to education. They can participate in activities and share facilities with the other students.

== Enrollment ==
The school has about 4,500 students, including special needs students. Special needs students are enrolled in the general arts class and are offered courses on languages (Twi, Ga, Ewe and French), History, Government, Literature and CRS. They are excluded from Mathematics and Science.

== Notable alumni ==
- Dennis Edward Aboagye, politician
- Teddy Safori Addi, politician
- Kwamena Ahwoi, academic and politician
- Elvis Afriyie Ankrah, politician
- Yaw Darko Asare, judge; active justice of the Supreme Court of Ghana
- Christian Tetteh Yohunu, Commissioner of Police and the Inspector General of Police of the Ghana Police Service
- Kwami Sefa Kayi, media personality
- Israel Laryea, broadcast journalist
- Margaret Sarfo, writer
- Kwame Asamoah Tenkorang, diplomat
- Tinny, hiplife rapper
- Fuzzy Dapaah Torbay, politician
- KalyJay, Ghanaian social media influencer and activist

== See also ==
- Education in Ghana
- List of senior high schools in Ghana
