= Dennis Edward Aboagye =

Ghanaian politician

Hon. Dennis Edward Aboagye

Personal details
- Party: New Patriotic Party
- Children: four
- Education: University of Ghana, The Chartered Institute of Marketing, Central University
- Occupation: Entrepreneur (Agribusiness & Real Estate), Politician
- Profession: Chartered Marketer

Dennis Edward Aboagye also known as Dennis Miracles Aboagye (born 27 February 1985) is a Ghanaian politician who was previously appointed as a presidential staffer, responsible for Local Government and Decentralization with additional responsibility as the Executive Secretary for the Inter-Ministerial Coordinating Committee on Decentralization.

== Early life and education ==
He was born and raised in Larteh Akuapem in the Eastern Region of Ghana. He is the only child of his parents. He started his basic education at Larteh Presby Primary School and later proceeded to Swedru International School (SWIS) where he completed his basic education, then he attended Okuapeman School where he completed his secondary education. After his secondary education, he attended the University of Ghana where he gained a Bachelor of Arts Degree in Political Science.He has a Chartered Postgraduate diploma as a marketer from The Chartered Institute of Marketing UK and a Chartered Marketer with the Chartered Institute of Marketing Ghana–CIMG. He also has an MBA in Marketing from Central University.

== Career ==
Dennis has been working in the sales and marketing industry for over ten years, with knowledge of fast-moving consumer goods and financial services. He also worked in the pension industry, where he started as a client relations executive. He was promoted to become relationship manager and subsequently became the unit head in charge of client relations. Dennis was the Eastern Regional Director of the Youth Enterprises and Skills Development Centre (YESDEC), a World Bank-funded project promoting job creation.

== Political career ==
He was the Municipal Chief Executive for Akuapem North. He is a leading communicator for the Nana Akuffo-Addo led government and party, the New Patriotic Party. He has served as an executive of the party at the polling station level before becoming a Constituency Youth Organizer for Akropong Constituency. He served as the campaign manager for his party in the Akropong constituency for the 2008, 2012, and 2016 elections.

He is a patron of his political party at the constituency and regional levels. He serves on several committees for the party at the regional and national levels assisting in strategy formulation and execution. Dennis served as a special aide to the Member of Parliament for Akropong, Hon. William Ofori Boafo, between 2007 and 2013.

Dennis was appointed as a spokesperson for the vice president, H.E. Mahamudu Bawumia. During the 2023 presidential primaries for the New Patriotic Party.

He previously served as a presidential staffer with additional responsibility as the executive secretary for the Inter-Ministerial Coordinating Committee on Decentralisation, an 11-member Ministerial Committee chaired by the Former President, H.E Nana Addo Dankwah Akufo-Addo with the mandate of driving policy formulation and coordination geared towards deepening decentralization in Ghana.

== Personal life ==
Dennis is a Christian and married with four children.
