= Joseph Darko-Mensah =

Ghanaian politician

Hon. Joseph Darko-Mensah

Member of parliament for Okaikwei North Constituency
- In office 7 January 1997 – 6 January 2001
- President: Jerry John Rawlings

Member of parliament for Okaikwei North constituency
- In office 7 January 2001 – 6 January 2005
- President: John Agyekum Kuffuor
- Succeeded by: Elizabeth K. Tawiah Sackey

Personal details
- Born: 22 February 1942
- Died: 16 May 2011 (aged 69)
- Party: New Patriotic Party
- Education: University of London; University of Ghana
- Occupation: Lawyer
- Committees: Defence and Interior

Joseph Darko-Mensah (22 February 1942 – 16 May 2011) was a Ghanaian politician and lawyer who served as a member of the third parliament of the Fourth Republic of Ghana. He represented the Okaikwei North constituency in the Greater Accra Region under the ticket of the New Patriotic Party (NPP).

== Political career ==
=== Member of Parliament ===
Darko-Mensah first assumed office as a parliamentarian in the years 1997 and 2001 after winning in the 1996 and 2000 parliamentary elections. He won a majority 33,067 votes in the 1996 Ghanaian general election and 36,511 votes in the 2000 Ghanaian general election on the ticket of the New Patriotic Party. He lost his seat to Madam Elizabeth K. Tawiah Sackey in the 2004 Ghanaian general elections.

==== 1996 Parliamentary Elections ====
Darko-Mensah was elected as a member of parliament for the Okaikwei North Constituency in the Greater Accra Region of Ghana, making him a member of the second parliament of the fourth republic of Ghana. he won with a total vote cast of 34,641 representing 35.20% against his opponents: Philip Kwame Agbeyome of the National Democratic Congress who polled 33,067 votes representing 33.50% of the total votes cast, Kwaku Oteng Anane of the Convention People's Party who also polled a total vote cast of 5,697 which represent 5.80%, Abdullah Nii Armah of the People's National Convention polling total vote cast of 3, 193 representing 3.20% and Mohammed Saleh Sinare of National Convention Party polled 474 which represent 0.50% of the total valid votes.

==== 2000 Parliamentary Elections ====
He also won the Okaikwei parliamentary seat during the 2000 Ghanaian parliamentary election.. He won a total of 55.50% of the total votes cast. Darko-Mensah contested with other candidates from the National Democratic Congress (NDC) represented by Mrs. Mawuenyenga Sally Okauley, People's National Convention (PNC) represented by Alhajia Salamatu Ali-Lawal, National Reform Party (NRP) represented by Barikisu Shardow Shahad, and Convention People's Party (CPP) represented by Reindorf Nii Kwao Mettle. The total votes cast was 65,742. Mr. Darko-Mensah won by attaining 35,611 votes beating Mrs. Okailey by 12,045 votes. Mrs. Okailey won a total of 24,466 which is 37.20%. The PNC, NRP and CPP representatives won 2,268, 1,328, and 1,169 votes respectively.

== Exit from politics ==
Joseph Darko-Mensah exited politics and resumed legal practice when he was expelled from the New Patriotic Party prior to the 2004 general elections on claims of disloyalty.
