= Bright Allotey =

Ghanaian international footballer

Personal information
- Date of birth: 14 September 1991 (age 35)
- Place of birth: Accra, Ghana
- Position: Defender

Senior career*
Years	Team	Apps	(Gls)
2005–2016	Great Olympics		

International career
2009	Ghana	1	(0)
- * Club domestic league appearances and goals

Bright Allotey (born 14 September 1991) is a Ghanaian former footballer who played as a defender.

== Career ==
Born in Accra, Allotey played club football for Great Olympics.

Allotey his first call up was on 12 September 2009 for a friendly game against Argentina national football team, in this match made his international debut on 1 October 2009.
