= Hope City =

Technology park in Ghana

Architectural Impression of Hope City

HOPE City is a planned technology park to be built at Prampram, Greater Accra Region, Ghana. It is being undertaken by Rlg Communications. HOPE City is an acronym for Home, Office, People and Environment. The project is expected to be completed in three years and is estimated to cost $US 10 billion; one of its towers will become Africa's tallest building. The project is an initiative of Mr. Roland Agambire, Group Chairman of the AGAMS Group of Companies and CEO of Rlg Communications Ltd, in collaboration with the Government of Ghana, as part of the national development policy framework, turning Ghana into a knowledge-society and an active player in the global economy.

HOPE city has been regarded as a great opportunity to create a “pilot project” for a sustainable real estate development in Ghana and Africa, in accordance to LEED Leadership in Energy & Environmental Design.

After an economic downturn in Ghana and scandal regarding Rlg Communications, construction on the project has yet to begin and no new construction timeline has been set.

== Project ==
HOPE City will host a cluster of buildings and facilities to serve as an ICT Park.

The cluster is expected to cover a total Gross Floor Area of approximately 1,200,000 sqm. It has been designed as a vertical city of towers linked together by bridges at different heights, with both public and private facilities. The cluster is composed of six towers: one tower of 270 m height (75 stories, the highest in Africa), two towers of 216 m height (60 stories) and three towers of 152 m height (42 stories).

The towers will have a central space or Piazza on three levels and an inner garden.

== Sod cutting ==
The sod cutting ceremony for the project was done by the President of Ghana, John Dramani Mahama, on 4 March 2013.

== Architecture ==
The project was designed by Paolo Brescia and Tommaso Principi of the Italian architectural firm Open Building Research. The architectural design is based on the traditional round house unit predominantly found in the three northern regions of Ghana. The technology park will have six towers units. The tallest will have seventy five floors with a height of over 270 metres and will be the tallest building on the African continent. Two of the towers will have sixty floors and be 216 metres tall, and the remaining three towers will have forty-two floors and be 152 metres tall. The six towers will share link bridges on various floors to facilitate movement from between towers.

== Sites ==
The purpose of the city will be to offer commercial floor space for banks and shopping malls. The vertical city will have over 50,000 workers in the field of information and communications technology who will be engaged in the design and manufacturing of software and hardware for local consumption and export. The city will have apartments to house 25,000 inhabitants. The technology park will reside on a 100,000 square metre plot of land, and will have a total gross floor area of approximately 1,200,000 square metres. It is also expected to include a university, schools, a hospital, and sporting amenities.

== See also ==
- Business cluster – Geographic concentration of related businesses
- Science park – Area designed to promote science or technology business development
