= Ebenezer Ate Allotey =

Ghanaian diplomat

Ghana Ambassador to the Ivory Coast
- In office 1987–1989
- President: Jerry John Rawlings
- Succeeded by: J. E. A. Kotei

Personal details
- Born: Ebenezer Ate Allotey; 28 November 1933 Accra, Gold Coast
- Died: 5 April 2024 (aged 90)
- Education: Accra Academy; St. Augustine's College
- Occupation: Diplomat

Ebenezer Ate Allotey (28 November 1933 – 5 April 2024) was a Ghanaian public servant and diplomat who served as Ghana's ambassador to Côte d'Ivoire from 1987 to 1989.

== Early life and education ==
Ebenezer Ate Allotey was born on 28 November 1933, in Accra. Ate Allotey was the twin brother of Oko Allotey. His father, Magnus Kojo Allotey, served as an administrative officer for the Tarkwa Trading Company, later known as UAC (now Unilever), and was also an auctioneer. Ate's mother, Majory Mould, was the eldest daughter of William Kojo Mould from the Mould family of Jamestown, British Accra. He was raised by Ellen Buckle.

His educational journey began at Kinbu Government School for primary education from 1940 to 1949, followed by secondary education at Accra Academy from 1950 to 1953. In 1955, he entered St. Augustine's College where he studied for his sixth form education graduating in 1956.

== Career ==
In 1960, Ate Allotey joined the Ministry of Foreign Affairs as a Foreign Service Officer. He later served in various capacities in Ghana's foreign missions in Morocco, UK, Liberia and Côte d'Ivoire. In Morocco he served as Head of Chancery, Counsellor in the UK, Minister Counsellor in Liberia, and Deputy Ambassador of Ghana to La Côte d'Ivoire. He was appointed Ghana's ambassador to La Côte d'Ivoire, serving in this capacity from 1987 to 1989. As Ghana's ambassador to La Côte d'Ivoire, he signed a loan agreement under which the African Fund Development Fund (FAD) granted a rapid disbursement loan of 20.20 million UCF (approximately $23.8 million) to finance part of the agricultural sector rehabilitation program in Ghana. The loan, which was to be disbursed over two years, representing 44.6% of the total foreign exchange cost of the agricultural sector rehabilitation program.

He served as director of Foreign Affairs, Research and Training, where he provided advice on overseas tours and also worked as a security advisor. In 1982, he was detained for three months at Burma Camp for publicly speaking out against the overthrow of Hilla Limann. In 1995, he was appointed member of a negotiating team that was to help restore peace to Liberia during the First Liberian Civil War. He was in the team with James Victor Gbeho, the then ECOWAS special representative for Liberia and an ally of Flt Lt Jerry John Rawlings (who was then Chairman of the Economic Community of West African States (ECOWAS)) and later joined by Dr. Mohammed Ibn Chambas who was the then Deputy Foreign Minister, and Brigadier General Agyemfra, accompanied by Harry Mouzillas from Ghana News Agency (GNA) as a journalist to cover the events. From 2000 to 2001, he served as a delegate of a delegation founded to foster peace and stability in Liberia.

Following his retirement from public service, Ate Allotey served on various committees. In 1998, he was a Member of a seven-member committee appointed to investigate the impasse between the Lighthouse Chapel International and the Youth of Korle Gonno. The committee was to review the persistent conflict between the two parties and to make recommendations for a peaceful solution. Other members of the group included; Mr George Quaynor-Mettle, Madam Regina Asampa-Quaye, Mrs. Ama Amponsah, the Rev. Samuel N. Mensah and Bishop Nicholas Duncan-Williams.

In 1999 he was a part of a five-member commission of inquiry, under the chairmanship of then High Court Judge Nasiru Sulemana Gbadegbe, which was set up to investigate the player transfer market in Ghana football. The commission was set up by the Ministry of Youth and Sports, to examine the local player market to ascertain whether it is being operated in accordance with FIFA regulations. With him on the commission were Abuga Pele, a member of parliament, and George Boro Dasoberi.

== Honours ==
In 2018, Ate Allotey was awarded by the Ministry of Foreign Affairs and Regional Integration for his work to advance Ghana's Foreign Service. The award was handed by the Vice President of the Republic of Ghana, Mahamudu Bawumia who remarked that there was the need to publicly celebrate his achievements and the deep sense of patriotism he exhibited in the discharge of his duty to the country.

== Personal life and death ==
Ate Allotey was married to Elizabeth Odoley Sowah Allotey and together, they had three children, two daughters and a son. He died on 5 April 2024.
