= Paolo Brescia =

Italian architect

Paolo Brescia is an Italian architect and founder of OBR Open Building Research.

He graduated with a degree in architecture from the Politecnico di Milano in 1996 and had his academic fellowship at Architectural Association in London.

After working with Renzo Piano, he founded OBR with Tommaso Principi in the year 2000 to investigate new ways of contemporary living, creating a design network among Milan, London, Mumbai and New York. He combines his professional experience with the academic world as guest lecturer in several athenaeums, such as Accademia di Architettura di Mendrisio, Kent State University, Aalto University, University of Oulu, Academy of Architecture of Mumbai, College of Architecture of Pune, Mimar Sinan Fine Art University, Hacettepe University, Florida International University in Miami. He was university professor in charge at Politecnico di Milano (2004–2005) and University of Genoa (2013–2015).

With OBR his projects have been featured in international exhibitions, including at X Biennale di Architettura in Venice 2006; RIBA Royal Institute of British Architects in London 2007; V Bienal de Arquitetura in Brasilia 2007; XI Bienal Internacional de Arquitectura in Buenos Aires 2007; AR Award Exhibition in Berlin 2008; China International Architectural Expo in Beijing 2009; International Expo in Shangai 2010; UIA 24th World Congress of Architecture in Tokyo 2011; Energy at MAXXI in Rome 2013; Italy Now in Bogotá 2014; Small Utopias in Johannesburg 2014; XIV Biennale di Architettura in Venice 2014; Triennale di Milano in Milan 2015 and Cooper Hewitt Smithsonian Design Museum in New York 2016.

== Working life ==
From 1998, Paolo Brescia worked with Renzo Piano until the establishment of OBR Open Building Research in 2000.

With OBR, he won several design competitions, such as: Pythagoras Museum (2003), Galleria Sabauda in the Real Palace in Turin (2003), Milanofiori Residential Complex (2005), Ex Cinema Roma in Parma (2006), Galliera Hospital in Genoa (2009), Cesme Waterfront (2012), Via XX Settembre in Genoa (2012), Michelin HQ and Research Labs in Delhi (2014), Terrazza Triennale in Milan (2014), Parco Centrale di Prato (2015), Comparto Stazioni Varese (2016), Educational Pavilion in Unimore University in Modena (2018), Museo Mitoraj in Pietrasanta (2019), MIND Innovation Hub in Milan (2020), Casa BFF (2023)

== Major designs ==
- In 2012 he designed the first technology park in Ghana, the Hope City
- In 2013 he designed with Pinearq the new Galliera Hospital in Genoa
- In 2014 he designed with Policreo the "Pietro Barilla" Children Hospital in Parma
- In 2015 he designed the Terrazza Triennale for the World Exposition in Milan
- In 2016 he designed with Rajeev Lunkad the "Lehariya" Cluster in Jaipur
- In 2017 he designed the Piazza del Vento in Genova
- In 2018 he designed the Bassi Business Park for Generali in Milan
- In 2019 he designed the MIND Innovation Hub in Milan.

== Awards ==
Paolo has received several awards from around the world. They include:

- Emerging Architecture at the RIBA Royal Institute of British Architects London (2007)
- Plusform award for Best architecture realized by young architect under 40 (2008)
- Urbanpromo by INU at 11th Biennale di Venezia (2008)
- Gold Medal finalist for Italian Architecture at Triennale di Milano (2009)
- Europe 40 Under 40 in Madrid (2010)
- Ance Award, Realized Architecture by young architect, Rome (2011)
- Overall Leaf Awards Winner, London (2011)
- Wan Awards Residential, London (2011)
- Finalist for the gold medal for Italian Architecture, La Triennale di Milano (2012)
- Ad’A Award for Italian Architecture, Roma (2013)
- Finalist for the Architizer Awards, London (2013)
- Building Healthcare Award for Best International Design, London (2014)
- Inarch International Award for Architecture and Design, Milano (2015)
- American Architecture Prize for Architectural Design, New York (2016)
- Premio Urbanistica INU, Milano (2017)
- RIUSO, CNAPPC, Milano (2019)
- Best Italian Project Award, IQI, Milano (2022)
- MIPIM Awards, Winner Best New Development, Cannes (2024)

== Reference contacts ==
- Lotus International, n. 122, Paolo Brescia, La provvisorietà degli oggetti, Milano, February–March 2004
- Casabella Japan, n. 759, Le Città Invisibili, Tokyo, October 2007
- La Repubblica, Donatella Alfonso, Dalla Fiera a Nervi: nasce Genova beach, Genova, 4 September 2009
- Il Giornale dell’Architettura, Genova, piastra verde per il nuovo Galliera, Torino, 2010
- Lotus International, n. 148, Michele Nastasi and Nina Bassoli, New Urban Housing, OBR Milanofiori, Milano, December 2011
- Casabella, n. 809, Marco Muzzani, OBR Brescia Principi: Museo Pitagora, Arnoldo Mondadori, Verona, January 2012
- La Repubblica, Energia in forma, 14 March 2013
- Il Messaggero, La sfida di Energy: come fare città più belle, 21 March 2013
- La Repubblica, Francesco Erbani, Architettura energetica: dal petrolio al post petrolio, Roma, 29 March 2013
- AA. VV. Pippo Ciorra, Energy: Architettura e reti del petrolio e del post petrolio, Fondazione MAXXI, Mondadori Electa, Milano, April 2013
- La Repubblica, All’Expo Gate gli ultimi incontri con gli architetti sull’area del Castello, Milano, 29 July 2014
- La Repubblica, Ilaria Carra, Undici idee per il Castello, Milano, 28 September 2014
- AA. VV. Marco Biraghi, Silvia Micheli, Storia dell’Architettura Italiana 1985 – 2015, Einaudi, Torino, November 2013
- La Repubblica, Bettina Bush, Ridiamo il mare a Genova, Genova, 4 April 2015
- Artribune, Simona Galateo, OBR e il nuovo ristorante sulla terrazza della Triennale di Milano, Roma, 22 April 2015
- La Repubblica, Michela Bompani, Ciclabile in via Venti, Roma, 28 July 2015
- La Repubblica, Bettina Bush, Ecco il nuovo Galliera, quattrocento posti e Giardini con vista, Genova, 25 December 2015
- Living, Corriere della Sera, n. 5, Susanna Legrenzi, Acqua Power, Milano, May 2016
- Il Giornale dell’Architettura, Michele Cerutti But, Prato: coraggioso landscape urbanism in centro storico, Torino, 11 October 2016
- Lotus International, n. 161, Michele Nastasi, Meteo Milano, OBR, Milano, 2016
- La Repubblica, Laura Montanari, Prato: dove la rinascita è un’arte, 16 February 2017
- Corriere della Sera, Roberto Rotondo, Varese cambia pelle (urbana), 6 June 2017
- La Repubblica, Massimo Minella, Giusto aver dato fiducia a Genova, Genova, 14 September 2017
- La Repubblica, Nicola Barti, I dialoghi di Tursi, Genova, 15 September 2017;
- Corriere della Sera, Il salone nautico di Genova, Milano, 17 September 2017
- Artribune, Valentina Silvestrini, Piazza del Vento. Sul waterfront di Genova il progetto di OBR ispirato da Piano, 1 November 2017
- La Repubblica di Genova, Porto di Santa Margherita, il nuovo progetto, Genova, 30 December 2017
- AA. VV., Vincenzo Tinè and Enrico Pinna, Rinnovare i musei dei maestri, SAGEP, Genova, September 2019
- Il Giornale dell’Architettura, Cristina Donati, Dalla Terrazza Triennale al fare l’architetto oggi: un dialogo con Paolo Brescia, 25 March 2019
- La Repubblica (Firenze Cultura), Elisabetta Berti Il tesoro di Mitoraj nel museo trasparente della sua Pietrasanta, 4 January 2020
- Il Giornale dell’Architettura, Alessandro Colombo, Ri_visitati. Pitagora a Crotone, 23 June 2021
- La Repubblica, Massimo Minella, Waterfront, nuovo quartiere di Genova “Canali, parco urbano e palazzi green”, Genova, 6 July 2021.
