= Nevada gaming area =

Since 1971, the Nevada Gaming Control Board (NGCB) has published an annual Abstract summarizing gaming and non-gaming revenue for the entire state. The document is roughly 250 pages long. Detailed data is provided for different groups of casinos, organized by geography, size (according to gaming revenue), and public corporations vs. privately owned. Nevada State Gaming law (NRS 463.120. requires that financial information for individual casinos be kept in confidence.

The names of the resorts in any category are often speculated on but a definitive list is not revealed by the NGCB in accordance with state law. A category is known as casinos with gaming revenue above $72 million per year has been in use for over 20 years. However, independent analysis conducted by Frank Martin has revealed the names of the resorts for the Fiscal Year 2008.

By the end of the decade, Nevada had become the fastest-growing state in the nation and increased gaming revenues by 150 percent.

== Gaming Revenue Depression ==
Monthly revenue from October 2007 represents the highest yearly moving average (i.e. 12 months ending October 2007). The 12-month moving average ending October 2009 is the same as the 12-month ending October 2004 (so gaming is now down to what it was five years ago). The pit revenue for the state is shown in the graph. Slot revenue also dropped a billion and a half dollars since October 2007. Blackjack gaming revenue is down to the 1997 levels.

Statewide Gaming Revenue For Pit
Baccarat is the only table game that has completely recovered from the depression.
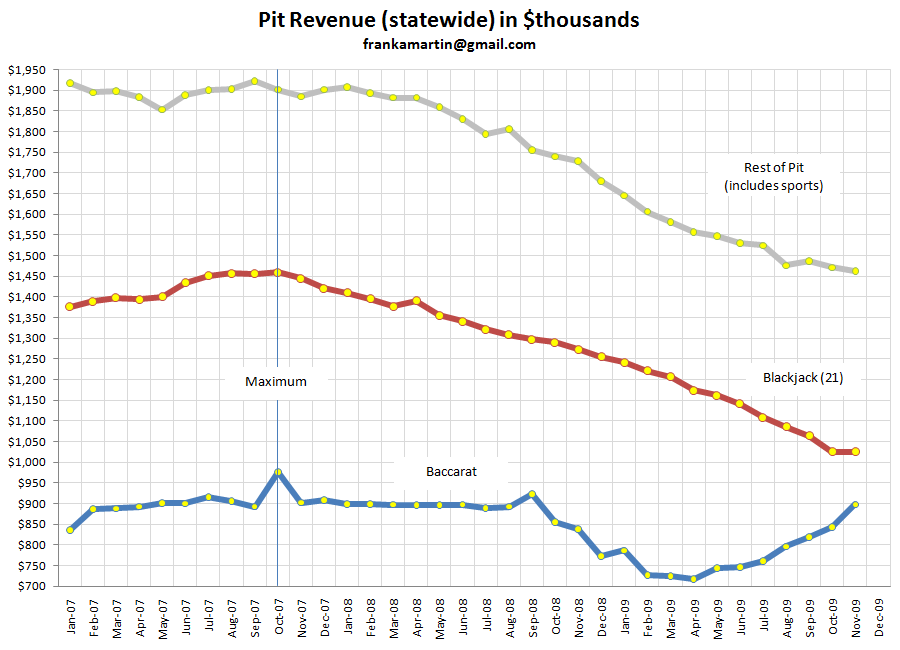

== Large Revenue Casino Resorts ==
One statewide category is Statewide Casinos with Room Facilities with Gaming Revenue of over $72 million a year. The document indicates that there are 45 locations that qualify for this category in the fiscal year 2009 (1 July 2008–30 June 2009). Five of the locations are Not Publicly Owned which means they also have no public debt. There are 23 properties located on the strip, 13 more in urban Las Vegas, 3 in Laughlin, and the final 6 in Lake Tahoe and Reno area.

The aggregate of the 45 casinos earned about 71% of the gaming revenue for the state, and over 70% of the non-gaming revenue. These properties averaged $190 million in gaming revenue and $227 million in non-gaming revenue.

=== Top 6 Revenue Casino Resorts ===
The NGCB abstract gives the total revenue (gaming and non-gaming) for the strip resort ranked #6, but it does not give the names of the top casinos. It can be presumed that they are the following resorts in the table below

The top 6 licenses in FY 2008 all had at least $942 million in total revenue.
LOC #	LICENSEE	Table Games	Rooms
01888-07	WYNN /ENCORE LAS VEGAS	263	4,750
01957-05	VENETIAN CASINO RESORT	247	8,108
01297-02	CAESARS PALACE	172	3,348
02982-07	MGM GRAND HOTEL/CASINO	172	6,852
00655-05	BELLAGIO	168	3,933
00022-03	MANDALAY BAY RESORT & CASINO	127	3,309

== Number of Properties in Other Revenue Groups ==
The names of the individual properties in lower revenue groups is more of interest to a potential investor as a top level analysis of the property revenue.

Nevada Statewide Resorts for Fiscal Year 2008
Room Facilities	Gaming Revenue	Ave. Gaming Revenue	Num. of Locations	% of State Gaming Revenue
yes	Over $72 million, Strip Only	$250.4	23	47.8%
yes	Over $72 million, Rest of State	$131.4	24	26.2%
yes	$36 –$72 million	$48.5	34	13.7%
yes	$12 –$36 million	$21.6	29	5.2%
yes	$1 –$12 million	$4.7	36	1.4%
no	Over $1 million	$5.7	120	5.7%

== Smaller, more Owned Casinos ==
This table is restricted to casinos that earned more than $12 million in gaming revenue in FY08. The previous table for gaming revenue greater than $72 million lists 47 casinos (42 of which are publicly owned). The additional list is 36 casinos (for a total of 78 publicly owned casinos in the state). Properties may or may not have rooms. Status is as of June 30, 2008.

The highest-profile resort on the strip area that did not exceed $72 million is the Hard Rock Casino. The company only secured its loan for expansion in June 2008 and began construction shortly thereafter. The trio of classic casinos on the strip from the 1950s, The Tropicana, The Riviera, and The Sahara, earned less than $72 million in FY08. Since the list is re-evaluated from year to year, these casinos may have made it in the past. Local Casinos in the Las Vegas area, like the Silverton Casino, the Fiesta Henderson, and the Fiesta Rancho did not surpass $72 million.

Nevada Statewide Publicly Owned Resorts Between $12 and $72 Million Fiscal Year 2008
LOC #	COUNTY	Corporation	NAME
16017-03	Clark	American Cas. EP	ARIZONA CHARLIE'S BOULDER
03403-05	Clark	Archon	PIONEER HOTEL AND GAMBLING HALL
02912-01	Clark	Boyd	CALIFORNIA HOTEL AND CASINO
00210-01	Clark	Boyd	ELDORADO CASINO
00694-03	Clark	Boyd	FREMONT HOTEL AND CASINO
01018-07	Clark	Boyd	JOKERS WILD
03461-04	Clark	Boyd	MAIN STREET STATION HOTEL, CASINO AND BR
17586-04	Clark	Hard Rock	HARD ROCK HOTEL & CASINO
03005-04	Clark	Harrah's Inc	BILL'S GAMBLIN' HALL & SALOON
04157-05	Clark	Herbst	TERRIBLE'S HOTEL AND CASINO
17378-01	Clark	Herbst	BUFFALO BILL'S RESORT & CASINO
13810-01	Clark	Herbst	PRIMM VALLEY RESORT & CASINO
03373-02	Clark	Herbst	WHISKEY PETE'S HOTEL & CASINO
01949-04	Clark	Landry's	GOLDEN NUGGET-LAUGHLIN
10547-01	Clark	MGM/Mirage	GOLD STRIKE HOTEL AND GAMBLING HALL
00004-04	Clark	MGM/Mirage	RAILROAD PASS CASINO
02448-02	Clark	MGM/Mirage	SLOTS-A-FUN
00370-02	Clark	MTR (since sold)	BINION'S GAMBLING HALL & HOTEL
00015-04	Clark	Riviera Holdings	RIVIERA HOTEL & CASINO
16639-01	Clark	STATION	BARLEY'S CASINO & BREWING COMPANY
16666-02	Clark	STATION	FIESTA CASINO HOTEL
19166-03	Clark	STATION	FIESTA HENDERSON CASINO HOTEL
04737-04	Clark	Tropicana	RIVER PALMS RESORT CASINO
09430-01	Clark	Tropicana	TROPICANA EXPRESS HOTEL & CASINO
00360-04	Clark	Tropicana	TROPICANA RESORT AND CASINO
01620-05	Clark	Virgin	OASIS RESORT CASINO GOLF & SPA
13379-02	Clark	Virgin	VIRGIN RIVER HOTEL & CASINO
01190-03	Douglas	Tropicana	LAKE TAHOE HORIZON CASINO RESORT
03132-03	Douglas	Tropicana	MONTBLEU
00166-01	Elko	Ameristar	CACTUS PETE'S RESORT CASINO
19629-01	Nye	Herbst	TERRIBLE'S TOWN
03112-02	Washoe	Herbst	TERRIBLE'S RAIL CITY CASINO
01635-03	Washoe	Herbst	SANDS REGENCY, THE
02926-03	Washoe	Jacobs	GOLD DUST WEST
03431-01	Washoe	MGM/Mirage	CIRCUS CIRCUS HOTEL/CASINO - RENO
00519-03	Washoe	Pinnacle	BOOMTOWN RENO

Herbst Gaming owns a chain of 8 properties branded as Terribles. None of these properties are in the over $72 million category, but three are in the above list of $12 to $72 million properties. By elimination, there are five TERRIBLE'S properties that are in the $1 to $12 million category. In addition, there are 4 other company-owned properties in the $12 to $72 million category that does not have the TERRIBLE'S brand name.

Herbst Gaming
Name	County	Name	Category
04157-05	Clark	TERRIBLE'S HOTEL AND CASINO flagship	($36 to $72 million)
19629-01	Nye	TERRIBLE'S TOWN PAHRUMP	($12 to $36 million)
03112-02	Washoe	TERRIBLE'S RAIL CITY CASINO	($12 to $36 million)
00724-07	Clark	TERRIBLE'S TOWN CASINO - HENDERSON	
03520-03	Clark	TERRIBLE'S TOWN CASINO - SEARCHLIGHT	
16575-03	Lyon	TERRIBLE'S CASINO - DAYTON	
02058-04	Washoe	TERRIBLE'S GOLD RANCH CASINO AND RV RESORT	
17274-04	Nye	TERRIBLE'S LAKESIDE CASINO	

The Herbst corporation reports in their annual report that the combined NV casino operations generated $337 million, but does not segment the number by property, gaming, room charge, RV charges, food and beverage, or other.

== Gaming Revenue Graph ==
Monthly revenue from October 2007 represent the monthly peak. It also is the highest yearly moving average (i.e. 12 months ending October 2007). The 12 month moving average ending October 2009 is the same as the 12 months ending October 2004 (so gaming is now down to what it was five years ago).

Statewide Gaming Revenue With Moving Average
Months of Oct 2009 and Oct 2007 highlighted in yellow to show maximum and minimum

== All casinos in state with Gaming Revenue Over $1m ==
Total casino count by county and county population on July 1 July 2008 is in the table below. The NGCB is prohibited by state law from revealing financial information on individual casinos, so it reports detailed financial data on groups of casinos.

The NGCB divides the 8 casinos in Douglas County as 5 in the South Lake Tahoe region, while the remaining 3 casinos are grouped along with the 11 casinos in Carson City in a region called Carson Valley. Douglas County has a major mountain ridge passing through the county that can be traversed via route 207, passing higher than 8500'.

The 42 casinos in largely rural counties are grouped together for statistical purposes by the NGCB as the balance of counties.

A full list of all the licenses that earned more than $1m in fiscal year 2009 is available by reference.

Clark county contains Las Vegas, Washoe county contains Reno/Sparks area, Elko county is the main gateway to Utah, South Lake Tahoe is a principal tourist area, and Carson Valley contains the state capital.

FY2009 Casinos over $1m in gaming revenue
Casinos	County	Road	1-Jul-08	FY07 $millions	FY08 $millions	FY09 $millions
149	Clark	I-15	1,865,746	$10,538	$10,172	$9,081
32	Washoe	I-80	410,443	$1,045	$977	$856
17	Elko	I-80	47,071	$324	$303	$279
5	South Lake Tahoe	Route 50	45,180	$283	$307	$264
14	Carson Valley	Route 395	54,867	$120	$114	$102
42	Balance of counties		176,860	$170	$167	$148
260	Total		2,600,167	$12,481	$12,040	$10,729

Balance of counties (detail)
Casinos	County	Road	1-Jul-08
12	Lyon County	I-80	53,022
6	Churchill County	I-80	24,896
6	Humboldt County	I-80	17,763
3	Pershing County	I-80	6,291
2	Lander County	I-80	5,086
9	Nye County	Route 160	44,375
3	White Pine County		9,199
1	Mineral County		4,684
1	Storey County		4,341
0	Lincoln County		4,898
0	Eureka County		1,628
0	Esmeralda County		677
43			

== Previous Years ==
The number of properties with revenue over $72 million has increased over the years (particularly outside of the strip). However, most of the large gains have been a result of mega resorts being built on the strip. The NGCB has not created a new category for the very large resorts (example: over $144 million). This hypothetical new category would probably contain at least ten resorts on the strip.

In 1990 the population of Clark County was 3/4 million (vs. 2 million today). The only localscasino likely to have broken $72 million in 1990 was Sam's Town (Palace Station is considered to be a strip casino by the NGCB). There are currently 8 casinos in northern Nevada and Laughlin that are cworthover $72 million. In 1990, seven of them existed. The financial information controlled by the NGCB is confidential forever, and is not released even after 7 years.

The table shows Gaming Licenses that earned over $72 million per year for Las Vegas Strip and for State of Nevada. Also, the number of licenses which earned gaming revenue of over $1 million per year for the entire state are shown.

Properties connected by hallways are permitted to operate under one license at the discretion of the owner. For most of FY2008, Bally's and Paris operated under one license; Venetian/Palazzo, Wynn/Encore, and Mandalay Bay/THE Hotel operate under one gaming license.

Numbers of Properties with Different Levels of Gaming Revenue Nov 2009 $10.36m
Fiscal	Gaming Revenue	%	Strip > $72M	State > $72M	State > $1M
2009	$10,786,660,000	-13.1%			
2008	$12,408,879,888	-0.6%	23	47	266
2007	$12,480,790,793	5.7%	23	48	270
2006	$11,809,095,031	10.8%	24	47	274
2005	$10,662,454,467	7.9%	24	46	268
2004	$9,883,510,737	6.8%	23	41	258
2003	$9,250,496,837	3.8%	23	42	256
2002	$8,911,540,280	-4.3%	22	39	249
2001	$9,310,594,712	positive	22	40	247
2000	$9,308,916,419	10.5%	22	39	243
1999	$8,426,224,115	8.8%	20	33	238
1998	$7,743,934,793	3.3%	20	33	238
1997	$7,493,752,537	1.4%	19	32	235
1996	$7,390,435,180	5.1%	19	30	229
1995	$7,030,994,404	8.1%	19	28	213
1994	$6,504,348,451	10.6%	19	28	207
1993	$5,880,592,442	5.3%	15	24	189
1992	$5,584,559,864	1.3%	14	23	192
1991	$5,513,297,150	11.3%	14	22	198
1990	$4,952,978,992	9.7%	13	20	182
1989	$4,514,157,698	10.2%			169
1988	$4,094,869,746	11.6%			165
1987	$3,667,783,405	12.4%			155
1986	$3,264,287,310	5.2%			145
1985	$3,103,770,229	5.5%			145
1984	$2,941,428,012	14.5%			145
1983	$2,569,785,000				138
1982					137
1981					136
1980					130
1979					125
1978					115
1977					108
1976					101

== See also ==
- Problem gambling
