= Margaret Sarfo =

Ghanaian author and journalist

- Born: January 26, 1957
- Died: May 8, 2014 (aged 57)
- Resting place: Osu Cemetery
- Education: University of Ghana
- Employer(s): The Mirror; Graphic Communications Group Limited
- Spouse: Kojo Safo
- Children: 4

Margaret Sarfo (pen name Peggy Oppong, née Odame; 26 January 1957 – 8 May 2014) was a Ghanaian author and journalist. She worked for the Graphic Communications Group Limited, rising through the ranks to become the editor of The Mirror.

== Early life and education ==
Sarfo was born in 1957 to Daniel Odame and his wife, of Mpraeso, Kwahu, in south Ghana. She attended primary schools in Adabraka, Accra, followed by the Okuapeman Secondary School, Akropong in 1971 where she attained the General Certificate of Education (GCE), Ordinary and Advanced levels. She enrolled at the University of Ghana in 1979, graduating with a BA (Hons) in English and Russian. After a year studying in Russia, she returned to the University of Ghana and obtained a Graduate Diploma and MPhil degrees in Communication Studies.

== Career ==
Margaret Safo joined the then Graphic Cooperation for her national service. She became permanently employed as a staff writer in 1987. She became deputy editor of The Mirror in 1998 and editor in 2003. Margaret Safo retired from the Graphics Communications Group in 2011 to write and publish her novels, including the following:

=== Selected works ===
- The dancing money box
- Echoes from the past
- End of the Tunnel
- Red Heifer
- Adventures of Cleopas
- Julia's Dance
- No Roses for Sharon
- The Black Heel... a terrifying betrayal

== Personal life ==
She was married to Mr. Kojo Safo after meeting him during her school days at the University of Ghana and joined him later in Nigeria in 1982; where she taught English Language at the Methodist Comprehensive High School in Ekiti State. They returned to Ghana three years afterwards. She had four children;Mrs Sena Offei-Anim of Fidelity Bank, Tamale; Ms Sedina Safo of Peggy Oppong Books, Accra; Samuel Safo of the Kwame Nkrumah University of Science and Technology, Kumasi and Mrs Dela Bonsu, Graphic Communication Group Limited.

== Death and funeral ==
Mrs Margaret Sarfo died at the 37 Military Hospital on May 8, 2014. She was buried at the Osu Cemetery on Saturday, June 28. She left behind her husband and four children.
