= Sylvester Jude Kpakpo Parker-Allotey =

Ghanaian diplomat

Ghana Ambassador to Japan
- In office 2014–2017
- President: John Mahama
- Preceded by: Edmond Kofi Agbenutse Deh
- Succeeded by: Frank Okyere

Personal details
- Born: Sylvester Jude Kpakpo Parker-Allotey; 1 February 1955 (age 71) Ghana
- Education: University of Ghana; University of Oxford
- Occupation: Diplomat

Sylvester Jude Kpakpo Parker-Allotey is Ghanaian diplomat and civil servant.

== Early life and education ==
Slyvester was born on 1 February 1955 in Ghana. He had his tertiary education at the University of Ghana in 1978. He continued at the Legon Center for International Affairs (LECIA) also at the University of Ghana from 1990 to 1991. Prior to that he had obtained a Post Graduate Certificate in International Relations from the Academy of Management and Science, Sofia, Bulgaria in 1989 and sponsored by the German Foreign Ministry to pursue a one-month course in Diplomacy in Berlin, Germany that same year. He entered the University of Oxford (Worcester College) in 1995 to study International Relations and Diplomacy. He obtained his Post-Graduate Certificate in 1996.

== Career ==
After obtaining his bachelor's degree in 1978, he was employed as the Secretary General of the Ghana National Catholic Youth Council. A year later, he joined the Pan African Shipping Company Ltd, Tema, Ghana and worked there as an Administrative Manager. In 1980 he became the Acting Deputy General Manager of the company. He was the Africa Regional Coordinator of Pax Romana (International Movement of Catholic Students) from 1980 to 1985. He joined the State Construction Corporation as the Public Relations Officer from 1985 to 1987. In February 1987 he became the Public Relations and Training Manager for the company. He served in this position until December 1987 when he joined the Ministry for Foreign Affairs in Ghana. There, he served as assistant director in the Non-Aligned Movement Secretariat from 1990 to 1991. In 1993 he was made acting Director of Finance and assistant director of International Organizations and Conferences Bureau a year later. He later served as deputy director of Finance and Accounts Bureau from October 1995 to August 1996. In October 2000, he was acting director of Policy Planning. Between 1996 and 2000 he served as Deputy Chief of Mission in Tel Aviv, Israel. In 2002 he served as Ghana's Deputy Permanent Representative to the United Nations Agencies in Geneva and Austria, he served in this capacity for two years. In 2004, he was appointed Deputy Head of Mission in Saudi Arabia, after a year in office he returned to the ministry in Ghana as Director of Passports. In November 2007 he served as Director of the Policy Planning, Research, Monitoring and Evaluation Bureau (PPMEB), after a year in office he was made Consul-General in Lagos a position he served in for two years. In 2010 he was appointed Deputy Head of Mission of the Ghana High Commission, South Africa and also Chargé d'Affaires of the mission from February 2011 to November 2011. In December 2011, he was appointed Director of the Policy Planning, Monitoring and Evaluation Bureau (PPMEB) at the Ministry Of Foreign Affairs and Regional Integration (MFA & RI) until November 2014. He was Ambassador of Ghana Plenipotentiary to Japan and High Commissioner to Singapore from October 2014 to 2017.

== Personal ==
His hobbies include writing, reading, football, debating and playing table tennis.
