= Open Building Research (design network) =

Open Building Research (OBR) is a design network connecting Milan, London, and New York. It was founded in 2000 by Paolo Brescia and Tommaso Principi to explore new approaches to contemporary living.

OBR collaborates with several multidisciplinary contributors and institutions, including the Accademia di Architettura di Mendrisio, Aalto University, the Academy of Architecture of Mumbai, and Mimar Sinan Fine Arts University.

OBR's work has been exhibited at the Venice Biennale of Architecture, the Royal Institute of British Architects, the Bienal de Arquitetura of Brasília, MAXX, and the Triennale di Milano.

In 2009, OBR became a partner of the Green Building Council.

== Projects ==
Notable projects by OBR include the Pythagoras Museum and the Milanofiori Residential Complex.

== Awards ==
The firm has received numerous awards including:

- The AR Award for Emerging Architecture at RIBA (2007)
- Plusform Under 40 (2008)
- Urbanpromo at the 11th Venice Biennale (2008)
- Europe 40 Under 40 in Madrid (2010)
- Leaf Award overall winner in London (2011)
- WAN Residential Award (2012)
- Building Healthcare Award (2014)
- In/Arch Award for Italian Architecture (2015)
- AAP American Architecture Prize for Architectural Design (2016)
- Best Italian Project Award, Milano (2022)
- MIPIM Awards, Best New Development, Cannes (2024)
