= Okaikwei North =

Constituency for the Parliament of Ghana

- constituency for the Parliament of Ghana
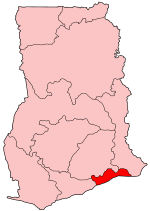
- District: Okaikwei North Municipal District
- Region: Greater Accra Region of Ghana

Current constituency
- Party: National Democratic Congress
- MP: Theresa Lardi Awuni

Okaikwei North is one of the constituencies represented in the Parliament of Ghana. It elects one Member of Parliament (MP) by the first past the post system of election. Okaikwei North is located in the Accra Metropolitan Area of the Greater Accra Region of Ghana.

== Members of Parliament ==
Election	Member	Party
1992	Sheriff E. Nii Oto Dodoo	National Democratic Congress
1996	Joseph Darko Mensah	New Patriotic Party
2000	Joseph Darko Mensah	New Patriotic Party
2004	Elizabeth Kwatsoe Tawiah Sackey	New Patriotic Party
2008	Elizabeth Kwatsoe Tawiah Sackey	New Patriotic Party
2012	Elizabeth Kwatsoe Tawiah Sackey	New Patriotic Party
2016	Fuseini Issah	New Patriotic Party
2020	Theresa Lardi Awuni	National Democratic Congress

== Elections ==
MPs elected in the Ghanaian parliamentary election, 2008:Okaikwei North Source: Ghana Home Page
Party	Candidate	Votes	%	±%
New Patriotic Party	Elizabeth Kwatsoe Tawiah Sackey	44,174	50.8	—
National Democratic Congress	Augustus Ken Kweku Eshun	41,342	47.6	—
People's National Convention	Victoria Kobbila	895	1.0	—
Convention People's Party	Mike Eghan Jnr.	499	0.6	—
Democratic Freedom Party	Noel Jean Kwesi Brahini	0.0	0.0	—
Majority		2,238	3.2	—
Turnout		—	—	—

== See also ==
- List of Ghana Parliament constituencies
