= Ghana Institute of Management and Public Administration =

Public university school in Greenhill, Accra, Ghana

- GIMPA
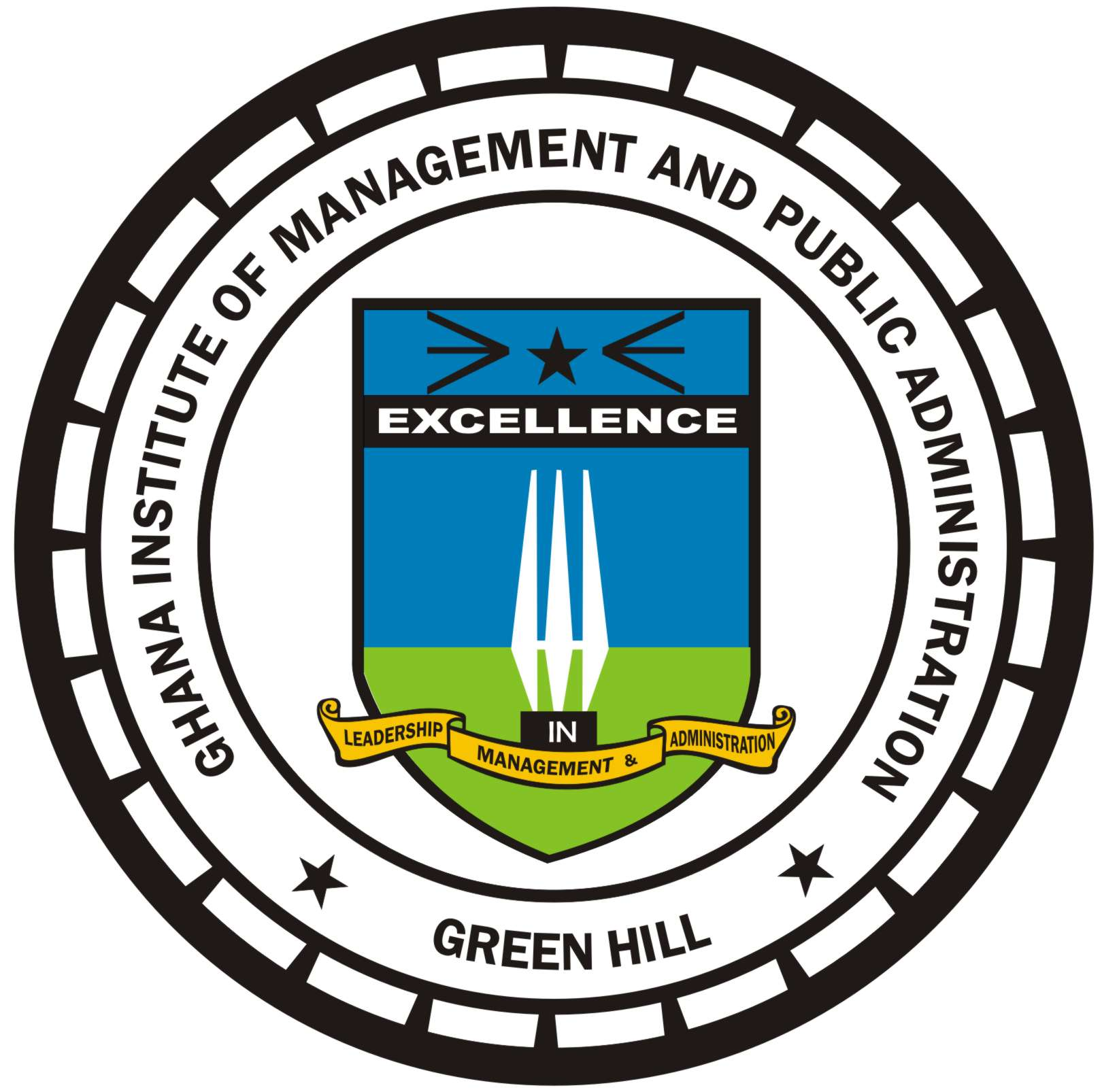

Location
- P.O. Box AH50, Achimota, Accra, Ghana; Accra; Greater Accra Region; Greenhill, Accra; Ghana

Information
- School type: Public University
- Motto: Excellence Leadership, Management and Administration
- Founded: 1961; 65 years ago
- Status: Active
- School district: West Legon
- Chairman: Kofi Darko Asante
- Rector: Philip Ebow Bondzi-Simpson
- Employees: 600
- Classes offered: Regular and Weekend
- Campuses: Greenhill Campus(MAIN), Tema Campus, Takoradi Campus and Kumasi Campus.
- Campus type: urban
- Nickname: GIMPA
- Accreditation: National Accreditation Board
- Affiliations: Association of African Business Schools
- Alumni: 15,000
- Website: gimpa.edu.gh

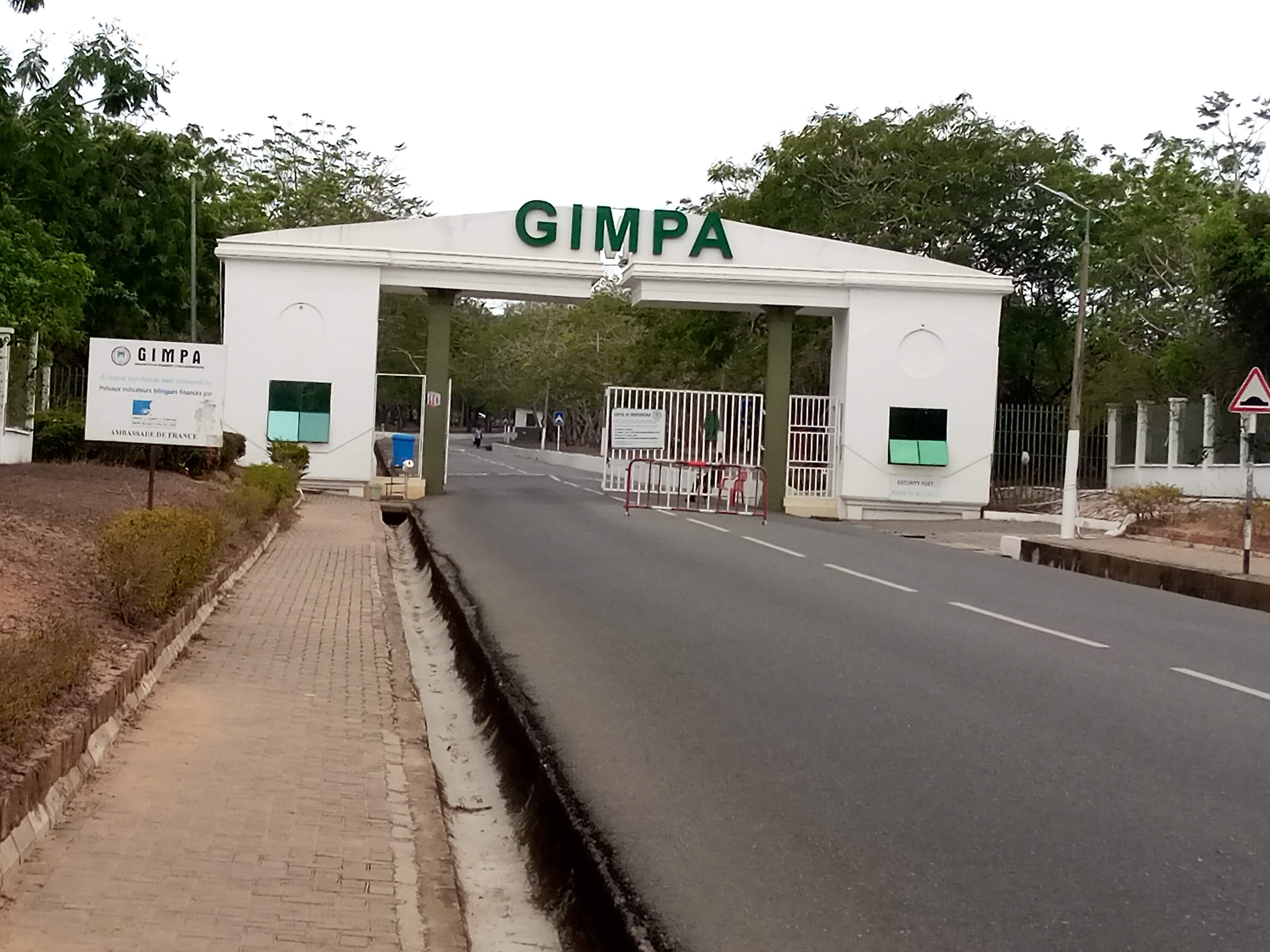
GIMPA main gate

The Ghana Institute of Management and Public Administration (GIMPA) is a public co-educational university spread over four campuses (Accra, Tema, Kumasi and Takoradi) and made up of six schools, ten research centers located at Greenhill in Accra, Ghana.

The location of GIMPA, Greenhill, was named by Nicholas T. Clerk (1930 – 2012) who served as the Rector of the institute from 1977 to 1982. The name, "Greenhill", is a reference to the lush greenery and hilly topography of the main campus, as well as its location in Legon which was historically on the periphery of the Ghanaian capital, Accra. Together with 200 state institutions, GIMPA successfully participated in a Public Sector Reform Programme under the auspices of the World Bank and became a self-financing institution as part of the National Institutional Reform Programme in 2001.

== History ==
It was established as a public university by an Act of Parliament in 2004. The institute was established in 1961 by the Government of Ghana with assistance from the United Nations Special Fund Project and was initially called the Institute of Public Administration, intended as a specialist training graduate school for civil servants in Ghana. Today, GIMPA offers bachelor's, master's and executive master's degree programmes in business administration, entrepreneurship, law, public administration, development management, governance, leadership and technology.

=== The Ghana Institute of Management and Public Administration logo ===
Vission: To position GIMPA clearly as the pre-eminent Centre of Excellence focused on capacity building in leadership, management, public administration and sustainability to support Ghanaian and African socioeconomic advancement.

Mission: GIMPA's primary purpose is to develop distinctive and capable public servants, private sector and non-governmental organizations' leaders with a strong sense of humanity to support sustainable national development.

At the centre of GIMPA's logo is the tripodal tower, which surges into the sky. It is inspired by the original motto of "Self Reverence, Self Knowledge and Self Control". This motto was taken from the poem "Oenone" by 19th century British poet Alfred Lord Tennyson. The relevant section reads:

"…Self-reverence, self-knowledge, self-control,

These three alone lead life to sovereign power.

Yet not for power (power of herself

Would come uncall'd for) but to live by law,

Acting the law we live by without fear;

And, because right is right, to follow right

Were wisdom in the scorn of consequence".

Borrowing from ancient traditions, these handcrafted ceremonial pieces create interest and respect by both participants and observers. They are important representations honouring GIMPA's continuity and academic strength.

== Schools/faculties ==
- GIMPA Business School
- School of Public Service and Governance
- School of Liberal Arts and Social Sciences
- Faculty of Law, GIMPA
- School of Technology
- School of Research and Graduate Studies

== GIMPA Business School (GBS) ==
=== Undergraduate programmes ===
- Bachelor of Accounting
- Bachelor of Finance
- Bachelor of Marketing
- Bachelor, Business Administration
- Bachelor of Human Resource Management
- Bachelor, Procurement, Logistics, and Supply Chain Management
- Bachelor, Hospitality And Tourism Management
- Bachelor, Project Management

=== Postgraduate programmes ===
- Certificate in Business Administration (CBA)
- Diploma In Management Studies (DMS)
- Diploma In Business Administration

=== Graduate programmes ===
- Master of Accounting and Finance
- Master of Human Resource Management
- Master of Marketing
- Master of Quality Management
- Master of Supply Chain Management (MSCM)
- Master of Project Management (MPM)
- Master of Natural Resource Accounting
- Executive Masters in Business Administration (EMBA)
- Master Of Business Administration (MBA)
- Master Of Research In Business Administration (MRes)

=== PhD Programs ===
- Doctor of Philosophy in Business Administration (PhD)
- Doctor of Management (DMGT)

== GIMPA School of Public Service and Governance,(SPSG) ==
=== Undergraduate programs ===
- Bachelor of Public Administration

=== Graduate programs ===
- Public Sector Management Training Programme (PSMTP)
- Masters in Public Health (MPH)
- Master of Philosophy in Public Administration (MPA)
- Master of Public Administration
- Master of Philosophy in Development Finance
- Master of Philosophy in Governance & Leadership
- Master of Development Management (MDM)
- Master Of Arts In International Relations And Diplomacy (MAIRD)
- Masters In Regional Integration And African Development (MAIRD)
- MSc Environmental Studies And Policy (ESP)
- Executive Masters In Governance & Leadership (Emgl) & Executive Masters In Public Administration (EMPA)

=== PhD Program ===
Ph.D. Program In Public Administration, Policy And Governance

== Faculty of Law, GIMPA ==
The faculty of law at GIMPA was established in 2010 and has quickly grown from its small size of about seventy students and five full-time faculty to over four hundred students and twenty-six full-time faculty in addition to fourteen adjuncts. Faculty of Law, GIMPA brag of the first and only ultra modern moot court facility in Ghana.

- LL.B Day Programme
- LL.B Regular Programme
- LL.B Modular Programme

=== Law Library & Centres ===
- Law Library
- Atta Mills Centre for Law & Governance
- SKB Asante Center for International Negotiations & Mediation

== GIMPA School of Technology (SOT) ==
=== Undergraduate Programmes ===
- BSc Information and Communication Technology (BSc ICT) [Daytime and Evening Sessions]
- BSc Computer Science (BSc CS) [Daytime and Evening Sessions]
- BSc Management Information Systems (BSC MIS) [Daytime and Evening Sessions]
- BSc. Health Informatics [Daytime and Evening Sessions]
- Diploma in Applied Computer Science (Day Session)

=== Masters Programmes (Evening and Modular Sessions) ===
- Master of Philosophy MIS (MPhil MIS) [Evening and Modular Sessions]
- Master of Philosophy ICT (MPhil ICT) [Evening and Modular Sessions]
- Master of Science MIS (MSc MIS) [Evening, Weekend and Modular Sessions]
- Master of Science ICT (MSc ICT) [Evening, Weekend and Modular Sessions]
- Master of Philosophy in Information Systems (MPhil IS) [Evening and Modular Sessions]
- MSc. IT & Law [Evening, Weekend and Modular Sessions]
- MSc. Digital Forensics and Cybersecurity [Evening, Weekend and Modular Sessions]
- MSc. Applied Mathematics [Evening, Weekend and Modular Sessions]

=== Postgraduate Programmes ===
- Post-Graduate Diploma ICT (PD ICT) [Evening and Weekend Sessions]
- Post-Graduate Diploma MIS (PD MIS) [Evening and Weekend Sessions]

=== Certificate and Short Courses ===
- Certificate in ICT (CICT)[Daytime, Evening and Weekend Sessions]
- Mature Entrance Course [Daytime, Evening and Weekend Sessions]

== School of Liberal Arts and Social Sciences ==
- MSc in Economic Policy
- MSc in Financial Economics
- MSc in Energy Economics
- Mphil in Economics
- Bachelor of Science in Hospitality Management

=== Short Programs ===
- Certificate in Hospitality and Tourism Management
- Certificate in Hotel Management
- Certificate in Housekeeping Management
- Certificate in English Proficiency Course

== School of Research and Graduate Studies ==
- The Environment and Natural Resource Research Initiative (ENRRI – EfD Ghana)

== University leadership ==
Rector	Tenure of Office
E. V. Mamphey	1965–1968
E. A. Winful	1968–1972
James Nti	1972–1977
Nicholas T. Clerk	1977–1982
R. K. O. Djang	1982–1986
T. B. Wereko	1986–1999
Stephen Adei	1999–2008
Yaw Agyemang Badu	2008–2012
Franklin A. Manu	2012–2017
Philip Ebow Bondzi-Simpson	2017–2021
Samuel Kwaku Bonsu	2021–present

== Notable alumni ==
- Misbahu Mahama Adams - MP for Mion
- Dennis Dominic Adjei - supreme court judge
- Kenneth Gilbert Adjei – Minister of Works and Housing
- Raymond Atuguba – Director of Legal Education
- Alban Bagbin – Speaker of Parliament of Ghana
- Gifty Afenyi-Dadzie – The first woman to be appointed president of the Ghana Journalist Association (GJA) and the longest-serving official in that position
- Patrick Amoah-Ntim – Ghanaian diplomat
- Roland Agambire – CEO of Agams Holdings and chairman and CEO of the ICT company Rlg Communications
- Charles Agyin-Asare – Founder of Perez Chapel International and Precious TV
- David Asante-Apeatu – former Inspector General of Police
- Samuel Kwame Adibu Asiedu – Justice of the Supreme Court of Ghana
- Nana Akuoko Sarpong – Paramount Chief of Agogo, ex-PNDC Secretary and former Member of Parliament
- Akua Sena Dansua– Former Member of Parliament for North Dayi, former Minister of Women and Children Affairs, Youth and Sports and Tourism
- Edith Dankwa - magazine and newspaper publisher
- Abiana – Musician and songwriter
- Afia Pokua – Ghanaian media personality
- Mimi Areme – Miss World 2010 (1st Runner Up Beauty with A Purpose, Miss Ghana 2009)(Winner)
- Theresa Lardi Awuni –Member of Ghana Parliament for Okaikwei North Constituency
- Samira Bawumia – Second Lady of Ghana
- Becca – Musician, singer, songwriter and actress
- Aliu Mahama – 4th Vice President of the Republic of Ghana(3rd Vice President of the 4th Republic)
- Lordina Mahama – the former First Lady of Ghana (2012–2017)
- D. K. Mensah – banker, former CEO of the Ghana Association of Banks
- Daniel McKorley – McDan Group of Companies
- Pearl Nkrumah – banker, Chairperson of the Ghana Stock Exchange
- Kojo Oppong Nkrumah – Minister of Information and MP for Ofoasi/Ayirebi
- Paskal A. B. Rois, Honrorary Consul of Indonesia to Ghana
- Imoro Yakubu Kakpagu – Member of Ghana Parliament for Kumbungu (Jan 2009 -Jan 2013)
- Kwame Anyimadu-Antwi - Member of Ghana Parliament for Asante Akim-Central
- John Dumelo – Ghanaian Actor, Politician, and Farmer.
- Yvonne Nelson – Ghanaian Actress, Model, Film producer, and Entrepreneur.
- Issah Adam Yakubu – Chief of Naval Staff

== Research and advocacy ==
- Centre for Health Systems and Policy Research (CHESPOR)
- Centre for Learning on Evaluation and Results (CLEAR)
- Centre for Management Development (CMD)
- Centre for IT Development (CITD)
- African Centre of International Criminal Justice (ACICJ)
- Gender and Development Resource Centre (GDRC)
- Centre for West African Studies (CWAS)
- African Centre on Law and Ethics
- Management Development Institute
- Academy of Leadership and Executive Training (ALET)

== See also ==
- List of universities in Ghana
