= Pascale Allotey =

Ghanaian public health researcher

Pascale Adukwei Allotey
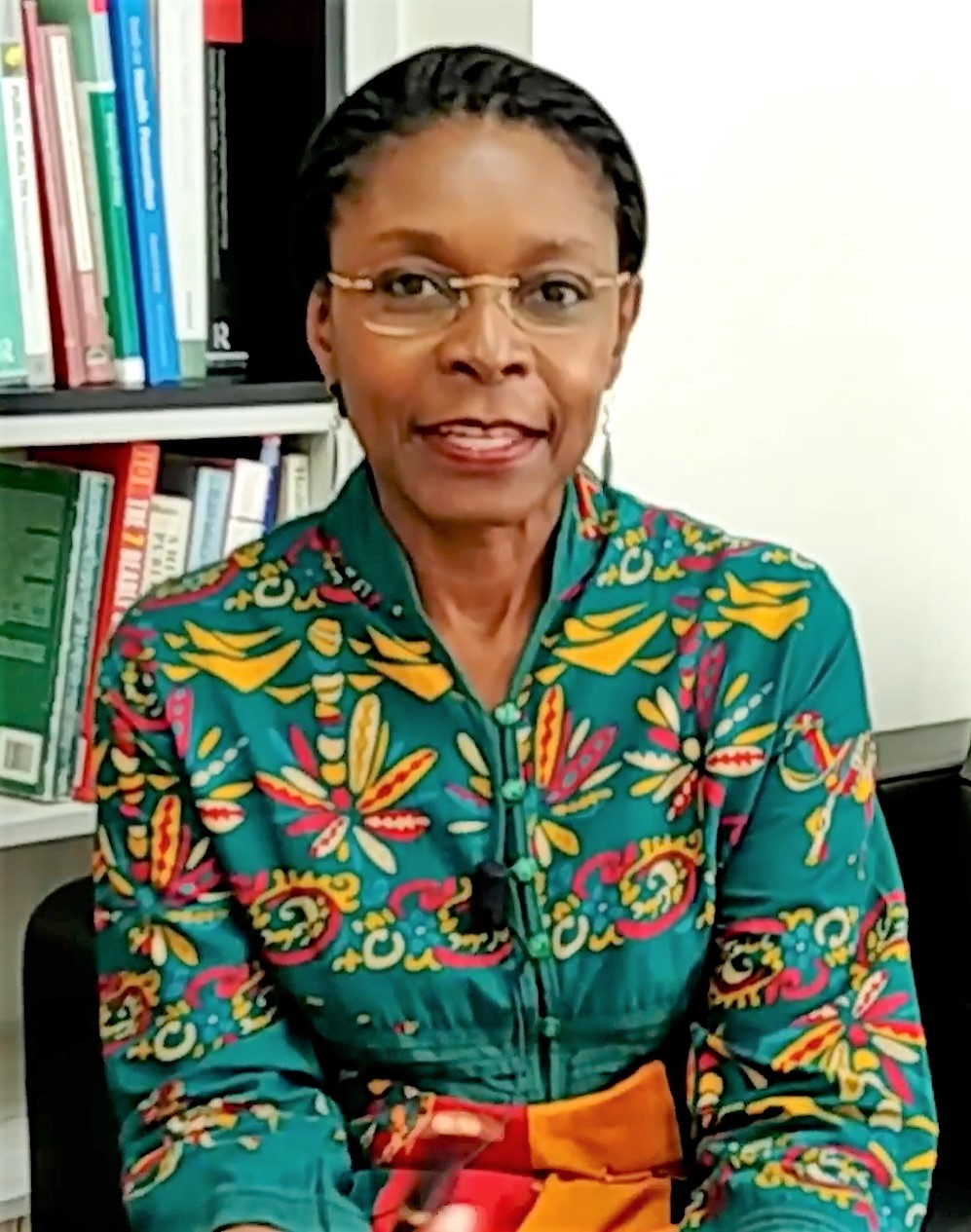
- Allotey speaks at UNU-MERIT in 2018
- Born: Morocco
- Education: University of Western Australia
- Scientific career
- Workplaces: World Health Organization; United Nations University; Monash University; Brunel University; University of Melbourne; University of Queensland
- Thesis: The burden of illness in pregnancy in rural Ghana : a study of maternal morbidity and interventions in Northern Ghana (1996)

Pascale Allotey is a Ghanaian public health researcher and the Director of the World Health Organization SRH/HRP. Her research focuses on addressing equity, human rights, and social justice as these relate to health and disease, health systems, and global health research. She has held various technical advisory positions for the World Health Organization. Allotey serves on the Paris Institute for Advanced Study World Pandemic Research Network to understand the societal impacts of the COVID-19 pandemic, the Governance of the World Health Summit and the international Advisory Board of The Lancet.

== Early life and education ==
Allotey was born in Morocco and spent her childhood in Ghana and the United Kingdom. Her parents are from Ghana, and her father was a career diplomat. She has said that her earliest ambition was to be a singer or a physician. When she was a teenager her father was arrested by militia forces during a political transition, and Allotey remembers hiding under her bed as the soldiers entered their home. The work of her parents inspired her lifelong career in engaging directly with communities to inform research and policy. She first studied psychology and nursing at the University of Ghana. She trained and registered as a nurse, public health nurse and a midwife in Ghana in 1988. In 1990 Allotey moved to Australia to further her university studies. Here she completed a postgraduate diploma and master's degree in public and community health at the University of Western Australia. She remained there for her doctoral studies, earning a doctoral degree in public health in 1996. As part of her doctoral research, she returned to Ghana, where she investigated why women did not attend antenatal clinics and what support they accessed as an alternative, particularly with co-morbidities of tropical diseases during pregnancy. She studied both the implementation of the safe motherhood initiative in antenatal health services and the practices of traditional healers and soothsayers.

== Research and career ==
Allotey started her academic career as a research fellow in public health, first at the University of Western Australia and then at the University of Queensland. In 1997, Allotey was invited by the World Health Organization Special Programme for Research and Training in Tropical Diseases (TDR) to join their gender task force. In this capacity she contributed to the analysis of the impact of gender on various tropical diseases. She also investigated the physical and mental health of refugees, and the implications of their health on their communities. She studied the prevalence of female genital mutilation in Ghana and Australia, and proposed that solutions must focus on enhancing women's rights and autonomy and promoting their agency to address the practice, rather than only focusing on the specific harm. She worked with the TDR again from 2006, when she was appointed to the Scientific and Technical Advisory Committee, and has since held various other technical advisory roles with the WHO. Around this time, Allotey moved to the United Kingdom and joined Brunel University London as Professor of Race, Diversity and Professional Practice. At Brunel, Allotey established one of the UK's first doctoral programmes in public health.

In 2009 Allotey moved to Monash University Malaysia as Professor of Public Health at the Jeffrey Cheah School of Medicine. Her research has considered the relationships between gender, equity, human rights, marginalisation and global health, with a focus on tropical health and non-communicable diseases. She has investigated how gender enables the Sustainable Development Goals, and how to engage with communities to co-produce research and influence policy related to their health. Together with Daniel Reidpath she founded the South East Asia Community Observatory (SEACO), a health and demographic surveillance system that was established in 2011. SEACO was supported by Monash University Malaysia, and looked to better understand how the rapidly changing population was impacting public health in Malaysia.

In 2016 Allotey was part of the team led by WHO TDR to launch an implementation research based massive open online course which focused on the infectious diseases of poverty. The course looks to train public health researchers and disease control programme managers in how to improve health outcomes. Allotey was appointed to the Paris Institute for Advanced Study World Pandemic Research Network (WPRN) in May 2020. The WRPN was established in response to the SARS-CoV-2 crisis, and served to collate research and resources on the societal impact of the COVID-19 pandemic.

== Selected publications ==
- Reidpath, D; Allotey, P (2003-05-01). "Infant mortality rate as an indicator of population health". Journal of Epidemiology and Community Health. 57 (5). BMJ Group: 344–6. doi:10.1136/jech.57.5.344. OCLC 677482202. PMC 1732453. PMID 12700217.
- Reidpath, Daniel D.; Chan, Kit Y.; Gifford, Sandra M.; Allotey, Pascale (2005). "'He hath the French pox': stigma, social value and social exclusion". Sociology of Health & Illness. 27 (4): 468–489. doi:10.1111/j.1467-9566.2005.00452.x. hdl:10536/DRO/DU:30008821. ISSN 1467-9566. PMID 15998347.
- Manderson, Lenore; Allotey, Pascale (2003-01-01). "Storytelling, marginality, and community in Australia: How immigrants position their difference in health care settings". Medical Anthropology. 22 (1): 1–21. doi:10.1080/01459740306767. ISSN 0145-9740. PMID 12641294. S2CID 39802179.

== Personal life ==
Allotey is married to Daniel D. Reidpath, the Senior Director for Health Systems and Population Health at the International Centre for Diarrhoeal Disease Research, Bangladesh.
