= Gambling Regulatory Authority of Ireland =

Irish government agency

The Gambling Regulatory Authority of Ireland (Irish: Údarás Cearrbhachais na hÉireann) is an independent government agency formed to regulate gambling in Ireland. It was established under the Gambling Regulation Act 2024 and became operational from 5 March 2025, and industry members will come under its remit as they are licensed over time.

== Responsibilities ==
The Gambling Regulatory Authority of Ireland is mandated to regulate gambling online and in person in Ireland with the exception of the National Lottery, which has its own regulator. It issues gambling licences to gambling providers, who then have the responsibilities set out for licence-holders.

The three types of licences available are:

1. Business to consumer
2. Business to business
3. Charitable

The authority is additionally tasked with introducing schemes to protect children as well as adults with gambling problems.

Early activities of the authority have included investigating illegal gambling activities in Ireland's pubs. The authority met with two trade organizations, the Vintners' Federation of Ireland and the Licensed Vintners Association, to advise their members about illegal gambling and its legal consequences under the Gambling Regulation Act 2024.

== Governance ==
The authority's governing team, which shares its name with the overall agency, consists of seven people, no fewer than three being men and three women, of which some should have experience in the treatment of gambling addition, financial services, and consumer affairs. Members are appointed by the Minister for Justice. Currently the authority include:

The current authority's members are:

- Paul Quinn (chairperson) - former CEO, Office of Government Procurement at the Department of Public Expenditure, NDP Delivery and Reform
- Celene Craig - former Commissioner at Coimisiún na Meán and former CEO at the Broadcasting Authority of Ireland
- Marion Kelly - CEO and Board Member of the Irish Banking Culture Board
- Rita Purcell - deputy CEO of Finance, International and Legal, at the Health Products Regulatory Authority
- David Hickson - financial controller at the Community Foundation of Ireland
- Michael McGrath - practising barrister, fellow of the Chartered Institute of Arbitrators
- Dr. Colin O’Driscoll - senior psychologist and clinical lead for the HSE’s Mid-West Addiction Services and fellow of the Psychological Society of Ireland

Operations are managed by a management team of five, led by a CEO.
