= Rlg Communications =

Rlg Communications Co. Ltd.
- Company type: Private ownership
- Industry: Consumer Electronics; Training and Education; Social Development; ICT; Technology Solutions
- Founded: 2001
- Founder: Roland Agambire
- Headquarters: Dubai, United Arab Emirates, UAE
- Number of locations: List: Dubai (United Arab Emirates) Ghana Nigeria Gambia China Angola South Africa Kenya Rwanda
- Area served: Worldwide, Africa particularly
- Key people: Roland Agambire (CEO)
- Products: Mobile Phones and Laptops, Tablets, Managed Services, Electronic Gadgets
- Revenue: ▲US$ 1.7 billion (2015) ▼US$ 1.2 billion (2016) ▲US$ 1.3 billion (2017) ▲US$ 1.5 billion (2018)
- Number of employees: 2,500 (2015)
- Divisions: Rlg Institute of Technology; Rlg Security
- Website: www.rlgglobal.com

Rlg Communications was a Ghanaian ICT company with headquarters in Dubai-United Arab Emirates. It started with the incorporation of a company called Roagams Link Ghana Ltd now Rlg Communications (Ghana) Limited, as the leading Ghanaian computer and handset manufacturing company. The company is the first indigenous African company to assemble laptops, desktops and mobile phones and offer ICT training in computer and phone repairs. The company is modeled to generate mass, high-skilled employment for African youth and meet the rising demand for computers and other ICT devices.

== Chairman & CEO ==
Mr. Roland Agambire Established Roagam Links in March 2001, then as a mobile phone repair outlet transforming later to become the pioneer indigenous ICT manufacturing, assembling and training firm in Ghana, Rlg Communications Limited now Rlg Communications (Ghana) Limited, a member of the Rlg Group of Companies Limited (Rlg Group). The Rlg Group currently has presence in China, Dubai, UAE, Nigeria, Angola, Kenya and the Gambia, South Africa, Ghana, Rwanda and still expanding.

== E-commerce platform ==
Rlg Communications with the boom of the digital era, established an online platform to sell its own products online. The eCommerce business revenue picked up the revenue of the company with card payments and cash on delivery worldwide. At the 1st Electronic Transaction and Commerce Summit in the United Arab Emirates (UAE) organized by the Telecommunications Regulatory Authority - TRA, regulators of the telecom sector, Rlg Communications was awarded by the TRA for technological innovation in the African region.

== Partnership ==
Rlg Communications partners Microsoft to provide the company with the firmware for their Uhuru range of computers. The range runs on Windows 8 operating system.

== New project ==
The company aimed to build Ghana's first technology park, Hope City, in March 2013. The city was planned to have Africa's tallest building when completed. The project was estimated to cost 10 billion dollars, however as of today the project has not been built.

== Awards ==
The company has won some awards for its work:

- PricewaterhouseCoopers award for the 3rd Most Respected Company in Ghana.
- Ghana Club 100's award for Best Entrant into the Club.
