= Baffour Adjei-Bawuah =

Ghanaian diplomat (born 1942)

Amb. Barfuor Adjei-Barwuah
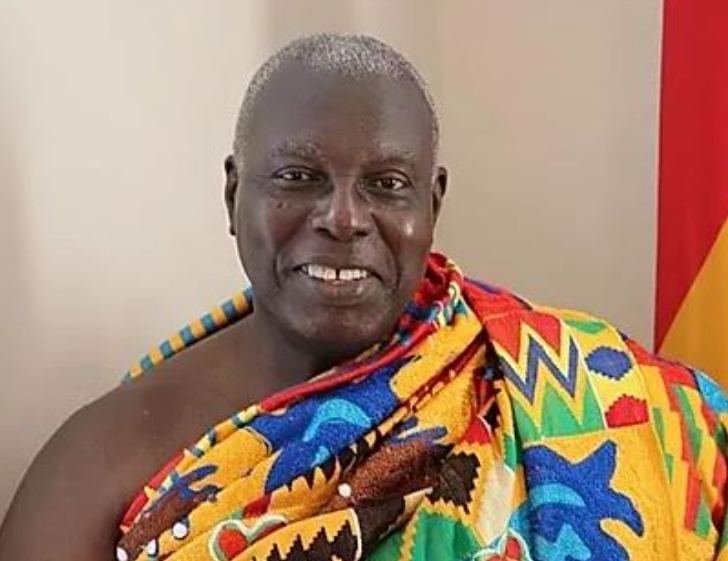

Ambassador of the Republic of Ghana to the United States
- In office June 2017 – June 2021
- President: Nana Akuffo-Addo
- Preceded by: Joseph Henry Smith
- Succeeded by: Alima Mahama (Hajia)

Ghana Ambassador Japan
- In office 2002–2008
- President: John Kufuor
- Preceded by: Togbui Kporku III
- Succeeded by: Kwame Asamoah Tenkorang

Personal details
- Born: 15 December 1942 (age 83) Kumasi, Gold Coast
- Party: New Patriotic Party
- Education: Prempeh College; University of Ghana; University of Wisconsin; Indiana University
- Occupation: Diplomat

Barfuor Adjei-Barwuah (born 15 December 1942) is a Ghanaian diplomat and a member of the New Patriotic Party of Ghana. He was Ghana's ambassador to United States of America from 2017 to 2021.

== Early life and education ==
Barfuor was born on 15 December 1942 in Kumasi, Gold Coast. He had his secondary education at Prempeh College completing in 1965. He continued to the University of Ghana, Legon where he earned a B.A. in geography in 1965. He proceeded to the United States of America later on to pursue his master's degree in Geography at the University of Wisconsin–Milwaukee graduating in 1968 and his PhD in geography at the Indiana University Bloomington graduating in 1972. His dissertation was entitled "Socio-economic regions in the Louisville ghetto". He also co-authored the paper "Some comparative aspects of the West African Zongo and the Black American Ghetto" with Harold M. Rose.

== Career ==
After completing his studies abroad, he returned to Ghana to work as a lecturer and a research fellow at the University of Ghana while working part-time as a television host with the Ghana Broadcasting Corporation from 1972 to 1975. He worked for eight years as the executive director of the Ghana Tourist Board from 1975 to 1983 then left Ghana for the United Kingdom. Four years later he was employed as a community liaison officer in Kent, England, he served in this position for a year. In 1989 he earned a certificate in counselling from the Center for Advancement in Counselling in London. Barfuor was employed as a senior lecturer at Bexley College, London working in the field of adult education from 1989 to 1991. He was head of faculty access and development at Hackney Community College from 1991 to 1993. From 1993 to 2001, he worked as the lead adviser at the Learning and Skills Development Agency, a publicly funded organization that supported continuing education in England. As advisor, he provided consultancy and training to many institutions in Ghana, England, and Wales.

== Political career ==
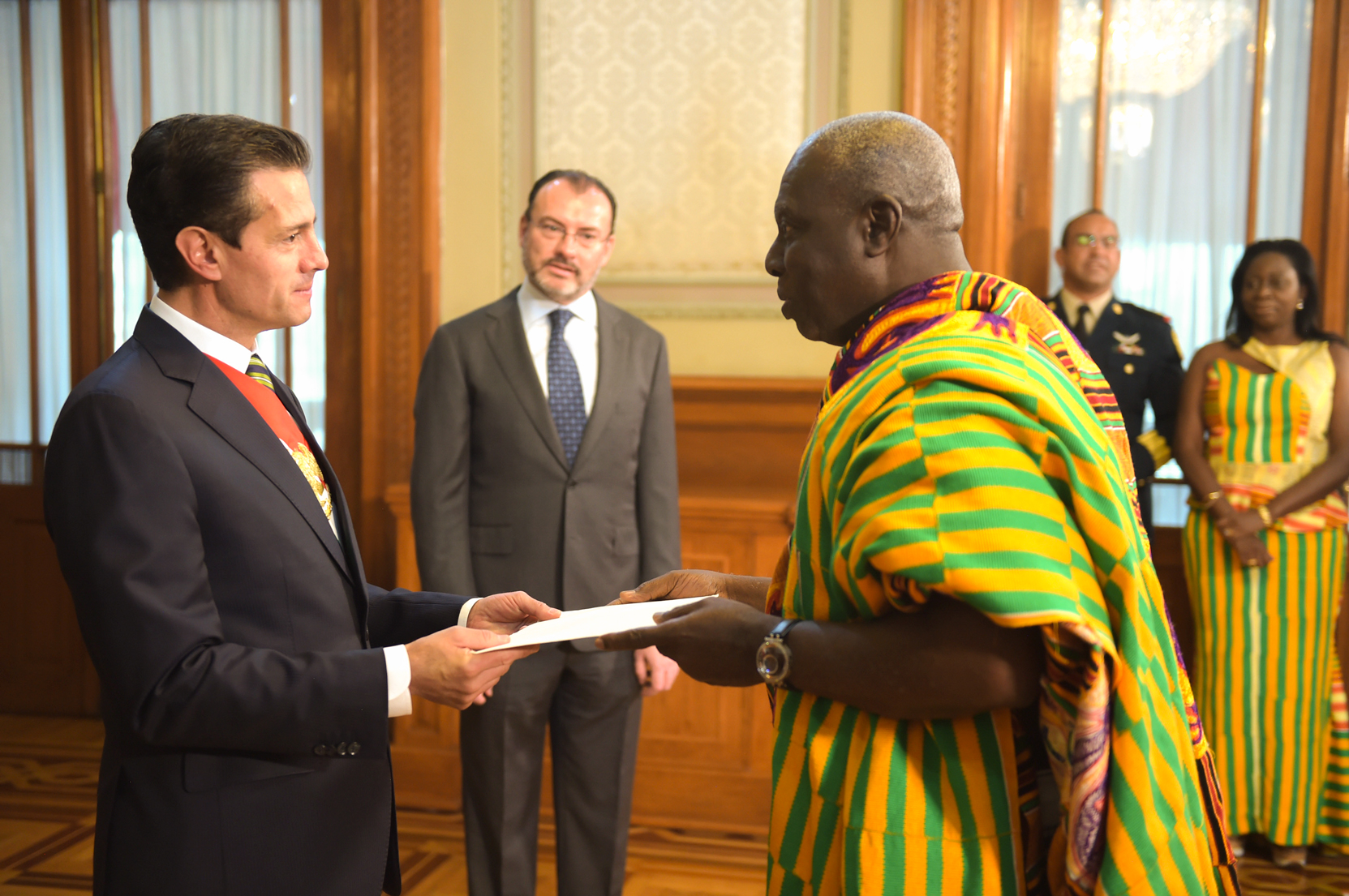
Baffour Adjei Bawuah with President Enrique Peña Nieto of Mexico when he received the credentials of new Ambassadors

He returned to Ghana in 2001, a few months after the New Patriotic Party had won the 2000 presidential elections. A year later he was appointed Ghana's ambassador to Japan with concurrent accreditation to Australia, New Zealand, Papua New Guinea, and Singapore. He served in this capacity for seven years, leaving temporarily in September 2007 to contest as a presidential aspirant for the New Patriotic Party, and leaving permanently before Ghana's 2008 presidential election, which the NPP lost.

In October 2009, he was accused of misappropriation funds donated by a Japanese chocolate manufacturer. He denied the allegations levelled against him and suffered no legal consequences. He returned to the United Kingdom in 2013 and worked for three years as co-chair of Charles Chanan, Ltd, an executive search firm in London. In 2017 he was appointed Ghana's ambassador to the United States of America by the current President of the republic of Ghana, Nana Akufo-Addo.

== Ambassadorial appointment ==
In June 2017, President Nana Akuffo-Addo named Baffour Adjei Bawuah as Ghana's ambassador to United States of America. He was among 22 other distinguished Ghanaians who were named to head various diplomatic Ghanaian mission in the world.

== Personal life ==
Barfuor Adjei-Barwuah and his wife, Dinah Barfuor-Barwuah, have four children.
