= Access Bank Ghana Plc =

Ghanaian commercial bank

Coordinates: 05°33′09″N 00°11′24″W

- Type: Public
- Traded as: GA: ACCESS
- Industry: Financial services
- Founded: 2009; 17 years ago
- Headquarters: Osu, Accra, Ghana
- Key people: Ama Bawuah (chairperson} Olumide Olatunji (managing director and CEO); Pearl Nkrumah (executive director)
- Products: Loans, transaction accounts, savings, investments, debit cards
- Revenue: ▲ Pretax: GHS: 1.613 billion (US$106.5 million) (2023)
- Total assets: GHS: 12.30 billion (US$812 million) (2023)
- Parent: Access Bank Group
- Website: Homepage

Access Bank Ghana Plc, formerly Access Bank Ghana Limited, is a full service commercial bank in Ghana, licensed by the Bank of Ghana, the central bank and national banking regulator.

== Location ==
The headquarters and main branch of the bank are located at Starlets 91 Road, Accra, Ghana. The geographical coordinates of the banks headquarters are:05°33'09.0"N, 0°11'24.0"W (Latitude:5.552500; Longitude:-0.190000).

== Overview ==
The bank offers universal banking services to institutional, corporate, commercial, and retail customers, across Ghana. As of December 2023, Access Bank Ghana had total assets of GHS:12.3 billion (US$812 million), with shareholders' equity of GHS:1.613 billion (US$106.5 million). The stock of the company is listed on the Ghana Stock Exchange, where it trades under the symbol: ACCESS.

- Note: US$1.00 = GHS15.15 on 25 June 2023 at: https://www.oanda.com/currency-converter/en/?

== Access Bank Group ==
Access Bank Ghana is a subsidiary and component of the Access Bank Group, a financial services conglomerate with headquarters in Nigeria and subsidiaries in the Democratic Republic of the Congo, Gambia, Ghana, Kenya, Nigeria, Rwanda, Sierra Leone, Zambia and the United Kingdom. The group also maintains representative offices in China, India, United Arab Emirates and Lebanon. As of 31 March 2020, Access Bank Group was a large pan-African financial services organization with assets in excess of ₦7.28 trillion (US$18.82 billion).

== Ownership ==
The shares of stock of Access Bank Ghana are listed of the Ghana Stock Exchange where they trade under the symbol: ACCESS. The table below illustrates the shareholding in the company, as of 31 October 2017.

Access Bank Ghana Plc stock ownership
Rank	Name of owner	Percentage ownership
1	Access Bank Group	91.0
2	Other investors via Ghana Stock Exchange	9.0
	Total	100.00

== History ==
Access Bank Ghana became operational in 2009, with base capital of GH¢80 million. In March 2017, Access Bank Group completed an initial public offering (IPO) for its Ghana subsidiary, raising $6 million by selling a 6 percent stake.

In September 2022, Access Bank Ghana became the title sponsor of the Ghana Division One League (renaming the league as the Access Bank Division One League) as well as the official banking partner of the Ghana Football Association in a USD250,000 one-year deal. In November 2023, the title sponsorship was extended for three more seasons in a USD270,000 per season deal.

== See also ==
- List of financial institutions in Ghana
- Economy of Ghana
