= Assin District =

- Former District
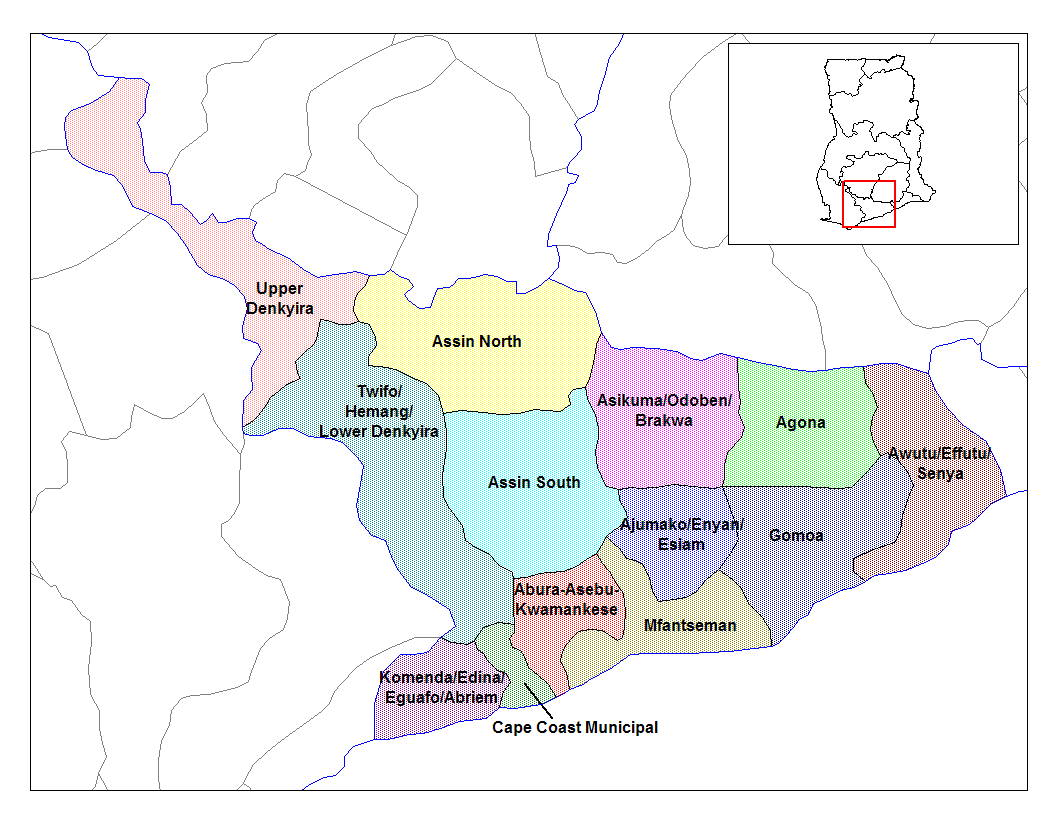
- Districts of Central Region

- Location of Assin District within Central
- Coordinates: 5°42′11.52″N 1°16′54.48″W
- Country: Ghana
- Region: Central
- Capital: Assin Fosu
- Time zone: UTC+0 (GMT)
- ISO 3166 code: GH-CP-AS

Assin District is a former district that was located in Central Region, Ghana. Originally created as an ordinary district assembly in 1988. However, in August 2004, it was split off into two new districts: Assin North District (now currently known as Assin Central Municipal District; capital: Assin Fosu) and Assin South District (capital: Nsuaem Kyekyewere). The district assembly was located in the northwest part of Central Region and had Assin Fosu as its capital town.

== Sources ==
- "Assin District". Statoids.
