= Alhaji (disambiguation) =

Alhaji may refer to someone with the honorific title Hajji. Alhaji is also a given name and may refer to:

- Alhaji (sultan), Sultan of Kano who reigned from 1648 to 1649
- Alhaji Usman Alhaji (born 1948), Nigerian politician and educationist
- Alhaji Issifu Azumah, Ghanaian politician
- Alhaji Lamrana Bah (died 2008), Sierra Leonean businessman
- Alhaji Barhath, 13th-century Indian poet and horse trader
- Alhaji Umar B. Bodinga, Ghanaian politician
- Alhaji Hassan Dalhat (born 1936), Nigerian bureaucrat and administrator
- Alhaji Gero (born 1993), Nigerian footballer
- Alhaji Grunshi, Ghanaian soldier in World War I
- Alhaji Habu Adamu Jajere, Nigerian businessperson
- Alhaji Jeng (born 1981), Gambian-Swedish pole vaulter
- Alhaji Kabe (died 1753), Sultan of Kano from 1743 to 1753
- Alhaji Kamara (born 1994), Sierra Leonean footballer
- Alhaji Bai Modi Joof (1933–1993), Gambian barrister
- Alhaji Mohammed (born 1981), American basketball player
- Alhaji Chief Mucktarru-Kallay, Sierra Leonean politician
- Alhaji Abdulai Salifu (born 1943), Ghanaian politician

== See also ==
- Alhaji (novel)
- Abubakar Alhaji, Nigerian administrator
