= Native Officer Ali =

Native Officer of the Gold Constabulary and Head of the Hausa community

Native Officer Ali

Native Officer Ali DCM, ADC (died 2 February 1908) was a military officer originally from Katsina. He served in the British colonial forces in West Africa, including the Hausa Constabulary, Gold Coast Constabulary and the Royal West African Frontier Force. On 26 October 1907, Governor of the Gold Coast, Sir John Pickersgill Rodger approved his recognition as Head Chief of the Hausa community (Sarkin Hausawa), following a petition submitted by representatives of the Hausa community on 20 September 1907. The approval was communicated through the Secretary for Native Affairs.

== Military Career 1863 – 1902 ==
During the expansion of the British colonial control in West Africa in 1863, Native Officer Ali enlisted in Glover Hausas, a military force established by John Hawley Glover. Ali served as a Sergeant Major commanding troops stationed at Assin Praso. Between 1875 and 1976, Ali and his fellow officers were sent to the United Kingdom for advanced military training prior to his commission as a Native Officer.

Ali contributed to further military campaign and expeditions in the Gold Coast (British colony). On 31 January 1885, Native Officer Ali and sixty Hausa troops landed and searched the island of Anyako from end to end before returning to Fort Prinzenstein in (Quittah) Keta that evening without casualties.

Native Officer Ali and other members of the Gold Coast Constabulary were presented with the Distinguished Conduct Medal by Acting Governor Frederick Mitchell Hodgson on 28 January 1890, for showing great courage and honorable conduct during the Awuna expedition on April 20, 1889.

After Ali's military expedition he served as Aide-de-camp to Gold Coast Governors Sir Matthew Nathan and Frederick Mitchell Hodgson. He continued his military career into the early twentieth century, serving with the 2nd Gold Coast Regiment until his retirement from active military service in June 1902.

== Leadership of the Hausa Community 1902 – 1908 ==
Following Native Officer Ali's retirement from the military service on 1 June 1902, he retained his rank and had the capacity to wear his military uniform. Ali settled in Accra, Ussher Town Horse Road where he established a residence in the Hausa settlement (Zongo), this location is where the Accra General Post Office remains to this day.

Although Native Officer Ali was not formally titled “Head of the Hausa Community” between 1902 —1906 by the colonial Government, Ali served as the principal representative of the Hausas. He functioned as an intermediary between the Hausa residents, local traditional authorities and the British colonial Government. Additionally, Ali was responsible for appointing leaders of the Hausa carriers and providing protection for porters during the transporting of goods between the interior and the coast of the Gold Coast colony.

Following disputes within the Muslim community over religious leadership and succession, Native Officer Ali and other migrant leaders met with the Governor, Sir Matthew Nathan and M.N Hull, the Secretary for Native Affairs on 27 January 1903. Their discussion resulted in the appointment of the highest Muslim religious leader, (Chief Imam). Mohammad Fulata Bornu was brought from Cape Coast to Accra and was appointed the highest Muslim religious leader of the Gold Coast colony on 21 February 1903. Native Officer Ali was one of the facilitators in efforts to resolve the leadership dispute and restore unity within the Muslim community.

On 20 September 1907, the Muslim Community led by the Highest priest, Mama Fulata Bornu from 1903 — 1909 together with leaders of the Hausa community, Mallam Abubakare (Priest), Mallam DanJimba (Priest), Native Officer Harri Zanuah of The Gold Coast Regiment and Mallam Bukare (Priest) petitioned through the Colonial Government to officially recognize Native Officer Ali as Head Chief of the Hausa Community (Sarkin Hausawa). The Hausa community stated,

"As Hausas we have so far been under a great disadvantage in having no head chief, and whenever it has been necessary to wait upon the Government, it has always been difficult to obtain a spokesman."

"We are writing solely on behalf of the Hausas residing here. We have nothing to do with the Yorubas or other tribes who have their own head-chiefs."

On 26 October 1907, the Hausa community request was approved by the Governor, John Pickersgill Rodger through Sir William Charles Fleming Robertson secretary for native affairs. Native Officer Ali held the position until his death on 2 February 1908.

== Death and legacy ==
Native Officer Ali died on 2 February 1908. He had served in the Hausa Constabulary, the Gold Coast Constabulary and the Royal West African Frontier Force as a Native Officer and earned the position of Native Officer-in-Chief of the Gold Coast Hausas.

Ali is regarded as one of the three prominent early migrant leaders in Ghana, alongside a Muslim scholar Mallam Naino and the merchant Chief Alhaji Brimah.

On 13 April 1909, a year after Native Officer Ali's death, his son Alhaji Mohammed Ali, (died 22 January 1948), emerged successor to his father's recognised leadership position. Mohammed Ali earned the honorific title "Alhaji" after completing Hajj. Representatives of the Hausa community, supported by Fulani religious leaders Mallam Osmanu and Mallam Bukari, formally petitioned for him through the Secretary for Native Affairs to succeed his father as head of the Hausa community.

Unlike is his father, Mohammed Ali was not gazetted by the Government, the colonial Government instead favored a centralized administrative framework under which a single head Chief represented the whole Muslim community, an office authorized to Chief Alhaji Brimah (serving 1909 – 1915). Even with the Government policy, community alignment remained divided along ethnocultural lines, groups such as the Fulani and Wangara rejected Chief Brimah's jurisdiction. Instead, they continued to recognize Chief Alhaji Mohammed Ali, son of Native Officer Ali as their head, describing him as an intelligent leader with whom they were "quite satisfied".
