= Sammy Gyamfi =

Ghanaian politician

Personal details
- Born: Samuel Gyamfi; 28 March 1989 (age 37) Sunyani, Ghana
- Party: National Democratic Congress
- Education: Kwame Nkrumah University of Science and Technology
- Occupation: Communications officer
- Profession: Lawyer

Sammy Gyamfi is a Ghanaian lawyer and politician. He is the current national communications officer for the National Democratic Congress (NDC).

In 2025, Gyamfi was appointed the acting chief executive officer of the Ghana Gold Board, the authority that buys, sells, exports, weighs, grades, assays and values precious minerals in Ghana.

== Early life and education ==
Gyamfi was born on 28 March 1989 to Nana Kofi Genfi, and hails from Wamfie in the Bono Region of Ghana.

His secondary education was at the St. James Seminary Secondary School. He went to the Kwame Nkrumah University of Science and Technology for his first degree.

== Politics ==
In 2018, Gyamfi contested for national communications officer during the NDC National Executive elections and won by beating his only contender, the then deputy communication director of the party, Fred Agbenyo, by 4,000 votes. Gyamfi got 6,225 out of 9,000 votes cast whilst Agbenyo got 2,225 votes. He was again re-elected in 2022 for another four years' tenure.

=== Controversies ===
In July 2023, Gyamfi alleged that the New Patriotic Party (NPP) had tried to bribe James Gyakye Quayson from contesting the Assin North Constituency by-election. He said the ruling party had threatened to jail Quayson after they failed to persuade him to step down.

In May 2025, Gyamfi was widely criticized after a video surfaced showing him handing money to evangelist Nana Agradaa. The gesture sparked controversy due to Agradaa's reputation and the public nature of the exchange. Gyamfi later confirmed that he had given her $800, and issued a public apology, describing it as "an unfortunate act of indiscretion." He explained that the money was a private gesture of kindness and expressed regret that it was misunderstood. He stated that she had requested it for fuel, and had later offered to refund it and even double the amount to protect Gyamfi's reputation.

== Career ==
Gyamfi was called to the bar on 5 October 2018 after he graduated from the Ghana School of Law.

== Personal life ==
Gyamfi is a Christian (Seventh Day Adventist Church). He is married.

He has been a practicing lawyer for many years in Ghana, and has been involved in several high-profile cases.

He has served in different leadership roles since his days in university.
