= Justice Ofori =

Ghanaian Chartered Insurer and former Commissioner of Insurance of Ghana

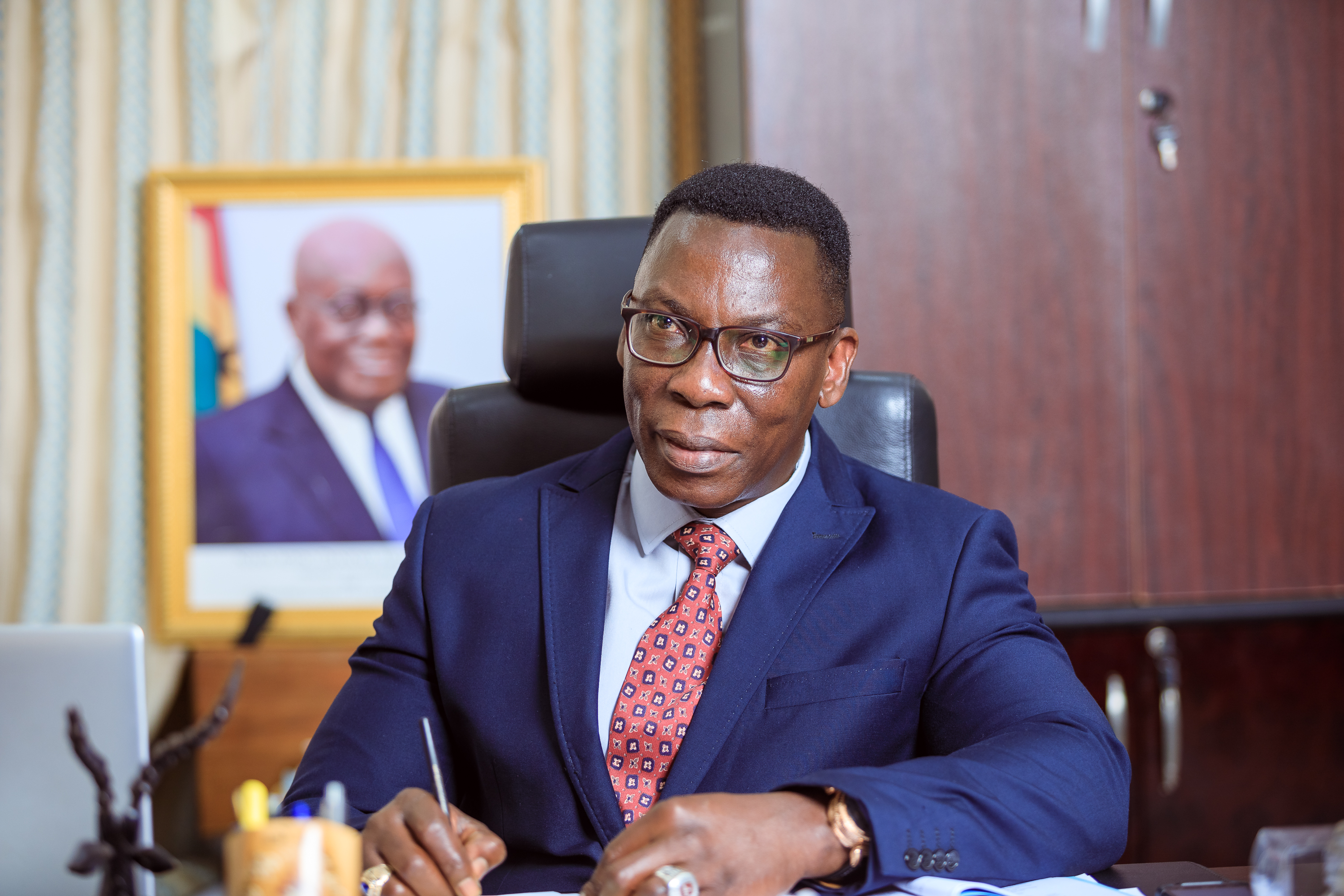
- Portrait of Dr Justice Ofori

Commissioner of Insurance of National Insurance Commission
- Incumbent
- Assumed office July 2017
- Appointed by: Nana Addo Dankwa Akufo-Addo
- Preceded by: Lydia Lariba Bawa

Personal details
- Education: University of Ghana
- Occupation: Chartered Insurer

Dr. Justice Yaw Ofori is a Ghanaian Chartered Insurance Professional and the current Commissioner of Insurance of the National Insurance Commission of Republic of Ghana since July 2017. He was appointed by Nana Addo Dankwa Akufo-Addo in 2017 to replace Ms Lydia Lariba Bawa.

== Education ==
Ofori had his primary education at Kotoka Primary School, Burma Camp and the proceeded to the Mpraeso Senior High School for his secondary education. He then moved to the University of Ghana, Legon, graduating with a BA (Hon) Degree in political science in 1988. He proceeded to the Toronto School of Business, Canada, to read a Diploma in Banking and Finance. He has degrees from the York University, Canada and the University of Toronto, Canada. He is certified in Management (CIM) by the Canadian Institute of Management and is a licensed Independent Adjuster, Ontario – Canada.

Ofori also has an International Executive MBA degree from the Paris Graduate School of Management and is a Chartered Insurance Professional (CIP). He is also a Fellow of the Insurance Institute of Canada (IIC) as well as a Fellow of the Chartered Insurance Institute of Ghana (CIIG).

Justice Ofori holds a Doctor of Business Administration degree from the Swiss Business School.

== Career ==
Ofori was the first Director of the Ghana Insurance College for 11 years and also a Senior Manager of Vanguard Assurance Company for two years. Justice Ofori currently serves on the board of the National Health Insurance Authority, the West African Insurance Institute Governing Board and is an Executive Committee Member of the ECOWAS Brown Card Council of Bureaux. He also chairs the Governing Council of the Ghana Insurance College.

=== Commissioner of Insurance ===
On July 12, 2017, Nana Addo Dankwa Akufo-Addo President of Ghana, appointed Dr. Justice Ofori as Commissioner of Insurance of Ghana.

== Awards ==
- Justice Ofori was adjudged the CEO of the year in 2021 at the Ghana Leadership Awards.
- In March 2022 Justice Ofori was inducted into the Prestigious Corporate Ghana CEOs Hall of Fame.

== Personal life ==
Justice Ofori is married to Jayne Ofori and have three children.
