= David Kaye (academic) =

American law professor & politician

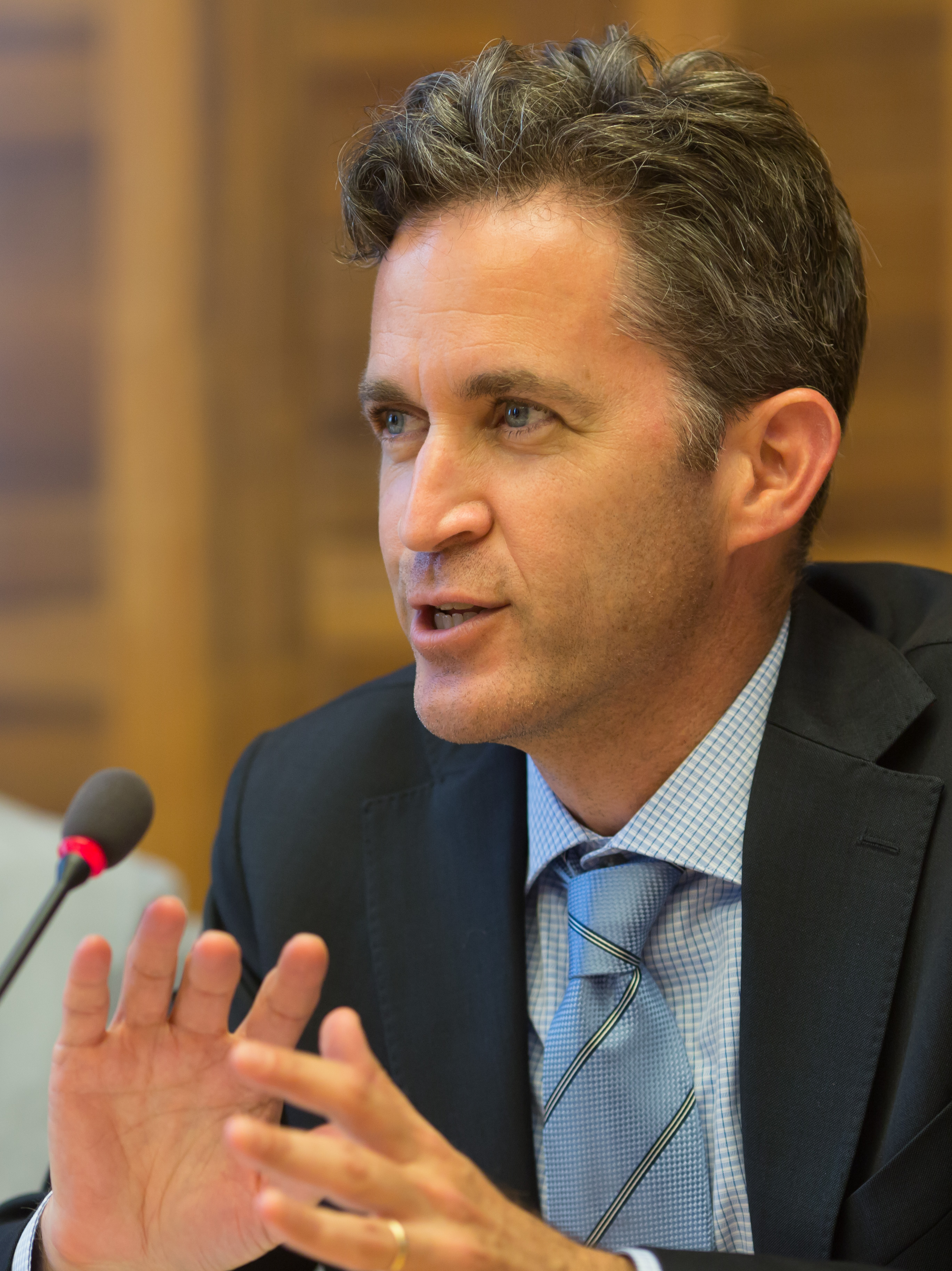
- Kaye in May 2015

UN Special Rapporteur on Freedom of Expression
- In office August 2014 – July 2020
- Preceded by: Frank William La Rue
- Succeeded by: Irene Khan

David Kaye is an American politician who served as the United Nations Special Rapporteur on the promotion and protection of the right to freedom of opinion and expression between August 2014 and July 2020, succeeded by Irene Khan.

Kaye is clinical professor of law at the University of California, Irvine on public international law, international humanitarian law human rights and international criminal justice. He is co-director of the UCI Fair Elections and Free Speech Center working at the intersection of technology, freedom of speech and democratic deliberation. He is also the independent board chair of the Global Network Initiative.

== Early life and career ==
Kaye’s early years took place in Conejo Valley during the 1970s and 80s, where he attended Westlake High School. His interest in immigrants fleeing persecution was sparked by Iranians moving into his local area due to the revolution of Iran when he was in the third grade. His undergraduate studies took place at UC Berkeley and, following law school, Kaye was employed by the State Department with a specific role working on disputes between the U.S. and Iran. In time, he moved on to nuclear non-proliferation issues and later onto international humanitarian law.

From 1995 to 2005, Kaye served in the Office of Legal Adviser at the State Department, where he was responsible for issues including human rights, international humanitarian law, the use of force, international organisations, and U.S. foreign relations law. During this time Kaye was also a legal adviser to the American Embassy in The Hague.

From 2005 to 2007, Kaye taught courses such as public international law, world trade, and comparative law at Whittier Law School, Costa Mesa. Kaye continued his teaching work at UCLA School of Law from 2007 to 2012, during which time he also founded and directed the first large human rights program and its clinic, and taught human rights law and international justice clinic courses focusing on accountability for serious human rights violations.

Kaye joined the faculty at the UC Irvine School of Law in 2012 as a clinical professor of law. In August 2014, David Kaye was appointed for his first term as United Nations Special Rapporteur on the promotion and protection of the right to freedom of opinion and expression.

As part of his role with the UN, Kaye monitored freedom of speech around the world. He received support from the University of California (Irvine) which received to this end several grants from the Ford Foundation, some of which were specifically designated to focus his work on online communications. He communicated with governments regarding human rights compliance and problematic legislation. Kaye conducted several official missions to areas including Japan, Tajikistan, Turkey, Mexico, Ecuador, Ethiopia and Liberia. The reporting that Kaye conducted for the UN has addressed topics including the protection of freedom of expression and the use of anonymity and encryption tools; the protection of fundamental freedoms of opinion for whistleblowers, special sources and journalists; how the use of Artificial Intelligence can impede and interfere with information sharing, individual agency, and the development of personal opinion; and the examination of the regulation of online content by social media and search companies.

Following his appointment to UN Special Rapporteur, Kaye became the founding Executive Director of the UCLA School of Law International Human Rights Program, where he directed the International Justice Clinic alongside teaching on international human rights law. Kaye is a guest author for Just Security. He is a member of the Council on Foreign Relations.

In October 2022, Kaye commented on the use of spyware in violation of international human rights law and called on governments to refrain from using it and to prohibit its sale to governments and others.

== Reports ==
=== Japan ===
In April 2016, Kaye presented his conclusions from conducting a week-long interview process on freedom of expression to the Foreign Correspondents’ Club of Japan in Tokyo. During the trip, Kaye engaged in dialogue with national authorities, non-governmental organisations, journalists, and media as part of his examination into the situation of freedom of expression in Japan. The process concluded that government pressure and potential bias were jeopardising Japan's media independence. Kaye further reported that the organisational structures in place within the media industry of Japan were compounding the situation and undermining journalists’ abilities to counter governmental pressures. Kaye highlighted the Broadcast Act as a main contributor to media regulation and a law that is enabling the state to adjudicate what constitutes political bias – consequently censoring or removing media privilege and licenses as the state perceives necessary.

Kaye went on to identify other worrying signals about Japan's record of freedom of expression in a 2017 report. The report noted concern over Japan’s mounting government pressure on the media, which was claimed to have led to a number of media retractions, restrictions on access to information, the removal of information from school textbooks, and resultant media self-censorship. Kaye's report was opposed by Junichi Ihara, Japan's ambassador to the UN.

=== Turkey ===
Following the attempted coup in Turkey, in July 2016, Kaye spent a week-long official visit to the country in November of the same year. The Office of the United Nations High Commissioner for Human Rights issued a news release citing Kaye's report, in which he highlighted that the anti-terrorism laws were regularly being used to criminalize reporting across all forms of media. Despite the state of emergency that the nation was said to be in at the time, Kaye's report noted several laws that were impeding freedom of expression and leading to the deterioration of stability and economic growth including the Anti-terrorism law, the Emergency Decrees, the criminalization of defamation of the President, and other Internet regulations. During the same visit, Kaye was permitted to visit five imprisoned detainees from the Cumhuriyet newspaper. His visitation to eight other writers and journalists were however curtailed by the Ministry of Justice.

=== Thailand ===
In response to the 2017 case of imprisoned Thai student activist, Jatupat Boonpatararaksa (who was awaiting trial for sharing a BBC News article on his private social media page regarding the new monarchy of King Maha Vajiralongkorn Bodindradebayavarangkun), Kaye underlined that the Thai Criminal Code provisions were incompatible with international human rights law and hold no place in a democratic country. The country still retains a provision within its Criminal Code known as Lesè-majesté, whereby defamation, insult or threat to the royal family carries a penalty of up to 15 years in prison. The article was considered insulting to the monarch and raised criticism of the public figure.

=== Iran ===
October 2018 saw Kaye present to the 3rd Committee of the United Nations General Assembly in New York regarding the ongoing harassment of BBC Persian journalists and their families by Iran. The BBC was said to have taken an 'unprecedented step' by appealing directly to the UN due to the levels of harassment their staff had been experiencing, but these appeals did not result in any action by the Assembly. Kaye's commentary garnered a strongly worded retort from Zahora Ershadi, Iran's delegate to the 3rd Committee, in which she stated that Iran had been a victim of "media warfare" by Britain and regretted that this was not recognized by Kaye.

=== Democratic Republic of the Congo ===
In December 2018 the Democratic Republic of the Congo (DRC) went to the polls to choose a new President. To preserve public order, the authorities issued an internet and text services blackout after false results were circulated on social media – leading to a postponement in results being shared. The network shutdown was in direct violation of international human rights - namely the transparent and free dissemination of information. A 2016 resolution, passed by the Human Rights Council, condemned measures preventing or disrupting access to the internet and sharing of information online. Kaye addressed the issue, citing reports indicating that the shutdown was curtailing the sharing of information between both electoral observers and witnesses from local centers and polling stations, and encouraged the authorities to "restore internet services as a matter of urgency and to ensure the integrity of fundamental democratic exercises [such as the vote]".

=== Ethiopia ===
In December 2019 marked the first visit of a UN Special Rapporteur to the country of Ethiopia since 2006, as David Kaye embarked upon a week-long visit. The country, known for its severe restrictions on media and free speech, has a history of prosecuting journalists under its 2009 anti-terrorism law; and a draft hate speech law, set before Ethiopian Parliament, refers to the criminalization of hate speech – presenting a real threat to the freedom of expression. Kaye noted that efforts to repeal the law had stalled in Parliament.

Prior to his visit, Kaye was said to have called on governments to "resist criminalizing [hate] speech except in the gravest situations" and presented several pending requests on torture to the Ethiopian government. Kaye additionally used his UN platform to urge the government not to weaponize internet shutdowns, in light of a brief shutdown of the state-owned Ethio telecom internet service provider during his own visit to the country. Kaye stated that officials had been unable to provide sufficient legal basis for the shutdowns.

=== Myanmar ===
In a joint report by UN experts, Kaye expressed concerns at the spike in civilian casualties and displacement in north-west Myanmar during the conflict between the Arakan Army and the state's military. The information blackout was directly linked to escalated levels of violence in the areas that suffered the shutdown, alongside a lack of precautions being taken to protect children and other civilians – in violation of international humanitarian law.

=== China ===
In June 2022, fifty independent United Nations human rights experts - including Kaye - published a statement on the situation of fundamental freedoms in China. According to the statement, independent UN observers had been expressing concerns to China for some time. The statement called on China to allow independent experts access to the country to conduct independent human rights monitoring missions. The same day, China declared the statement an interference in its internal affairs. Kaye expressed that the work of the human rights experts in no way contradicted the UN Charter or the concept of sovereignty. Human rights monitoring, he said, by its very nature involves investigating the internal affairs of states.

=== Ghana ===
In February 2019, Kaye, representing UN experts and special rapporteurs, cautioned the Ghanaian authorities that the global media's trust in government, particularly in respect of the suppression of freedom of expression, could only be rebuilt by an immediate and transparent investigation into the death of journalist Ahmed Hussein-Suale, and by bringing the criminals to justice. He warned that the perceived non-prosecution of criminal acts against journalists would have a significant adverse effect on the global freedom for the press and media. He stressed that labeling journalists as 'evil' or 'dangerous' and maligning their work affects their safety. He maintained that the killing of the investigative journalist Hussein-Suale was most likely the result of Kennedy Agyapong, Ghanaian parliament, disclosing his residential address and his publicly call to retribution, and insisted that any investigation into the killing of Hussein-Suale must take the impact of Agyapong's action into consideration.

== Selected publications ==
- Speech Police: The Global Struggle to Govern the Internet, Columbia Global Reports, 2019. ISBN 0999745484
