= Kobina Okyere =

Ghanaian politician (born 1948)

Member of Parliament for Assin South
- In office 7 January 1993 – 6 January 1997
- President: Jerry John Rawlings
- Parliamentary group: National Democratic Congress

Personal details
- Born: 28 December 1948 (age 77)
- Education: University of Cape Coast and University of Ife
- Occupation: Teacher

Kobina Okyere is a Ghanaian politician and member of the first parliament of the fourth republic of Ghana representing Assin South constituency under the membership of the National Democratic Congress (NDC).

== Early life and education ==
Kobina was born on 28 December 1948. He attended the University of Cape Coast and the University of Ife, where he obtained his Bachelor of Arts and Master of Arts in Education and Education Administration respectively. He worked as a teacher before going into parliament.

== Politics ==
He began his political career in 1992 when he became the parliamentary candidate for the National Democratic Congress (NDC) to represent his constituency in the Central Region of Ghana prior to the commencement of the 1992 Ghanaian parliamentary election.He was sworn into the First Parliament of the Fourth Republic of Ghana on 7 January 1993 after being pronounced winner at the 1992 Ghanaian election held on 29 December 1992.

After serving his four years tenure in office, Kobina lost his candidacy to his fellow party comrade Kwaku Al-Hassan Dadzie. He defeated New Patriotic Party member who polled 12,488 votes representing 36.00% of the total votes cast, Emmanuel Koomson of the Convention People's Party who polled 629 votes representing 1.80% of the total votes cast and Michael Damtse who polled 230 votes representing 0.70% of the total votes cast at the 1996 Ghanaian general elections. Kwaku polled 14,945 votes which was equivalent to 43.10% of the total valid votes cast. He was thereafter elected on 7 January 1997.
