= Assin South (Ghana parliament constituency) =

Constituency in the Central Region of Ghana

- constituency for the Parliament of Ghana
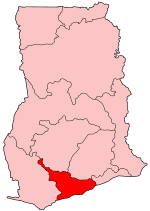
- District: Assin South District
- Region: Central Region of Ghana

Current constituency
- Party: New Patriotic Party
- MP: John Ntim Fordjour

Assin South is one of the constituencies represented in the Parliament of Ghana. It elects one member of parliament (MP) by the first past the post system of election. The Assin South constituency is located in the Assin South district of the Central Region of Ghana.

== Boundaries ==
The seat is located entirely within the Assin South district of the Central Region of Ghana.

== Members of Parliament ==
First elected	Member	Party
1992	Kobina Okyere	National Democratic Congress
1996	Kwaku Al-Hassan Dadzie	National Democratic Congress
2000	Dominic Kwaku Fobih	New Patriotic Party
2016	John Ntim Fordjour	New Patriotic Party

== Elections ==
2024 Ghanaian general election: Assin North
Party	Candidate	Votes	%	±%
NPP	John Ntim Fordjour	14,899	38.61	−0.64
NDC	Stephen Kofi Baidoo Jnr	13,354	34.61	11.23
Independent	Joseph Kofi Damtse	10,332	26.78	−9.44
Majority		1,545	4.00	0.97
Turnout		—	—	—
Registered electors		—		—

2020 Ghanaian general election: Assin North
Party	Candidate	Votes	%	±%
NPP	John Ntim Fordjour	17,121	39.25	−19.69
Independent	Joseph Kofi Damtse	15,801	36.22	+35.26
NDC	Nicholas Baffoe	10,201	23.38	−16.37
Ghana Union Movement	Adjei-banin George	499	1.14	—
Majority		1,320	3.03	−16.16
Turnout		—	—	—
Registered electors		—		—

2016 Ghanaian general election: Assin North
Party	Candidate	Votes	%	±%
NPP	John Ntim Fordjour	23,286	58.94	7.39
NDC	Sabina Appiah-Kubi	15,705	39.75	−6.78
Independent	Nana Nti Takra	378	0.96	—
CPP	Sankofie Abbam Lartey	142	0.36	0.19
Majority		7,581	-19.19	14.17
Turnout		39,887	71.66	−10.18
Registered electors		55,661		—

2012 Ghanaian general election: Assin North:
Party	Candidate	Votes	%	±%
NPP	Dominic Kwaku Fobih	19,834	51.55	−1.72
NDC	Sabina Appiah-Kubi	17,903	46.53	+1.51
PPP	Stephen Kofi Baidoo Jnr	521	1.35	—
NDP	Kofi Afran Adjei	109	0.28	—
CPP	Abbam Lartey Sankofie	64	0.17	−1.10
People's National Convention	Arhin Paul Essumang	44	0.11	—
Majority		1,931	5.02	−3.23
Turnout		40,365	81.84	9.48
Registered electors		49,320		—

2008 Ghanaian general election: Assin North:
Party	Candidate	Votes	%	±%
NPP	Dominic Kwaku Fobih	16,963	53.27	−9.63
NDC	Sabina Appiah-Kubi	14,335	45.02	11.62
CPP	Kwadwo Aduamoah	403	1.27	−1.63
DFP	Kenneth Gyasi	142	0.45	—
Majority		2,628	8.25	+1.58
Turnout		32,359	72.36	−14.84
Registered electors		44,717		—

2004 Ghanaian general election: Assin North:
Party	Candidate	Votes	%	±%
NPP	Dominic Kwaku Fobih	20,837	62.9	+32.6
NDC	Abraham Kwaku Fokuo	11,060	33.4	−4.08
CPP	Kwadwo Aduamoah	954	2.9	—
People's National Convention	Emmanuel Kwasi Wilson	288	0.9	—
Majority		9,777	29.5	+6.67
Turnout		33,860	87.2	+17.34
Registered electors		38,833		—

2000 Ghanaian general election: Assin North:
Party	Candidate	Votes	%	±%
NPP	Dominic Kwaku Fobih	16,140	60.30	16.16
NDC	Kwaku Al-Hassan Dadzie	10,031	37.48	−15.34
National Reform Party	Antwi Boasiako Boadi	593	2.21	—
Majority		6,109	22.83	14.15
Turnout		27,385	69.86	—
Registered electors		39,200		—

1996 Ghanaian general election: Assin North:
Party	Candidate	Votes	%	±%
NDC	Kwaku Al-Hassan Dadzie	14,945	52.82	
NPP	Dominic Kwaku Fobih	12,488	44.14	
People's Convention Party	Emmanuel Koomson	629	2.22	
NCP	Michael Damtse	230	0.81	
Majority		2,457	8.68	
Turnout				
Registered electors				

The 1992 Ghanaian parliamentary election was boycotted by the opposition parties. This led to a poor turnout of 28%.

1992 Ghanaian parliamentary election: Assin North:
Party	Candidate	Votes	%	±%
NDC	Kobina Okyere	8,356		
Majority				
Turnout		8,638		
Registered electors		34,772		

== See also ==
- List of Ghana Parliament constituencies
- Assin South District
