= Assin Central (Ghana parliament constituency) =

Constituency in the Central Region of Ghana

- constituency for the Parliament of Ghana
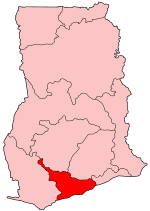
- District: Assin Central Municipal
- Region: Central Region of Ghana

Current constituency
- Party: National Democratic Congress
- MP: Nurien Shaibu Migyimah

Assin Central is one of the constituencies represented in the Parliament of Ghana. It elects one Member of Parliament (MP) by the first past the post system of election. Nurein Shaibu Migyimah is the member of parliament for the constituency. Assin Central is located in the Assin Central Municipal District of the Central Region of Ghana.

== Boundaries ==
The seat is located within the Assin North Municipal District of the Central Region of Ghana.

== Members of Parliament ==
Election	Member	Party
2012	Kennedy Agyapong (Former MP for Assin North)	New Patriotic Party
2016	Kennedy Agyapong	New Patriotic Party
2020	Kennedy Agyapong	New Patriotic Party
2024	Nurein Shaibu Migyimah	National Democratic Congress

== Elections ==
The table below shows the parliamentary election results for Assin Central constituency in the 2024 Ghanaian general election.

2024 Ghanaian general election: Assin Central Source:Ghana Home Page
Party	Candidate	Votes	%	±%
National Democratic Congress	Shiabu Migyimah	16,343	50.6%	—
New Patriotic Party	Godfred Anewu	15,926	49.4%	—
