= Atonsu (Central Region) =

Community in Central Region, Ghana

- Country: Ghana
- Region: Central Region
- District: Assin Central Municipal District

Atonsu is a town near Assin Fosu in the Assin Central Municipal District in the Central Region of Ghana. It is located along the Cape Coast-Fosu-Kumasi Highway.

== Institutions ==
- Atonsu Municipal Assembly Basic School

== Notable natives ==
- Stephen Adu Gyamfi
- Hymo
