= Frank William La Rue =

Guatemalan lawyer and civil liberties advocate

Frank La Rue
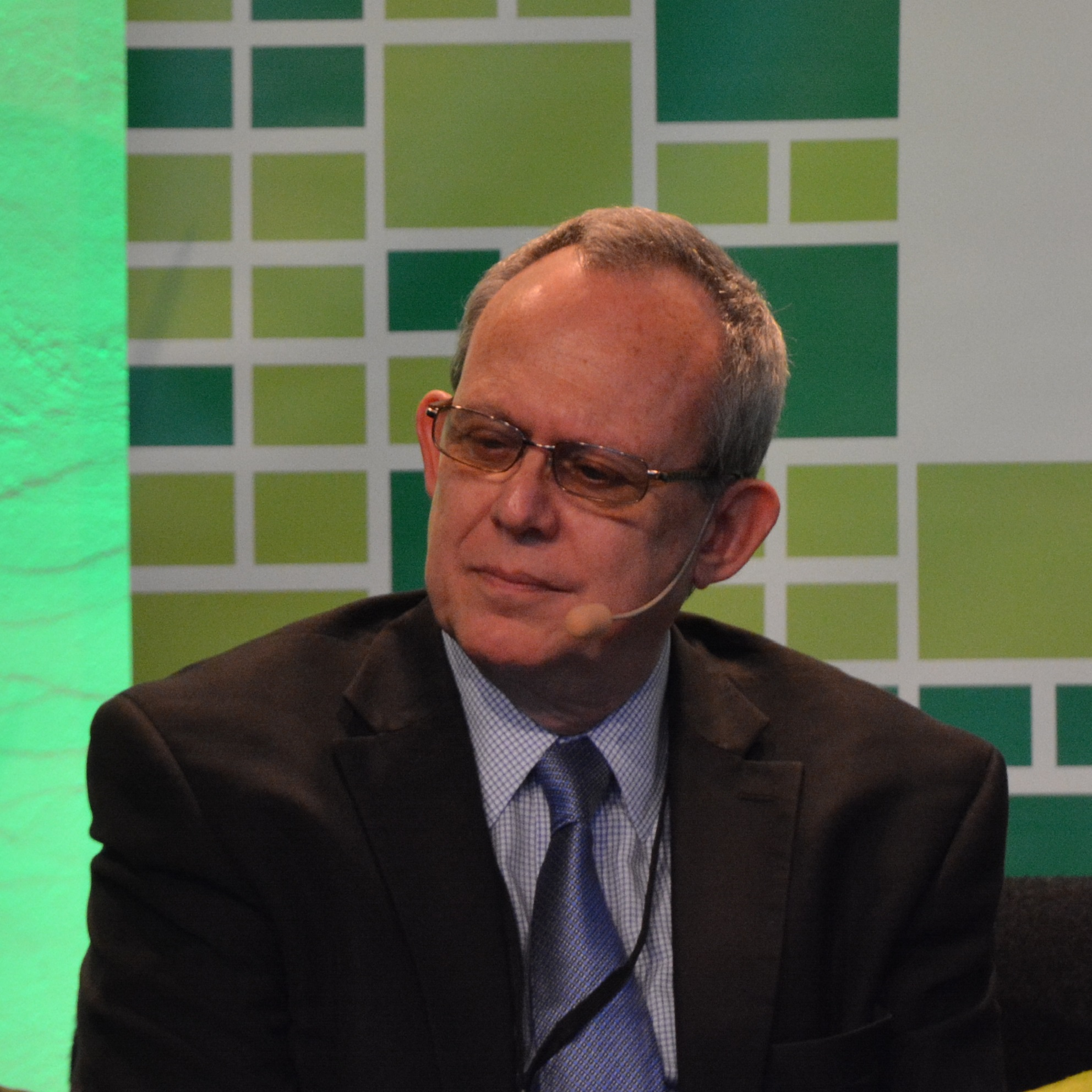
- La Rue in 2015

UN Special Rapporteur on Freedom of Expression
- In office August 2008 – July 2014
- Preceded by: Ambeyi Ligabo
- Succeeded by: David Kaye

Personal details
- Born: 1952 (age 73–74) Guatemala City, Guatemala
- Education: Universidad de San Carlos de Guatemala; Johns Hopkins University
- Website: caldh.org OHCHR Special Rapporteur

Frank La Rue (born 1952) is a Guatemalan labor and human rights law expert and served as United Nations Special Rapporteur on the promotion and protection of the right to freedom of opinion and expression, from August 2008 to August 2014.

Along with American human rights attorneys Anna Gallagher and Wallie Mason, La Rue is the founder of the Center for Legal Action for Human Rights (CALDH) and has been involved in the promotion of human rights for over 25 years. He was nominated for (but did not win) the 2004 Nobel Peace Prize by Mairead Corrigan, Northern Irish peace activist and 1976 laureate.

La Rue was previously the executive director of Robert F. Kennedy Human Rights Europe. He has also served as Assistant Director-General for Communication and Information at UNESCO.

== Biography ==
La Rue was born in Guatemala. Born legally blind, he nevertheless enrolled in and graduated from the Universidad de San Carlos de Guatemala with a law degree. La Rue served as legal adviser to the Central General de Trabajadores de Guatemala, the country's largest labor federation, from 1975 to 1980, during which time he had occasion to defend numerous labor union personnel and clergymen amid the country's worsening Civil War. He was consequently marked for death, and in 1981 he and his family sought exile in the United States. He served until 1989 as attorney and political analyst for numerous Guatemalan political exiles, including Rigoberta Menchú (1992 Nobel Peace Prize laureate), and in 1990 co-founded the Center for Legal Action for Human Rights (CALDH). LaRue obtained a postgraduate degree in U.S. foreign policy from Johns Hopkins University in 1985.

The 1993 Guatemalan constitutional crisis, triggered by President Jorge Serrano's self-coup, prompted La Rue to return to his country in 1994, where he reestablished CALDH in Guatemala. CALDH became the first Guatemalan NGO to bring cases of human rights violations to the Inter-American Commission on Human Rights. La Rue brought the first genocide cases against former Guatemalan military dictatorships by filing charges against General Fernando Romeo Lucas García in 2000, and against General Efraín Ríos Montt in 2001; these cases resulted in numerous threats and attacks against CALDH.

He directed a news magazine Debate (1998–2004); hosted numerous radio programs in the U.S. and Guatemala on the subject of political rights; participated in the Migrant Workers Rights Program at the University of Chicago in 2002; served as Presidential Commissioner for Human Rights in Guatemala for President Oscar Berger (2004–08); as Human Rights Adviser to the Minister of Foreign Affairs of Guatemala; President of the Governing Board of DEMOS (the Central American Institute for the Study of Social Democracy); and as consultant to the Office of the UN High Commissioner for Human Rights.

== Career ==
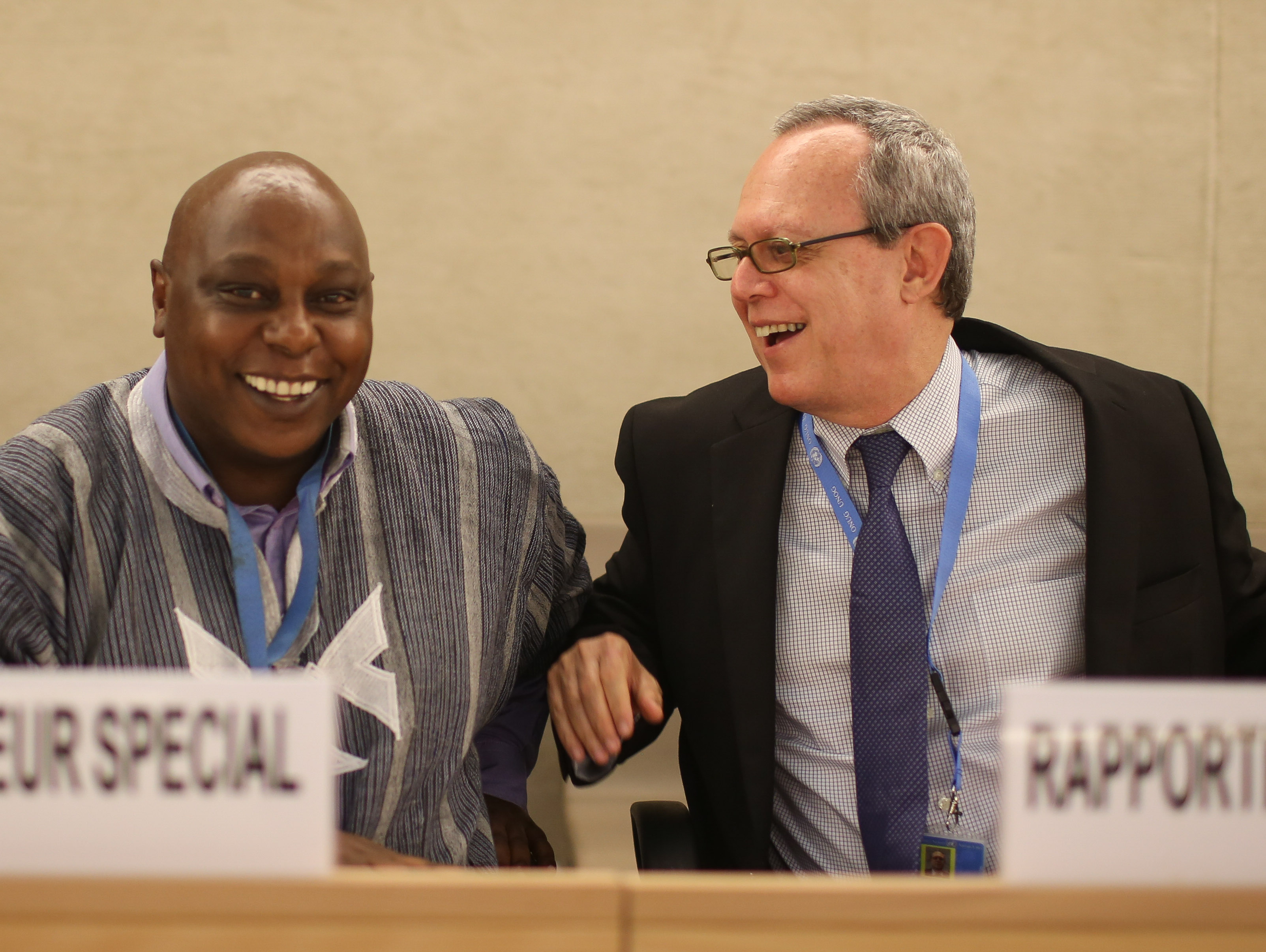
Frank William La Rue and Maina Kiai at the 26th Session of the Human Rights Council, June 2014

La Rue was appointed UN Special Rapporteur on Freedom of expression in August 2008 and served until August 2014. In that capacity, he monitored and exerted his influence on notable civil liberties controversies of the day, including supporting proposed corporate limits on the number of media licenses in Argentina against the opposition of the country's largest media groups, and by indicating in May 2011 that unrestricted and undisturbed access to the Internet is a fundamental human right. He also drew on his personal experience to propose the enactment that November of an international Treaty for the Blind.

La Rue later published a report on how state surveillance undermines freedom of expression and illegal monitoring of communication undermines human rights; this report was filed to OHCHR two days before Edward Snowden publicized NSA's warrantless surveillance program in June 2013. Several computers and documents belonging to the Special Rapporteur were stolen from his office located at the DEMOS Institute in Guatemala City on July 31 in as-yet unclear circumstances.

In 2014, the Electronic Frontier Foundation gave La Rue a Pioneer Award in recognition of his work in support of free expression around the world. Following his term as Special Rapporteur, La Rue was appointed a member of the International Board of Trustees of ARTICLE 19, the Global Campaign for Free Expression in 2015.

La Rue has lectured extensively in his fields of expertise, including teaching a seminar on freedom of expression at the American University Washington College of Law's Academy on Human Rights and Humanitarian Law as a visiting scholar in the summer of 2012.

La Rue also served as Assistant Director-General of UNESCO, working on freedom of expression and, in particular, press freedom issues.
