= Atonsu =

Atonsu may refer:

- Atonsu (Ashanti Region), Ghana
- Atonsu (Central Region), Ghana

== See also ==
- Atonu
