= Abraham Kwaku Fokuo =

Ghanaian politician

Abraham Kwaku Fokuo is a Ghanaian politician and member of the first parliament of the fourth republic of Ghana representing Assin North constituency under the membership of the National Democratic Congress (NDC).

== Early life and education ==
Abraham was born on 8 August 1948. He attended University of Cape Coast and Howard University where he obtained his Bachelor of Arts and Master of Arts respectively. He worked as a teacher before going into parliament.

== Politics ==
He began his political career in 1992 when he became the parliamentary candidate for the National Democratic Congress (NDC) to represent his constituency in the Central Region of Ghana prior to the commencement of the 1992 Ghanaian parliamentary election.

He was sworn into the First Parliament of the Fourth Republic of Ghana on 7 January 1993 after being pronounced winner at the 1992 Ghanaian election held on 29 December 1992.

After serving his four years tenure in office, Abraham lost his candidacy to his fellow party comrade Florence Kumi. She defeated Kwabena Karikari- Apau of the National Patriotic Party (NPP) who polled 13,242 votes which was equivalent to 26.70% of the total valid votes cast, Francis Kweku Edzii of the National Convention Party (NCP) who polled 874 votes which was equivalent to 1.80% of the total valid votes cast and Joseph Yeboah of the Convention People's Party (CPP) who polled 0 vote which was equivalent to 0.00% of the total valid votes cast. Florence polled 24,080 votes which was equivalent to 48.60% of the total valid votes cast. She was thereafter elected on 7 January 1997.
