= Assin Homaho =

Assin Homaho is a well known as a farming community and tourism which is situated in the Assin South District of the Central Region of Ghana.

== History ==
The village of Assin Homaho was built by Nana Duodu I, also known as Akora Duodu, who saw a huge rope (Ahoma) wound around a tall tree in a dense forest.
