= Abena Durowaa Mensah =

Ghanaian politician (born 1977)

Hon. Abena Durowaa Mensah MP

Member of the Ghana Parliament for Assin North Constituency
- In office 7 January 2017 – 6 January 2021
- Succeeded by: James Gyakye Quayson
- President: Nana Akuffo-Addo

Personal details
- Born: Abena Durowaa Mensah; 27 June 1977 (age 49) Assin Kushea, Ghana
- Party: New Patriotic Party
- Children: 2
- Education: Ghana Insurance College, CIM - UK, Christian Service University College
- Occupation: Politician
- Profession: Manager

Abena Durowaa Mensah (born 21 June 1977) is a Ghanaian politician and a member of the New Patriotic Party. She was the member of parliament for Assin North Constituency.

== Early life and education ==
Abena Durowaa Mensah was born on 21 June 1977 in Assin Kushea in the Central Region of Ghana. She holds a Diploma in Insurance from Ghana Insurance College, a professional Certificate in Marketing (CIM - UK ), and a bachelor's degree in marketing from Christian Service University College.

== Career ==
Abena Durowaa Mensah was the Manager for Esich Life Assurance in Sunyani.

== Politics ==
Abena Durowaa Mensah is a member of the New Patriotic Party. She was the Member of Parliament for Assin North Constituency from 2017 to 2021.

=== 2016 elections ===
In the 2016 Ghanaian general elections, she won the Assin North Constituency parliamentary seat with 15,553 votes making 56.8% of the total votes cast whilst the NDC parliamentary candidate Samuel Ambre had 10,751 votes making 39.2% of the total votes cast, the PPP parliamentary candidate Isaac Manu had 979 votes making 3.6% of the total votes cast and the CPP parliamentary candidate Sanni Mahama had 115 votes making 0.4% of the total votes cast.

=== 2020 elections ===
In the 2020 Ghanaian general election, she lost the Assin North Constituency seat to the NDC parliamentary candidate James Gyakye Quayson. She had 14,193 votes making 44.79% of the total votes cast.

== Personal life ==
Abena Durowaa Mensah is married with two children. She identifies as a Christian.
