= Kwaku Al-Hassan Dadzie =

Ghanaian politician

Kwaku Al Hassan Dadzie

Member of parliament for Assin South Constituency
- In office 7 January 1997 – 6 January 2001
- President: John Jerry Rawlings

Personal details
- Born: Assin South, Central Region Ghana
- Party: National Democratic Congress
- Occupation: Politician

Kwaku Al-Hassan Dadzie is a Ghanaian politician and a member of the Second Parliament of the Fourth Republic representing the Assin South Constituency in the Central Region of Ghana from 1996 to 2000.

== Early life ==
Dadzie was born in Assin South in the Central Region of Ghana.

== Politics ==
Dadzie was first elected into Parliament on the ticket of the National Democratic Congress for the Assin South Constituency during the December 1996 Ghanaian general elections in the Central Region of Ghana. He polled 14,945 votes out of the 28,292 valid votes cast representing 43.10% over a New Patriotic Party member who polled 12,488 votes representing 36.00%, Emmanuel Koomson of the Convention People's Party who polled 629 votes representing 1.80% and Michael Damtse who polled 230 votes representing 0.70%. He was defeated by Dominic K. Fobih of the New Patriotic Party who polled 16,140 votes out of the 26,764 valid votes cast representing 60.30%
