= Global Network Initiative =

American NGO

- Abbreviation: GNI
- Formation: 2008; 18 years ago
- Type: 501(c)(3) organization
- Tax ID no.: 27-2322782
- Headquarters: Washington, D.C., United States
- Key people: David Kaye; Mark Stephens; Agustina Del Campo; Jason Pielemeier; Elonnai Hickok
- Website: globalnetworkinitiative.org

The Global Network Initiative (GNI) is a non-governmental organization with the dual goals of preventing Internet censorship by authoritarian governments and protecting the Internet privacy rights of individuals. It is sponsored by a coalition of multinational corporations, global non-profit organizations, and academic institutions. David Kaye is the independent chair of the board. Mark Stephens was the previous independent chair.

== History ==
On October 29, 2008, the Global Network Initiative (GNI) was founded upon its "Principles of Freedom of Expression and Privacy". The Initiative was launched in the 60th anniversary year of the Universal Declaration of Human Rights (UDHR), and is based on internationally recognized laws and standards for human rights on freedom of expression and privacy set out in the UDHR, the International Covenant on Civil and Political Rights (ICCPR) and the International Covenant on Economic, Social and Cultural Rights (ICESCR).

== Profile ==
As a human rights organization, GNI seeks to safeguard freedom of expression and personal privacy against government restrictions. The protections are facilitated by a coalition of companies, investors, civil society organizations, academics, and other stakeholders.

GNI esteems freedom of expression and privacy each as a "human right and guarantor of human dignity". Participants are expected to respect and protect information available to users and users' ability to freely create and distribute information, provided that they operate outside narrowly defined circumstances necessary to adhere to international laws and standards set by the International Covenant on Civil and Political Rights (ICCPR).

Participants are also expected to protect users' personal information from illegal or arbitrary interference when confronted with government demands, laws, or regulations that compromise a user's privacy. The same principle of adherence of international laws and standards applies.

Collaboration among stakeholders is key to the goals of the Global Network Initiative. The GNI's outline of principles encourages participants to explore ways to engage governments to advance their cause, individually or collectively.

GNI recognizes that the actions of their corporate participants alone cannot guarantee the protection of human rights. One fundamental commitment is to promote the adoption of laws, policies, and practices that protect freedom of expression and privacy. GNI considers governments to be ultimately responsible for the fulfillment of their citizens' human rights, specifically pursuant to freedom of expression and privacy.

== Participants and Board of Directors ==
The Global Network Initiative requires participating companies to integrate their principles deeply into their decision-making and culture. GNI's founding companies include Google, Yahoo (now Oath Inc.), and Microsoft. Facebook joined GNI in 2013. In 2017, seven telecommunications operator and vendor companies joined GNI.

The Board consists of:

ICT Companies:

- Meta
- Google
- Microsoft
- Nokia
- Orange
- Telenor Group
- Telia Company
- Verizon
- Yahoo
- Zoom
- Wikimedia

Civil Society Organizations:

- Center for Democracy & Technology
- Freedom House
- CIPESA
- Global Partners Digital
- Internews
- Software Freedom Law Center India
- Human Rights Watch
- Centre for Internet and Society (India)

Academics and Academic Organizations:

- Berkman Klein Center for Internet & Society at Harvard University
- Centre for Communication Governance National Law University, Delhi

Investors:

- BNP Paribas
- EIRIS
- Boston Common Asset

GNI is funded by member contributions and through additional support from other sources, including private foundations and governments. GNI is currently implementing projects supported by:

- United States Department of State's Bureau of Democracy, Human Rights, and Labor;
- Ministry of Foreign Affairs (Netherlands)
- Ford Foundation
