= Assin South District =

- District
- Districts of Central Region

- Location of Assin South District within Central
- Coordinates: 5°27′28.8″N 1°9′28.8″W
- Country: Ghana
- Region: Central
- Capital: Nsuaem Kyekyewere

Government
  - District Executive: Hon.Felicia Amissah - Ntrakwah

Population (2021)
  - Total: 105,995
- Time zone: UTC+0 (GMT)
- ISO 3166 code: GH-CP-

Assin South District is one of the twenty-two districts in Central Region, Ghana. Originally it was formerly part of the then-larger Assin District in 1988, until the southern part of the district was split off to create Assin South District on 18 February 2004; thus the remaining part has been renamed as the first Assin North District, with Assin Fosu as its capital town (which it was later elevated to municipal district assembly status on 29 February 2008 to become Assin North Municipal District, and later the northern part of the district was split off to create the present Assin North District on 15 March 2018). The district assembly is located in the northwest part of Central Region and has Nsuaem Kyekyewere as its capital town.

== Populated places ==
Other popular towns in the district include: Assin Manso, Darmang, Fante Nyankumasi and Assin Jakai. The current population of the district using a 2.9% growth rate stands at 105,995 made up of 52,083 males and 53,912 females.

== List of settlements ==
Settlements of Assin South District
No.	Settlement	Population	Population year
1	Assin Adiembra		
2	Assin Achiase		
3	Assin Anyinabrim		
4	Assin Asamankese		
5	Assin Darmang		
6	Assin Ongwa (Aworoso)		
7	Assin Jakai		
8	Assin Ngresi		
9	Assin Atobiase		
10	Ongua		
11	Nsuaem Kyekyewere		
12	Assin Odumase		
13	Nsuta		

== Sources ==
- "Assin South District". Statoids.
