= Kennedy Agyapong =

Ghanaian politician and businessman

Hon. Kennedy Ohene Agyapong
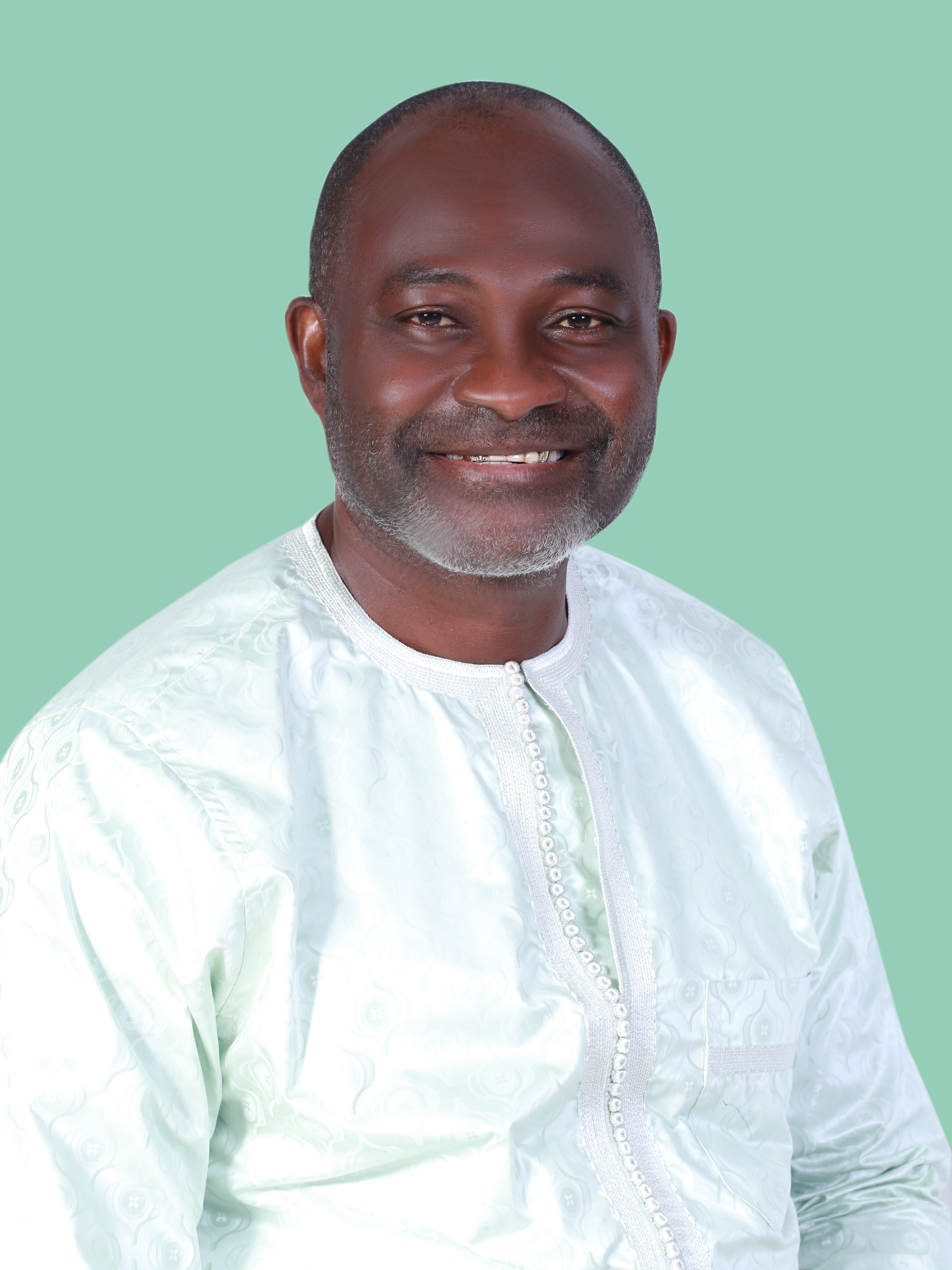
- Agyapong in 2021

Member of Parliament for Assin Central
- In office 7 January 2013 – 6 January 2025
- President: Nana Akufo-Addo
- Preceded by: New Constituency
- Succeeded by: Nurein Shiabu Migyimah

Member of Parliament for Assin North
- In office 1 January 2001 – 6 January 2013
- Preceded by: Florence Kumi
- Succeeded by: Samuel Ambre

Personal details
- Born: Kennedy Ohene Agyapong; 16 June 1960 (age 66) Assin Dompim, Central Region, Ghana
- Party: New Patriotic Party
- Education: Fordham University
- Occupation: Politician
- Profession: Businessperson
- Committees: Defense and Interior Committee (Chairperson); Judiciary Committee; Special Budget Committee

Kennedy Ohene Agyapong (born 16 June 1960) is a Ghanaian politician and businessman who represented Assin Central in parliament as a member of the New Patriotic Party. He was first elected as a member of parliament in 2000 to the seat of Assin North. He retained his seat in the year 2004 and 2008 parliamentary elections. In 2012, he was elected in the new seat of Assin Central and was re-elected in 2016. He also retained his seat in the 2020 general elections. He was the Chairman of the Parliament's Defense and Interior Committee under the Akuffo-Addo led administration. He is known for his fiery oratory skills and persona.

== Early life and education ==
Kennedy Ohene Agyapong was born on 16 June 1960 to Francis Ohene Kofi Agyapong and Mary Nsiah at Assin Dompim in the Central Region of Ghana. He had his secondary education at Adisadel College in the Central Region. Agyapong holds a GCE A-Level and studied at the Fordham University, New York, USA. He is a farmer and businessman, director of Assin Farms, Supercare Group of Companies and Hollywood Shopping Centre.

== Politics ==
Kennedy Agyapong is one of the politicians who have never lost any parliamentary election he contested. He was first elected as MP in the year 2000. Kennedy Agyapong was once a chairman of the Communication Committee of Parliament.

Agyapong vowed to commit suicide if former President John Mahama's brother, Ibrahim Mahama, is not jailed by the Akufo-Addo government for some alleged corrupt activities which, according to Agyapong, had led to the state losing money. One of his claims was that Ibrahim defaulted in his taxes for over year when his brother was President of the Republic of Ghana. The allegation was investigated and Ibrahim eventually paid the taxes with accompanying fines. This action earned Agyapong praises from Ghanaians.

Prior to Election 2016, Agyapong constantly attacked Chairperson of the Electoral Commission, Charlotte Osei.He alleged in one of his attacks that the EC Boss had traded sex for her position. Agyapong was widely condemned.

In 2018, undercover Journalist, Anas Aremeyaw Anas, released Number 12, an investigative documentary about corruption in Ghana football and it resulted in the arrest and subsequent resignation of Ghana Football Association president, Kwesi Nyantakyi. Agyapong labelled the investigative journalist a rogue, and appealed that he be stopped before he began intruding people's privacy, including in their bedrooms.

He launched a counter campaign against Anas, publicly broadcasting a documentary; Who watches the watchman, in which he allegedly shows the “unfair” investigation methods and corrupt sides of the investigator and his team, and Reporters Without Borders. In June 2018, he broadcast images of Ahmed Hussein-Suale, an undercover agent and protégé of Anas on his Net2 TV and called for retribution against the journalist. Weeks later, Hussein-Suale was murdered at his Madina neighbourhood in the country's capital. In July 2018, after describing Parliament of Ghana as useless, Agyapong was hauled before the Privileges Committee for contempt of Parliament. Before the committee, he denied labelling the legislature as useless, insisting that he was misquoted. Agyapong eventually apologised and the matter was settled. In 2025, an American court awarded $18 million in damages against Agyapong in a case brought against him by Anas. The court later slashed the damage to $500

=== Committees. ===
In the eighth Parliament, Agyapong is the chairperson for the Defense and Interior Committee. He is also a member of the Judiciary Committee and also, the Special Budget Committee.

== Presidential Bid ==
In 2022, Kennedy Ohene Agyapong announced he will not seek re-election to Parliament for a seventh term. Later in May 2022, he announced his intention to contest the presidential primaries of his party, the New Patriotic Party. In his quest to represent his party as its flagbearer for the 2024 elections, Agyapong spelt out his plans for the country. He stated that if he won the party primaries and general election, he would utilize his initial 100 days as president to transform the mindset of Ghanaians. Agyapong, who was asked if he stood a chance considering he was in the contest with people who had PHDs and were better educated than him, shot down the relevance of education certificates: redefining PHD as Patriotism, Honesty and Discipline, principles he indicated were valuable and can lead to significant changes in Ghana.

He also touted the tourism potential of Ghana and said his presidency was going to develop tourism facilities and sites to make the country a go-to destination for tourists. On the creation of jobs for the youth, Agyapong described the youth unemployment rate as alarming but indicated per his trackrecord of providing jobs to 7,000 people via his business, he was “Ghana's saviour“.

In November 2023, Agyapong stood in the presidential primaries of the New Patriotic Party. He received 37.4% of the votes cast by delegates bringing him second to Mahamudu Bawumia who was selected to lead the party into the general election in December 2024. Agyapong joined Bawumia on a campaign tour of the Ashanti region.

== Personal life ==
He is a Christian and married with 22 children.
