= Dominic Fobih =

Ghanaian politician (born 1942)

Member of Parliament for Assin South Constituency
- In office 7 January 2001 – 6 January 2017
- Succeeded by: John Ntim Fordjuor

Personal details
- Born: 16 July 1942 (age 84)
- Party: New Patriotic Party
- Education: University of Alberta
- Profession: Politician

Dominic Fobih (born 16 July 1942) is a Ghanaian politician, professor and an Educationist/Teacher. He was the member of parliament for Assin South in the Central region of Ghana from January 2001 to January 2017 on the ticket of the New Patriotic Party. He was also a cabinet Minister of Lands, Forestry and Mines during Ex-President John Agyekum Kufour regime.

== Early life and education ==
Dominic was born on 16 July 1942. He comes from a town called Assin Jakai in the Central region of Ghana. He obtained his PhD in Educational psychology at the University of Alberta in Canada in the year 1979.

      He lectured at Ilorin University, Kwara State in Nigeria.

He obtained his professorship at Atlanta, Georgia. He is an educationist.

== Career ==
Fobih is a member of the New Patriotic Party. He served as a member of Parliament for the two terms during the regime of the Ex-President John Agyekum Kuffour from January 2001 to January 2009. During the 2000 Ghanaian parliamentary elections he polled 16,963 votes out of the 31,843 making a total valid votes cast of 53.3%. He was also the Minister of Lands, Forestry and Mines from 2003 to 2007, under John Agyekum Kuffour's regime. He retained his seat as the member of parliament for the Assin South Constituency when John Atta Mills won the 2008 Ghanaian general elections from January 2009 to January 2012. He again retained his seats as a member of parliament for the Assin South during the 2012 Ghanaian general election under the ticket of the New Patriotic Party in the regime of John Dramini Mahama. He served as a member of the Education and House committees when his party NPP came to opposition in 2012 and was the minority spokesperson on education.

Dominic was also a lecturer at the University of Cape Coast in the Central Region of Ghana.

He is the current board chairman of Ghana Education Trust fund (GETFUND).

== Politics ==
Fobih was elected as a member of parliament during the 2004 Ghanaian general elections of the fourth parliament of the fourth republic of Ghana in the Assin South Constituency. He retained his seats as a member of parliament for the fifth and sixth parliament of the fourth republic of Ghana in the 2008 and 2012 Ghanaian general elections respectively.

== Personal life ==
Dominic is married with nine children. He is a Christian by religion and he is a member of the Catholic church of Ghana.
