= Nigerian Army Day =

- Observed by: Nigeria; Nigerian Army
- Type: Secular/Military
- Date: 6 July
- First time: 1978; 48 years ago
- Started by: Federal Government of Nigeria
- Related to: Armed Forces Remembrance Day

The Nigerian Army Day is a holiday and annual event typically held on 6 July in honor of members of the Nigerian Army, especially those that took part in the World War I and World War II as well as those that lost their lives during the Nigerian Civil War and the current serving members of the Nigerian Army.

== History ==
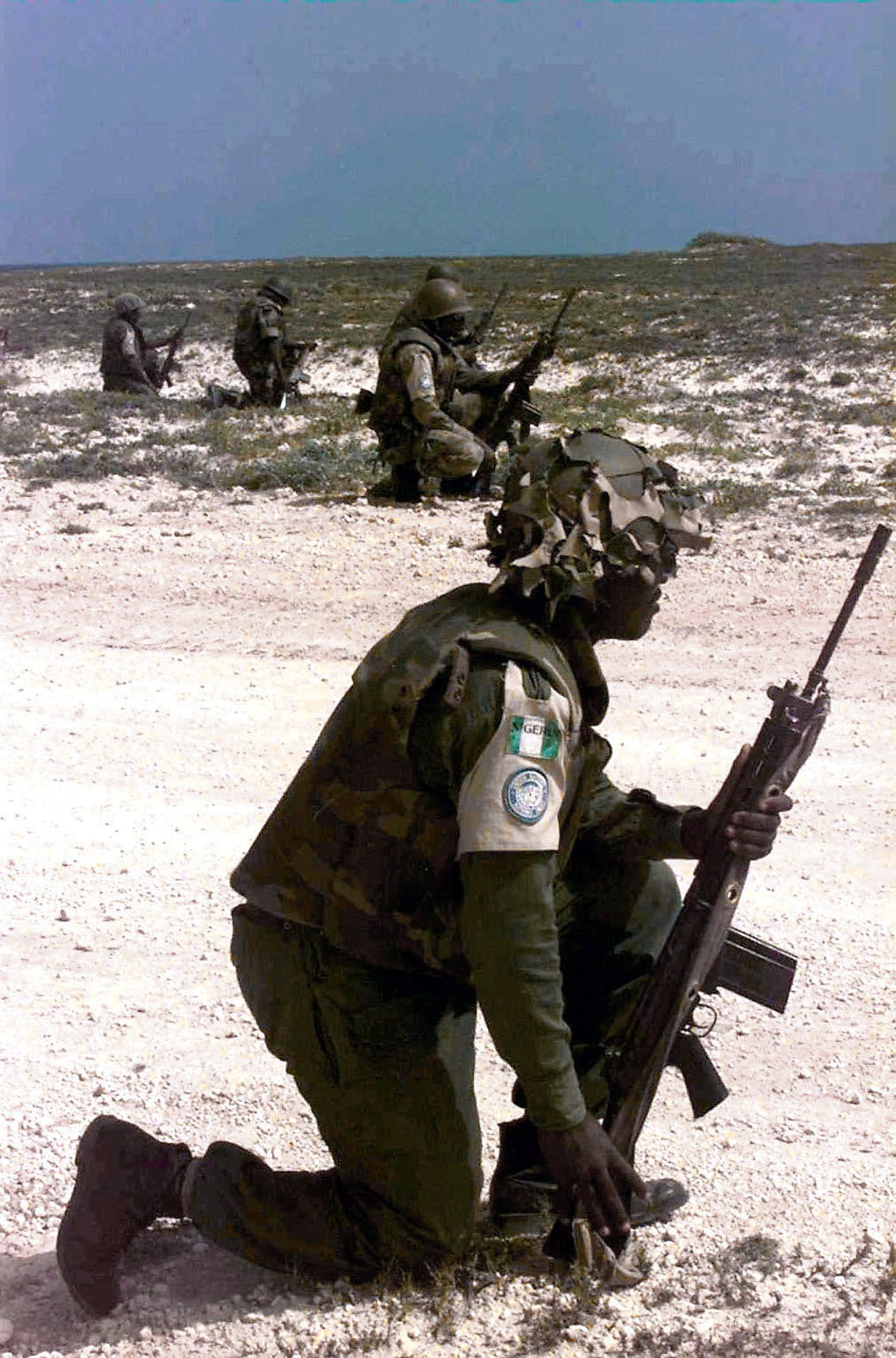
Nigerian soldiers in Somalia, 1993

The history of the Nigerian Army Day is traced back to 1863 when the "Glover Hausas" was formed by the late British War veteran, John Hawley Glover who organized and assemble the freed Hausa slaves to protect the Royal Niger Company from marauding incursions of the Ashantis. The assemblage of this youth to repel the invasion of intruders marked the formation of the Nigerian Army. On 6 July was adopted to mark Nigerian Army Day because it was believed that the Glover Hausas, that metamorphosed to the Nigerian Army, were formed on 6 July. The history of the day can also be traced back to 6 July 1967, the day the Nigerian Civil War began. The first celebration took place in 1978.

== Army Day by year ==
=== 2013 ===
In 2013, during the celebration in Ogun State, southwestern Nigeria, Chief Olusegun Obasanjo, the former President of Nigeria declined the Ogun State Governor, Ibikunle Amosun's request to lay a wreath at the event centre in Abeokuta on the basis of the fact that he was not listed as one of the people to perform the wreath-laying for the fallen heroes.

=== 2015 ===
The 2015 celebration was held at Maiduguri, the birthplace of Boko Haram to boost the morale of the Nigerian Soldiers, combating the insurgency and 128 imprisoned members of Boko Haram were released as part of the celebrations.
