= Abid Hussain =

Indian economist, civil servant and diplomat (1926–2012)

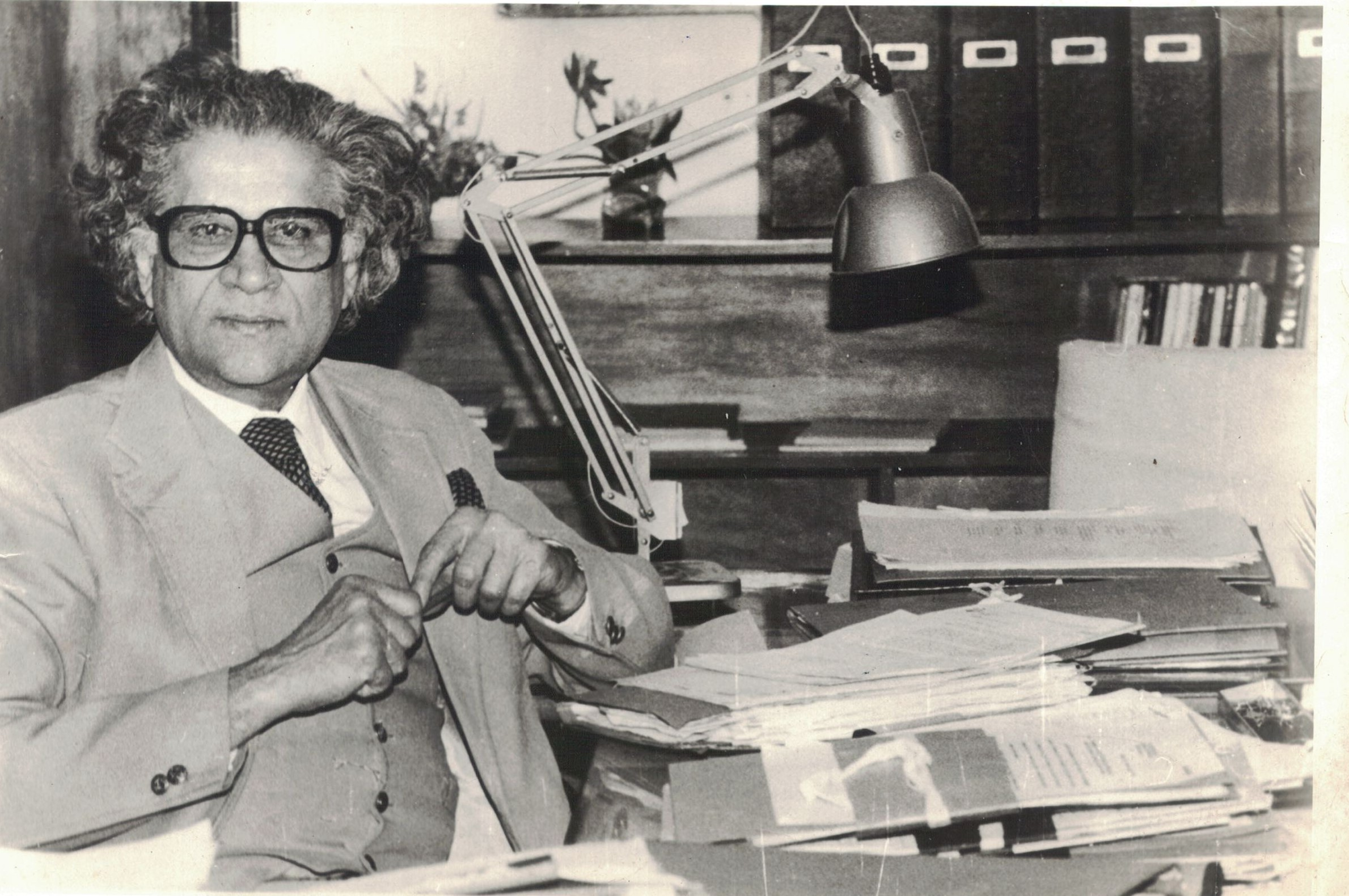
- Hussain in the mid-1980s

UN Special Rapporteur on Freedom of Expression
- Succeeded by: Ambeyi Ligabo

Personal details
- Born: 26 December 1926 Hyderabad, Hyderabad state, India
- Died: 21 June 2012 (aged 85) London, England
- Spouse: Trilok Karki Hussain
- Occupation: Economist, civil servant, and diplomat
- Awards: Padma Bhushan (1988)

Abid Hussain (26 December 1926 – 21 June 2012) was an Indian economist, civil servant and diplomat. He was India's ambassador to the United States of America from 1990 to 1992 and a member of the Planning Commission from 1985 to 1990.

== Personal life ==
Hussain was married to Trilok Karki, author of "Sino-Indian Conflict and International Politics in the Indian Sub-Continent", (1977) and had three children: Suhail Hasan, Vishaka Hussain, and Rana Hasan. His brother is the actor and mime artist Irshad Panjatan, who played in the German film Der Schuh des Manitu. Dr. Hussain grew up in his hometown Hyderabad, in Hyderabad State, where he studied at the Nizam College in 1942. He then joined the Hyderabad Administrative Service, and was deputed for training at the Indian Administrative Service (IAS) training school on 2 January 1950.

== Career ==
Hussain served as India's ambassador to the United States of America from 1990 to 1992. He also served as secretary in the Ministry of Commerce and Ministry of Heavy Industry as a member of the IAS. He was a Member of India's Planning Commission from 1985 to 1990. Hussain was honoured in 1988 with the Padma Bhushan (awarded to recognise distinguished service of a high order to the nation) and has been at the forefront of India's economic and trade reforms since the 1980s. He chaired six important committees set up by the Government of India covering Trade Policy Reforms; Project Exports; CSIR Review Committee for Development of Science and Technology; Textile Policy of the Government of India; Development of Capital Market; and Small Scale Industry. Of these, the Abid Hussain Committee Report on Trade Policy Reform and the Abid Hussain Committee Report on Small Scale Industries have been regarded as milestones in India's economic reforms.

He was also president of Katha, chairman of Research Council of National Institute of Science, Technology & Development Studies (CSIR); India-China Economic & Cultural Council; Bhartiya Vidya Bhavan, NOIDA Kendra, member of the board of trustees of the Observer Research Foundation, member of the board of governors of Himgiri Zee University, Dehra Dun and several other cultural organisations. He was a member of the Nehru Memorial Fund; the Asia Society, New York; Population Foundation of India; Foundation for Academic Excellence & Access; Administrative Staff College of India, Hyderabad; Shankar Lall Murli Dhar Memorial Society; and the Governing Council of Ranbaxy Science Foundation.

In addition, he was president of Lovraj Memorial Trust and a member of Academy of the Kingdom of Morocco and BP Koirala Foundation (Nepal).

From 1993 to 2002, Hussain was United Nations Special Rapporteur on the promotion and protection of the right to freedom of opinion and expression. He was a member of the Constitution Review Commission set up by Government of India. He was a member of the Prasar Bharati Board till April 2001 and a member of the Council on Foreign Relations, New York.

During his long career he was UN adviser on Turkey on community development for two years and also chief of industrial, technology, human settlements and environment in the UN Regional Commission of ESCAP, Bangkok for seven years. He was vice-chairman of Rajiv Gandhi Foundation, chancellor of Central University, Hyderabad, and trustee of the Indira Gandhi National Centre for the Arts Trust. Hussain presided over several national and international conferences and contributed papers on contemporary issues.

He was an active member of civil society and contributed to contemporary debates on a wide range of issues including globalisation, Internet censorship, gender issues, freedom of expression, and cultural relativism.

== Death ==
On 21 June 2012, Abid Hussain died in London due to a massive heart attack.

At the time of his death, Hussain was chancellor of English and Foreign Languages University, Hyderabad; chancellor of ICFAI Foundation for Higher Education, member on the board of trustees, of India Development Foundation of Overseas Indians (Ministry of External Affairs), member of International Panel on Democracy & Development of UNESCO; professor emeritus at Indian Institute of Foreign Trade; professor emeritus at the Foreign Service Institute of Ministry of External Affairs; chairman of Ghalib Academy and vice-president of Rumi Foundation.

== Awards ==
Hussain was honoured with the Padma Bhushan in 1988 for meritorious services.

== See also ==
- Syed Akbaruddin

== References and notes ==
Political offices
Preceded by Karan Singh	Indian Ambassador to the United States; 1990–1992	Succeeded by Siddhartha Shankar Ray
