= United Nations Special Rapporteur on the promotion and protection of the right to freedom of opinion and expression =

United Nations Special Rapporteur

- Emblem of the United Nations
- Incumbent; Leopoldo Maldonado Gutiérrez since August 2026
- Inaugural holder: Abid Hussain
- Website: Official website

The United Nations special rapporteur on the promotion and protection of the right to freedom of opinion and expression was created on 5 March 1993 by the Human Rights Council to protect and promote freedom of opinion and expression, offline and online, in light of international human rights law and standards. The mandate is limited to three years and is regularly extended.

== Mandate ==
The special rapporteur is mandated to

- transmit urgent appeals and letters of allegation to Member States on alleged violations of the right to freedom of opinion and expression;
- gather all relevant information relating to violations of the right to freedom of opinion and expression;
- provide suggestions on ways and means to better promote and protect the right to freedom of opinion;
- submit annual reports covering his/her activities relating to the mandate
- undertake fact-finding country visits.

== List of post-holders ==
Officeholders
Portrait	Name	Mandate		Nationality
Portrait	Name	From	To	Nationality
	Leopoldo Maldonado Gutiérrez	2026	Incumbent	Mexico
	Irene Khan	2020	2026	Bangladesh
	David Kaye	2014	2020	United States
	Frank William La Rue	2008	2014	Guatemala
	Ambeyi Ligabo	2002	2008	Kenya
	Abid Hussain	1993	2002	India
