= Samuel Ambre =

Ghanaian politician

Member of the Ghana Parliament for Assin North Constituency
- In office 7 January 2013 – 6 January 2017

Personal details
- Born: 1 March 1972 (age 54)
- Party: National Democratic Congress
- Education: University of Education, Winneba

Samuel Ambre (born 1 March 1972) was a member of the Sixth Parliament of the Fourth Republic of Ghana representing the Assin North in the Central region of Ghana.

== Early life and education ==
Ambre was born on 1 March 1972 in Oppong Valley in the Western region of Ghana. He holds a bachelor's degree in education in Early Childhood Care and Development at University of Education, Winneba.

== Career ==
Ambre is an educationist. Prior to becoming a member of the Parliament of Ghana, he was a teacher at Twifo Praso Basic School in Twifo Praso.

== Politics ==
He is a member of the National Democratic Congress (NDC). In 2012, Ambre contested in the 2012 Ghanaian General Elections under the ticket of the NDC and won, giving him the chance to represent the Assin North constituency. He garnered 14,338 votes which represents 51.64% of the valid votes cast and hence defeated the other contestants including Ebenezer Appiah-Kubi, Akakpo John Gameley, Sanni Mahama and Daniel Gibson Gyetuan.

However, when he contested in the 2016 Ghanaian General elections, he lost to Abena Durowaa Mensah of the New Patriotic Party and hence could not get a second chance to represent his constituency.

== Personal life ==
He is married with three children. He is a Christian (Methodist).
