= Lydia Lariba Bawa =

Ghanaian Insurer and former Commissioner of Insurance

Commissioner of Insurance of Ghana
- In office June 2013 – July 2017
- Appointed by: John Dramani Mahama

Personal details
- Education: University of Ghana
- Occupation: Lawyer, Chartered Insurer

Lydia Lariba Bawa is a Ghanaian lawyer and the former Commissioner of Insurance of the Republic of Ghana. She is a native of Wiaga in the Builsa District of the Upper East Region of Ghana. She is a Christian and a member of the Roman Catholic Church. She is also an Associate of the Chartered Insurance Institute.

== Educational life ==
Bawa graduated from the University of Ghana in 1981 with a degree in English and History. After her National Service she was employed by State Insurance Company in September, 1982. In 1984 she obtained a diploma from the West African Insurance Institute in Liberia. Upon her return to Ghana, she continued to work with SIC and in 1991 gained admission to the Ghana School of Law. Bawa passed the Ghana Bar in 1995. In 2006, she obtained an EMBA in finance from the University of Ghana Business School. She became a Chartered Insurer in 1992.

== Professional life ==
Bawa has worked with SIC all her professional life. She was employed by the company in 1982 and has held several positions over the course of her career. The last position she held at the company was Chief Manager and Area Manager in charge of the Northern Sector of Ghana.

- Head of Motor Claims Department
- Tema Area Manager supervising the Tema, Ho, Koforidua, Akim Oda and Aflao offices
- Head of Customer Service
- Head of Sales
- Head of Marketing
- Head of Health Insurance

Since the year 2000, she has been a visiting lecturer at the West Africa Insurance Institute in Banjul, The Gambia, and at the Ghana Insurance College since its establishment in 2006.

== Boards ==
Bawa has been a member of several boards in Ghana, including as Legal Adviser to the National Catholic Laity Council and as Organising Secretary of the Catholic Lawyers Guild, Boards of the National Catholic Laity Council, the Federation of Women Lawyers (FIDA), the Metro Mass Transit Company Limited, and the Council for Technical Education and Training (COTVET).

== Commissioner of Insurance ==
On June 1, 2013, John Dramani Mahama, President of Ghana, appointed Bawa as Commissioner of Insurance of Ghana.
