= John Ntim Fordjour =

Ghanaian politician (born 1986)

Hon. John Ntim Fordjour MP
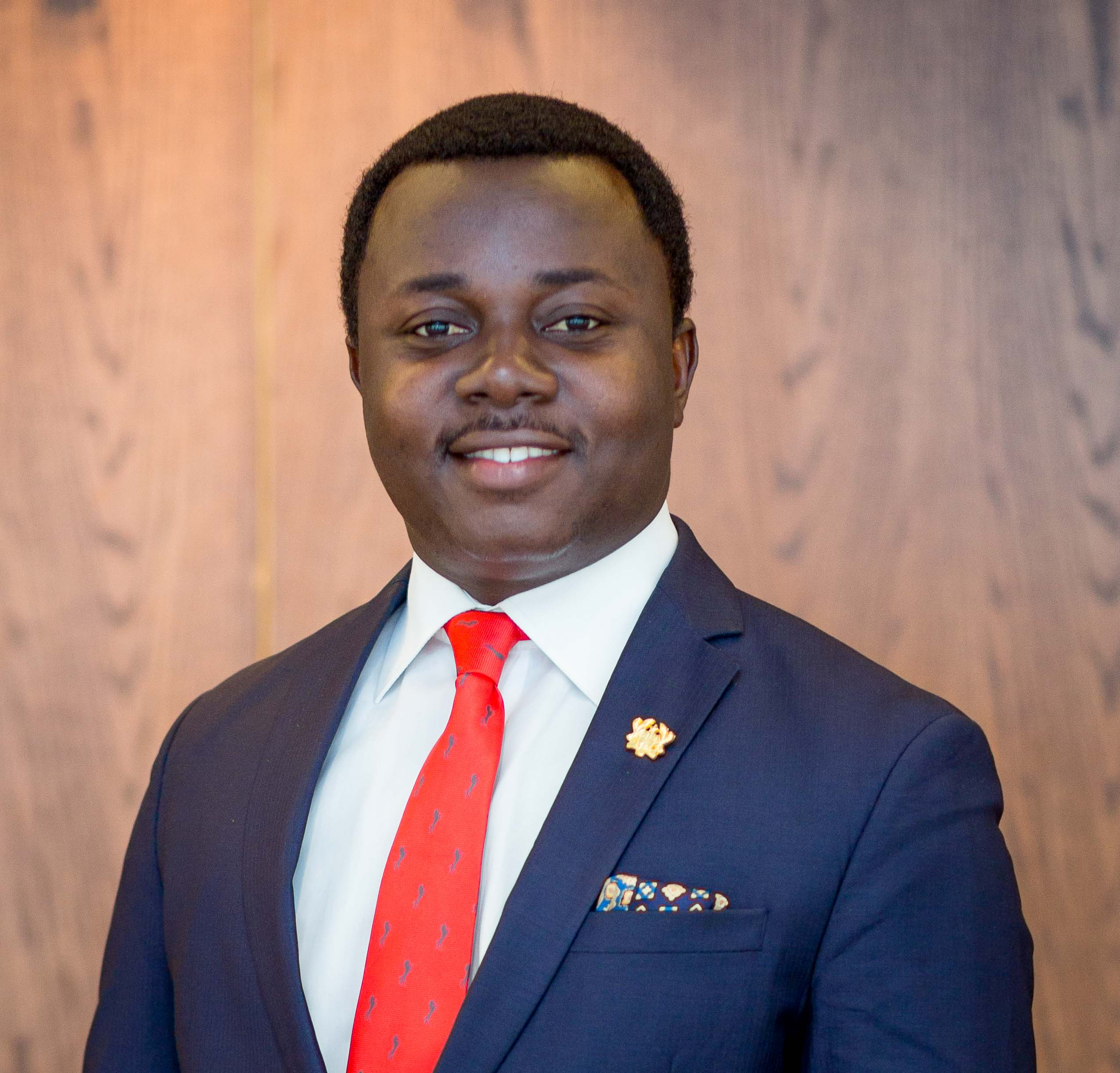

Member of the Ghana Parliament for Assin South Constituency
- Incumbent
- Assumed office January 2017
- Preceded by: Prof Dominic K Fobih
- Majority: New Patriotic Party

Personal details
- Born: May 28, 1986 (age 40) Assin Kruwa
- Party: New Patriotic Party
- Spouse: Tracy Ntim Fordjour
- Children: 4
- Education: University of Ghana, University of Mines and Technology (UMaT)
- Occupation: Politician (member of parliament), entrepreneur and Reverend minister).
- Profession: Mineral Engineer
- Website: www.johnfordjour.com

Reverend John Ntim Fordjour is a Ghanaian politician and member of the Seventh Parliament of the Fourth Republic of Ghana, representing the Assin South Constituency in the Central Region on the ticket of the New Patriotic Party. He served as the Deputy Minister of Education in H.E Nana Addo Dankwa Akufo-Addo's administration.

== Career ==
He is the Member of Parliament for Assin South Constituency of the Parliament of Ghana. He was also the Deputy Minister of Education. He is also the Chairman of the Ghana-Canada Parliamentary Friendship Association, Vice Chairman of the Parliamentary Committee on Members Holding Offices of Profit as well as a Member of Parliament Select Committee on Foreign Affairs. He is the Senior Pastor of Victory Bible Church International (VBCI) Higher Heights Sanctuary in East Legon.

== Early life and education ==
Fordjour was born on 28 May 1986 and hails from Assin Kruwa in the Central Region of Ghana. He attended Assin Manso Senior High School. He has a multi-disciplinary background in Mining, Economic Policy Management and International relations. Rev. Ntim Fordjour is currently a PhD Candidate in the Department of Political Science at the University of Ghana. He graduated with a bachelor's degree in Mineral Engineering from the University of Mines and Technology (UMaT), Tarkwa in 2007, and subsequently was awarded a Master of Arts Degree in Economic Policy Management by University of Ghana in 2014.

== Politics ==
Fordjour is a member of the New Patriotic Party.

In the 2016 elections, he obtained 23,308 votes out of the 39,887 valid votes cast, representing of 58.99% votes to become the member of parliament for Assin South Constituency.

He is currently the vice chairperson for the members Holding Offices of Profit Committee and also a member of the Foreign Affairs Committee in parliament. John Ntim Fordjour is a Member of the Governing Board of Ghana Integrated Iron & Steel Development Corporation (GIISDEC) and also serves as the Chair of the Investments and Strategy Committee of the Board.

In May 2026, Fordjour sponsored a bill criminalising homosexuality and the promotion of LGBTQ+ activities. As part of the bill, identifying as lesbian, gay, bisexual, transgender or queer can result in a sentence of three years in prison. The three year sentence also applies to those who engage in homosexual relations. Under the bill, a three to five year prison will apply for the promotion, sponsorship or intentional support of LGBTQ activities. Those who identify as an "ally" of LGBTQ+ people may also face a prison sentence. Fordjour said the bill protects Ghanaian family and cultural values. Human Rights Watch condemned the bill, calling on Ghana's government to, "uphold the international legal protections that guarantee every Ghanaian equality, non-discrimination, freedom of expression, and privacy."

== Personal life ==
Fordjour is married to Tracy Fordjour and has three children, all girls. He is a Christian and a Reverend.
