= Assin Praso =

- Urban area
- Country: Ghana
- Region: Central Region
- District: Assin North Municipal District
- Time zone: GMT
  - Summer (DST): GMT

Assin Praso is a town in the Assin North Municipal District of the Central Region in Ghana.

== Work/Jobs ==
=== Major work ===
- Farming

==== Cash crop ====
- Cocoa
