= Central General de Trabajadores de Guatemala =

CGTG
- Central General de Trabajadores de Guatemala
- Headquarters: Guatemala City
- Location: Guatemala
- Key people: José Pinzón, secretary general
- Affiliations: ITUC

The Central General de Trabajadores de Guatemala (CGTG) is a national trade union center in Guatemala. It is descended from the Central Nacional de Trabajadores, which operated clandestinely after the disappearance of 21 of its leaders arrested on June 21, 1980.

The CGTG is affiliated with the International Trade Union Confederation.
