= Alhaji Lamrana Bah =

Sierra Leonean businessman

Alhaji Lamrana Bah was a successful Sierra Leonean businessman from the Fula ethnic group and one of the country's richest people. He owned several local shops in Freetown and many other parts of Sierra Leone.

== Death ==
Alhaji Lamrana Bah, was shot and killed by armed men on board his Mercedes-Benz on February 16, 2008 in an apparent car-jacking along the Old Main Motor Road at Cola Tree, Allen Town in the East-End of Freetown. All shops and businesses owned by the Fula community in Freetown were closed for several days in protest of the Freetown Police failure to bring down crime in the city.
