= Florence Kumi =

Ghanaian politician

Member of parliament for Assin North Constituency
- In office 7 January 1997 – 6 January 2001
- President: John Jerry Rawlings

Personal details
- Born: Assin North, Central Region, Ghana
- Party: National Democratic Party
- Occupation: Politician

Florence Kumi is a Ghanaian politician and a member of the Second Parliament of the Fourth Republic representing the Assin North Constituency in the Central Region of Ghana.

== Early life ==
Kumi was born in Assin North in the Central Region of Ghana.

== Politics ==
Kumi was first elected into Parliament on the ticket of the National Democratic Congress for the Assin North Constituency in the Central Region of Ghana during the 1996 Ghanaian general elections. She polled 24,080 votes out of the 46,063 valid votes cast representing 48.60% over her opponents Kwabena Karikari- Apau of the New Patriotic Party who polled 13,242 votes representing 26.70%, Francis Kweku Edzii of the Nationalist Congress Party who polled 874 votes representing 1.80% and Joseph Yeboah of the Convention People's Party who polled 0 votes representing 0.00%. She lost in the 2000 Elections to Kennedy Ohene Agyepong of the New Patriotic Party who polled 20,066 votes representing 56.31% whilst she polled 14,071 votes.
