= Assin North (Ghana parliament constituency) =

Constituency in the Central Region of Ghana

- constituency for the Parliament of Ghana
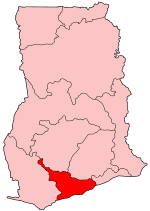
- District: Assin North District
- Region: Central Region of Ghana

Current constituency
- Party: National Democratic Congress
- MP: James Gyakye Quayson

Assin North is one of the constituencies represented in the Parliament of Ghana. It elects one Member of Parliament (MP) by the first past the post system of election. James Gyakye Quayson is the member of parliament for the constituency. The Assin North constituency is located in the Assin North district of the Central Region of Ghana.

== Boundaries ==
The seat is located entirely within the Assin North Municipality of the Central Region of Ghana.

== Members of Parliament ==
First elected	Member	Party
1992	Francis K. Edzii	National Convention Party
1996	Florence Kumi	National Democratic Congress
2000	Kennedy Agyapong	New Patriotic Party
2012	Samuel Ambre	National Democratic Congress
2016	Abena Durowaa Mensah	New Patriotic Party
2020	James Gyakye Quayson	National Democratic Congress

== Elections ==
2024 Ghanaian general election: Assin North:
Party	Candidate	Votes	%	±%
NDC	James Gyakye Quayson	18,023	57.0	−0.56
NPP	Charles Opoku	13,599	43.0	+0.85
Majority		4,424	14.0	−1.41
Turnout				
Registered electors				

The Supreme Court of Ghana ruled by 5-2 majority decision on 13 April 2022 that James Gyakye Quayson could not continue to sit in the house as MP for Assin North. He had appealed about a Cape Coast High Court ruling that nullified his election in 2020 and ordered a by-election following a petition. The by-election took place on 27 June 2023.

2023 by-election: Assin North:
Party	Candidate	Votes	%	±%
NDC	James Gyakye Quayson	17,245	57.56	
NPP	Charles Opoku	12,630	42.15	
Liberal Party of Ghana	Bernice Enyonam Sefenu	87	0.29	
Majority		4,615	15.41	
Turnout				
Registered electors				

2020 Ghanaian general election: Assin North:
Party	Candidate	Votes	%	±%
NDC	James Gyakye Quayson	17,498	55.21	+16.07
NPP	Abena Durowaa Mensah	14,193	44.79	−11.98
Majority		3,305	10.42	−7.11
Turnout				
Registered electors				

2016 Ghanaian general election: Assin North:
Party	Candidate	Votes	%	±%
NPP	Abena Durowaa Mensah	15,553	56.77	+12.53
NDC	Samuel Ambre	10,751	39.24	−12.40
PPP	Isaac Manu	979	3.57	+0.39
CPP	Sanni Mahama	115	0.42	−0.05
Majority		4,802	17.53	
Turnout				
Registered electors				

2012 Ghanaian general election: Assin North:
Party	Candidate	Votes	%	±%
NDC	Samuel Ambre	14,338	51.64	+18.74
NPP	Ebenezer Appiah-Kubi	12,281	44.24	−10.76
PPP	John Gameley Akakpo	884	3.18	
CPP	Sanni Mahama	131	0.47	−0.83
NDP	Daniel Gibson Gyetuan	129	0.46	
Majority		2,057	7.40	
Turnout				
Registered electors				

Ken Ohene Agyapong, the MP for the Assin North constituency from the 2000 parliamentary election to the 2008 parliamentary election became the MP for Assin Central constituency in 2012.

2008 Ghanaian general election: Assin North:
Party	Candidate	Votes	%	±%
NPP	Kennedy Ohene Agyapong	24,181	55.0	−3.6
NDC	Alex D. Antwi Boasiako	18,834	42.9	6.4
CPP	Roland Takyi	577	1.3	−3.5
DFP	John Dacosta Botchwey	336	0.8	—
Majority		5,347	7.1	−15.0
Turnout		—	—	—
Registered electors		—		

2004 Ghanaian general election: Assin North:
Party	Candidate	Votes	%	±%
NPP	Kennedy Ohene Agyapong	27,255	58.6	+2.01
NDC	Percy Kwasi Aboagye Mensah	16,966	36.5	−3.18
CPP	Kwabena Affum	2,258	4.8	+2.95
Majority		10,289	22.1	+5.19
Turnout		46,479	84.8	20.78
Registered electors		54,778		

2000 Ghanaian general election: Assin North:
Party	Candidate	Votes	%	±%
NPP	Kennedy Ohene Agyapong	20,066	56.59	+21.92
NDC	Florence Kumi	14,071	39.68	−23.36
CPP	Samuel Asare-Kyire	657	1.85	
National Reform Party	Theresa Acquah	352	0.99	
United Ghana Movement	Anthony Nkrumah	314	0.88	
Majority		5,995	16.91	−11.46
Turnout		35,460	64.02	
Registered electors		55,385		

1996 Ghanaian general election: Assin North:
Party	Candidate	Votes	%	±%
NDC	Florence Kumi	24,080	63.04	
NPP	Kwabena Karikari-Apau	13,242	34.67	
NCP	Francis Kweku Edzii	874	2.29	
People's Convention Party	Joseph Yeboah	0	0.00	
Majority		10,838	28.37	
Turnout		38,196		
Registered electors				

The 1992 Ghanaian parliamentary election was boycotted by the opposition parties. This led to a poor turnout of 28%.

1992 Ghanaian parliamentary election: Assin North:
Party	Candidate	Votes	%	±%
NDC	Francis K. Edzii	10,745		
Majority				
Turnout		11,758		
Registered electors		43,462		

== See also ==
- List of Ghana Parliament constituencies
- Assin North District
