= Glover Hausas =

Nigerian military group

The Glover Hausas or Glover's Hausas or Glover's Forty Thieves was a local military group, primarily consisting of freed Hausa slaves assembled by John Hawley Glover in 1863 to protect the Royal Niger Company from marauding incursions of the Ashantis. The local group later metamorphosed to the Nigerian Army of the Federal Republic of Nigeria.

== See also ==
- Nigerian Army Day
