= James Gyakye Quayson =

Ghanaian politician

Hon. James Gyakye Quayson
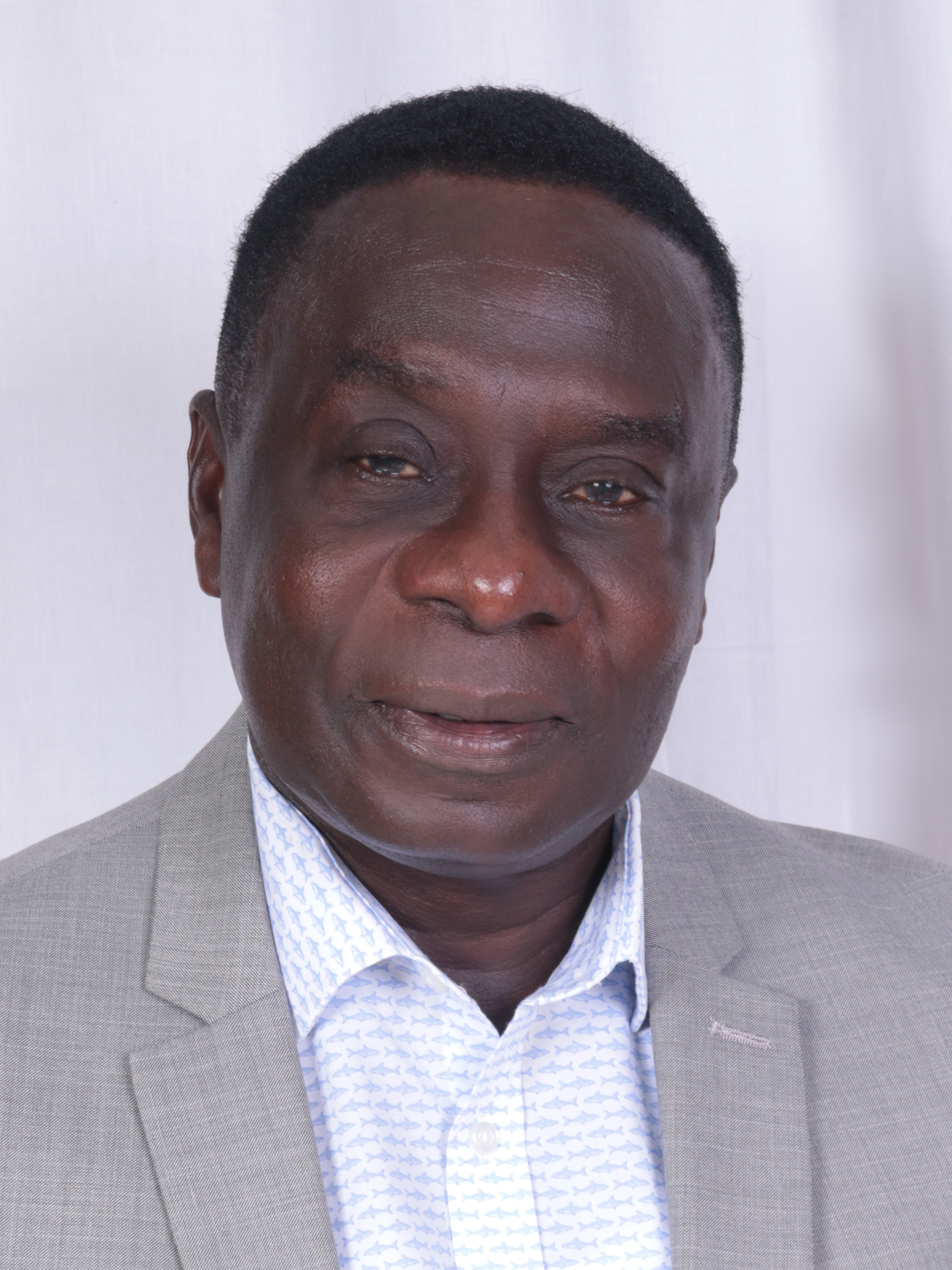

Member of the Ghana Parliament for Assin North
- Incumbent
- Assumed office 27 June 2023
- Preceded by: Self

Member of the Ghana Parliament for Assin North
- In office 7 January 2021 – 13 April 2022
- Preceded by: Abena Durowaa Mensah
- Succeeded by: Self

Personal details
- Born: 9 October 1952 (age 73)
- Party: National Democratic Congress
- Education: York University
- Occupation: Social Worker, Parliamentarian
- Committees: House; Local Government and Rural Development

James Gyakye Quayson (born 9 October 1952) is a Ghanaian politician who is currently serving as the member of Parliament (MP) for Assin North.

== Early life and education ==
James Gyakye Quayson hails from Assin Bereku in the Central Region of Ghana. He had his secondary education at Mfantsipim School in Cape Coast, completing in 1969. He moved to Toronto, Canada, where he graduated from York University with two bachelor's degrees, one in Social Sciences and another in General Arts with Majors in Political Science and Sociology. He also obtained a master's degree in Urban Planning and Community Development as well. He became a naturalized Canadian citizen before renouncing it in order to run for Member of Parliament for Assin North.

== Career ==
Prior to being in parliament, he worked as a District Manager for the City of Toronto Employment and Social services from 2020. He is also a Social Services and Community Development Administrator and manager, as well as a part-time framer.

== Election controversy ==
Quayson, who was a citizen of Canada, was found in violation of Article 92, Clause 2a of Ghana's constitution, when he ran for MP for Assin North during the 2020 parliamentary election, which states "a person shall not be qualified to be a member of parliament if he owes allegiance to a country other than Ghana". The Supreme Court of Ghana later declared the 2020 parliamentary election held in the Assin North constituency, null and void. He was re-elected after a by-election held on Tuesday, June 27, 2023 and sworn in on Tuesday, July 4, 2023.

=== Court proceedings ===
A Cape Coast High Court presided over by Justice Kwasi Boakye ordered fresh parliamentary elections to be conducted in the Assin North constituency after declaring the election null and void, Mr. Quayson went on to challenge the decision of the High Court at the Appeals Court in which his application was dismissed.

Michael Ankomah-Nimfah, the plaintiff/applicant who filed an election petition against Mr. Quayson has initiated another action at The Supreme Court of Ghana requesting that, the court allows the Cape Coast High Court judgement to take effect as well as prevent further breach of the 1992 Constitution of Ghana by restraining him as member of parliament (MP) since he continued to sit in parliament as MP and this was challenged within the house as well.

On 13 April 2022, The Supreme Court by a 5–2 majority decision ruled that he should stop holding himself as a member of parliament. He indicated his intention to contest the Supreme Court ruling by filing an application for The Supreme Court to review its own decision. The Supreme Court set 13 June 2022 for the trial against Quayson after postponing his application review for restraining him to hold himself as MP and preventing him to attend Parliament to conduct business on behalf of the people of Assin North constituency.

In a unanimous decision by The Supreme Court of Ghana consisting of Justices Jones Dotse, Nene Amegatcher, Mariama Owusu, Gertrude Torkonoo, Henrietta Mensah-Bonsu, Emmanuel Kulendi and Barbara Ackah Ayensu, presiding Judge Justice Jones Dotse on 17 May 2023 ruled that the Electoral Commission of Ghana acted unconstitutionally by accepting the nomination of Mr. Quayson without proof of citizenship renunciation before contesting the 2020 parliamentary elections. The Apex court outline four reasons for arriving at this decision in the case against Quayson which didn't sit well with the minority, National Democratic Congress (NDC) and the defendant, Mr. Quayson expressing his disappointment at the court's decision.

== Politics ==
Gyakye Quayson is a member of the National Democratic Congress (NDC) and was the member of parliament for Assin North Constituency in the Central Region of Ghana.

=== By-elections ===
In a letter to the Electoral Commission of Ghana (EC) on Monday, 29 May 2023, Parliament of Ghana declared the Assin North constituency seat vacant making way for a by-election. The EC announced 27 June 2023 as the date for the by-election in Assin North constituency in a press statement on Wednesday, 31 May 2023 and nominations will be received from 12 to 14 June 2023.

Mr. Quayson, in a statement on 1 June 2023, officially declared his intention to contest in the Assin North constituency by-election with support from his party, the National Democratic Congress. On 27 June 2023, Mr. Quayson won the Assin North constituency by-election with 17, 245 votes, constituting 57.56% of votes cast. This figure indicates a significant reduction of his votes obtained in the 2020 general election, which was 17,498 votes representing 55.21%.

James Gyakye Quayson, after emerging victorious in the by-election was sworn in for the second time as the Member of Parliament for Assin North on Tuesday, 27 June 2023.

=== 2024 election ===
He retained the seat in the ticket of the NDC to represent Assin North as MP by securing 18,023 votes, representing 56.35% of the total valid votes cast while his contender Charles Opoku secured 13,599 votes, representing 42.52% of the total valid votes cast.

=== Committees ===
Quayson was a member of the House Committee and also a member of the Local Government and Rural Development Committee.

== Personal life ==
He is a Christian.
