= Nana Agradaa =

Ghanaian religious leader

Patricia Asiedu Oduro Koranteng
- Born: Patricia Asiedu
- Other names: Nana Agradaa; Mama Pat; Evangelist Patricia Oduro Koranteng
- Occupations: Evangelist; former traditional priestess; media personality
- Known for: "Sika Gari" ritual; Heaven Way Church; Thunder TV and Ice1 TV
- Spouse: Pastor Eric Oduro-Koranteng

Patricia Asiedu Oduro Koranteng, also known as Nana Agradaa or Mama Pat, is a Ghanaian former traditional priestess who later became a Christian evangelist. She gained public attention for her involvement in a ritual called "Sika Gari", which she claimed could multiply money. The practice and her associated television broadcasts have been subjects of controversy, leading to legal proceedings, including arrests and convictions.

== Early life and career ==
Nana Agradaa, began her public life as a traditional priestess. She became widely known for promoting rituals that claimed to multiply money, which she advertised on television and at her shrine in Sowutuom, Accra

== Conversion and Evangelism ==
In April 2021, she announced her conversion to Christianity, stating that she had abandoned her traditional religious practices and destroyed the items associated with her "Sika Gari" rituals. She adopted the title Evangelist Patricia Oduro Koranteng and established the Heaven Way Church.

== Media operations and legal issues ==
She owned Thunder TV and Ice1 TV, which were raided by authorities in April 2021 and subsequently shut down for operating without the required broadcast licenses. In October 2022, she was arrested and remanded on allegations of running a money‑doubling scam, luring congregants to pay sums in hopes of getting them multiplied, in violation of Ghanaian law. She was subjected to court proceedings, during which bail was denied on several occasions. In 2021, she was convicted on charges of fraudulent advertising and operating a television station without a license, and was fined a total of GH₵46,000.

== Personal life ==
She is married to Angel Asiamah, a Christian minister.
