= Assin Kyekyewere =

- Town and District Capital
- Location of Assin Kyekyewere in Central Region
- Coordinates: 5°30′N 1°2′W
- Country: Ghana
- Region: Central Region
- District: Assin South District
- Demonym: Nsuaemian
- Time zone: GMT
  - Summer (DST): GMT
- Ethnicity: Akan people

Assin Kyekyewere is a small town and is the district capital of Assin South district in the Central Region of Ghana. Due to its proximity to Assin Nsuaem, it is often mistaken to be part of the same town.
