= Ahmed Hussein-Suale =

Ghanaian undercover investigative journalist (1987–2019)

- Born: 5 December 1987; Accra, Ghana
- Died: 16 January 2019 (aged 31); Accra, Ghana
- Cause of death: assassinated
- Occupation: Investigative journalist
- Website: www.tigereyepi.org

Ahmed Hussein-Suale (5 December 1987 – 16 January 2019) was a Ghanaian undercover investigative journalist and an associate of fellow Ghanaian investigative journalist Anas Aremeyaw Anas. He died on Wednesday, 16 January 2019, when unidentified men on motorbikes shot him three times, twice in the chest and once in his neck in his vehicle.

== Notable investigative works ==
Ahmed was a member of the investigative firm Tiger Eye Private Investigations which investigated corruption in the Ghana Football Association named Number 12, which led to the removal of office and a lifetime ban of its President Kwesi Nyantakyi. In response, Kennedy Agyapong – a Ghanaian member of parliament – called for retaliation against Hussein-Suale.

He was also part of an investigative journalism piece in collaboration with the BBC into human body parts sold for ritual magic in Malawi.

== Assassination ==
Ahmed was murdered on 16 January 2019 in his vehicle by two unidentified men on motorbikes. He was shot twice in the chest and once in the neck.

On 16 January 2020, a renowned international journalist, Guillaume Perrier published findings of a private investigation into the murder of Ahmed Hussein Suale as part of Forbidden Stories.

Kwei Quartey dedicates his novel "The Missing American" to Ahmed with these words, "To Ahmed Hussein-Suale, a Ghanaian journalist martyred on Wednesday, January 16, 2019". (2020: Soho Press, NY, NY, page v.)

On Tuesday, October 14, 2025, the criminal case against one of the suspects in Ahmed’s assassination, Daniel Owusu Koranteng, was discontinued on the advice of the Attorney General of Ghana, leading the presiding judge at the Madina District Court to discharge the suspect due to the lack of evidence to prosecute him.
