= Christian Service University =

Private higher-education institution in Ghana

- CSU
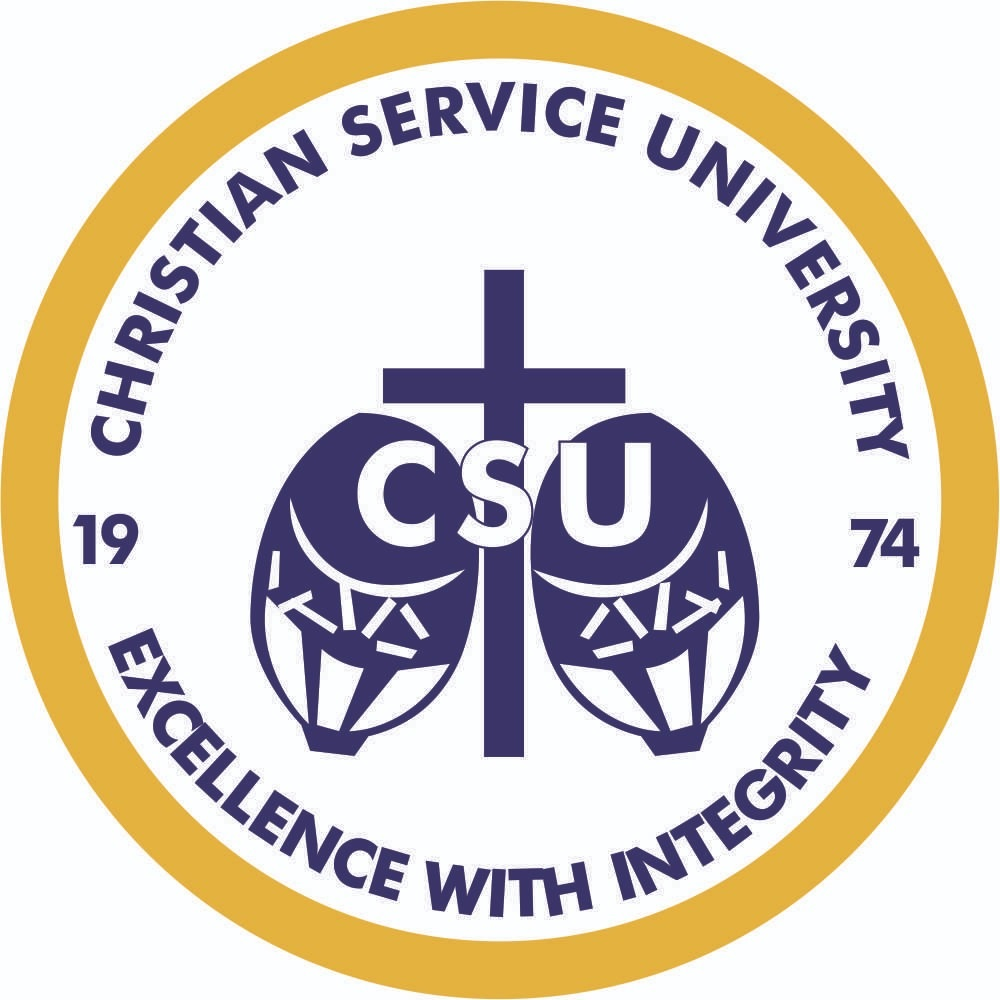
- Other names: CSU
- Motto: Excellence With Integrity
- Type: Private
- Established: October 1974; 51 years agoOctober 1974
- Academic affiliations: Eastern University, U.S.
- Chairman: Rev. Prof. Frimpong Manso (Council Chairman)
- Vice-Chancellor: Samuel Kofi Afrane
- Students: 2,700
- Location: Christian Service University; P. O. Box 3110, Kumasi, Ashanti Region, Ghana; 05°46′33″N 00°08′20″W
- Campus: Urban
- Colors: Blue and white
- Website: www.csuc.edu.gh

The Christian Service University is one of the university accredited by the National Accreditation Board in the past decade. It is located in Kumasi, the second largest city in Ghana.

== History ==
The Worldwide Evangelization for Christ (WEC) had acquired property in Kumasi on which they had built four dwelling houses and a radio studio with plans to construct a large building to serve as the beginning of a training college.

In October 1974, the first residential classes started with four students; by 2020, the college had become an evangelical Christian university.

== Campus ==
The university is based on a main campus within Kumasi, the capital of the Ashanti Region.

== Programmes ==
Undergraduate (Degree Programmes)

- Bachelor of Arts in Theology with Administration
- Bachelor of Arts in Communication Studies
- Bachelor of Arts in Planning and Social Development
- Bachelor of Science in Midwifery
- Bachelor of Science in Nursing
- Bachelor of Science in Cyber Security
- Bachelor of Science in Computer science
- Bachelor Of Science In Information Technology
- Bachelor of Business Administration: Human Resource Management
- Bachelor of Business Administration: Marketing
- Bachelor of Business Administration: Accounting
- Bachelor of Business Administration: Banking and Finance
- Diploma in Business Administration

Postgraduate (Master Programmes)

- Master of Arts in Christian Ministry with Management
- Master of Science in Accounting and Finance
- Master of Science in Monitoring and Evaluation
- Master of Science in Corporate Planning and Governance
- MPhil in English Education
- MPhil in Mathematics
- MA/ Mphil in Communication Studies
- Master of Science in Digital Marketing and Supply Chain
- Master of Arts in Event Management

== Students and faculty ==
The university has 161 support and faculty staff. The student population as at June 2025 is 2,700

== Students' Representative Council ==
The university has a students union known as the Students Representative Council. This has existed since 1983.

== See also ==
- List of universities in Ghana
