= Assin Central Municipal District =

- Municipal District
- Districts of Central Region

- Location of Assin Central Municipal District within Central
- Coordinates: 5°42′11.52″N 1°16′54.48″W
- Country: Ghana
- Region: Central
- Capital: Assin Fosu

Government
  - Municipal Chief Executive: Hon. Alex D. Antwi Bosiako

Population (2021)
  - Total: 88,753
- Time zone: UTC+0 (GMT)
- ISO 3166 code: GH-CP-

Assin Central Municipal District (a.k.a. Assin Fosu Municipal District) is one of the twenty-two districts in Central Region, Ghana. Originally it was formerly part of the then-larger Assin District in 1988, until the southern part of the district was split off to create Assin South District on 18 February 2004; thus the remaining part has been renamed as the first Assin North District, which it was later elevated to municipal district assembly status on 29 February 2008 to become Assin North Municipal District. However on 15 March 2018, the southern part of the district was split off to create the present Assin North District; thus the remaining part has been renamed as Assin Central Municipal District. The municipality is located in the northwest part of Central Region and has Assin Fosu as its capital town.

== List of settlements ==
Settlements of Assin Central Municipal District
No.	Settlement	Population	Population year
1	Assin Achiano		
2	Assin Akonfudi		
3	Assin Akropong		
4	Assin Asempaneye		
5	Assin Atonsu		
6	Assin Awsem		
7	Assin Bediadua (Assin Bungalow)		
8	Assin Breku		
9	Assin Brofoyedur		
10	Assin Dansame		
11	Assin Dompim		
12	Assin Endwa		
13	Assin Fosu	20541	2013
14	Assin Juaso		
15	Assin Kushea		
16	Assin Manso		
17	Assin Nsuta		
18	Assin Nyankomasi		
19	Assin Praso		
20	Assin Wurakese		
21	Taylor Nkwanta		
22	Fanti Nyankomasi		
23	Akenkausu		

== Sources ==
- "Assin Central Municipal District". Statoids.
- District: Assin Central Municipal District
