= Alhaji Umar B. Bodinga =

Ghanaian politician

Umar B. Bodinga
- Incumbent
- Assumed office 2021
- President: Nana Akufo-Addo

Personal details
- Born: Kukurantumi
- Party: New Patriotic Party
- Occupation: Politician

Alhaji Umar B. Bodinga is a Ghanaian politician. He was born in Kukurantumi where he spent his entire life since 1996. As a member of the New Patriotic Party, he was part of the first constituency executives who fought for the parliamentary ambition of the current president, Nana Akufo-Addo. In 1996, he was the constituency's second Vice Chairman for the then Abuakwa Central. He served as the assembly member for the then East-Akyem District. He served the constituency for 6 years and then contested for Regional Second Vice-chairman position in 2004 which he won and served for one term. Alhaji Umar B. Bodinga is currently the Municipal Chief Executive of Abuakwa North Municipal of the Eastern Region, Ghana after he was nominated by President Nana Akufo Addo of the New Patriotic Party and confirmed by the assembly members of municipality.
