= Alhaji Habu Adamu Jajere =

Nigerian businessman (born 1954)

Independent Petroleum Marketers Association Of Nigeria
- In office 2003–2007
- Preceded by: Bestman P. Anekwe

Personal details
- Born: 1954 (age 71–72) Katagum, Bauchi State, Nigeria
- Education: University of East London

Alhaji Habu Adamu Jajere, NPOM (born 1954) is a Nigerian businessman who was the former president of the Independent Petroleum Marketers Association Of Nigeria (IPMAN), a body he led for four years.

== Early life and education ==
Jajere was born in 1954. He holds an HND in Advanced Marketing from North East London Polytechnic

== Career ==
He began his career in the public sector as a civil servant in the Bauchi State Ministry of Commerce be he moved to the Nigerian National Petroleum Corporation (NNPC) with 15 year of expertise in Pipeline and product marketing and later became the CEO of Hajaaj Nigeria Ltd. He became the alternate Director at NIPCO PLC in 2010. Habu Jajere was awarded the Kwame Nkrumah African Leadership Award in Ghana.. He represented Nigerian Association of Chambers of Commerce, Industry, Mines and Agriculture and was recognized with the "NPOM" award by President Muhammadu Buhari in 2021.
