= Alhaji Chief Mucktarru-Kallay =

Politician in Sierra Leone

Alhaji Chief Alimamy Mucktarru-Kallay was a politician in Sierra Leone. He formed the All People's Congress (APC) at Elba Corner in Freetown by seven leaders (Mucktarru-Kallay, Hon Allieu Badarr Koroma, Alhaji Gibrill Sesay, Hon C A Kamara-Taylor, Hon Kawusu-Conteh, Hon S A T Koroma and Mr. Abu B.S.Bangura).

== Diplomacy ==
On 24 September 1960, an outspoken critic of the SLPP government, Siaka Stevens, joined the alliance with several northern politicians including Alhaji Chief MucktarruKallay Alhaji Gibrill Sesay Sorie Ibrahim Koroma, Christian Alusine-Kamara Taylor, Mohammed Bash-Taqui, S.A.T. Koroma, Kawusu Konteh, Allieu Badarr Koroma, S.A. Fofana and Abu Bakarr S Bangura in opposition to the SLPP government. Stevens took advantage of the dissatisfaction with the ruling SLPP among some prominent politicians from the Northern part of Sierra Leone to form the APC. Stevens used the Northern part of Sierra Leone as his political base. Pa Siaka Probyn Stevens joined the APC on 24 September 1960.

Sierra Leone and the United Kingdom signed a secret defence pact. Another point of contention by Stevens was the Sierra Leonean government's position, that there would be no elections held before independence which would effectively shut him out of Sierra Leone's political process. Upon their return to Freetown on 4 May 1960, Stevens was expelled from the People's National Party (PNP).
