= Ghana Insurance College =

Ghana Insurance College is a professional college in Accra, Ghana. The school was established by four major insurance bodies, the National Insurance Commission (NIC), Ghana Insurers Association (GIA), Ghana Insurance Brokers Association (GIBA) and the Insurance Institute of Ghana (IIG). The aim of the school is to provide training and education for insurers.
