= Assin North District =

- District
- Districts of Central Region

- Location of Assin North District within Central
- Coordinates: 5°51′55.08″N 1°20′26.52″W
- Country: Ghana
- Region: Central
- Capital: Assin Bereku

Area
  - Total: 624.2 km^{2} (241.0 sq mi)

Population (2021)
  - Total: 80,539
  - Density: 129.0/km^{2} (334.2/sq mi)
- Time zone: UTC+0 (GMT)
- ISO 3166 code: GH-CP-

Assin North District is one of the twenty-two districts in Central Region, Ghana. Originally it was formerly part of the then-larger and first Assin North Municipal District on 18 February 2004, until the southern part of the district was split off to create the present Assin North District on 15 March 2018; thus the remaining part has been renamed as Assin Central Municipal District. The district assembly is located in the northwest part of Central Region and has Assin Bereku as its capital town.

== Sources ==
- "Assin North District". Statoids.
