= Assin Fosu =

Assin Fosu Assin Foso
- Considered as a secondary city and Municipal Capital
- Nickname: Foso
- Location of Assin Fosu in Central Region
- Coordinates: 5°42′00″N 1°16′40″W
- Country: Ghana
- Region: Central Region
- District: Assin Foso Municipal Assembly
- Elevation: 351 ft (107 m)

Population (2013)
  - Total: 80,541
- Ranked 65th in Ghana
- Demonym: Assin Fosan
- Time zone: GMT
  - Summer (DST): GMT
- Postal code: CR CN
- Ethnicity: Akan people

Assin Fosu is the capital of Assin Fosu Municipal Assembly, in the Central Region of Ghana. Assin Fosu is the 65th most populous settlement in Ghana, with a population of about 70,541. The town is the second training grounds for the Ghana Immigration service recruits and also, known for the government senior high, Obiri Yeboah Secondary School. The school is a second cycle institution.

== Notable people ==
- Dominic Frimpong
