= Efo Kodjo Mawugbe =

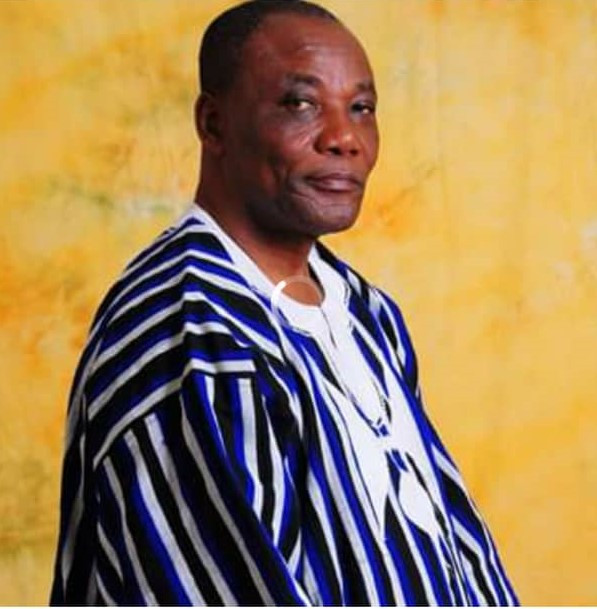
- Born: 21 April 1954; Kumasi, Ghana
- Died: 14 September 2011 (aged 57); Accra, Ghana
- Education: Mawuli School
- Alma mater: University of Ghana
- Occupation: Writer
- Notable work: Prison Graduates

Efo Kodjo Mawugbe (10 May 1954 – 14 September 2011) was a Ghanaian playwright, dramatist, theatre administrator, and a poet. He served as a Deputy Executive Director(Artistic) of the National Theatre of Ghana and founded Theatre Kilimanjaro, a theatre company dedicated to promoting Ghanaian drama. A graduate of University of Ghana, He also taught playwriting at the university. He was also a judge of TV3's Ghana's Most Beautiful Television show. In 2009, he won the BBC World Service and British International Radio Playwriting Competition for his play Prison Graduate.

== Education ==
Efo Kodjo Mawugbe was a student of Mawuli School where he got his General Certificate of Education (GCE) Ordinary and Advanced Levels before proceeding to study Theatre Arts at the University of Ghana from 1975 to 1978. He later studied a certificate programme in Theatre Management and Audience Development at the British Council in Glasgow and London. In 1991, Mawugbe pursued a certificate course in Senior Management Development at the Ghana Institute of Public Management (GIMPA). He also studied at the Bauff Centre for Management, Calgary, Canada in 1995.

== Career ==
After graduating from the University of Ghana, Mawugbe worked as a Senior Research Assistant in African Theatre at the Centre for Cultural Studies of the Kwame Nkrumah University of Science and Technology (KNUST) from 1979 to 1984.

Mawugbe subsequently served in several leadership roles within Ghana's cultural sector, including Regional Director of Arts and Culture, Director of Programmes and International Relations at the National Commission on Culture, and Deputy Executive Director (Artistic) of the National Theatre of Ghana.

He served as Festival Director of the National Festival of Arts and Culture (NAFAC) in 2003. Between 2001 and 2002, he was a part-time Assistant Lecturer in Playwriting at the University of Ghana, where he supervised final-year playwriting students.

== Selected works ==
Mawugbe wrote numerous dramatic works for the stage and radio, many of which explored themes of leadership, gender, justice, African cultural identity, and social change. His works have been performed, studied, and published in different formats, contributing significantly to contemporary Ghanaian theatre and literary scholarship, with In the Chest of a Woman and Prison Graduates among his best-known works.

Genre	Title	Year/Notes
Play	In the Chest of a Woman	Isaac Books & Stationery Services 2008
Radio Play	Prison Graduates	African Publication, 2015(winner of the 2009 BBC World Service & British Council International Radio Playwriting)
Fiction	My Father's Song	African Publication 2015
Play	A Calabash of Blood	Early radio drama produced by the Ghana Broadcasting Corporation (1978).
Play	The Unbending Branch	Radio drama produced by the Ghana Broadcasting Corporation (1980).
Play	The Royals	Stage play
Play	G-Yard People	Stage play, later referred to as Graveyard People in some source

== Awards ==
Throughout his career, Mawugbe received several honors and recognitions for his contributions to Ghanaian theatre and literature. His awards reflected both national and international recognition of his work as a playwright and theatre practitioner.

Year	Award	Notes
1979	VALCO Literary Award	Literary award recognizing Mawugbe's contribution to creative writing.
1984	Playwright of the Year	Awarded by ECRAG/ACRAG (verify the exact organization name from the source before publishing).
1990	Japan Foundation Award	Cultural Personalities from Africa Short-Term Visit Programme
1995	Chicago Artists International Programme	Awardee.
1995	Playwriting Contest	Third Prize.
2009	BBC World Service and British Council International Radio Playwriting Competition	Won for Prison Graduates.
