= Agbesi =

Agbesi is a name. Notable people with the name include:

- Alfred Kwame Agbesi (1955–2025), Ghanaian lawyer and politician
- Nelson Agbesi (1939–2016), Ghanaian barrister and politician
- Alfred Agbesi Woyome (born 1965), Ghanaian businessman
