= Smile Dzisi =

Vice-chancellor of Koforidua Tech. University

Smile Afua Gavua Dzisi was born on 18 June 1971, to Rev. Eusebius Kofi Gavua and Mrs Rebecca Dzandu Gavua from Wusuta in the Volta Region of Ghana. She was the first female to be appointed rector in the history of the Koforidua Polytechnic now Koforidua Technical University. She is the current interim vice chancellor of the Koforidua Technical University.

== Early life ==
Professor Smile Dzisi was born 18 June 1971 in Wusuta, in the Volta Region of Ghana. She had her basic education at Saviefe Agorkpo, a rural community near Ho in the Volta Region. After her basic education, she got admitted at Mawuli School and obtained her GCE ‘O’ Level and GCE ‘A’ Level certificates.

Smile later furthered her education at the Kwame Nkrumah University of science and Technology where she received a Bachelor of Arts degree in Social Sciences from Kwame Nkrumah University of Science and Technology. She also received a Master of Public Administration degree from University of Ghana, Legon

In 2005 she studied for a Doctor of Philosophy in Entrepreneurship and Innovation at Swinburne University of Technology in Australia

== Career ==
Dzisi began her career as a teacher at St. Roses Secondary School at Akwatia. In 1999, she was appointed a Lecturer at Koforidua Polytechnic now Koforidua Technical University. On 1 August 2015, she became the first ever female in the history of Koforidua Technical University to become a rector.

She later became the Vice Chancellor of the school and now the Interim Vice Chancellor of Koforidua Technical University. She has also held some positions in the school including Head of Marketing, Campus Coordinator, Director of Research and New Programmes, and Acting Deputy Registrar (Academic), Head of Department of Purchasing and Supply.

She is a member of the International Society for Professional Innovation Management, and Australian and New Zealand Academy of Management.

Dzisi is currently the vice chairperson of the Commonwealth Association of Technical Universities and Polytechnics, comprising Cameroun, Nigeria, Ghana, The Gambia and Sierra Leone.

== Honours ==
Some of the honours received include the Name in Science and Education Award by the Academic Union and the Club of Rectors of Europe, United Kingdom, the 4th Ghana Women of Excellence Award, the Daasebre Silver Jubilee Award for Excellence in Higher Education Management She was appointed as the Vice Chairperson of the Commonwealth Association of Technical Universities and Polytechnics at its recently held 52nd meeting in Kenya

== Personal life ==
Professor Dzisi is married to Dr. Stephen Yao Dzisi a medical practitioner with three children.
