= Mawuko Girls Senior High School =

Mawuko Girls' High School

Location
- Ho, Ho Municipal District, Volta Region; Ghana; 6°35′45″N 0°28′20″E

Information
- Type: Public Secondary/High School
- Religious affiliation: Evangelical Presbyterian Church
- Established: 1983; 43 years ago
- Gender: Girls

E.P.C Mawuko Girls' High school, Ghana, is an educational institution for girls founded by the late Reverend Professor Noah Komla Dzobo of the Evangelical Presbyterian Church, Ghana.

== History ==
The school was established in 1983 and gained the status of a Boarding School in 1997. Courses taught include Business, Home Economics, Visual Arts and Performing Arts. Ms. Janet Kwasi was Headmistress of the school as of 2014. The school is the second senior high school for girls in Ho, the capital city of the Volta region and maintains the motto, "Educate a woman for God and educate a whole nation for God."

== Programs Offered ==
- Business
- Agriculture
- Home Economics
- Visual Arts
- General Arts
- General Science

== Notable alumni ==
- Emefa Akosua Adeti, Ghanaian model and television personality
- Selase Agbenyefia, first Ghanaian female helicopter pilot
- Victoria Michaels, model, fashion icon, actress, brand ambassador and philanthropist
- Juliet Bawuah, Ghanaian sports journalist
