= In the Chest of a Woman =

2008 drama by Efo Kodjo Mawugbe

- Author: Efo Kodjo Mawugbe
- Language: English
- Genre: Drama
- Published: 2008
- Publisher: Isaac Books & Stationery services
- Publication place: Ghana
- Pages: 106
- ISBN: 9789988116248

In the Chest of a Woman is a drama written by Efo Kodjo Mawugbe, a popular Ghanaian playwright. It was published in 2008 by Isaac Books & Stationery Services (IBSS) in Kumasi Ghana. It is a play in six parts, printed over 106 pages. It focused on women, male-female relationships, and female contributions to society.

== Premise ==
A play set in the Asante Empire, In the Chest of a Woman is about a woman who disguised her daughter as a boy so that she became the empire's king. The play revolves around the girl's difficulty in life after she grows.
