= Oscar Korbla Mawuli Awuku =

Ghanaian artist (born 1999)

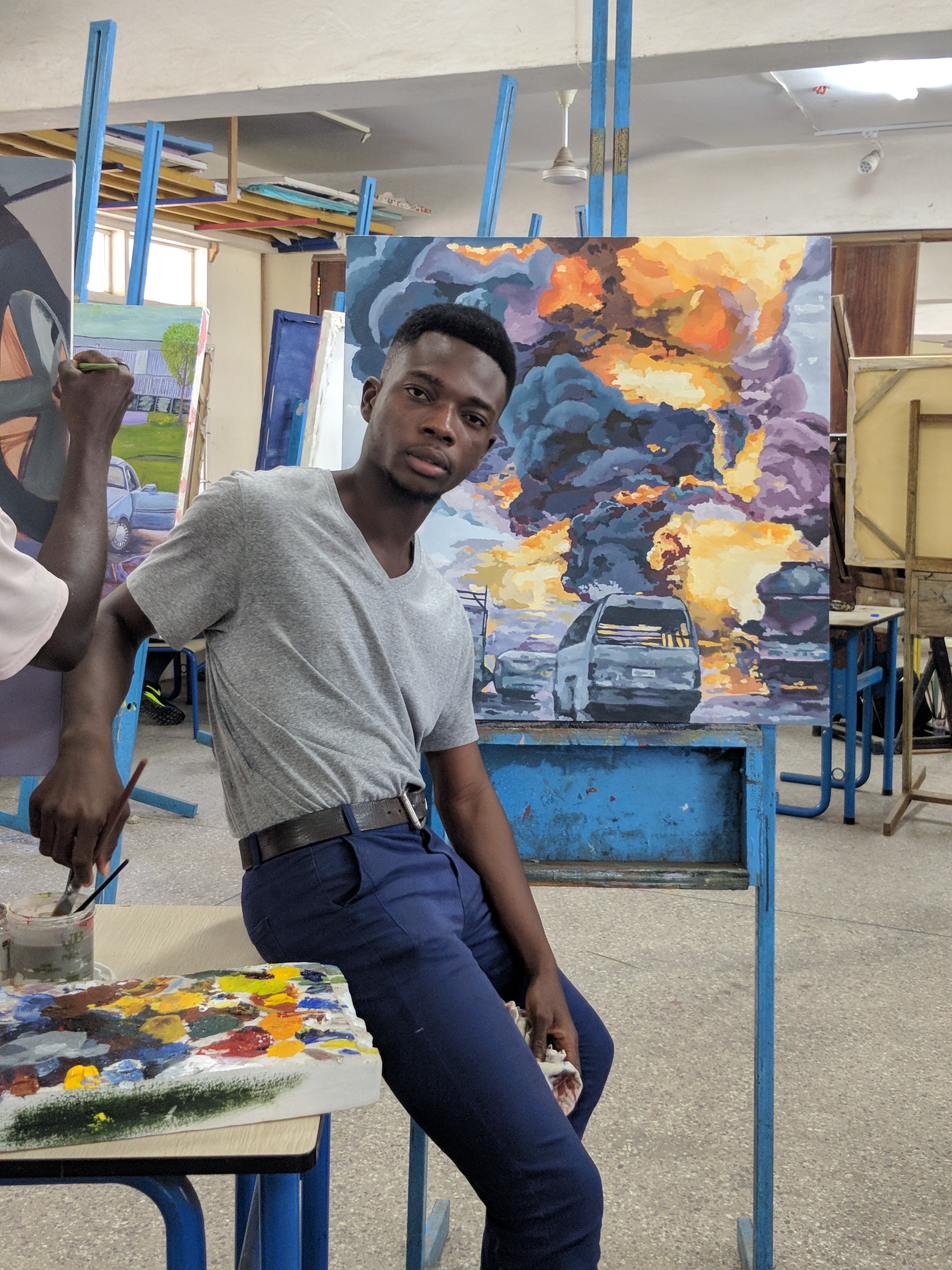
- Awuku in 2019
- Born: 18 May 1999 (age 27); Accra, Ghana
- Education: Mawuli School
- Known for: Body art
- Movement: Anansinisim

Oscar Korbla Mawuli Awuku (born 18 May 1999), better known as Yonga Arts, the name of his artistic brand, is a Ghanaian body artist, painter, and sculptor.

== Early life and education ==
Awuku was born in Accra to Maxwell Awuku and Bridgette Dzidzineyo as the first of three boys. He got his basic school education at Senajoy Preparatory School in Accra and later went to Mawuli School, where he studied visual arts.

He was primarily raised by his mother, who supported his artistic interests from a young age. In a 2020 interview with GhanaWeb, he said,

" whilst growing up, all I ever wanted to do was depict the strength and empowerment of women and also their ability to procreate and nurture."

Awuku is currently studying commercial arts in painting at Takoradi Technical University, Sekondi-Takoradi.

== Career ==
Awuku calls his art Anansinism, inspired by the Akan mythical spider character Kweku Anansi. He often depicts historical Ghanaian Adinkra symbology on the bodies which he paints.

In 2020, he was nominated in the Ghana Arts and Culture Awards.

=== Yonga Arts ===
According to Awuku, his original intent was to use body art as therapy for the elderly, to make them feel young at heart, and this is how he came up with his brand name—Yonga Arts.

=== Short film ===
In November 2020, Awuku announced that he would be releasing a short film showcasing his art, titled Supremacy.

=== Artistic style ===
Awuku has said that his work "explores pre-colonial culture but also addresses decolonized practices in contemporary culture"; it looks at the essence of identity of the black body, while advocating for women and seeking to ask empowering questions in society. Referring to the motif of the traditional mask, he says, "My constant use of the ritual mask is based on the belief that it conceptually turns its wearer into the spirit represented by the mask itself."

== Gallery ==
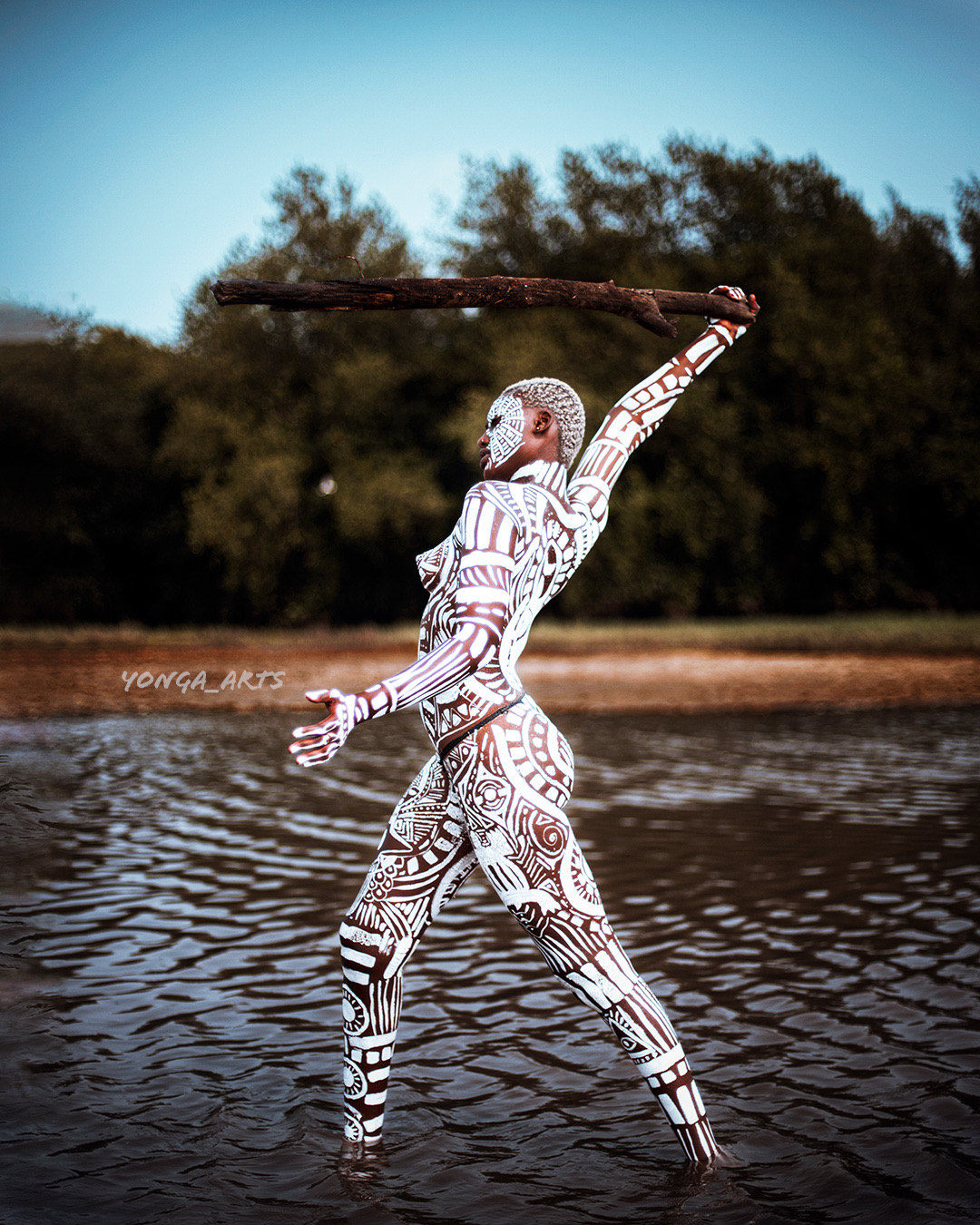

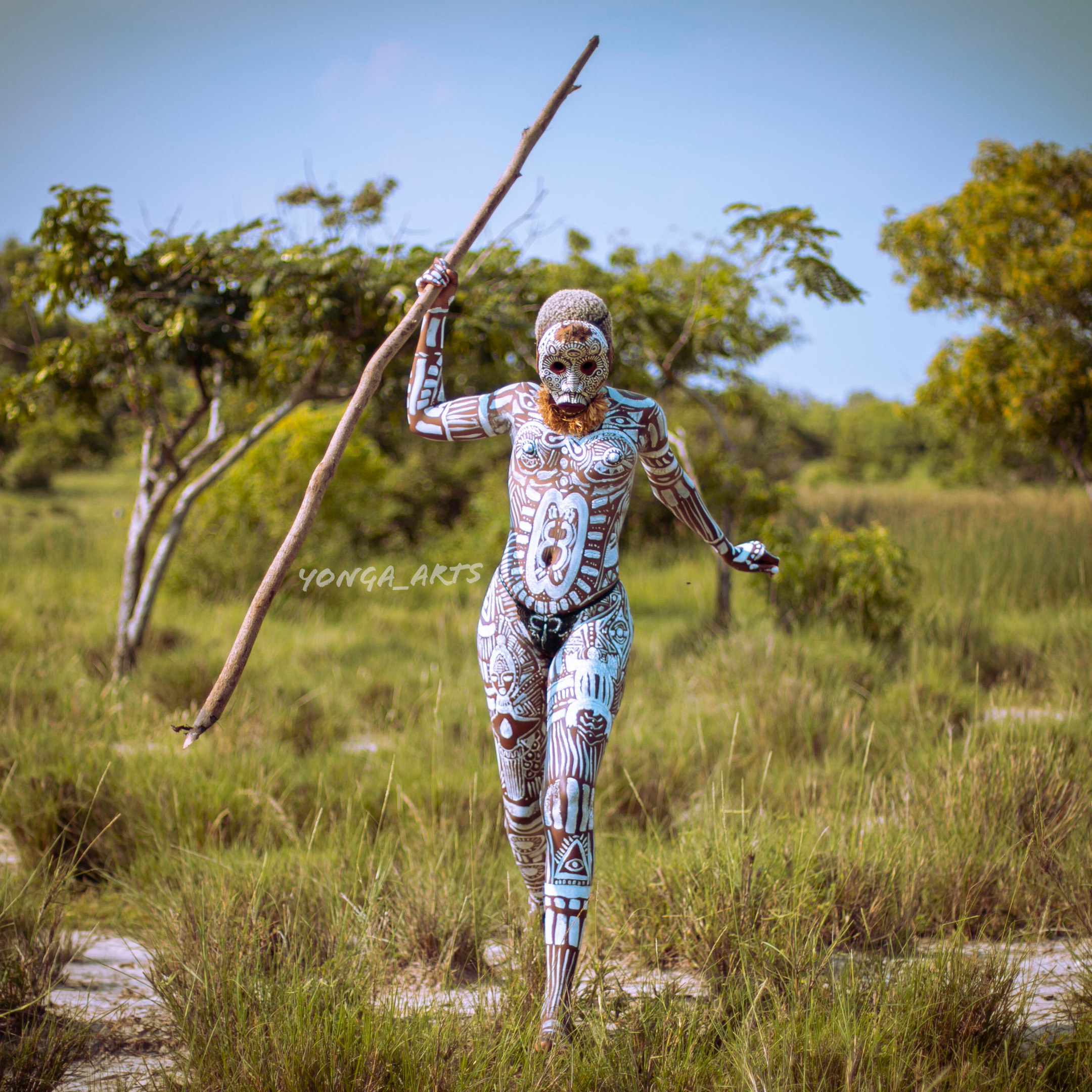

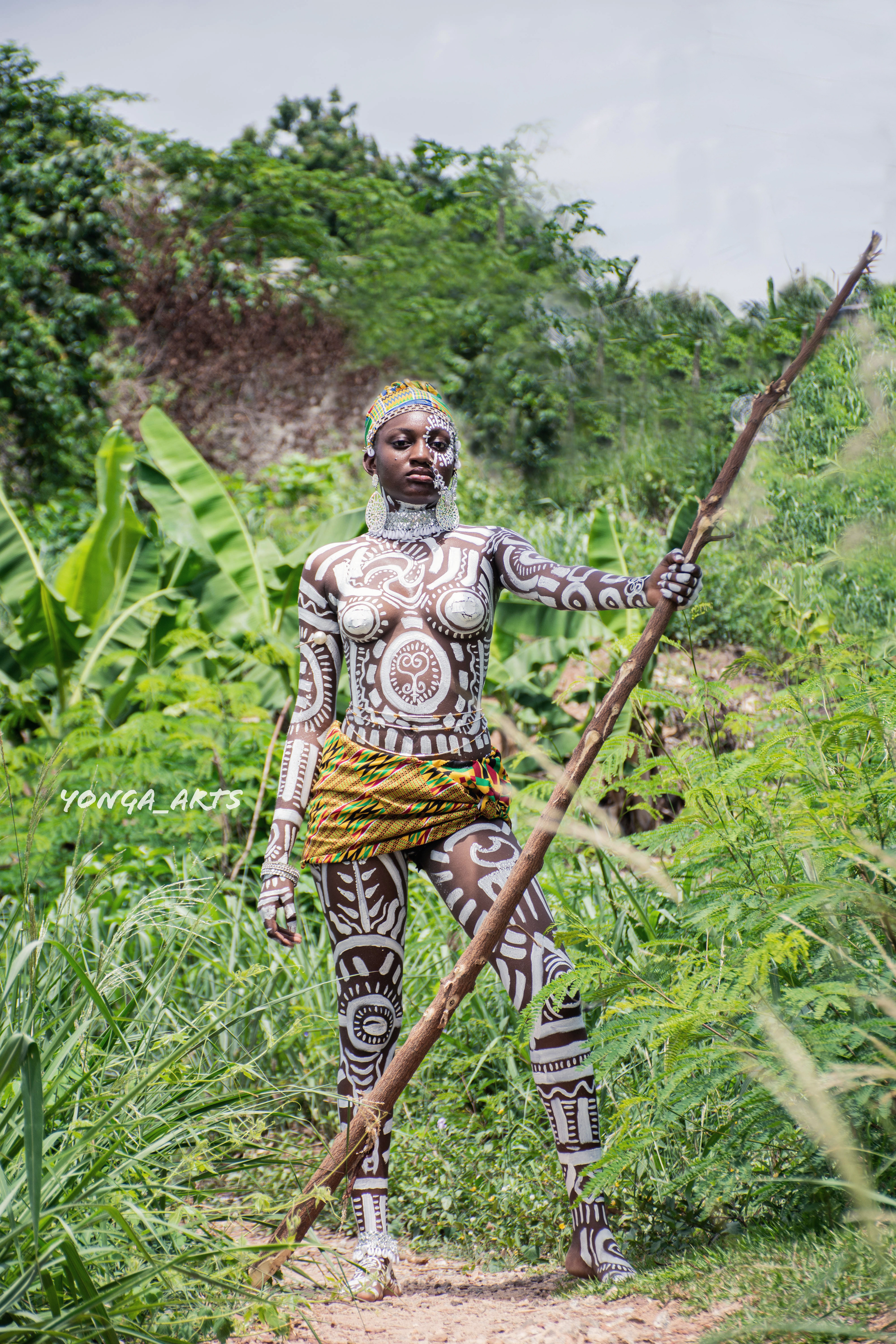

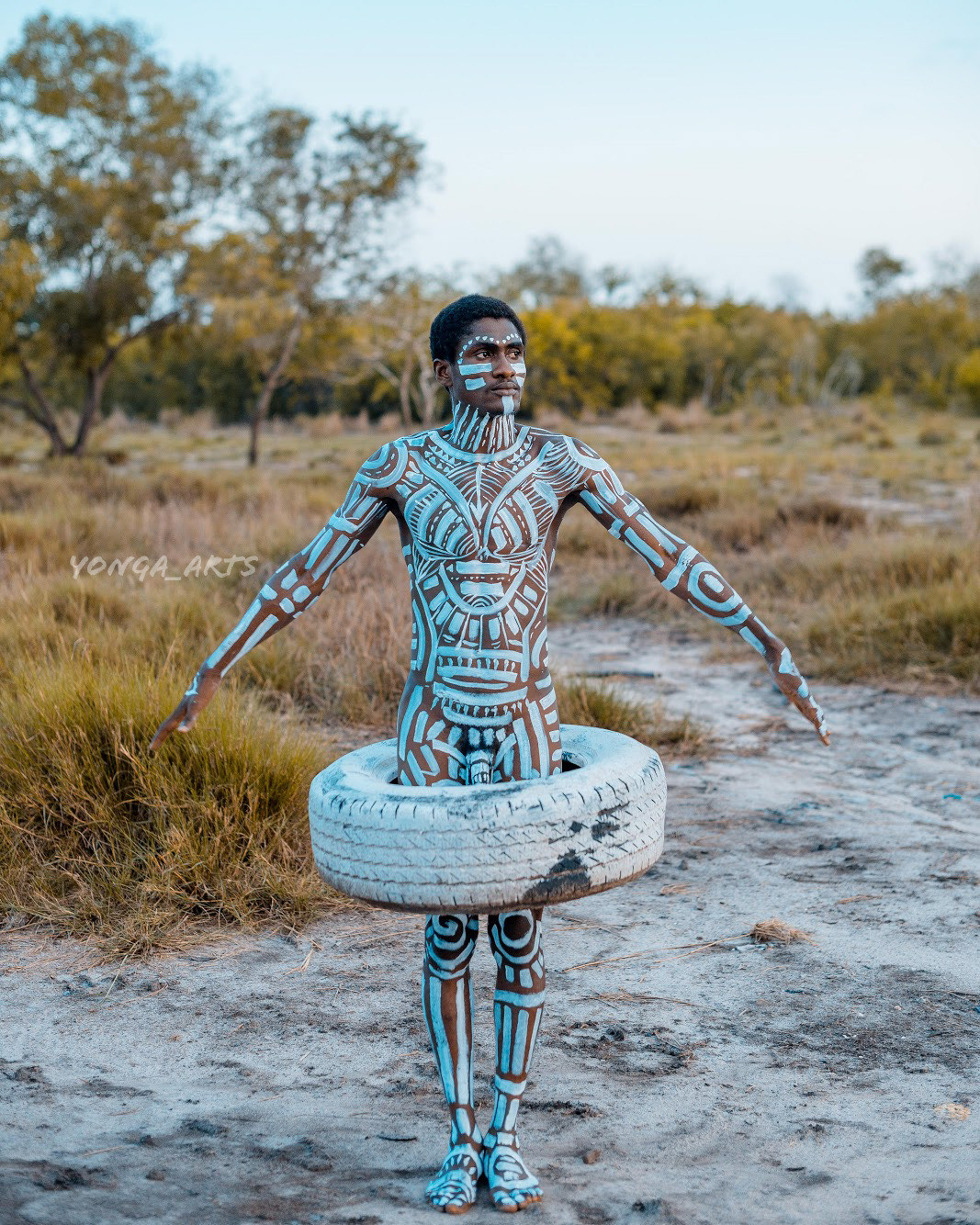

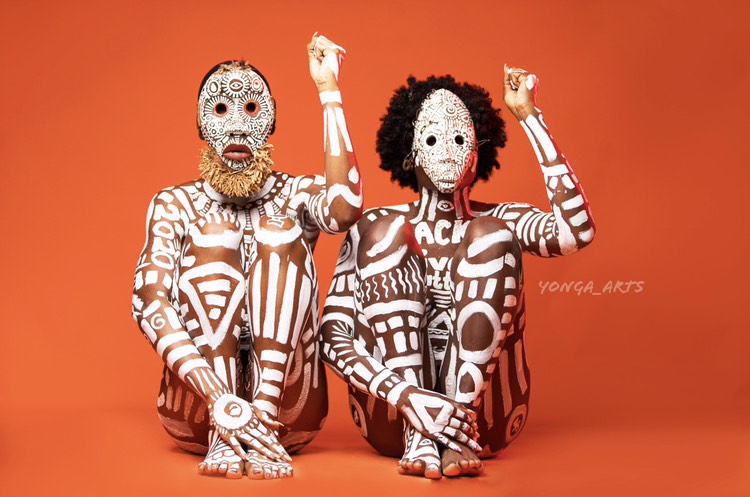

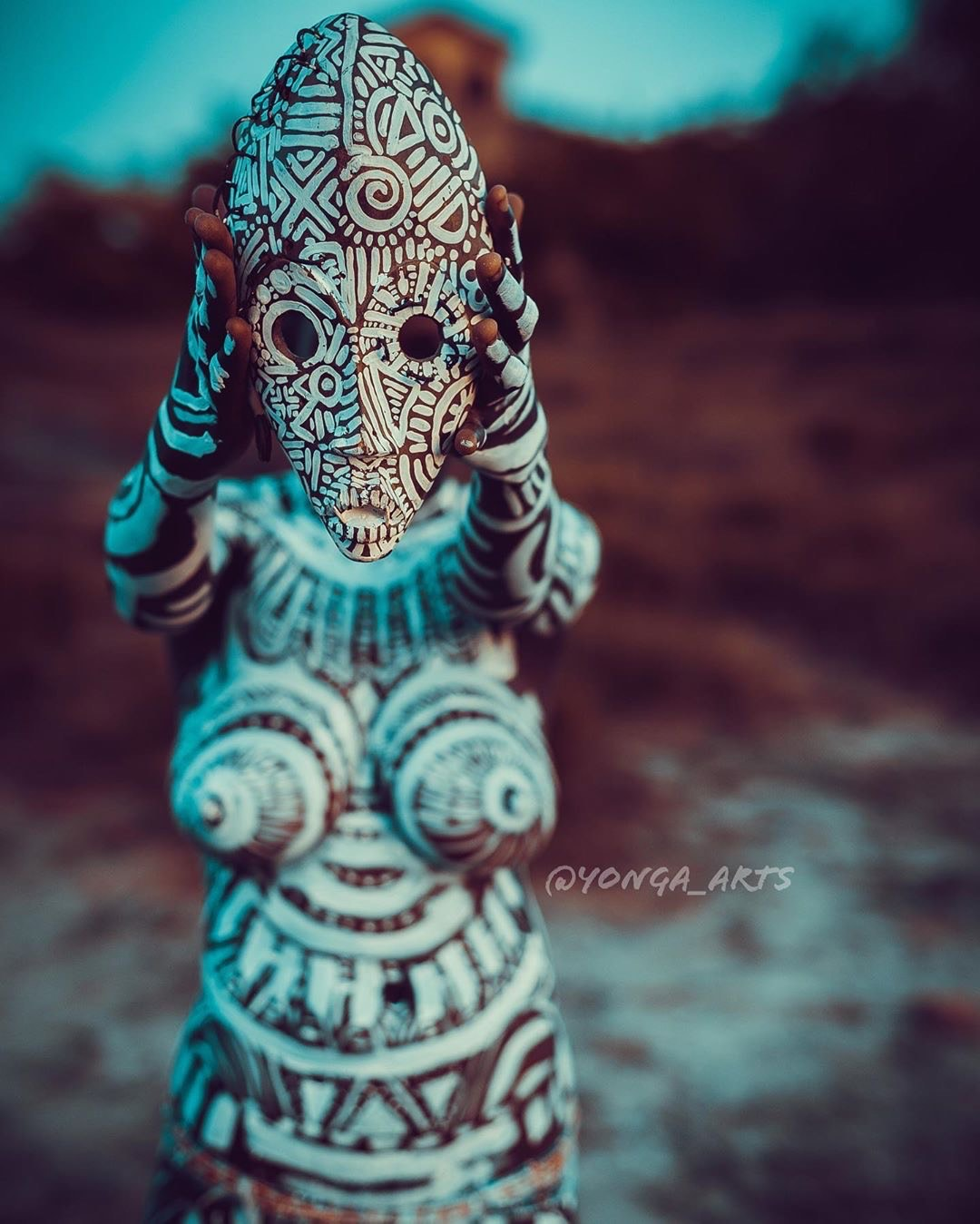
