= Juliet Bawuah =

Ghanaian sports journalist

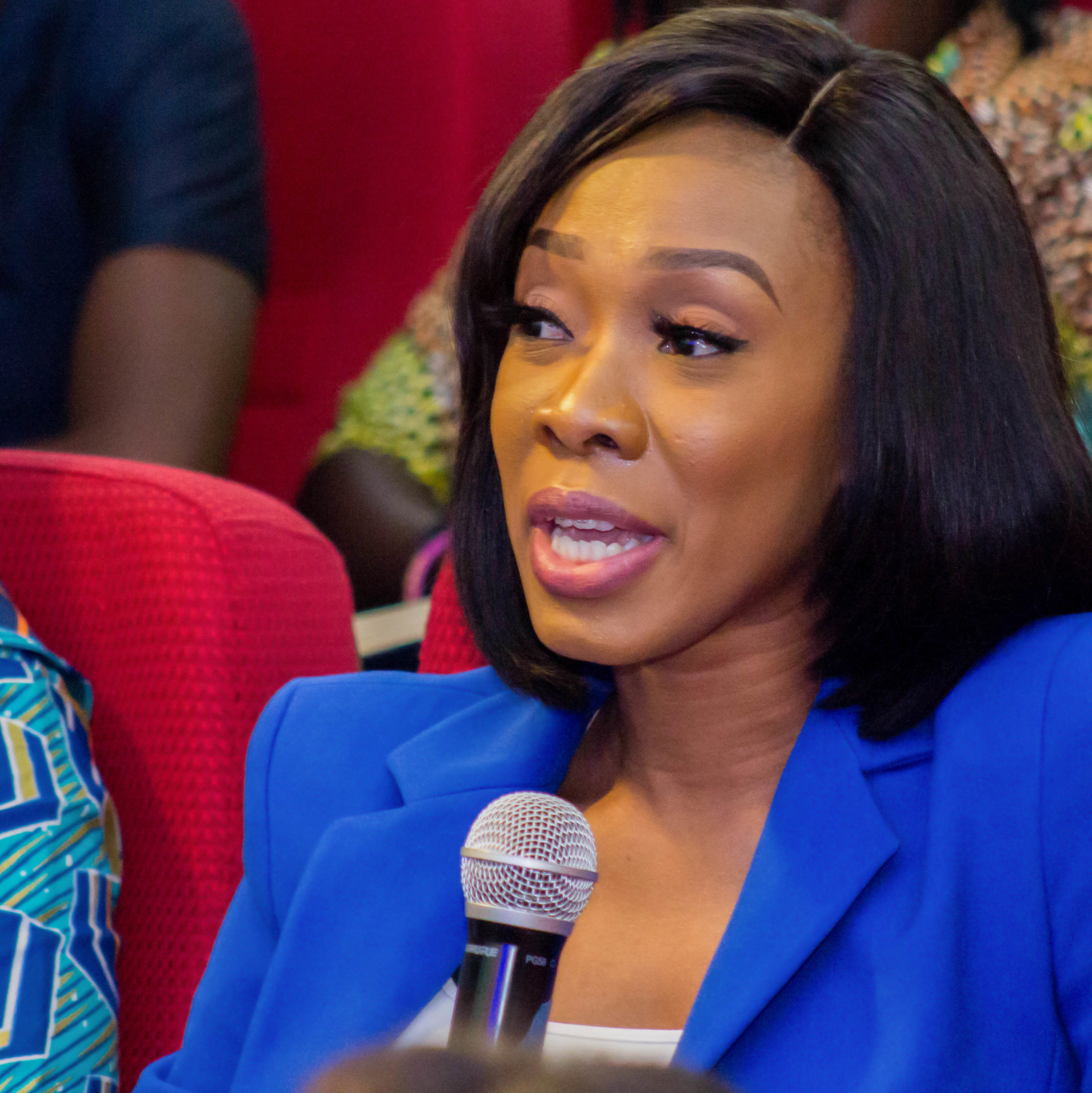
- Juliet Bawuah, speaking at the Africa Women's Sports Summit
- Born: Ghana
- Occupation: Journalist
- Known for: Africa Women's Sports Summit

Juliet Bawuah is a Ghanaian sports journalist who has written for top media houses. She has interviewed FIFA President, Gianni Infantino as well as the former World Player of the Year and former Liberia President George Weah. She became well known as a result of her interview with Gianni Infantino, on the sidelines of a FIFA Summit in the North-Western African country, Mauritania. She also founded the Africa Women's Sports Summit, a program that brings together Africa's leading female sports names and aspiring ones.

== Education ==
After having her secondary education at Mawuko Girls Senior High School, Bawuah graduated from the Ghana Institute of Journalism with a Bachelor of Arts degree in journalism and public relations. She also holds a diploma in communication studies from the African University College of Communications. She is an alumna of Radio Netherlands Training Center in the Netherlands. In 2018, she got her master's degree in international public relations and global communications at Cardiff University. She also participated in the US State Department-sponsored International Visitor Leadership Program (IVLP).

== Career ==
Before she started working at TV3 in July 2013, she worked with Goal.com, CITI FM, the Globe Newspaper, Cafonline.com, Metro TV, and ETV. Prior to furthering her studies at Cardiff University, she worked with Euronews’ sister station Africanews based in Congo as the host of Football Planet and covered the 2017 AFCON tournament. She has appeared on BBC as well and contributes for the Turkish broadcaster TRT. She also contributed to Premier League TV, LA Liga TV and Aljazeera.

She is the founder of Africa Women's Sports Summit, which was first hosted on 15 May 2019 in Accra. The Africa Women's Sports Summit is a gathering of Africa's leading female sports names and aspiring ones.

She was appointed as a member of Women’s Premier League Super Cup’s Local Organizing Committee (LOC).

== Philanthropy ==
Bawuah was an ambassador for the UNAIDS’ ‘Protect the Goal’ campaign. She was one of the known Ghanaians to pledge commitment to the campaign, which was an initiative between UNAIDS and FIFA, to advocate for the prevention of HIV infection through sports.

== Achievements and awards ==
In 2015, she was nominated for the Sport Media Pearl Awards. While in 2017, she was named as part of the panel of voting experts for the African Football of the Year Awards by the Confederation of African Football. And recently, she joined the voting panel for the BBC African Footballer of the Year, one of the most respected schemes in the football world. She was also among 49 other African journalists that made up the voting panel of the maiden edition of the ‘Africa Football Shop Player of the Year Award’ She also won the year 2021 African Woman in Sport award at the GSport Awards At the 26th Ghana Journalists Awards, Juliet was named the Sports Journalist of the Year
