= Jerry Kuma =

Vice-Chancellor of University of Mines and Technology, Tarkwa

Jerry Samuel Yao-Kuma

Vice-chancellor of the University of Mines and Technology

Jerry Samuel Yao-Kuma is the vice-chancellor of the University of Mines and Technology located in Tarkwa.

== Early life and education ==
He was born in Dzolo-Kpuita located near Ho in the Volta Region of Ghana. He went to middle school at E.P. Middle School in Hohoe and Kpandu then proceeded to Mawuli School also located in Ho and Bishop Herman College, Kpandu. He is an alumnus of University of Ghana and University of Newcastle.

== Works ==
Prof. Kuma has published a research paper on small scale mining and it's dangers in Ghana and Africa with alternative methods that can be used. During his tenure in office, the University of Mines and Technology has entered a partnership with the Ghana National Small Scale Miners Association to offer training to its members in surveying, environmental care, geology and other mining related subjects and best practices. In March 2014, at "Sandvik Goes to School" programme, Prof. Kuma appealed to Sandvik Mining Ghana to support the university in training licensed small scale miners in Ghana.
