= Bishop Herman College =

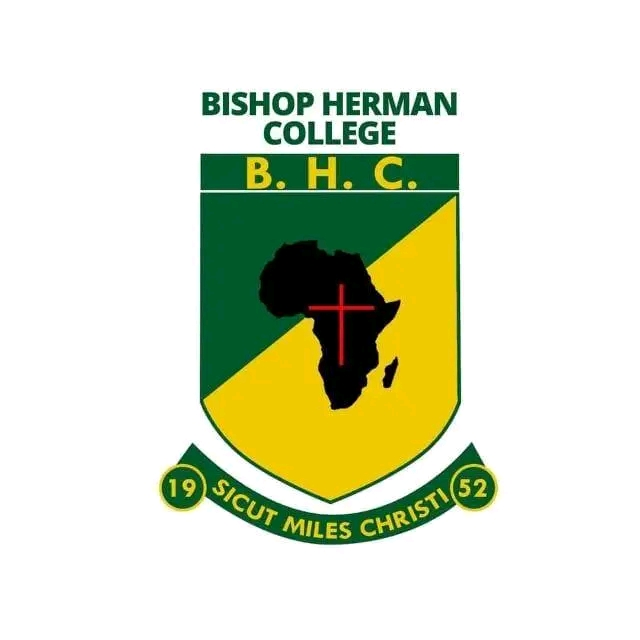
- The School Crest

Location
- P. O. Box 46 Kpando; Volta Region; Kpando, Aloryi; Ghana
- 7°00′21″N 0°17′08″E

Information
- Type: Boys' public Ghana Education Trust Fund high school
- Motto: Sicut Miles Christi (As Soldiers Of Christ)
- Religious affiliation: Christianity
- Denomination: Catholic
- Established: 1952 (74 years ago)
- Status: Boarding and day
- School district: Kpando
- Session: Morning
- Headmaster: Francis Dominic Kudolo
- Chaplain: Rev Fr Prosper Kwaku
- Gender: Boys
- Age range: 14–18+
- Education system: Boarding and Day
- Language: English, French, Latin
- Hours in school day: 10 hours
- Houses: 8
- Colours: Green and Yellow
- Slogan: The Hill Of knowledge
- Song: Come join with us to sing
- Fight song: I'm proud to be a Bihecan
- Sports: Basketball, soccer, athletics, handball, hockey, volleyball
- Nickname: BIHECO
- Rival: Mawuli School
- Accreditation: Ghana Education Service
- USNWR ranking: 12th
- National ranking: 17th
- School fees: Government
- Graduates: Bishop Herman Old Boys Union (BHOBU)
- Affiliation: Catholic Church, Ghana

Bishop Herman College, sometimes abbreviated to BIHECO, is a boys-only second-cycle institution located at Akpini Hills in Kpando in the Volta Region of Ghana by Dutch Catholic Priest founders on 28 February 1952. It is also considered one of three Category ‘A’ schools in the Volta and Oti Regions and also holds the distinction of being the first Catholic boys' secondary school founded by the Roman Catholic Church in the region. Since its inception, the College Bishop Herman College stands out for its competitiveness in both academic and extra-curricular activities particularly in the sciences. The school has been recognized as the best performing school in the Volta Region according to WAEC rankings. The nickname for the college is BIHECO, and the students are called BIHECANS and alumni are called BHOBU (Bishop Herman Old Boys Union).

== History ==
Bishop Herman College was the first Catholic boys secondary school established by the Roman Catholic Church in the Volta Region of Ghana which became a product of Catholic Missionary activities in the Kpando making it the first of second cycle schools established by the Catholic Church to serve as a nursery ground to prepare the products of the numerous Catholic elementary schools in the area who desired higher education and for others who aspired for vocations in the priesthood

The college was founded by Dutch missionaries under the administration of the archdiocese of Ho and notable amongst them are Bishop Gerald Holland, Rev. Fr. John Beckers, Fr. John Myers Cough and Rev. Fr. Gerard Hombergen where Bishop Anthony Konings (formerly Rev. Fr. Konings) took the lead in the establishment of the college through fundraising, planning and takiff of the College on 28 February 1952 with Rev. Fr. Cornelius Leonardo Priems serving as its first headmaster, Rev. Fr. James Caffery (Asst. Headmaster) and Mr. Conrad Etu-Mantey where these three came together and taught all subjects in those days. Some of the initial subjects were Latin, History, Christian Religion, English Language, among others. Later, teachers from countries such as Britain, France, India, Holland joined them which at the time made the College a citadel of expatriate staff.

Bishop Anthony Konings and other Dutch founding fathers of the College name i it after the late Bishop Augustine Herman, a French national and priest, as a posthumous honor in his memory for his untiring missionary work from 1923 till his demise in 1945 in the then Keta Diocese which spanned two colonial territories of Gold Coast and Togoland under British and German controls respectively laid the foundation of the church.

The College which started with 26 students, who were recruited through a competitive entrance examination and sound moral considerations, from a humble beginning in the old R.C. Misson House at Kpando Tsakpe as a boys' institution as a boarding or residential institution but later on 18 July 1954, Rev Fr. Brockoff and Van Gastel completed the 'Giant block' which is the foundation block of the College.

The college was absorbed into the educational mainstream as a Government Assisted College in Ghana in the year 1955 during which it presented its first batch of 17 students for the School Certificate (General Certificate of Education Examination) (SC/GCE) and in the year of Ghana's Independence, the Boarding House was moved to the current and permanent location of the college, Kpando Aloy. The College undertook its first Six Form Examination in 1962.

Based on statistics of the college as at the beginning of the 2025/2026 academic year, the College’s enrolment exceeds 3,500 students with over 140 teaching staff and 45 non-teaching staff.

The college over the years have marked the establishment of the college through celebrations. On 13 November 1977, the College marked its Silver Jubilee Celebration, and in 1992, the College celebrated its 40th anniversary. Also, 27 July 2002 climaxed the Golden Jubilee celebration of the College.

== School code ==
The Ghana Education Service has assigned the code 0070601 for administrative purposes, including student registrations, placements, and national examinations such as the West African Senior School Certificate Examination (WASSCE) to Bishop Herman College.

== School motto ==
The official motto of Bishop Herman College is Sicut Miles Christ translated as "As Soldiers of Christ in English.i This was the personal motto of the late Bishop Augustine Herm in adopted from the words of Paul in 2 Tim. 2:1-10 in defense of the principles and teachings of our Lord Jesus Christ, whose unrepentant Apostle he later became.

Since the establishment of this college, every student who passes through the it is taught to live by the motto: to eschew all forms of vice and cultivate the virtues of fortitude, endurance, diligence self-discipline, reliability, honesty and the likes as demonstrated by Jesus Christ himself.

== Academic programs ==
Bishop Herman College functions within the standard three-year Senior High School (SHS) curriculum framework established by Ghana's National Council for Curriculum and Assessment (NaCCA). Currently, BIHECO runs five approved programmes which include the following;

- Agriculture
- Business
- General Arts
- General Science
- Visual Arts

== Facilities ==
Biheco has the following facilities;

- Science Laboratories
- Library
- Dining Hall
- Dormitories (Boys)
- Agricultural laboratory
- Visual arts studio
- ICT/computer laboratory
- Kitchen
- Sport Fields

== Houses ==
The college has eight (8) houses named after Catholic Saints and Old Boys of the college.

1. St. Augustine's House (House 1), the oldest house, named after Augustine of Hippo.
2. St. Benedict's House (House 2).
3. St. Cyprians' House (House 3)
4. Etu-Mantey's house (House 4).
5. St. Maurice's House (House 5)
6. St. Victor's House (House 6)
7. Bishop Lodonu's House (House 7), named after an alumnus, emeritus Bishop Francis Anane K. Lodonu
8. Monseigneur Eleezar's House (House 8), the latest house, is named after Father 'Amakpa', one of the school's longest-serving headmasters.

== Heads of the School ==
Several Headmasters have led BIHECO. The list below highlights them;

- Mr. Francis Dominic Kudolo (2019 - Date)
- Mr Mathias Setornyo Attimah (2015 - 2019)
- Rev. Fr. Walter Mawusi Agbetoh (2008 - 2015)
- Mr T.K. Dzavor (1998 - 2008)
- Mr Pius Serracou (Acting) (1997 - 1998)
- Rev. Fr Justine Danso (1991 - 1996)
- Rev. Msgr. Joachim Eleezer (1975 - 1991)
- Rev. Fr. Cornelius Leonardo Priems (1952 - 1975)

== Notable alumni ==
- Alfred Agbesi Woyome, businessman and leading member of the National Democratic Congress (Ghana)
- Jerry Kuma, vice chancellor of the University of Mines and Technology
- Giovani Caleb, television and radio personality
- Larry Gbevlo-Lartey, retired military personnel with the Ghana Armed Forces, former National Security Coordinator of Ghana and private legal practitioner
- Fiifi Kwetey, general secretary of the National Democratic Congress (Ghana) and former member of parliament
- Edmond Kofi Agbenutse Deh, diplomat and civil servant
- Francis Lodonu, catholic bishop
- Anthony Hugh Selormey, soldier, politician, and member of the National Redemption Council (NRC)
- Edem (rapper), rapper
- Camidoh, afrobeats singer
- Hon. Frank Annoh Dompreh, member of parliament
- Hon. Kofi Adams, member of parliament
- Hon. Prosper Douglas Bani, Former Chief of Staff of Ghana and former Interior Minister

== See also ==
- Education in Ghana
- List of schools in Ghana
