= Selase Agbenyefia =

Ghanaian pilot (born 1978)

Selase Yaaya Agbenyefia
- Born: 1978 (age 47–48); Ho, Volta Region
- Allegiance: Ghana
- Branch: Ghana Air Force
- Service years: 1998—present
- Rank: Group Captain

Selase Agbenyefia or Selase Yaaya Agbenyefia (born 1978) is an officer in the Ghana Air Force and she became the first Ghanaian female helicopter pilot.

== Life ==
Agbenyefia was born in 1978 and 1989 she started at Mawuko Girls Secondary School. Two years later she was at Mawuli Secondary School. She took a BSc in Business Administration at the University of Ghana, graduating in 2009. Agbenyefia also holds a Postgraduate Certificate in Public Administration from the Ghana Institute of Management and Public Administration.

Agbenyefia had gained the unusual ambition of becoming a pilot. She applied to join the air force but when she turned up with the other recruits she found that she had been assigned to the army. She challenged this with Major General Joseph Narh Adinkra and she was told that the air force did not take women. She challenged this and her tenacity was rewarded when she was sent away with other prospective pilots for training.

The prospective candidates were reduced to 20 and then to 15 when they were based at the Ghana Military Academy at Teshie in Accra. Her first flight was in an Aero L-29 Delfín Jet Trainer which she first flew with Air Commodore Philip Ayisa in September 1998. There had been women pilots before in Ghana but the two who did fly retired after the 1966 coup in Ghana, so she was the first for 35 years, it is said that she is the first woman pilot of military helicopters in West Africa for 48 years.

In 2015 she was credited with saving President John Mahama's life when she made an unscheduled landing.

== Flight Experience ==
- Rating: Command Pilot
- Flight hours: more than 1800
- Aircraft: Aero L-29 Delfín, AgustaWestland AW109, Bell 412 and Mil Mi-17.

== Awards ==
Year	Nominee/Work	Awards	Result
2017	Herself	Ghana's First Female Helicopter Pilot	Won
