= Mawuli School =

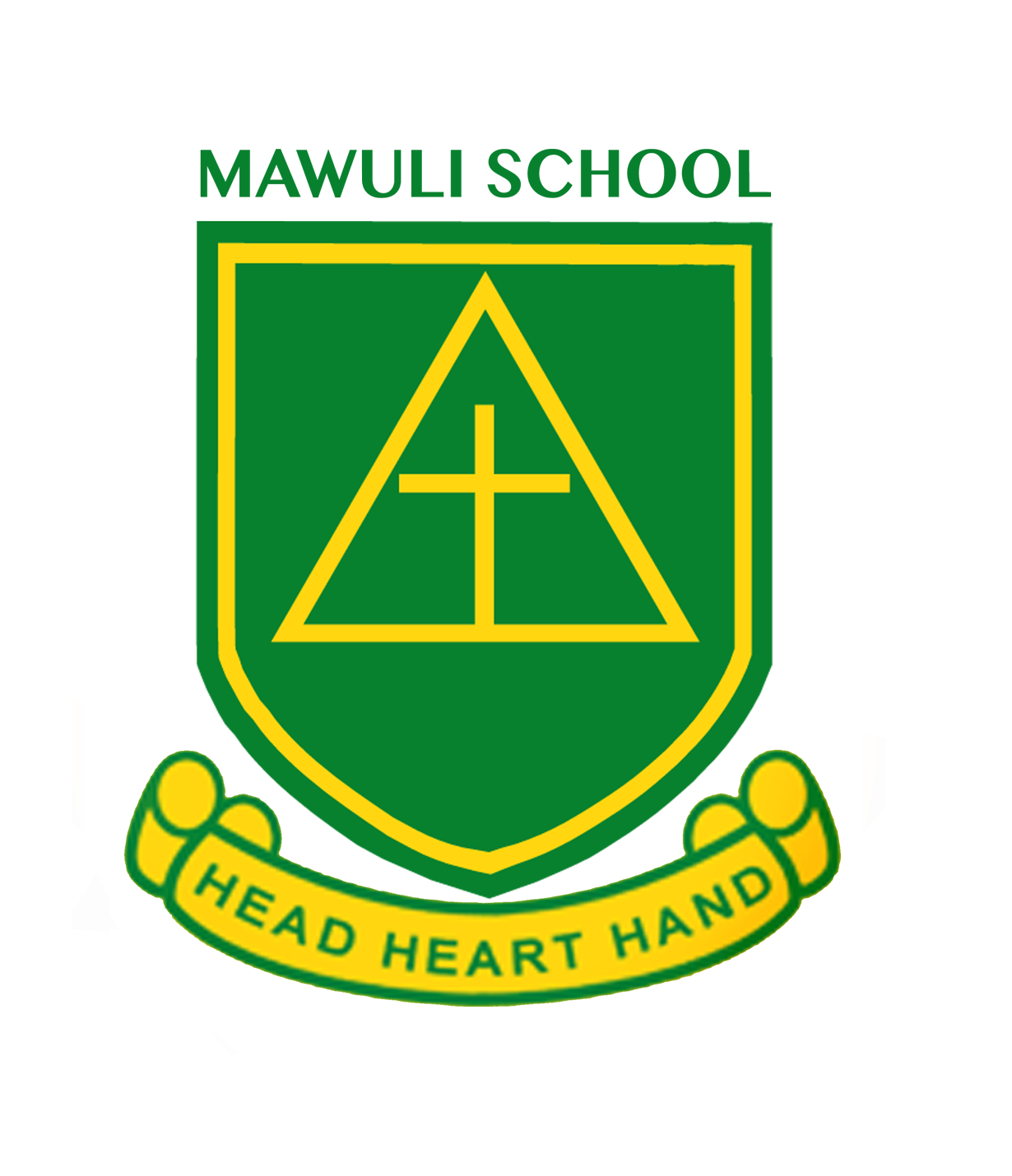

Location
- P. O. Box MA45; Ho, Volta Region; Ghana; 6.5977°N 0.4755°E

Information
- Type: Public Boarding School
- Motto: Head, Heart and Hand
- Religious affiliation: Christian
- Denomination: Evangelical Presbyterian Church
- Established: August 1950 (76 years ago)
- Founder: Rev. Trost
- Status: Active
- School board: Board of Governors
- School district: Ho Municipal
- Oversight: Ghana Education Service
- Head teacher: Mr. Benjamin Yawo Dei
- Staff: 68
- Grades: Forms 1–3 (10th – 12th grades)
- Gender: Co-educational
- Age range: 14 to 18 years
- Education system: Senior high school
- Campus type: Residential
- Houses: 10
- Colours: Green and yellow
- Slogan: Haviwo
- Rival: Bishop Herman College
- Alumni: Old Mawulian Association (OMSU) (members are called OMSU)
- Website: Mawuli School

Mawuli School is a co-educational, boarding senior high school located in Ho in the Ho Municipal district in the Volta Region of Ghana.

== History ==
The school was founded in 1950 by the Evangelical Presbyterian Church. It was the first senior high school to be established in the former British mandate territory of Trans-Volta Togoland.

The name "Mawuli" is a popular Ewe name in the Volta Region, and means "There is a God". The name and school motto "Head Heart Hand", were submitted by students.

== Programmes offered ==
- Business
- General arts
- General science
- Home economics
- Technical skills (Auto Mechanics and Applied Electricity)
- Visual arts
- Graphics
- Ceramics
- General Agriculture

== Notable alumni ==
- Eric Edem Agbana - Ghanaian politician and Member of Parliament (MP) for Ketu North constituency
- Selase Agbenyefia – Ghanaian helicopter pilot
- Nelson Agbesi – Volta Regional Minister (1979–1980), Minister for Agriculture (1980–1981)
- Samuel Koku Anyidoho – Deputy General-Secretary of the National Democratic Congress (2014–2018)
- Akofa Edjeani Asiedu – Ghanaian actress
- Oscar Korbla Mawuli Awuku – Ghanaian body artist, painter, and sculptor
- Rockson-Nelson Dafeamekpor – Ghanaian politician and the Member of Parliament for South Dayi constituency
- Akua Sena Dansua – Ghanaian journalist and politician
- Leila Djansi – Ghanaian filmmaker
- Harry Dumashie - Chief of the Defence Staff, Chief of Air Staff and member of the Provisional National Defence Council
- Smile Dzisi – rector and interim vice-chancellor of the Koforidua Technical University
- Va-Bene Elikem Fiatsi – Ghanaian multidisciplinary artist, curator and philanthropist, founder and artistic director of perfocraZe International Artists Residency (pIAR)
- Ernest Gaewu – Justice of the Supreme Court of Ghana
- Bernice Heloo – MP Hohoe North and former deputy Minister for Environment Science, Technology and Innovations
- Jerry Kuma – vice-chancellor of the University of Mines and Technology
- Efo Kodjo Mawugbe – Ghanaian award-winning playwright and former director of the National Theatre of Ghana
- Elizabeth Akua Ohene – Ghanaian journalist

== Gallery of School ==
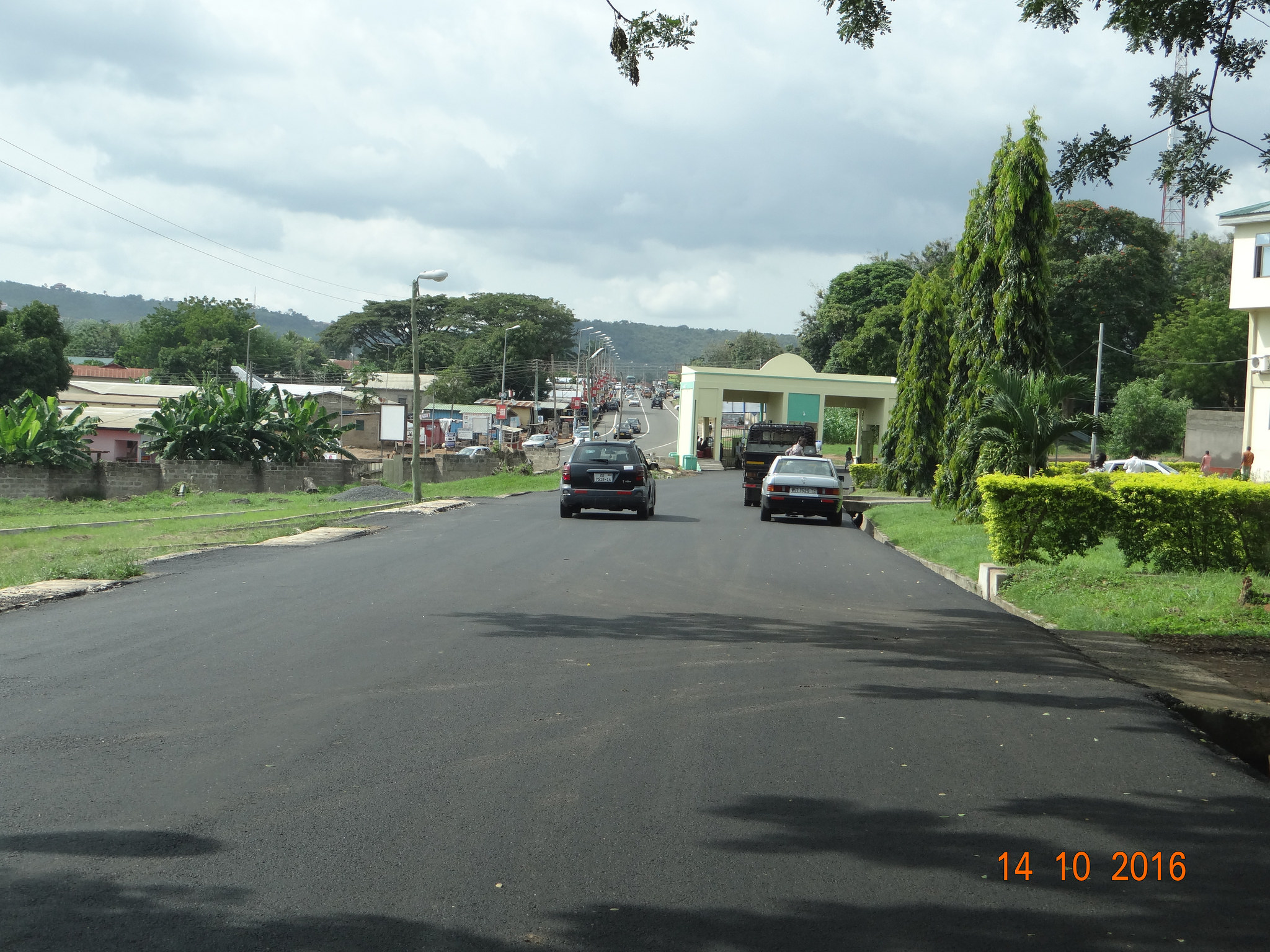
Main Entrance

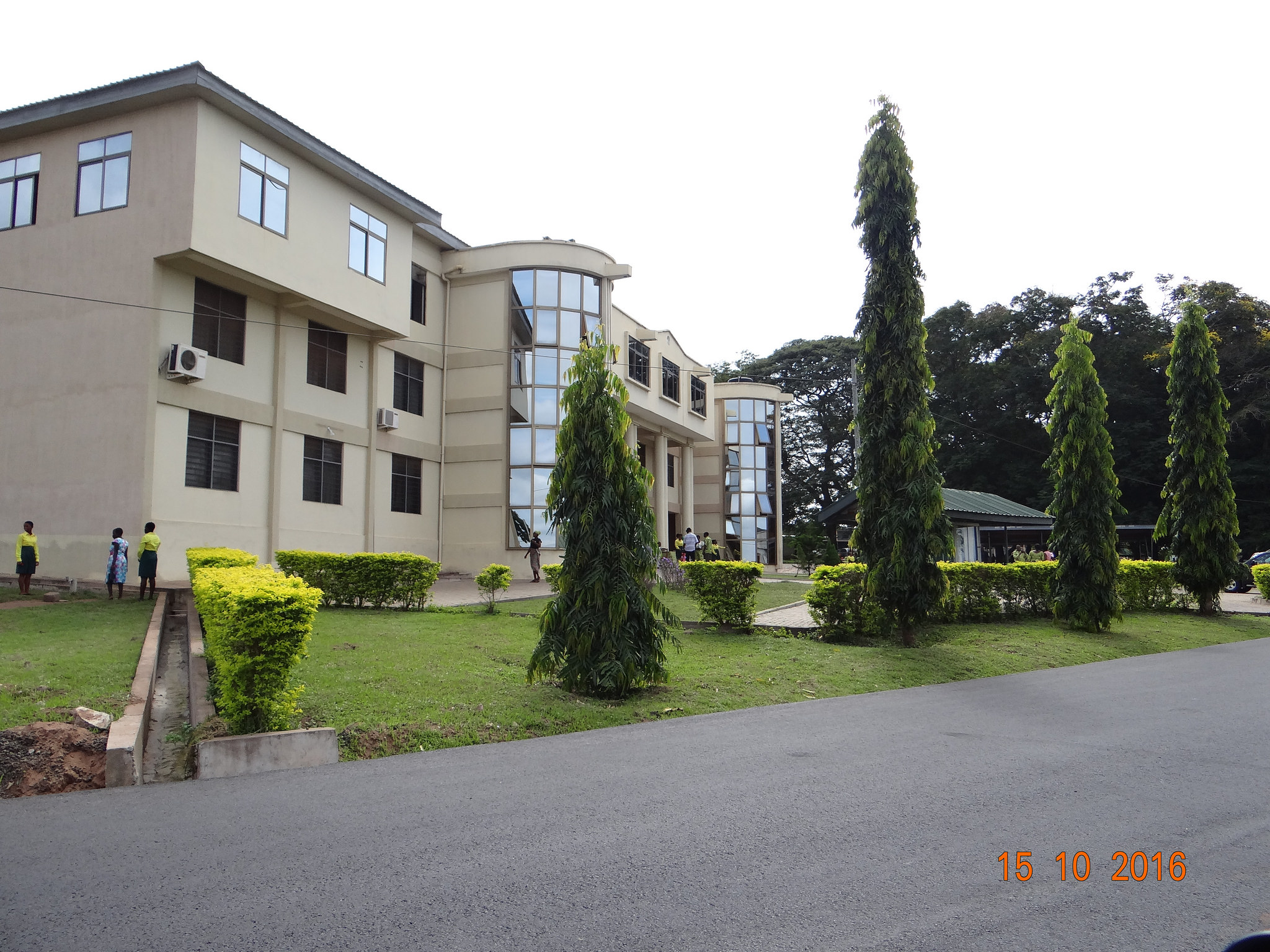
Administration Block

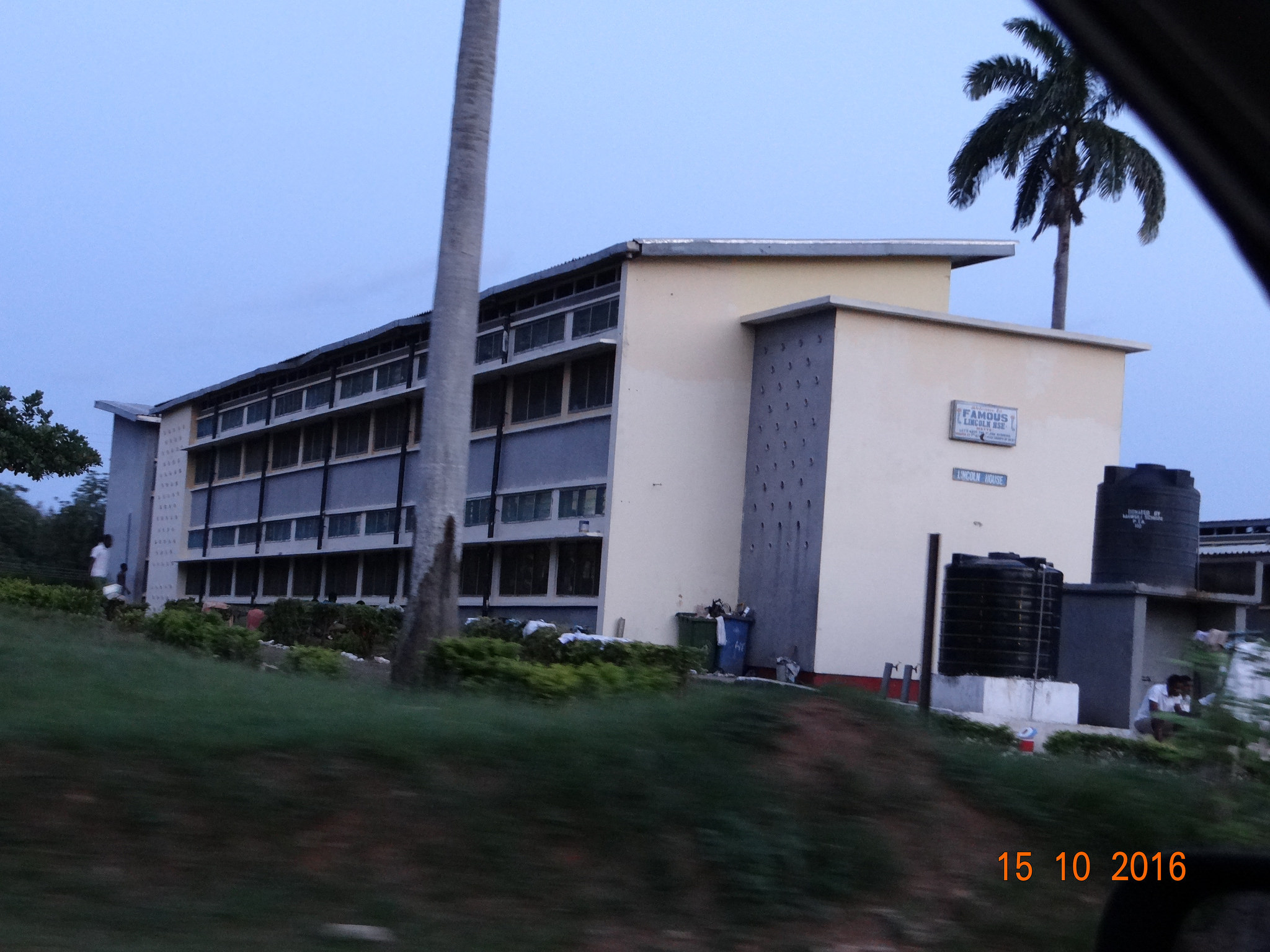
Lincoln House

== See also ==
- Education in Ghana
- List of senior high schools in Ghana
