= Victoria Michaels =

Ghanaian-Nigerian actress and model

- Born: Victoria Michaels; Accra, Ghana
- Education: Bachelor of Science Degree from the Central University College, Business Management and Communication at Ghana Institute of Journalism in Ghana
- Occupations: Actress, model, fashion icon, philanthropist
- Years active: 2013-present

Victoria Michaels is a Ghanaian-Nigerian model, fashion icon, actress, brand ambassador and philanthropist. She is the recipient of several accolades, including Ghana Models Awards, Glitz Style Awards, and the City People Entertainment Awards.

== Early life and education ==
Victoria was born in Accra to Nigerian father and Nigerian-Ghanaian mother. She is the fifth child out of the six children in their family. She had her primary education at Anglican Girls Grammar School, Delta State, Nigeria and joined Mawuko Girls Senior High School for her secondary education. She pursued Business Management and Communication at Ghana Institute of Journalism earned a Diploma in Mass Communication. She holds a Bachelor of Science Degree from Central University College.

== Career ==
Victoria had her first stint at modeling at the age of 19 but couldn't pursue it because of her education. She actively started modeling in 2013 after she got her first degree. She has since featured in major publications including Canoe Magazine, Roots Paris, Destiny Connect, True Love magazine, Bona Magazine, Canoe Magazine, Vogue Italia, OkayAfrica Magazine, Elle South Africa, O Yes! and Glam Africa Magazine.

She has modeled for BBC Fashion Show, Dubai Fashion Show, Africa Fashion Week London, African Fashion International Johannesburg, Men's Health Fashion Week, South Africa Fashion Week, Accra Fashion Week, FIMA International Fashion Show, Mercedes Benz African fashion festival, and Dark & Lovely Fashion Show. She has appeared in commercials as brand ambassador for Melcom Ghana, Leasafric Ghana Limited and Hertz Franchise.

== Charity ==
Victoria owns a charitable foundation which she established in 2013. She established the Victoria Michaels Foundation, a charity organization which helps improve the lives of underprivileged children through the Africa Literacy Development Initiative (ALDI) project in Education, Women/Girl child Empowerment and Youth Empowerment within Africa.

== Awards and nominations ==
- 2018 - Model of the year - Glitz Africa Awards
- 2018 - Classic Model of the year- Accra Fashion Week.
- 2017 - Fashion Personality Of The Year - Eagles Summit
- 2017 - Inspiring Personality of the Year Award - Ghana Nigeria Achievers Awards
- 2017 - Distinguished Eminent Model Award - GIJ Eminence Awards
- 2017 -Angel of Hope Award for Humanitarian Activities - Ovation Magazine
- 2017- Honoree for Contribution to Fashion home and abroad and role in women and children empowerment- Africa Fashion Week Toronto
- 2016- Commercial model (FEMALE) of the Year- AFROMA Awards
- 2016 - Best New Actress of the Year – City People Entertainment Awards.
- 2016 - Model of the year - Glitz Africa Awards.
- 2016 - Model of the Year - Ghana Models Awards
- 2016 - Humanitarian Personality Award - UMB Ghana Tertiary Awards
