= Larry Gbevlo-Lartey =

Ghanaian military officer

Larry Gbevlo-Lartey is a retired Ghanaian military officer who worked in the Ghana Armed Forces, former National Security Coordinator of Ghana, a private legal practitioner, and currently the African Union Chairperson's Special Representative in Charge of Counter Terrorism Cooperation.

== Early life ==
Lieutenant Colonel Larry Gbevlo-Lartey (rtd) was born in Ghana on 3 June 1953. He attended Bishop Herman College from 1967 to 1974. He enlisted in the Ghana Military Academy as a regular infantry officer cadet in November 1976 and graduated as 2nd Lieutenant in April 1978. Larry Gbevlo-Lartey obtained a Bachelor of Science degree in Administration from the University of Ghana, Legon 1984 - 1987. Larry Gbevlo Lartey (rtd) is a solicitor and barrister at law, Ghana School of Law from 1995 to 1999. He is also a holder of Master of Arts degree in International Affairs and Diplomacy from the Legon Centre for International Affairs and Diplomacy (LECIAD) in the University of Ghana.

During his military service, Larry Gbevlo-Lartey pursued the prescribed Infantry career professional courses in the Ghana Army as well as other professional courses in India, UK, USA and Cuba. In India, he did the Commando training course and in Cuba, the Special Forces training course. In the USA he did the Infantry Officers Advanced Course. His last command appointment in the Ghana Army was Commander of the 64 Infantry Regiment. At the time of retirement from the Ghana Army, he was a Directing Staff at the Ghana Armed Forces Senior Command and Staff College.

Larry Gbevlo-Lartey during his time of Military service participated in a number of peacekeeping missions including the United Nations Interim force in Lebanon UNIFIL; the United Nations Peacekeeping Force in Croatia and in Bosnia and Herzegovina (UNPROFOR) and United Nations Organization Mission in the Democratic Republic of Congo MONUC. After retirement from the Ghana Army, he served as the Coordinator of the UN Observer Team to the Cameroon-Nigeria Mixed Commission which under the auspices of UNOWAS was tasked to observe the peaceful delimitation of the Cameroon-Nigeria border in line with the decision of the International Court of Justice. He was the director of programs at the Center for Conflict Resolution in Accra Ghana, from November 2007 until January 2009 when he was appointed National Security Coordinator for Ghana.

== Positions in government ==
On 16 January 2009, the then President of the Republic of Ghana John Evans Atta Mills appointed him as the National Security Coordinator for the Republic of Ghana. A position he held until May 2014. On 21 January 2025, the President appointed Gbevlo-Lartey as the special envoy to the alliance of Sahelian states.

== Recent activities ==
He assumed the position of chief executive officer for a Ghanaian telecommunication company, Kasapa Telecom Ltd (Expresso) in November 2014. In addition to being a Private Legal Practitioner, Larry Gbevlo-Lartey has for many years been a researcher with interests in Human Security. He established the Human Security Research Center in Accra Ghana. He is a visiting lecturer at the Kofi Annan International Peace Keeping Training Centre in Accra, Ghana.

On 18 March 2016, he was appointed by H.E Dr Nkosazana Dlamini Zuma, the then Chairperson of the African Union Commission as her Special Representative in charge of Counter Terrorism Cooperation and concurrently as the director of the African Center for the Study and Research on Terrorism (ACSRT) in Algeria. He is highly knowledgeable in Human Security, National Security and International Security.
