= Alfred Agbesi Woyome =

Ghanaian businessman (born 1965)

Alfred Woyome
- Born: Alfred Agbesi Woyome; January 22, 1965; Dabala, Ghana
- Occupation: Businessman
- Political party: National Democratic Congress

Alfred Agbesi Woyome (born January 22, 1965) is a Ghanaian businessman and a former Honorary Vice Consul of Austria to Ghana and a leading member of the National Democratic Congress. He is best known for the Woyomegate scandal.

== Education ==
Woyome is an alumnus of Bishop Herman College in Kpando in the Volta Region of Ghana where he had his secondary education.

== Woyomegate scandal ==
In 2009, Mr. Woyome received an illegal judgment debt payment of GH¢51.2 million from the government of Ghana for his purported role in securing funds for the construction of stadia for the 2008 Africa Cup of Nations (CAN 2008). Initially, Woyome claimed compensation due to an alleged breach of contract by the then Kufuor administration; however, the payment was later sanctioned under President John Atta Mills. The scandal escalated when former Attorney General Martin Amidu challenged the payment's legality, leading to a Supreme Court ruling in 2014 that declared the payment unconstitutional, ordering Woyome to refund the money. Despite this, recovery efforts have been mired in legal battles, with Woyome attempting international arbitration and facing numerous property seizures.

== See also ==
- Martin Amidu
- Betty Mould-Iddrisu
