= Ghana's Most Beautiful =

Beauty pageant

- Formation: 2007; 19 years ago
- Type: Beauty pageant
- Headquarters: Accra
- Location: Ghana
- Official language: English

TV3 Ghana

Ghana's Most Beautiful is a beauty pageant TV program that educate Ghanaians and the global community about the various cultural values and heritage in the sixteen(16) regions of Ghana. The program is organized by TV3 and its media partners. The aim of the pageant program is to promote development through culture and unity.

== Awards ==
The list of awards given to winners of the beauty pageant.

| Winners | Year | Region | Ref. |
|---|---|---|---|
| Nana Konadu | 2026 | Bono Region | |
| Etornam | 2025 | Volta Region | |
| Titiaka | 2024 | Savannah Region | |
| Selorm | 2023 | Volta Region | |
| Teiya | 2022 | Northern Region | |
| Safoa | 2021 | Ashanti Region | |
| Naa | 2020 | Greater Accra Region | |
| Ekua | 2019 | Central Region | |
| Abena | 2018 | Eastern Region | |
| Zeinab | 2017 | Northern Region | |
| Yaaba | 2016 | Western Region | |
| Esi | 2015 | Central Region | |
| Baciara | 2014 | Upper West Region | |
| Poka | 2013 | Upper East Region | |
| Emefa | 2012 | Volta Region | |
| Akua | 2011 | Ashanti Region | |
| Nana Ama | 2010 | Eastern Region | |
| Nasara | 2009 | Northern Region | |
| Adoley | 2008 | Greater Accra | |
| Ama | 2007 | Central Region | |

=== Region rankings ===
| Region | Title | Year |
|---|---|---|
| Central Region | 3 | 2007, 2015, 2019 |
| Northern Region | 3 | 2009, 2017, 2022 |
| Volta Region | 3 | 2012, 2023, 2025 |
| Ashanti Region | 2 | 2011, 2021 |
| Eastern Region | 2 | 2010, 2018 |
| Greater Accra Region | 2 | 2008, 2020 |
| Upper East Region | 1 | 2013 |
| Upper West Region | 1 | 2014 |
| Western Region | 1 | 2016 |
| Savannah Region | 1 | 2024 |
| Bono Region | 1 | 2026 |
