= Koforidua Technical University =

University in Ghana

- Coat of Arms of Koforidua Technical University
- Other name: KTU
- Former name: Koforidua Polytechnic
- Motto: Innovating for Development
- Type: Technical university
- Established: 1997; 29 years ago
- President: Victor Togoh
- Vice-president: Kwesi Manful
- Vice-Chancellor: David Kofi Essumang
- Students: Over 8000
- Location: Koforidua, Eastern Region, Ghana; 6.0646°N 0.2630°W
- Campus: Main campus
- Colours: Blue, white
- Website: www.ktu.edu.gh

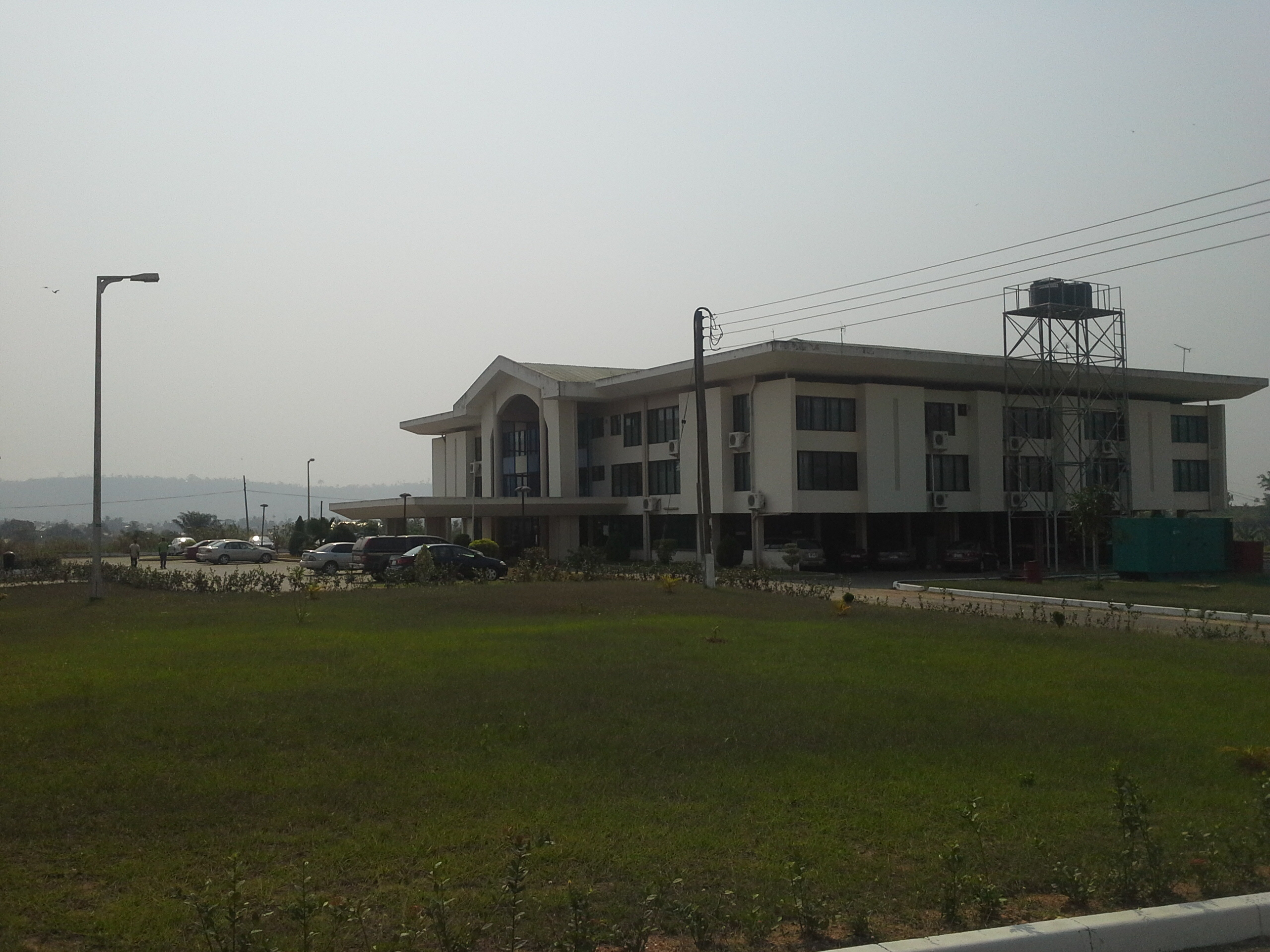
Administration block

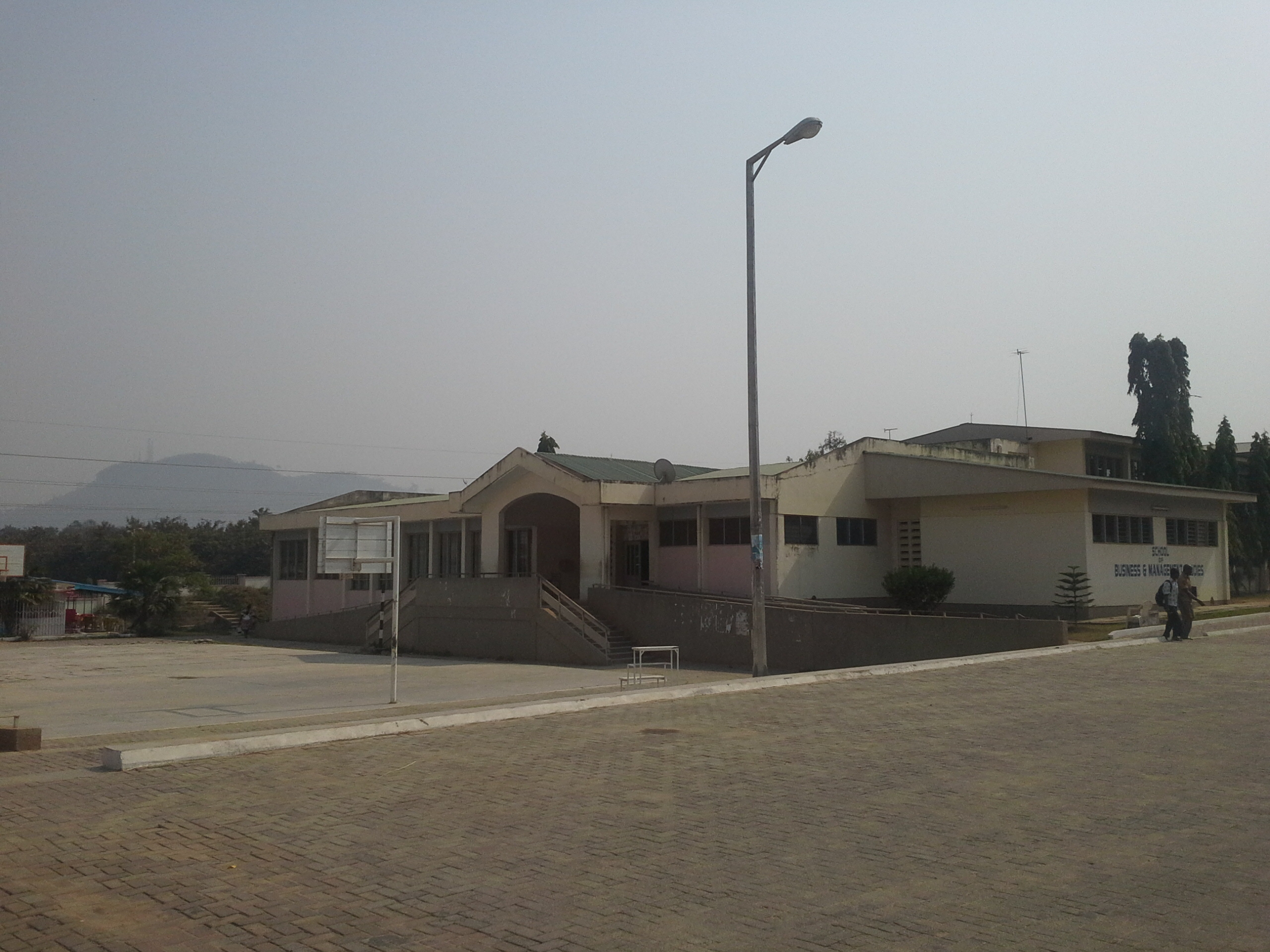
S.B.M.S. block

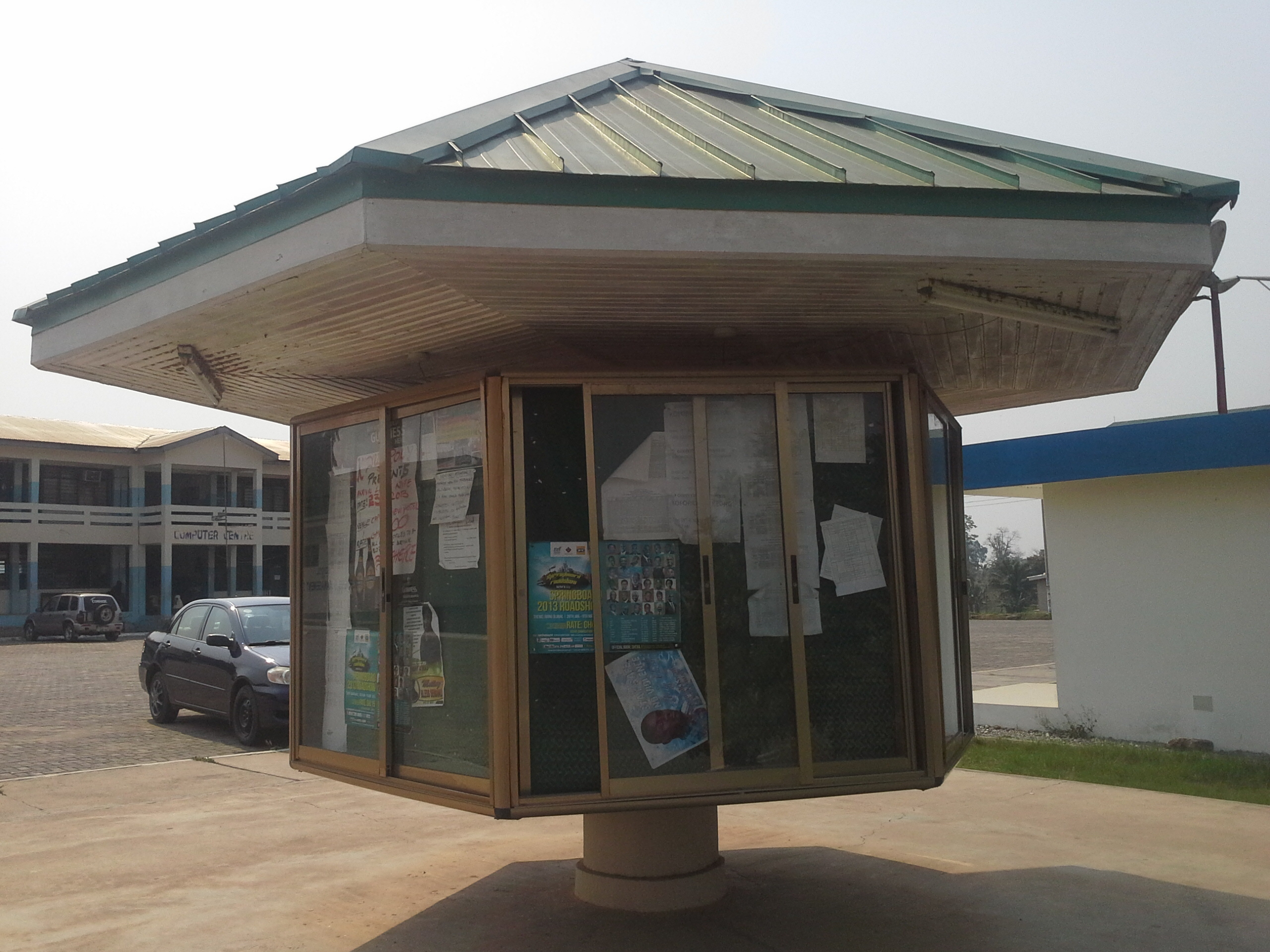
General notice board

Established in 1997, Koforidua Technical University is one of Ghana's ten regional Technical Universities. Since 1999 it has produced graduates with HNDs in accountancy (secretaryship and management studies), marketing, purchasing and supply, statistics, and computer science. It currently offers degree programmes.

== History ==
In 1997, the university began with a "solo block" structure and a small number of students. It has since expanded in terms of student population, programs, faculties, and infrastructure development. The university now has five faculties and one institute, with approximately 8,000 students. The institution has five faculties and one institute: the Faculty of Business and Management Studies, the Faculty of Applied Sciences and Technology, the Faculty of Engineering, the Faculty of Built and Natural Environment, the Faculty of Health and Allied Sciences, and the Institute of Open and Distance Learning. Since its establishment, its number of HND programs has increased from two to 14. Six of the programs are offered by the School of Business and Management Studies, six from the Faculty of Engineering and four from the School of Applied Science and Technology.

To fulfill its 2010–2014 strategic plans, the school now offers Bachelor of Technology programs for only two courses—procurement and Automotive Engineering. Other courses are looking to be added. Koforidua Technical University has the support of a number of institutions, including the Ministry of Education and its agencies, National Council for Tertiary Education, National Accreditation Board, National Board for Professional and Technician Examinations, the Ghana Education Trust Fund, and the Council for Technical and Vocational Education and Training.

As of the 2018–19 academic year, Koforidua Technical University offers the below undergraduate courses.

== Faculty of Business and Management Studies ==
- Department of Accountancy
  - Bachelor of Technology Accounting
  - HND Accounting
- Department of Purchasing & Supply
  - Bachelor of Technology Procurement & Supply Chain Management
  - HND Purchasing & Supply
- Department of Marketing
  - Bachelor of Technology Marketing
  - HND Marketing
- Department of Secretaryship & Management Studies
  - Bachelor of Technology Secretaryship & Management Studies
  - HND Secretaryship & Management Studies
- Department of Professional Studies

The department runs Diploma in Business Studies (DBS) with various options:

- DBS Statistics
- DBS Information Technology (IT)
- DBS Entrepreneurship
- DBS Accounting
- DBS Purchasing & Supply
- DBS Banking & Finance
- DBS Marketing
- DBS Secretarial
- Department of Liberal Studies

== Faculty of Applied Science and Technology ==
- Bachelor of Technology (B.Tech.)
- HND Statistics
- HND Computer Science
- HND Network Management
- HND Hospitality Management
- HND Food Technology (morning only)
- HND Postharvest Technology (morning only)
- HND Fashion Design and Textiles
- BTECH Graphic Design Technology
- BTECH Fashion Design and Textiles

== Faculty of Engineering ==
- B.Tech. Automotive Engineering
- B.Tech. Civil Engineering
- B.Tech. Mechatronics Engineering
- B.Tech. Telecommunication Engineering
- B.Tech. Renewable Energy Systems Engineering
- B.Tech Mechanical Engineering Technology
- HND Environmental Management Technology
- HND Automotive Engineering
- HND Mechanical Engineering
- HND Renewable Energy Systems Engineering
- HND Electrical/Electronic Engineering
- HND Civil Engineering
- Construction Technician Course I, II, and III
- Electrical Engineering Technician I, II, and III
- Motor Vehicle Technician I, II, and III
- Mechanical Engineering Technician I, II, and III

== Faculty of Built and Natural Environment ==
The aspects of engineering and social sciences, built environment, or built world, directly point to the human-made environment that provides the setting for human activity, commencing in scale from buildings to cities. It refers to "the human-made space in which people live, work and recreate on a day-to-day basis."

The sciences of the built environment cover architecture, urbanism, building technology, civil engineering, landscaping and the management of built stock mutations and operations. The built environment comprehends places and spaces enacted or amended by people to serve their needs of accommodation, organisation and representation. Below are its related courses:

- B.Tech. Building Technology
- HND Building Technology
- HND Environmental Management Technology

== Faculty of Health and Allied Sciences ==
- HND Statistics
- HND Hospitality Management
- HND Computer Science
- HND Network Management
- Cookery 812/1 & 2
- Food and Beverage Service
- Fashion and Designing
- CISCO

== Faculty of Engineering ==
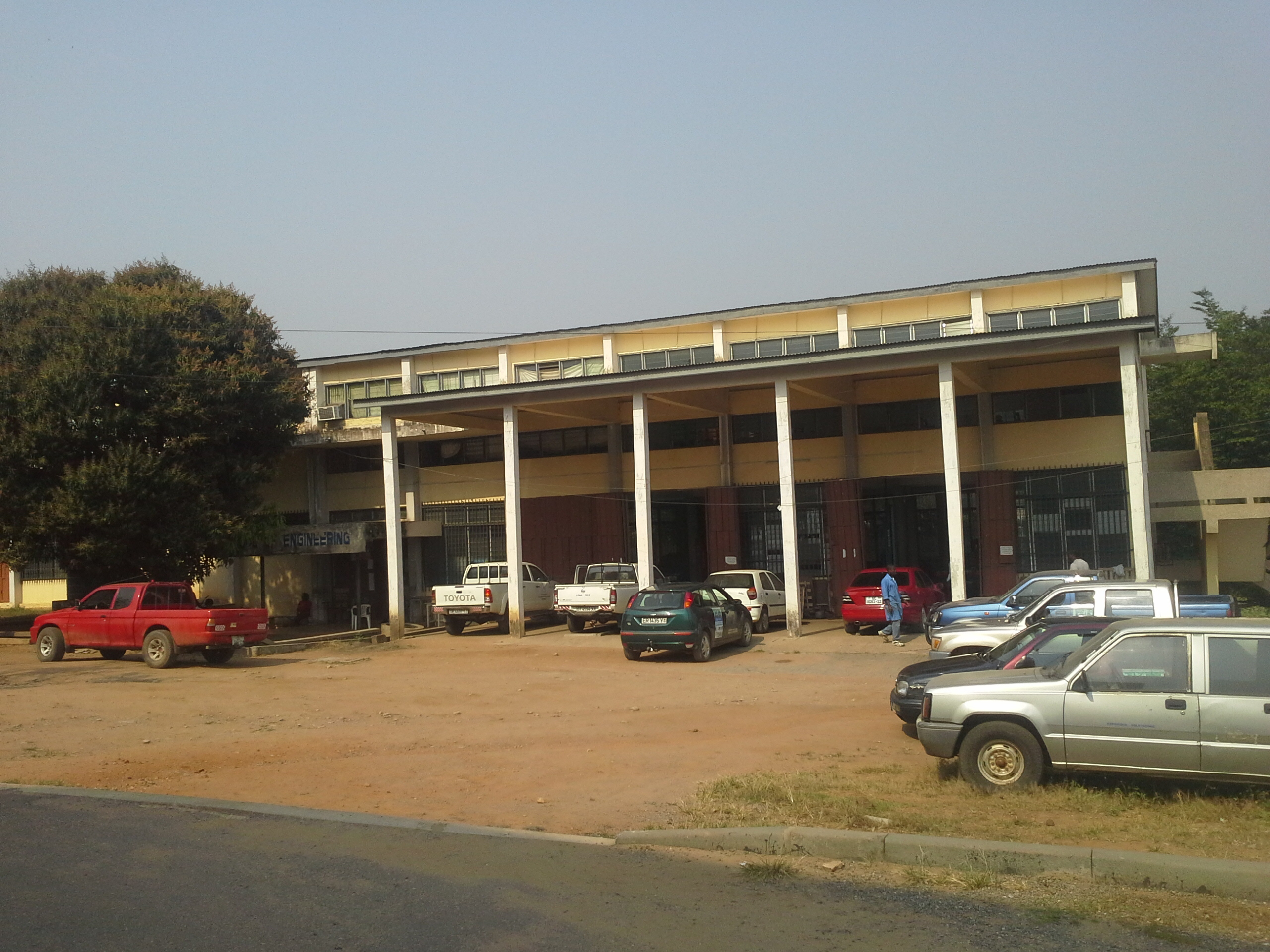
Engineering block

Dean: John Bonney (PhD. (London), MSc. (Kumasi), BSc. (Kumasi)

| Department | Head of department |
|---|---|
| Electrical/Electronic Engineering | Patrick Agbemabiese |
| Civil Engineering | Clement Nyamekye |
| Renewable Energy Systems Engineering | Emmanuel Okoh Agyemang |
| Automotive Engineering | Gabriel Osei |
| Mechanical Engineering | Dr . Fehrs Adu -Gyamfi |

=== Non-HND programmes ===
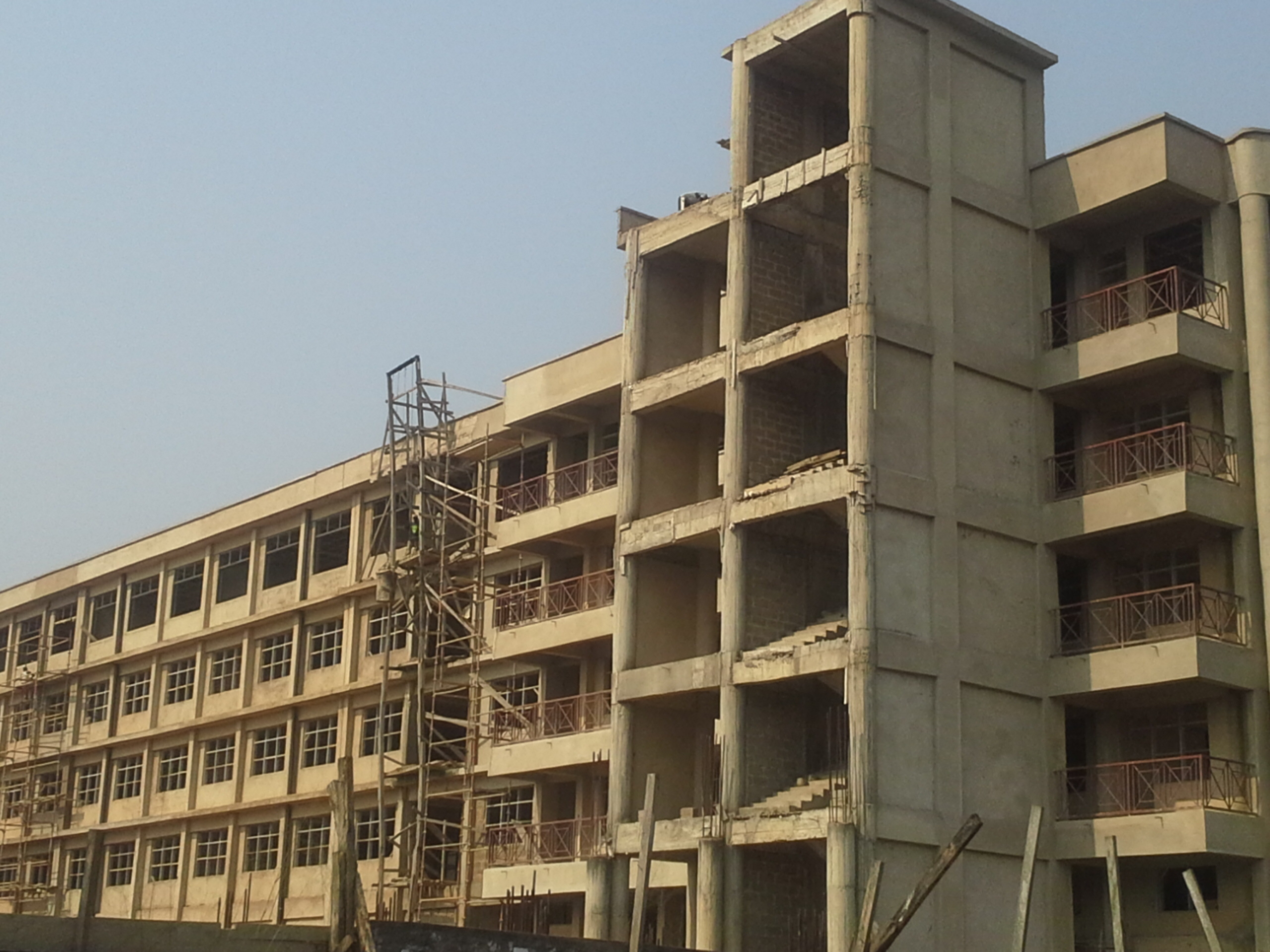
Six-storey engineering block under construction

- CTC I, II & III
- EET I, II & III
- MVT I, II & III
- MET I, II, III
- Pre HND OR Access Course

== School of Applied Science and Technology ==
Dean: Seth Okyere Darko (PhD (China), MSc. (Kumasi), Bsc (Kumasi), GSA

| Department | Head of department |
|---|---|
| Applied Mathematics | Reuben Semevoh |
| Computer Science | Patricia Ghann |
| Post-Harvest/Food Technology | William Odoom |
| Fashion Design and Textiles | Joseph Osei |
| Hospitality | Gladys Siaw |

=== Non-HND programmes ===
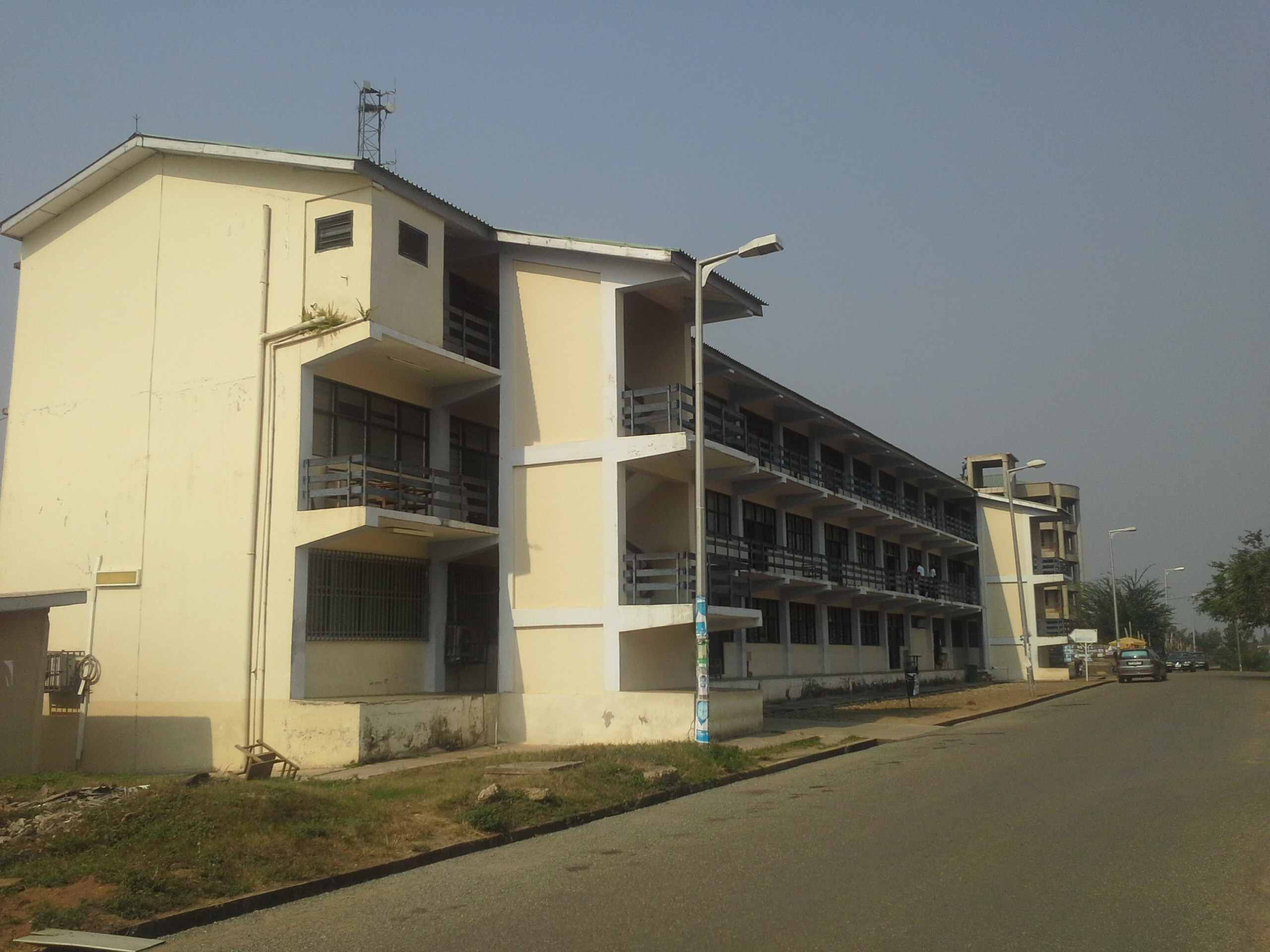
AD block

- Cookery 812/1 & 812/2 and food beverage services
- CISCO
- ICDL

== School of Business and Management Studies ==
Dean: Regina Bekoe-Biney PhD (Costa Rica), MA, PgDp (Cape coast), BEd, Dip, CIAMC-Ghana

| Department | Head of department |
|---|---|
| Marketing | Yaw Brew |
| Accountancy | Mawutorwu Doe |
| Professional Studies | Eric Kofi Boadi |
| Liberal Studies | Jamal Mohammed |
| Secretaryship and Management Studies | Bernard B. Ambotumah |
| Purchasing and Supply | |

=== Non-HND programmes ===
- DBS Accounting
- DBS Secretarial
- DBS Purchasing
- DBS Marketing
- DBS Statistics
- DBS Management
- DBS Computer Science
- DBS Computer Engineering
- Certificate II in Fashion Design and Textiles

=== Tertiary Diploma Programme ===
- Diploma in Public Administration

== Cut-off point ==
The university uses the standard cutoffpoint of SSSCE aggregate 36 or better, WASSCE aggregate 24 or better, and the 'O' and 'A' levels as well as the GBCE/ABCE qualifications, to admit qualified applicants. The faculties also have additional requirements to be satisfied by the applicant.

== Panorama ==
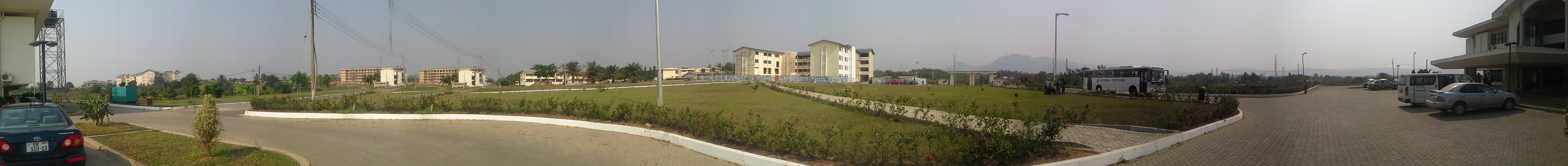
Koforidua Polytechnic panorama from main entrance

== Salary payment case ==
In November 2025, Ghana's Public Accounts Committee (PAC) directed KTU to recover about GH¢817,000 in wrongful salary payments within 90 days. The amount represented wages paid to five employees who had been absent from duty for nearly two years, some reportedly on unapproved study leave or living abroad.

The auditor-general's report attributed the issue to weak internal controls and lapses in payroll supervision. Appearing before the committee, KTU's Pro Vice-Chancellor, Professor Richard Ohene Asiedu, confirmed that only a small portion, less than GH¢20,000, had been retrieved.

PAC members, led by Samuel Atta Mills, criticized the university's management for negligence and warned that if recovery was not completed by February 2026, the institution's senior officials could be personally surcharged for the loss.<

== See also ==
- List of universities in Ghana
- Education in Ghana
