= Emefa Akosua Adeti =

Ghanaian media personality

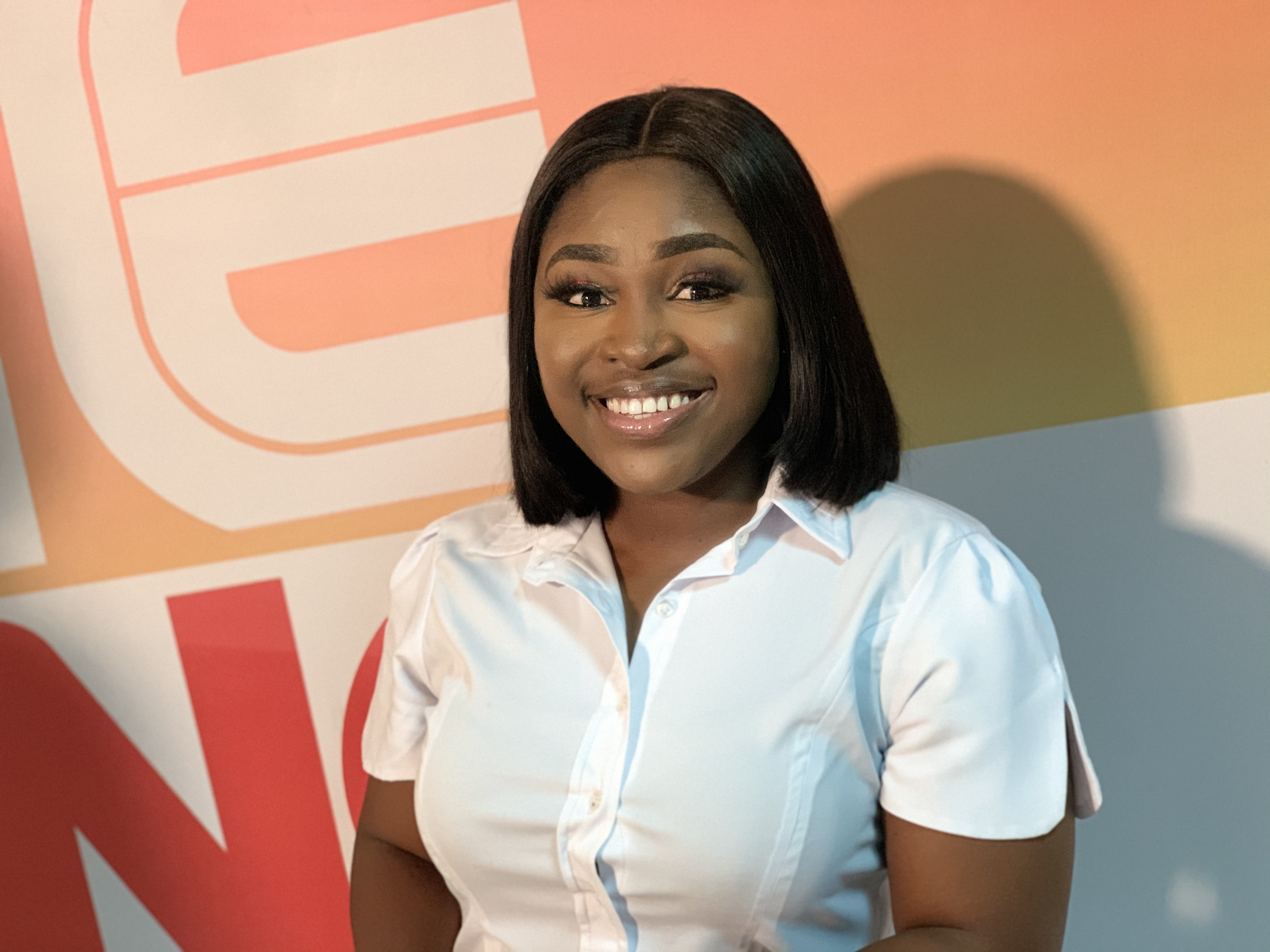
- Born: Emefa Akosua Adeti; Larteh Akuapem
- Occupations: Broadcaster & Media personality

Emefa Akosua Adeti is a TV host and former beauty Queen who emerged winner for the Ghana Most Beautiful Beauty Pageant 2012.

== Background ==
Emefa comes from Bakpa in the Volta Region and to a family of four. She was born at Larteh Akuapem. Her father is Togbe Tutu V, the Awafiaga of Bakpa Traditional Area. Emefa attended Mawuko Girls’ Senior High School after which she continued Takoradi Polytechnic now Takoradi Technical University where she graduated with an HND in Marketing. She furthered her education and currently holds a BSc. and MBA in Marketing at the Ghana Institute of Management and Public Administration (GIMPA).

== Career ==
Emefa is a TV host and former beauty queen. She was also the co-host for Ghana most Beautiful (2016, 2017). She is also an ambassador for Persons with Albinism in Ghana.
