= IAmAnas =

Twitter hashtag and social media campaign

#IAmAnas (I Am Anas) is a Twitter hashtag and social media campaign that started in 2015. Users tweeted to express support for the undercover investigative works of Ghanaian journalist Anas Aremeyaw Anas.

The campaign restarted in 2018 when the Ghanaian MP and financier of the New Patriotic Party, Kennedy Agyapong, announced his intention to reveal the identity of Anas following the journalist's exposé of corruption at the Ghana Football Association. Anas maintains that "being anonymous has always been his secret weapon." Pictures purported to be of Anas were first released by a TV station owned by Agyapong, and were quickly picked up by other media houses. At least one person, a Dutch-Brazilian model, has claimed ownership of one picture that was released, and has threatened legal action against Agyapong for possibly putting his life in danger.

In response to Agyapong, social media users retweeted photos of themselves, random people, or even comic images of entities that resemble the trademark covered face of Anas.

When the hashtag first began in 2015, along with other popular uses of the journalist's name, Elizabeth Ohene wrote an article about Ghanaians use of humour in response to dealing with the expose of government corruption. "I do not know when these words will make it into Wikipedia or the Oxford English Dictionary but for the moment you can take it from me that: To go undercover is to anas, to make secret recordings is to anas-anas, to wear disguises is to do an anas, to be caught in the act is to be anased. To have someone exposed taking bribes is to have that person being given the full Anas Aremeyaw Anas."

== See also ==
- Investigative works of Anas Aremeyaw Anas
- Corruption in Ghana
