= 2015 Ghana Judiciary scandal =

A corruption scandal in the Judiciary of Ghana in September 2015 following an exposé by investigative journalist Anas Aremyaw Anas

== History ==
Anas conducted a two-year an undercover investigation of the judiciary in Ghana and brought out audio and video evidence of corruption taking place.

Following the exposé, 22 circuit court judges and magistrates were suspended and 12 High Court judges were also under investigations.

=== Judges indicted ===
The twelve Judges of the High Court who were indicted in this scandal include:

- Justice Essel Mensah
- Justice Charles Quist
- Justice Peter U. Dery
- Justice John Ajet Nassam
- Justice Ernest Obimpe
- Justice Mustapha Habib Logoh
- Justice Yaw Ansu-Gyeabour
- Justice Ayisi Addo
- Justice Mohammed Iddrisu
- Justice Yaw Badu
- Justice Heward Mills

== See also ==
- Corruption in Ghana
- List of corruption cases in Ghana
