= List of anti-corruption agencies in Ghana =

This articles lists anti corruption advocacy groups and agencies in Ghana.

- Office of the Special Prosecutor (OSP)
- The Center for Democratic Development (CDD)
- IMANI Ghana
- Transparency International
- Child's Right International
- Occupy Ghana
- Ghana Anti-Corruption Coalition
- Alliance for Social Equity and Public Accountability-ASEPA.
- Anti-Fraud Initiative Ghana
- Crusaders Against Corruption Ghana
- Institute of Economic Affairs (IEA)
- Economic and Organised Crime Office (EOCO)
- Commission on Human Rights and Adminstrative Justice (CHRAJ)
- Attorney General's Department
- Ghana Audit Service

== See also ==
- Corruption in Ghana
