= Ghanaian Police Recruitment Scam =

Scandal within the Ghana Police Service

Police recruitment scam has been one of the endemic challenges the Ghana Police Service faces almost every year. This involves criminal syndicates and sometimes rogue officials, who publicize or spread news of false enlistment slots within the police service CASES

In the year 2014, Ghana was hit with a scandal in the Police Service involving a top official in the person of DCOP Patrick Timbilla. On 6 March 2014, after the Independence Day parade, it was announced by the police administration that Timbilla has been put under house arrest in light of the allegations leveled against him.

== See also ==
- Corruption in Ghana
