= Fondation Carmignac =

French photojournalism organization

- Location within Paris
- Established: 2000
- Location: 24 Place Vendôme, 75001 Paris, France
- Coordinates: 48.8678437°N 2.3304966°E
- Type: contemporary art
- Director: Charles Carmignac
- Website: www.fondation-carmignac.com

The Fondation Carmignac is a Paris-based organization that bestows the Carmignac Gestion Photojournalism Awards, which are held yearly. It was established in 2000 by Édouard Carmignac. The organization has a publicly accessible art collection on Porquerolles Island in Var, France.

== History ==
Financier Édouard Carmignac established the corporate collection Fondation Carmignac in 2000. The collection is displayed at Carmignac Gestion's headquarters in Paris, as well as at its offices in London, Madrid, Milan, Frankfurt, Luxembourg, and Zurich.

In the 1980s, Carmignac purchased a property in Porquerolles Island with 15 hectares of land. During a construction on the Island hired Architects, GM Architectes Associés encountered struggles building on the protected land, so they created 2,000 m^{2} (22,000 sq ft) of underground exhibition space. The subterranean space was initially planned to open in 2014 but opened in 2018.

In 2018, the opening exhibition at Fondation Carmignac focused on Carmignac's personal collection of over 300 pop and postmodern artworks.

== Collection ==
The Carmignac corporate collection comprises over 250 works from the 20th and 21st centuries, with a focus on pop art and the German Expressionist School. The collection includes pieces by various artists, such as Andy Warhol, Jean-Michel Basquiat, Roy Lichtenstein, Gerhard Richter, Andreas Gursky, Keith Haring, Martial Raysse, Zhang Huan, Korakrit Ayunanondchaï, Richard Prince, and Sterling Ruby.

Several commissioned works were created for Porquerolles, including Ugo Rondinone's Four Seasons (2018), a ring of silver heads, and Olaf Breuning's Mother Nature (2018), a large red-haired face.

== The Carmignac Photojournalism Award ==
The Carmignac Photojournalism Award was established in 2009 and is directed by Emeric Glayse. It offers a €50,000 research grant to support the creation of an investigative photographic report on regions where fundamental rights are threatened and zones are largely ignored by mainstream media. The winner's reportage is exhibited in a traveling exhibition and published in a monograph. The 2016 Photojournalism Award retrospective at Saatchi Gallery was the most visited photojournalism exhibition.

=== List of Editions and Winners ===
Edition	Year / Theme	Winner(s)	Region / Focus
1st	2009	Kai Wiedenhöfer (Germany)	Gaza – The human and physical toll of the conflict and blockade.
2nd	2010	Massimo Berruti (Italy)	Pashtunistan – Smuggling, violence, and daily life along the Pakistan-Afghanistan border.
3rd	2011	Robin Hammond (New Zealand)	Zimbabwe – Human rights abuses and systemic crises under Robert Mugabe’s regime.
4th	2012	Davide Monteleone (Italy)	Chechnya – Living conditions, control, and human rights under Ramzan Kadyrov.
5th	2013	Newsha Tavakolian (Iran)	Iran – The lives of a generation of young middle-class Iranians.
6th	2014	Christophe Gin (France)	French Guiana – Lawlessness, gold panning, and marginalization in the Amazonian territory.
7th	2015	Narciso Contreras (Mexico)	Libya – Modern-day human trafficking, migrant slavery, and detention centers.
8th	2017	Lizzie Sadin (France)	Nepal – Human trafficking and the exploitation of women and young girls.
9th	2018	Yuri Kozyrev & Kadir van Lohuizen (Russia / Netherlands)	The Arctic – The environmental, human, and geopolitical impact of climate change.
10th	2019	Tommaso Protti (Italy)	Amazonia – Deforestation, illegal mining, and rights violations threatening the Brazilian Amazon.
11th	2020	Finbarr O'Reilly (Canada / Ireland)	Democratic Republic of the Congo – Chronic conflicts and the resilience of local communities, notably women in North Kivu.
12th	2021	Fabiola Ferrero (Venezuela)	Venezuela – The socio-economic collapse, emigration crisis, and lost futures of youth.
13th	2022	Anas Aremeyaw Anas, Muntaka Chasant, & Bénédicte Kurzen (Ghana / France)	Ghana – The ecological and human challenges associated with the transboundary flow of electronic waste.
14th	2023	Kiana Hayeri & Mélissa Cornet (Canada-Iran / France)	Afghanistan – The systematic suppression and erasure of the fundamental rights of women and girls under Taliban rule.
15th	2024	Nicole Tung (USA / Hong Kong)	Southeast Asia – Environmental degradation, human rights abuses, and labor exploitation linked to illegal overfishing across Thailand, the Philippines, and Indonesia.

== The Porquerolles project ==
The Foundation planned to open additional premises on the island of Porquerolles in 2016. The site was intended to be accessible to the public and to host temporary exhibitions and artworks specifically created for the museum and sculpture park. To adapt the existing Provençal country house for this purpose, architect GMAA was hired to redesign it. The foundation also hired landscape architect Louis Benech to design the gardens. The location is situated in the heart of Port-Cros National Park.
