= Double salary saga =

Political scandal in Ghana

Double salary saga is the name given by media outlets to a political scandal in Ghana. Between 2012 and 2016, some members of the John Dramani Mahama administration who were ministers or deputy ministers and doubled as members of parliament were alleged to have received double salaries during their term in office. The law however requires such officials to choose to receive salary either as a minister or a member of parliament.

== See also ==
- Corruption in Ghana
