= Kwesi Nyantakyi =

Ghanaian banker and lawyer

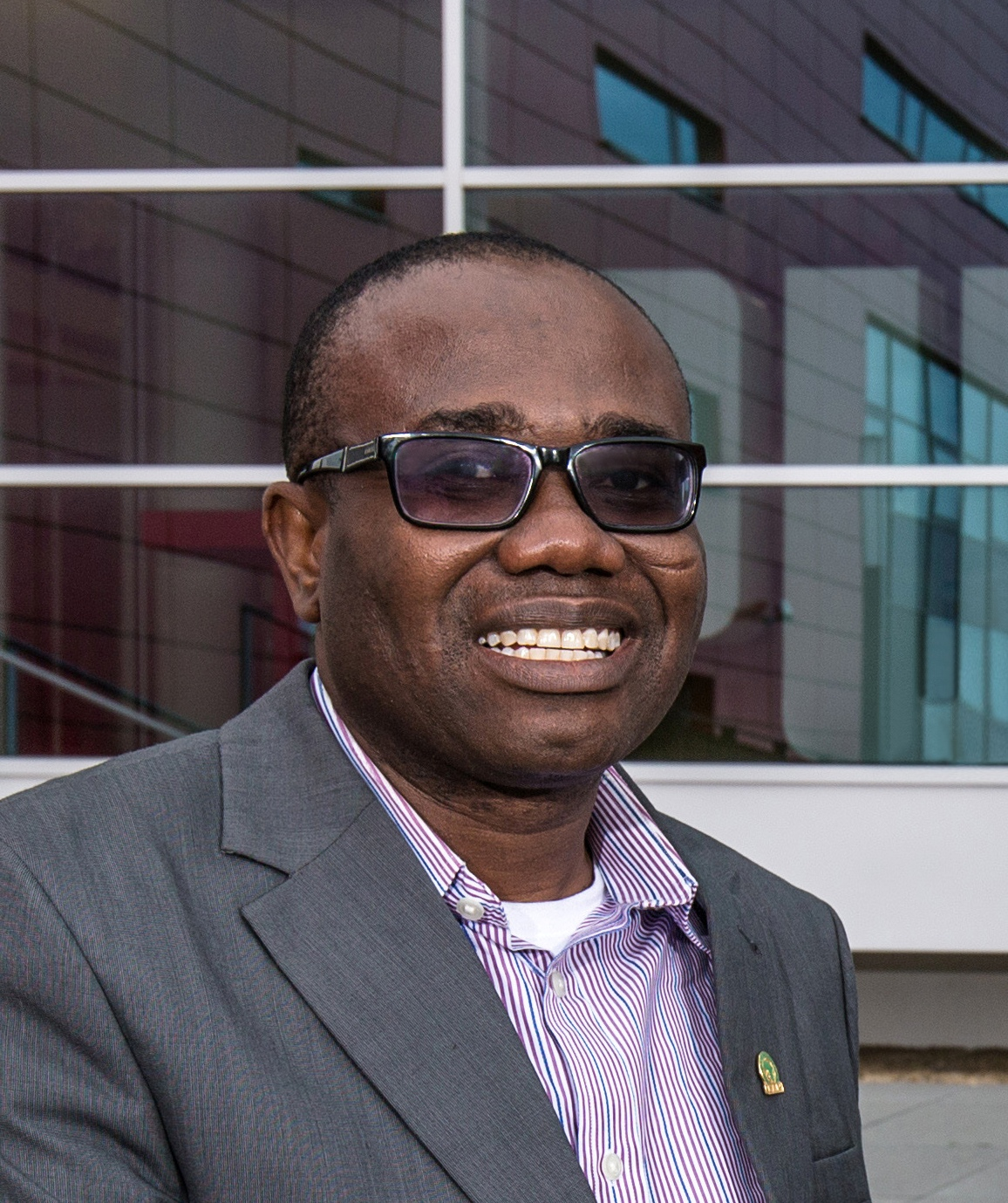
- Kwesi Nyantakyi in 2014

President of the Ghana Football Association
- In office 2005–2018
- Preceded by: Dr. Nyaho Nyaho-Tamakloe
- Succeeded by: Kurt Okraku

Personal details
- Born: Ghana
- Occupation: Banker; Lawyer; Football administrator

Kwesi Nyantakyi is a Ghanaian banker, lawyer and former football administrator. He was the president of the Ghana Football Association (GFA) from 30 December 2005 until 7 June 2018. Nyantakyi officially resigned a day later. However, four hours to the release of his resignation letter FIFA had issued a statement announcing his ban from all football related activities for a period of 90 days pending investigations. Circumstances surrounding his resignation include a video released by investigative journalist Anas Aremeyaw Anas in which Nyantakyi was found taking a bribe and purporting to have the ability to "take over the whole country". In an interview with Super Sports South Africa a few days after the video of the investigation was slated to go public, Nyantakyi denied any wrongdoing regarding match fixing. On 30 October 2018 FIFA officially issued a statement that officially bans Kwesi Nantakyi from football related activities for life. In October 2020, the ban was reduced to 15 years after a reconsideration by the Court of Arbitration for Sport.

== Early life ==
Born to a Waa mother, and an Akan father from Kwaso in the Ashanti Region, Nyantakyi grew up in Wa where he had his early education.

== Personal life ==
A practicing Muslim, Nyantakyi was born Christian but converted to Islam from the age of 47, after his mother remarried a Muslim man years back in the seventies. Nyantakyi has a wife, Christine-Marie Nyantakyi. He has two children with his wife Christine.

== Football administration ==
=== President of GFA ===
Nyantakyi became the president of the Ghana Football Association (GFA) on 30 December 2005. Nyantakyi defeated two other candidates, Ade Coker and Kojo Bonsu. Under his presidency, Ghana qualified for the 2006 FIFA World Cup, the first for the country. Ghana again qualified for the subsequent 2010 FIFA World Cup in South Africa and the 2014 FIFA World Cup in Brazil. The Ghana U-20 football team also won Africa's first and only U-20 World Cup also during his stewardship in 2009. He has currently resigned from this position.

=== President of WAFU ===
In 2011, when West African Football Union (WAFU) president, Amos Adamu, was suspended by FIFA, Kwesi Nyantakyi was given the nod to be the interim president of WAFU until elections were conducted. When the union conducted its elections on 31 May 2011, Mr. Nyantakyi was elected president for a two-year term. He stood unopposed in the November 2013 elections and was re-appointed for another two-year term as president. Nyantakyi resigned as WAFU president on the 11th of June 2018.

== International football appointments ==
Nyantakyi has held several international positions in football. His appointments cut across sub regional, regional and international levels including:

- President of West African Football Union Zone B.
- Football organizer at the 2012 London Olympics
- Member of FIFA Associations Committee
- Member of the FIFA Council
- Vice President of the Confederation of African Football

== Awards ==
Nyantakyi has endeared himself very much to most Ghanaians due to several achievements as a football administrator. In 2012, he was named the thirty-second most influential Ghanaian.

== Controversies ==
An undercover investigation led by The Telegraph and Channel 4 accused Nyantakyi and other officials of the Ghana Football Association of match-fixing.

According to this investigation, the accusations 'involved just international friendlies; World Cup matches would not be affected by the suspicions'. Nyantakyi denied the match fixing allegations by saying that "the report of the newspaper or the media house is entirely not accurate" because "there is really no cause for alarm as far as I am concerned because nothing untoward has happened involving me or the Federation."

In May 2018, the President of Ghana, Nana Addo Dankwa Akufo-Addo ordered the arrest of Nyantakyi following an exposé by Ghanaian investigative journalist Anas Aremeyaw Anas in which Nyantakyi was apparently engaged in some fraudulent activity using the name of the President. Deputy Chief of Staff, Samuel Abu Jinapor in an interview with Dan Kweku Yeboah on Peace FM confirmed the president's order for Nyantakyi's arrest, indicating that the GFA President engaged in influence peddling using the name of the president. "The footage indicated that Kwesi Nyantakyi used the name of the President to defraud some people; constituting defrauding by false pretenses..." Jinapor indicated.

According to Jinapor, after the President finished watching the video he could not help but direct the Criminal Investigative Department (CID) of the Ghana Police Service to issue an arrest warrant for Kwesi Nyantakyi." He ordered the CID to arrest him to assist in investigations and then the next step will be taken. The president is the custodian of the law and he’s not biased. No matter who you are, once you are wrong, he will hand you over to the law. He has demonstrated that his determination to fight corruption and crime is unquestionable" Jinapor noted. He was asked if the President was on the right course since the GFA is deemed autonomous. In response he said: "GFA is not an island when it comes to the criminal laws of Ghana and so an action can be taken and that is what has been done. Nobody will be allowed to go scot free if found guilty."

The allegations and controversies also led to Nyantakyi's resignation on June 8, 2018, as the president of the Ghana Football Association. The unfortunate incident was reported after an executive committee meeting of the Ghana Football Association. The resignation is believed to have resulted from a provisional ban placed on Nyantakyi for a period of 90 days by the chairperson of the adjudicatory chamber of the Ethics Committee of FIFA. The ban is expected to restrict Nyantakyi's involvement in any football activities at both national and international levels.

== See also ==
- Number 12 exposé
