= List of corruption cases in Ghana =

This article contains a list of corruption case in Ghana.

== Cases ==
- SSNIT software scandal
- Cecilia Dapaah $1M scandal
- NHIS scandal
- GYEEDA saga
- BOST contaminated fuel scandal
- GFA 2018 scandal
- Ghana Judiciary Scandal
- Ghana EC Scandal
- Tema Port Scandal
- Stephen Opuni Cocoa Board Scandal
- SML Scandal
- Free Wi-Fi Scandal

== See also ==
- 2015 Ghana Judiciary scandal
- Corruption in Ghana
