= Number 12: When Greed and Corruption Become the Norm =

Documentary on corruption in African football

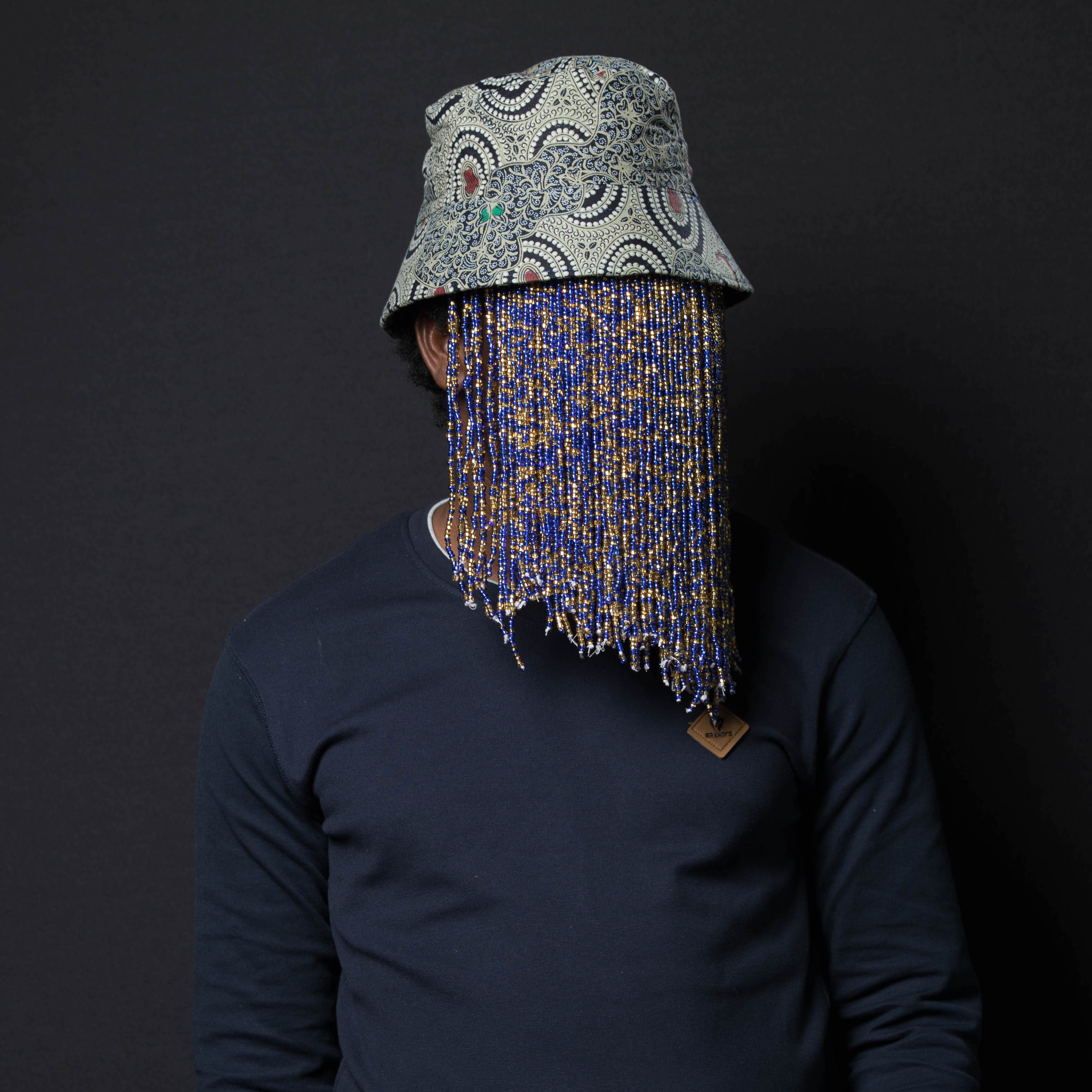
Anas Aremeyaw Anas

Number 12: When Greed and Corruption Become the Norm (different from the documentary released by the BBC on YouTube as Betraying the Game: Anas Aremeyaw Anas investigates football in Africa which showed how it was made) is an investigative documentary by Ghanaian award-winning journalist Anas Aremeyaw Anas and his investigative group, Tiger Eye P. I.

The documentary, which premiered on 6 June 2018, sought to highlight the level of corruption in football and among football administrators in Ghana. The British Broadcasting Corporation provided technical support for the investigation and secured the right to show it to a global audience.

== Background ==
The idea for the documentary was born when Anas was prompted by the action of certain football personalities in Ghana fingered in alleged corrupt acts. Anas' main focus was on the President of the Ghana Football Association, Kwesi Nyantakyi. Anas believed that the actions of the leaders of various national football groups had led to the Ghana national football team the Black Stars missing out on a place at the 2018 FIFA World Cup. The culmination effect of effective management of football activities had led to a deterioration of Ghanaian football.

During the course of interviewing, Nyantakyi hinted that he had considerable power to influence many sectors of the Ghanaian economy. He went further to suggest that he could facilitate business deals and involve the President of Ghana, Nana Akufo-Addo whenever he needed to. Such meetings with the president could be achieved if supposed foreign investors would pay some bribe to him.

Prior to the screening of the documentary, Anas allowed President Nana Akufo-Addo to view part of the documentary that had his name and office mentioned. Subsequent to watching the documentary, the President lodged an official complaint at the Criminal Investigations Department (CID) of the Ghana Police Service. This complaint was due to the fact that Kwasi Nyantakyi had mentioned the names of the president, his vice and others as people that had to be bribed in order to secure government contracts. The CID issued an arrest warrant for the arrest of Kwesi Nyantakyi, who was at that time on an official Confederation of African Football duty in Morocco.

When the arrest warrant was issued, Abdul Malik Kweku Baako Jnr., editor-in-chief of The New Crusading Guide newspaper, expressed his disapproval of how the presidency handled the issue. According to him, there had been a gentleman's agreement between the party of Anas's Tiger Eye P. I. and the BBC and the presidency on delaying any action to be taken to a day prior to the official public premier of the documentary. He, however, said he understood why it was done and attributed it to social media allegations that the then yet-to-be released documentary had evidence of corruption at the seat of government.

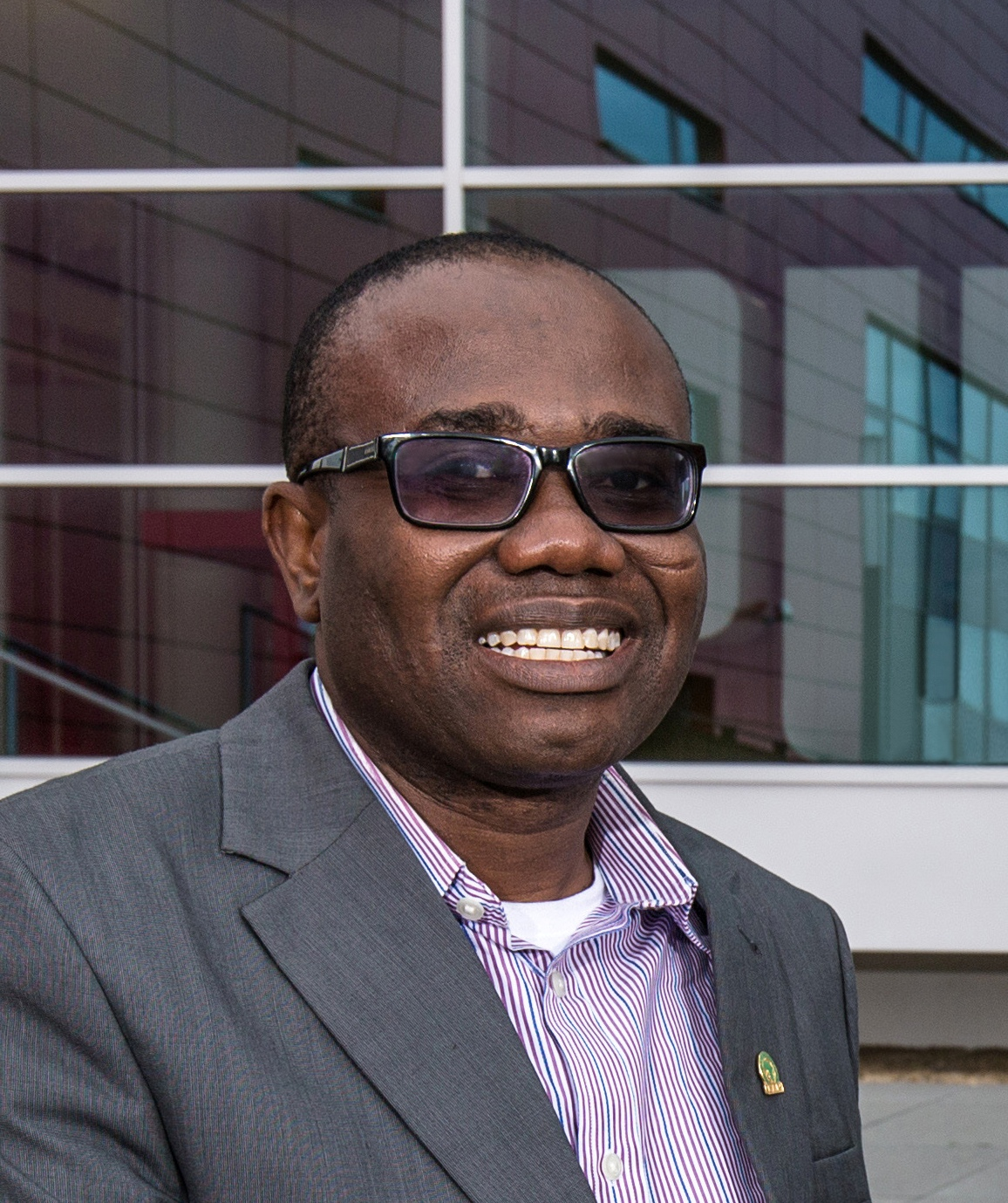
Kwesi Nyantakyi

Due to the arrest warrant, Kwesi Nyantakyi cut short his duty to return to Ghana on 24 May 2018. He was arrested at the airport and sent to the CID headquarters in Accra for interrogation. His phones and laptop were seized to facilitate their investigation and was questioned for five hours. He was released after his statements were taken. Though the initial aim of the documentary was on football, certain Ghanaian politicians were caught in the web. One of such politicians was Anthony Karbo, the deputy minister for Roads and Transport. He was invited to the CID headquarters as a person of interest and was asked to assist in investigations.

== Investigation ==
The investigative piece revealed widespread corruption in football in Ghana. Several match referees were caught receiving bribes in order to favour certain teams. In many instances, match officials and football administrators engaged in match-fixing deals and influenced who was called to feature for the national team or who got to play in a particular match. In all, 77 Ghanaian referees and 14 Ghana Football Association officials were caught in various acts of corruption. The documentary also showed three individuals who rejected the bribes that were offered. They were GFA Executive Committee members Kweku Eyiah and John Frederick Mensah and Chief Protocol Officer at the Ministry of Youth and Sports, Diana Boateng.

== Reactions ==
Prior to the screening of the investigative piece, certain people who believed they would be caught in corrupt deals used various means to deter its premiere. These included some unidentified persons picketing at Anas’ office and at other properties reported to be owned by Anas Aremeyaw Anas. Kennedy Agyapong, the Member of Parliament for Assin Central started a media campaign against the investigative methods of Anas Aremeyaw Anas. The campaign became fierce forcing veteran journalist and mentor to Anas, Kweku Baako Jnr, to publicly defend his protégé.

Some people also felt that the documentary had vindicated their concerns about football in Ghana. They included former minister for youth and sports Nii Lante Vanderpuye. Some members of the GFA were unhappy with Tiger Eye PI and claimed that since the documentary was about Ghana football, they should have been given the chance to watch the movie ahead of its premiere or been given tickets to watch the documentary. The Executive Director of Media Foundation for West Africa, Sulemana Braimah, wrote a piece which he titled "Why Anas' Number 12 is not a Journalistic Piece". In this piece, he tried to explain his point by stating that due to the ways and means used to acquire the contents of the investigative exposé, it cannot be accepted as a journalistic work. Not simply because it was put together by a journalist.

The Confederation of African Football (CAF) in a media release by its Disciplinary Board on 7 July 2018 has penalized eleven (11) implicated referees with suspension, and banned eleven more for periods ranging between two and ten years. In the statement released by CAF, ten of the implicated Ghanaian referees are to appear before the Disciplinary Board on 5 August 2018.

== Premiere ==
The documentary was premiered at the Accra International Conference Centre on 6 June 2018. Thousands of Ghanaians trooped to the conference centre to have a chance of seeing the documentary. The tickets for the premiere were offered free of charge. In order to allow as many people as possible to see the documentary, four viewing sessions where offered on 6 and 7 June 2018. Former Presidents John Agyekum Kufuor and John Dramani Mahama viewed the investigative piece and expressed their shock at the level of corruption that had engulfed Ghana football but believed that the documentary would usher in a new era for Ghana football. Additional shows were scheduled for Kumasi, Tamale and Takoradi.

Number 12 was shown globally by the British Broadcasting Corporation (BBC), which had collaborated with Anas in the making of the documentary. BBC premiered it on the African continent on the Africa Eye television show and globally on BBC News. The version of the documentary shown by the BBC was slightly different from the one premiered to the Ghanaian public. The BBC's version focuses more on corruption in Ghana football and the conduct of African referees as opposed to the local version which was more on the conduct of Kwesi Nyantakyi. The documentary was also released on YouTube by BBC News Africa.

== See also ==
- Football in Ghana
- Corruption in Ghana
