= Guantanamo Bay detainees Ghana transfer controversy =

Controversy involving two Yemeni ex- Guantanamo Bay -detainees

In January 2016, the Government of Ghana accepted the transfer of two Yemeni ex-detainees from the US military prison in Guantanamo Bay into the country for a period of two years despite popular opposition in Ghana. While groups such as OccupyGhana and the opposition New Patriotic Party have described the deal as "secretive" and "unconstitutional" others including Office of the Chief Imam have reiterated the need to accept them on compassionate grounds.

On January 25 2017, GhanaWeb referred to a contract signed between Ghana, and the US, where Ghana agreed the men would stay in Ghana for at least two years after their transfer.

On June 22 2017, the Supreme Court of Ghana ruled that the agreement signed by the President of Ghana was in violation of Article 75 of the 1992 Constitution of Ghana. Only by an Act of Parliament could the agreement become valid. Subsequently, unless the current government submits the agreement to Parliament for approval within three months, the two prisoners would be returned to the United States.

== See also ==
- List of Guantanamo Bay detainees
