= John Frederick Mensah =

Ghanaian football administrator

John Frederick Mensah is a Ghanaian football administrator and a member of the executive committee of the Ghana Football Association. He was one of three football administrators to have rejected bribes in the Number 12 exposé. The others were Kweku Eyiah and Chief Protocol Officer at the Ministry of Youth and Sports, Diana Boateng.
