= Elizabeth Akua Ohene =

Ghanaian politician (born 1945)

Da, Mamga, Dr, Mrs, Her Excellency, the Honourable Elizabeth Akua Ohene

Minister of State

Personal details
- Born: 24 January 1945 (age 81) Ho, Ghana
- Education: University of Ghana; University of Indiana
- Occupation: Politician, journalist

Elizabeth Akua Ohene (born 24 January 1945) is a Ghanaian journalist and a politician. She served as Minister of State for Tertiary Education in Ghana under President John Kufuor. She had previously served as the Editor of the Daily Graphic, the first woman in the role.

== Early life and education ==
Elizabeth Ohene was born on 24 January 1945 in Ho in the Volta Region of Ghana. She attended Mawuli School and gained admission to the University of Ghana in 1964, graduating with B.A. (Hon.) degree in English in 1967. She also attended the University of Indiana, in Bloomington, Indiana, United States, where she obtained a Mass Communication Certificate. She was a Press Fellow from January to June 1983 at Wolfson College, University of Cambridge, in the United Kingdom.

== Career ==
Ohene worked as a journalist at the Daily Graphic and in 1979 became the first woman in Africa to edit a major national daily newspaper. She went into exile after criticising the government of Jerry Rawlings. She is a former Minister of State to the Ministry of Education, Science and Sports. She was also part of the award-winning BBC Focus on Africa team. Ohene was the spokesperson in former President John Kufuor's administration.

When Ohene began her career in journalism with the Daily Graphic in Ghana, it was during a time of political upheaval. She relocated to London to continue her work as a journalist as the publisher and editor of a weekly news magazine called Talking Drums. She later become the Deputy Editor of Daily Programmes in the African Service division of BBC World Service. Ohene lived in London for 19 years, after leaving Ghana in need of sanctuary. She remembers London fondly, even now that Ghana is a relatively safe and stable country.

Ghana is now considered the safest country for African journalists, and freedom of the press is reportedly thriving. World Press Freedom Day, sponsored by the UNESCO, was hosted in Ghana in May 2018. This was a significant gesture, as under the regime of Jerry John Rawlings journalists were often classified as enemies of the state and were often tortured and killed. Ohene was working as the editor of the Daily Graphic in Ghana while Rawlings was in control of the country. She published an editorial questioning Rawlings' rule, and she had to leave the country to escape his wrath. She went to London, and established the magazine Talking Drums, with two colleagues who escaped with her. The purpose of Talking Drums was to have a platform to expose the human rights abuses happening in Ghana. In 2021, she was appointed Chair of the Board of the Social Security and National Insurance Trust (SSNIT) by President Nana Addo Dankwa Akufo-Addo.

She has also been a voice of conscience in the Ghanaian socio-político landscape with her literary writings. In 2022, she argued that the affirmative action bill will be hard to pass as it appears to be a threat to men in position. Subsequently, she opined her voice on Anas's galamsey exposé, citing it as misleading.

== Politics ==
Ohene opposes corrupt public officials in Ghana; she has stated that corruption should be known as "stealing" and pointed out that it is a scourge on progress for any country.

She has stood up for freedom of the press. In 2016, she advocated for a reporter who was banned from the Ghana Parliament for suspected misreporting, stating that she believes a reporter's job is to push boundaries, and that mistakes should be a teachable moment but nothing more severe.

Ohene is in favour of limiting the population growth in Ghana, as a measure to decrease poverty. She supports the work of Dr Leticia Adelaide Appiah, executive director of the National Population Council, and Appiah's proposal that women in Ghana should be limited to three children or lose access to free government services.

Ohene has been criticized by the Volta Youth Forum for her lack of support for traditional rulers, specifically for her harsh words against Togbe Afede XIV, the Paramount Chief of the Asorgli State and the President of the National House of Chiefs, in 2018.
