= Abban (musician) =

- Born: Bernard Fiifi Abban; 31 March 1989 (age 37); Accra, Greater Accra Region, Ghana
- Genres: Reggae, Dancehall, Afrobeats
- Occupations: Singer; Songwriter; Performer
- Instrument: Vocals
- Years active: 2010–present

Bernard Fiifi Abban (born 31 March 1989), ABBAN is a Reggae singer and songwriter from Ghana, West Africa. He deals in different genres of music ranging from Lovers Rock, Root Culture, Hip Life, Reggae, Dancehall.

Abban graduated from Christian Methodist Senior High School in 2008 and proceeded to Jayee University College where he became the entertainment committee president.

== Early life ==
Abban started his music career recording on riddim instrumentals. In March 2018, he rebranded from Da Governor to Abban and signed under the auspices of Irie Ites Studio.

He dropped his first reggae single Agoro which won him massive audience and recognition in the Ghana music industry.

=== Rising to popularity ===
Under Irie Ites Studios, Abban launched a campaigned against drug abuse to educate the youth on the effect of drug menace. He was supported by Stonebwoy, Patoranking and Ras Kuuku.

He has performed at the S-Concert, Ashaiman to the World Concert, Kuchoko Festival and several major events with live performance.

== Discography ==
=== Album ===
- The Otherside EP

=== Singles ===
- Agoro
- Hold Me Down
- Ahuofe
- Pretty Lady
- Hail Legends
- Say No To Drugs
- Coronavirus
- Charley
- Straight & Tight

== Awards and nominations ==
Year	Nominee	Award	Results
2018	Central Music Awards	Best Reggae Song	Nominated
2019	Emerging Music Awards	Reggae Artist of the Year	Nominated
