= Nana Akwasi Awuah =

Ghanaian politician, activist and lawyer

Personal details
- Born: Nana Akwasi Awuah
- Party: New Patriotic Party
- Education: Mfantsipim School University of Ghana
- Profession: Lawyer

Nana Akwasi Awuah is a Ghanaian politician, activist and lawyer. He was managing director of the Precious Minerals Marketing Company, Ghana's former gold assaying agency from 2021 to 2025. In 2014, he co-founded and was convener for Occupy Ghana which actively criticized governance in Ghana under the first presidency of John Mahama and organized two famous mass protests; Occupy Ghana and Occupy Flagstaff House.

== Early life and education ==
Nana Akwasi Awuah attended Mfantsipim School. He obtained a Bachelor of Laws (LL.B.) degree from the Kwame Nkrumah University of Science and Technology in 2011 and was called to the Ghana Bar after completing professional legal training at the Ghana School of Law in 2013. In 2015, he was selected as a Mandela Washington Fellowship recipient and undertook civic leadership training at the University of Delaware. In 2021, he earned a Master of Science degree in international business from the University of Ghana.

== Career ==
=== Legal practice ===
Awuah undertook national service at the Ministry of Foreign Affairs in 2011 before his admission to the Ghana School of Law. After graduating from the Ghana School of Law, he interned at Ghartey and Ghartey Law Chambers, which was led by Efua Ghartey and Joe Ghartey in 2013.

In 2019, Awuah co-founded a law firm called Parkwood and Mossane.

=== Occupy Ghana and civic activism ===
In 2014, Awuah co-founded Occupy Ghana, a social pressure group, alongside Kofi Bentil, Sydney Casely-Hayford and Ace Ankomah. The group organized a well-attended street protest dubbed Occupy Flagstaff on July 1, 2014. Occupy Ghana established a website and made press releases on political happenings as they occurred. During its active period, Occupy Ghana threatened and carried out legal suits against various state bodies for inaction on its demands. In July 2017, Awuah said he believed the protests yielded results.

In 2015, Awuah and Kofi Bentil served as lawyers to actress Yvonne Nelson and musician Sarkodie for the organization of a series of street protests dubbed #DumsorMustStop. These street protests aimed to pressure the Ghanaian government of John Mahama to resolve the power cut crisis at the time.

In 2015, Awuah founded the Citizen Ghana Movement. In that year, the platform represented by Awuah in court sued the Ghanaian government over a power deal signed off with AMERI, an energy group. In 2016, the platform led in court by Awuah, secured a judgement which compelled state authorities to release information on the Smattys bus branding contract. In 2017, the platform advocated for the passage of the Right to Information Bill, a legislation which was to compel state agencies to release information upon a request by Ghanaian citizens.

=== Precious Minerals and Marketing Company ===
In August 2021, Awuah was appointed by President Nana Akufo-Addo as managing director of the Precious Minerals and Mining Company (PMMC). Since 2017, Awuah had been serving as a secretary to the company's board before the appointment as managing director. Whilst in office, Awuah claimed that PMMC did not engage in irresponsible gold sourcing citing a licensing regime change as a preventive step.

In January 2025, Awuah was replaced by Sammy Gyamfi as CEO of the Precious Minerals Marketing Company by the new presidential administration of John Mahama, who had returned to power after the 2024 Ghanaian general election. Shortly after his replacement, PMMC's operation was wound up and its functions taken over by the Ghana Gold Board, a new agency established by a new parliamentary act.
