= Patrick Amoah-Ntim =

Ghanaian lawyer and diplomat

Amb. Patrick Amoah-Ntim

Ghana Ambassador to Serbia and Montenegro
- In office 2001–2005
- President: John Kufuor
- Preceded by: Joao Goncalves Baeta (Yugoslavia)
- Succeeded by: Nyaho Nyaho-Tamakloe

Personal details
- Born: 28 September 1941 (age 84) Accra, Ghana
- Education: Accra Academy
- Alma mater: University of Ghana; Ghana Institute of Management and Public Administration; Ghana School of Law
- Occupation: Diplomat
- Profession: Lawyer

Patrick Amoah-Ntim (born September 28, 1941) is a retired Ghanaian lawyer and diplomat. He served as Ghana's ambassador to Serbia and Montenegro from 2001 to 2005 with accreditation from 22 April 2004 to Romania and Bulgaria.

== Early life and education ==
Amoah-Ntim was born in Accra on 28 September 1941. After attending the Accra Academy, he studied Political Science at the University of Ghana graduating in 1967 with a Bachelor's degree. He then continued his studies at the Ghana Institute of Management and Public Administration (GIMPA), and the University of Ghana prior to enrolling at the Ghana School of Law where he obtained his barrister-at-law certificate in 1973.

== Career ==
Amoah-Ntim served as deputy prosecutor for the Attorney General's Office. He entered the foreign service of Ghana and then worked as an embassy secretary. From 1972 to 1977 he was a second class legation secretary on the mission at UN Headquarters in New York City and from 1977 until 1980, a first class legation secretary in Washington, D.C.

From August 14, 1993, to 1995, Amoah-Ntim was an envoy to the Ghanaian mission in Brussels and represented Ghana in the ACP Group in the negotiations on the 4th Lomé Convention. In addition, he represented Ghana in negotiations with the Committee of the Cocoa-Producing Countries with the European Union Commission against the use of 5% other fats in chocolate production.

In 1996 Amoah-Ntim was an envoy to the Ghanaian High Commissioner in London and represented Ghana in the Quadripartite Treaty on Cross-border Crime with Togo, Nigeria and Ghana. From October 2001 to 2005 he was Ghana's ambassador to Serbia and Montenegro and from 22 April 2004 he was also accredited to Romania and Bulgaria. He is the patron of the Obosomase Welfare Association in London.

== Family ==
Amoah-Ntim is married with four children.
