= Nyaho Nyaho-Tamakloe =

Ghanaian politician and diplomat

Nyaho Nyaho Tamakloe

Ghana Ambassador to Serbia and Montenegro
- In office 2005–2009
- Appointed by: John Kufour
- Preceded by: Patrick Amoah-Ntim
- Succeeded by: Victor Emmanuel Smith

President of the Ghana Football Association
- In office 2004–2005
- Preceded by: Ben Koufie
- Succeeded by: Kwesi Nyantakyi

Personal details
- Born: 7 May 1942 (age 83) Adabraka, Accra, Greater Accra Region, Gold Coast
- Education: Zion College, Keta
- Alma mater: Charles University
- Occupation: diplomat; Politician
- Profession: Medical doctor
- Known for: Founding member of the New Patriotic Party

Nyaho Nyaho-Tamakloe is a Ghanaian football administrator and politician. He was the president of the Ghana Football Association from 2001 to 2005 and Ghana's ambassador to Serbia and Montenegro from 2005 to 2009. He is a founding member of the New Patriotic Party.

== Early life and education ==
Nyaho-Tamakloe was born on 7 May 1942 at Adabraka, a suburb of Accra. He studied at Zion College in Keta prior to entering Charles University, Prague, Czechoslovakia to train as a medical doctor in the 1960s.

== Career ==
After his studies abroad, Nyaho-Tamakloe joined the Ghana Armed Forces as a medical practitioner. He later left for Nigeria and the United States of America to practice. in 1972 Nyaho-Tamakloe joined the Ghana Armed Forces during the National Redemption Council era. He was subsequently arrested for an alleged coup plot to overthrow the then head of state General. Ignatius Kutu Acheampong.

In the 1980s, he joined the Accra Hearts of Oak Management Chair and Board, He was reappointed to be on the board in 2024

In 1992 he became a founding member of the New PatrioticParty.

In 2001, he was voted President of the Ghana Football Association and in 2005 he was appointed Ghana's ambassador to Serbia and Montenegro. He still held this position as ambassador to Serbia after the independence of Montenegro and he ended it up in 2009.

== Publication ==
In 2013, Nyaho-Tamakloe published his autobiography: Never Say Die!:The Autobiography of a Ghanaian Statesman, (2013)

== Politics ==
In August 2024, he expressed concerns about the Electoral Commission's actions leading to the national elections. He mentioned that their actions could lead to mistrust and unrest in the electoral process if care was not taken.

In 2023, during the Occupy BoG protest, where Ghanaians protested against the leadership of the Bank of Ghana, Nyaho-Tamakloe criticised the leadership of the government and the Ghana Police Service for abuse of power and not allowing individuals express their dissatisfaction.

== See also ==
- Ghana Football Association
