= Investigative works of Anas Aremeyaw Anas =

Anas Aremeyaw Anas investigative works

This is a list of investigative works by Ghanaian undercover journalist Anas Aremeyaw Anas, sorted from most recent date to least recent.

== June 2019: Torture Home ==
"Torture Home, when a man of god abuses children" is an investigation an Echoing Hill village orphanage run by Baptist Pastor Lawrence Lamina. It uncovers widespread child abuse, neglect and thievery of food donation at the hand of the pastor and his "caretakers".

== May 2018: Number 12 ==
This investigative work by Anas focuses on corruption in the Ghana Football Association (GFA). Portions of the investigative piece were shown privately to President Nana Akufo-Addo. In the video, Kwesi Nyantakyi – the President of the GFA – is filmed appearing to be soliciting for bribes from some football investors using the name of the President, Vice President and other senior members in Government. The President lodged a complaint about the conduct of Nyantakyi with the Criminal Investigation Department of the Ghana Police Service. He was arrested and later granted bail.

After being provisionally banned by FIFA, Nyantakyi resigned as the president of Ghana Football Association, and quit his roles as a member of the FIFA Council, member of the FIFA Associations Committee, First Vice President of CAF and President of Zone B of the West African Football Union (WAFU).

The Ghana Football Association was also dissolved.

== December 2015: Nigeria's Baby Farmers ==
In this episode of Africa Investigates, journalist Anas Aremeyaw Anas and investigative reporter Rosemary Nwaebuni went undercover to identify and expose perpetrators behind Nigeria's baby trade. This trade exploits couples desperate for a babies and young pregnant single mothers — often stigmatised in a country where abortion is illegal except in the most dire medical emergency. It is also a trade that international NGOs have identified as sinister and out of control.

The team found bogus doctors and clinics offering spurious fertility treatments in return for large amounts of money. In their guise as a childless couple, Anas and Rosemary were falsely diagnosed by one clinician as being unable to conceive children.

== September 2015: Ghana Judiciary Scandal ==
On 23 September 2015 Anas premiered, in four showings, in front of a record-breaking audience of more than 6500 people at the Accra International Conference Center, his undercover film "Ghana In The Eyes Of God". It exposed widespread corruption within Ghana's judiciary and graphically showed court workers like clerks and bailiffs connive with a number of respected judges to influence court cases through bribes. 34 judges and magistrates were caught on a hidden camera receiving enticements of money, live goats, sheep and even foodstuff. As a result, presumed robbers, murderers, drug traffickers, rapists and litigants in land cases went free. The film effectively created a deep and destabilizing crises of conscience in Ghanaian society.

A disciplinary committee of the Judicial Council was set up to probe the allegations of bribery and extortion against the thirty-four judges and magistrates. At one point, the council's sittings had to be suspended following a suit by 14 Circuit Court judges at the Fast Track High Court challenging the legality or otherwise of the procedure adopted by the committee to investigate the matter.

More than 100 members of staff of the Judicial Service were then investigated after Anas submitted a petition and videos showing these staff receiving bribes to compromise cases. Anas had asked for the dismissal of the affected persons and as a result, the Judicial Council begun investigations into the matter once again. The affected judges have since been suspended. Anas was given protection from prosecution but the situation remains tense. The effect of his documentary film was heightened by a number of pop songs, cartoons and other public shows of support.

On 7 December 2015, the council unanimously decided to remove from office 20 out of the 21 Judges and Magistrates cited in the petition. Some were removed from office without benefits and others with benefits. Those removed with benefits were remorseful when they appeared before the committee and apologized profusely to the people of Ghana and the Judiciary for bringing the name of the institution into disrepute by their conduct. The council, where Anas is personally presenting the evidence, resumed sitting mid-January 2016 to continue probing into the rest of the cases.

== April 2014: Ghana's soul takers ==
This was a three part investigative documentary that was centered on road safety. The first part looked at driver licensing and the corruption and fraud it is fraught with.

The second installment, Doom – the silent killer next door, tells three social interest stories of how families lost loved ones to the carnage on Ghana's roads, and highlighted some of the dangers associated with commercial transport.

The third part examines police corruption and the tacit contribution of Ghana's traffic police (the Motor Traffic and Transport Department, MTTD) of the Police Service.

== March 2014: Ghana sex mafia ==
Film built on the Chinese Sex Mafia story of February 2009. Tells the story of Chinese girls trafficked into Ghana and how Anas went undercover to bust the ring and testified in court leading to the prosecution of the traffickers

== December 2014: Ghana’s food for thought ==
Focuses on stealing and corruption in the process of supplying donated food to its intended recipients. Anas went undercover to expose the activities of some Ghana Health Service officers who ran a corrupt business selling food donated by the World Food Program (WFP) and destined free-of-charge to disadvantaged children in the north. Three people were arrested.

== November 2014: Al Jazeera Africa Investigates – Nigeria’s Fake Doctors ==
Anas, teamed up with colleague Rosemary Nwaebuni, investigated the activities of quack doctors who risk the lives of vulnerable people in Nigeria. The film led to the arrest of two people who were using pharmacy shops and beer parlours as operating theaters for patients who were in desperate need of medical attention. It exposed bogus doctors with no medical qualifications and little knowledge providing illegal abortions and the resultant fatal injuries.

== January 2013: Spirit Child ==
Filmed in Northern Ghana, Anas exposed the barbaric sacrifices of children who were believed to bring ill luck to their families. The story led to the arrest of some fetish priests, with Anas advocating for the prosecution of such persons.

== January 2013: Al Jazeera – People and Power, How to Rob Africa ==
This was a film on how African businesses fleece their governments and stash these stolen funds in off-shore accounts. With journalist Stanley Kwenda.

== May 2013: The Messiah of Mentukwa ==
The story of how one woman, Helen Jesus Christ, set up a church in a remote village in Ghana's hinterland and convinced members that Jesus Christ was coming soon and they could only be saved if they cut themselves off the rest of the world. With that came physical abuse and children being denied access to school.

== January 2012 – The Prez’s Assignment – Stealing the People’s Power ==
A three-phase investigation into the power distribution sector in Ghana. Exposed acts of corruption on the part of employees of power distribution company ECG (electricity company of Ghana) and indebtedness on the part of individuals and companies

== June 2012 – Dons of the Forest ==
A follow-up to "In The Interest of The State" operation to busted a ring of people who diverted and sold fertilizers meant for the cocoa farmer.

== July 2012 – Deadly Gold ==
An investigation into the negative effects of illegal gold mining (Galamsey) in Ghana.

== September 2012 – Wild Ghana Project ==
A look at how gullible and vulnerable customers can be exploited, featuring the "Abortion Lord" who had sex with his female clients when they came to him for abortions.

== February 2011 – Enemies of the Nation ==
Undercover to expose fraud and corruption at one of Ghana's key points of entry, the Tema harbor.

== December 2011 Al Jazeera Africa Investigates (Four films) ==
- Sierra Leone – Timber
- Ghana's Gold
- Fools’ Gold
- Spell of the Albino -Tanzania

== January 2010 – Ghana’s Madhouse Story ==
Undercover as Musa Akologo, a patient in the Accra Psychiatric Hospital, Anas exposed patients' human rights abuse in the largest psychiatric hospital in Ghana. In a seven-month high level investigation, this exposé unearthed:

- Gross stealing of patients' food supply by hospital staff
- Neglect and abuse of patients by nurses
- Nonstop use and sale of narcotic drugs such as cocaine, cannabis and heroin by patients and staff

== April 2010 – In the Interest of the State ==
Exposed cocoa smugglers and their cohorts in Ghana's security system

== September 2010 – Orphans home of hell – Osu ==
Undercover in Ghana's biggest state run orphanage. Exposed corruption and abuse of children in the facility

== Humans for Sale: Dons Exposed (2008) ==
This was an investigation Anas carried out over an eight-month period. It spanned over five countries in West Africa and Europe. He worked to penetrate an international trafficking ring, gathered evidence to prosecute a political figure, rescued 17 girls about to be trafficked, exposed corrupt immigration officials, and stood as a witness in the trial.

== August 2008 – Imam's school of shock ==
This is a story of a slave master who trafficked and abused 15 children in Ghana and Togo using an Islamic school as bait. He recruited young victims into a life of begging, using their efforts to amass significant wealth. Anas gathered evidence through the use of a hidden camera, which led to the arrest of the slave master.

== September 2007 Soja Bar prostitution ==
An investigation into one of the largest brothels in Ghana at the time. Anas went undercover by posing as a cleaner. He exposed how some teenagers were forced into prostitution.

He also exposed Soja Bar as a place for hardened criminals and the exploitation of women. Soja Bar was later demolished by Ghanaian authorities and some of the under-aged prostitutes were taken in by Ghana's Social Welfare.

== June 13 – Eurofood scandal (2006) ==
An investigation by Anas in which he went undercover as menial worker at Eurofood, a biscuit and confectionery factory in Ghana. Eurofood was using expired and maggot-infested flour to produce biscuits for public consumption in Ghana and other parts of Africa.

== Torture chamber of Bangkok prisons (2006) ==
An Anas undercover investigation where he travelled to Thailand to infiltrate its prisons as a Catholic priest. He interviewed some Ghanaian and West African prisoners about the maltreatment and deaths of foreign prisoners in jail, exposing the abuse of expatriates in Thai prisons.

As a result of Anas' work, the government of Ghana successfully negotiated with the Thai government for the transfer of all convicted Ghanaian prisoners in Thailand to Ghana.

== April 2006 Passport scandal ==
Posing as a rich businessman, Anas worked to expose officials within Ghana's passport office who provided Ghanaian passports to non-citizens for a fee. He made hundreds of passports using fake identities. Passports were made in the name of the then President, the Inspector General of Police and other high political and national characters to prove the system was corrupt. This led to the fast track introduction of biometric passport for Ghanaians.

== April Bole rebel raid (2005) ==
An investigative story which exposed how Ivorian rebels invaded Ghanaian territories in 2005, made incursions into some northern communities, and subjected the inhabitants to constant torture and abuse.

In this story Anas went undercover in the villages of Saru and Walata. Ivorian rebels had invaded and captured the chief of Saru and some of his elders. As part of the investigation, Anas went as the 'Prince of Walata' and managed to meet the rebel leader, receiving information about the rebels' camp and operations.

After the story was reported, the government of John Kufuor took steps to address the lack of security in the affected communities. The chief and elders were released, security for the affected Ghanaian communities was provided by the government, and the borders were secured.

== July – Torture on the high seas (2003) ==
Anas went undercover aboard a shipping vessel from Afko fisheries to expose the maltreatment of Ghanaian workers by a Korean employer.

== The burger story (1999) ==
This was the first undercover investigation by Anas. He worked as a street hawker to expose police officers who took bribes from unlicensed traders on a major highway in Accra.
