= Kweku Eyiah =

Ghanaian lawyer

Kweku Eyiah, is a Ghanaian lawyer and football administrator. He is a product of Mfantsipim School and the Ghana School of Law. He served as board member of Tarkwa United. He was one of three football administrators to have rejected bribes in the Number 12 exposé. The others were John Frederick Mensah and Chief Protocol Officer at the Ministry of Youth and Sports, Diana Boateng.
