= Tiger Eye P. I. =

Private investigation agency in Ghana

Tiger Eye P. I. is an investigative organization based in Accra, Ghana. It is headed by multiple award-winning investigative journalist Anas Aremeyaw Anas. The organization has undertaken several high-profile investigations to expose corruption, human trafficking, smuggling, human rights abuses among other.

== Collaboration ==
Tiger Eye P. I. regularly collaborates with international organizations to bring to global attention issues that relate to a wide array of human institution. Some of such collaboration have been with the British Broadcasting Corporation, Al Jazeera, the Ghana Ports and Harbours Authority, the Government of Ghana.

== Revelation ==
In June 2018, it premiered an investigative documentary on football corruption in Africa titled Number 12. It resulted in several high-profile football administrators, referees and FIFA committee members resigning from their positions.

== See also ==
- Archimedes Group
