= Corruption in Ghana =

Corruption in Ghana has been common since independence. Since 2017, Ghana's score on Transparency International's Corruption Perceptions Index has improved slightly from its low point that year, a score of 40 on a scale from 0 ("highly corrupt") to 100 ("very clean"). Ghana's score rose to 43 by 2020 and has remained there through 2025, except for a dip to 42 in 2024. When ranked by score in 2025, Ghana ranked 76th among the 182 countries in the Index, where the country ranked first is perceived to have the most honest public sector. For comparison with regional scores, the best score among sub-Saharan African countries (Note: Angola, Benin, Botswana, Burkina Faso, Burundi, Cameroon, Cape Verde, Central African Republic, Chad, Comoros, Côte d'Ivoire, Democratic Republic of the Congo, Djibouti, Equatorial Guinea, Eritrea, Eswatini, Ethiopia, Gabon, Gambia, Ghana, Guinea, Guinea-Bissau, Kenya, Lesotho, Liberia, Madagascar, Malawi, Mali, Mauritania, Mauritius, Mozambique, Namibia, Niger, Nigeria, Republic of the Congo, Rwanda, Sao Tome and Principe, Senegal, Seychelles, Sierra Leone, Somalia, South Africa, South Sudan, Sudan, Tanzania, Togo, Uganda, Zambia, and Zimbabwe.) was 68, the average was 32 and the worst was 9. For comparison with worldwide scores, the best score was 89 (ranked 1), the average was 42, and the worst was 9 (ranked 181, in a two-way tie).

Even though corruption in Ghana is relatively low compared to other countries in Africa, businesses frequently quote corruption as an obstacle for doing business in the country. Corruption occurs often in locally funded contracts and companies are subject to bribes when operating in rural areas.

In a 1975 book, Victor T. Le Vine wrote that bribery, theft and embezzlement arose from reversion to a traditional winner-takes-all attitude in which power and family relationships prevailed over the rule of law. Corruption in Ghana is similar to other countries in the region. Corruption in Ghana affects, among other sectors, natural resource management. Despite government efforts to quell corruption, local elites take advantage of limited transparency and accountability to take control of community natural resources for their personal financial benefit.

Ghana is not a signatory to the OECD Convention on Combating Bribery. It has however taken steps to amend laws on public financial administration and public procurement. The public procurement law which was passed in January 2004 seeks to harmonize the many public procurement guidelines used in the country and also to bring public procurement into conformity with World Trade Organization standards. The new law aims to improve accountability, value for money, transparency and efficiency in the use of public resources.

However, some in civil society have criticized the law as inadequate. The government, in conjunction with civil society representatives, is drafting a Freedom of Information bill, which will allow greater access to public information. Notwithstanding the new procurement law, companies cannot expect complete transparency in locally funded contracts. There continue to be allegations of corruption in the tender process and the government has in the past set aside international tender awards in the name of national interest.

Business reports are asked for "favors" from contacts in Ghana, in return for facilitating business transactions. The Government of Ghana has publicly committed to ensuring that government officials do not use their positions to enrich themselves. Official salaries, however, are modest, especially for low-level government employees, and such employees have been known to ask for a "dash" (tip) in return for assisting with license and permit applications.

== Areas of Corruption ==
=== Parliament ===
Member of parliament for the Chiana-Paga constituency, Abuga Pele was convicted in February 2018 and charged with a six-year jail term for wilfully causing a loss of GH¢4.1 million to the state of Ghana. In June 2009, Mubarak Muntaka resigned from his position as Minister of Youth and Sports on the orders of President John Evans Attah Mills following investigations into dozens of allegations levelled against him including financial malpractice and abuse of power. Ghana's Commission on Human Rights and Administrative Justice asked Mubarak Muntaka to refund misappropriated funds.

The Commission on Human Rights and Administrative Justice was petitioned by a pressure group in September 2009 to investigate Mahama Ayariga for acquiring 5 subsidized tractors from the Ministry of Agriculture that were meant to support underprivileged farmers in rural communities. The Appointments Committee of Parliament initially suspended his approval of becoming a minister pending investigations, which cleared him afterwards. Mahama Ayariga claimed that his application to acquire the tractors "was approved" and he was unaware that there was an "affordable arrangements" scheme associated with purchasing the tractors. The investigation was reopened in July 2017 when a different political party formed a new government.

=== Medicine ===
In 2017, the then deputy minister of health, Kingsley Aboagye Gyedu, asserted that Ghana's health sector had high corruption rates because of its low level of accountability. For example, doctors at the Tamale Teaching Hospital plant agents to direct patients from the hospital to their clinics and direct patients to procure drugs and lab tests outside the hospital thus reducing hospital revenue. They go into agreement with these pharmacies and labs so they profit from the referrals. Ghana's health sector was ranked second most corrupt in Africa, with most of the allocated public resources ending up in the pockets of corrupt private individuals.

The worst affected people are the poor individuals who are not sensitised to medical practices in the hospital. Medical practitioners end up selling watered-down medicines and even request bribes to allow patients to jump queues. In Koforidua in the eastern region of Ghana, a combined team of US and Ghanaian medical professionals were supposed to undertake "Operation Walk Syracuse", a surgical procedure for some selected arthritis patients. It was revealed that some of the local professionals in St. Joseph's Hospital had charged prospective patients sums of money ranging from GHC100.00 to GHC6,000.00 to allow them access to the procedure. Meanwhile, this was on the blind side of the US team.

=== Public institutions ===
The Auditor-General reported financial irregularities by some public officials in a 2023 report: funds had been improperly disbursed to Ghanaian public institutions such as the National Service Authority. The Auditor-General’s Recovery Account was set up in June 2022 to receive funds clawed back by the government from these disbursements. By February 2026, GHC57.2 million had been deposited to the Recovery Account but almost five times that amount, more than GHC280 million, had not yet been repaid because the laws requiring repayment were not being enforced.

== Anti-corruption efforts ==
The 1992 Constitution provided for the establishment of a Commission on Human Rights and Administrative Justice (CHRAJ). Among other things, the commission is charged with investigating all instances of alleged and suspected corruption and the misappropriation of public funds by officials. The commission is also authorized to take appropriate steps, including providing reports to the Attorney General and the Auditor-General, in response to such investigations. The commission has a mandate to prosecute alleged offenders when there is sufficient evidence to initiate legal actions. The commission, however, is under-resourced and few prosecutions have been made since its inception.

In 1998, the Government of Ghana also established an anti-corruption institution, called the Serious Fraud Office (SFO), to investigate corrupt practices involving both private and public institutions. A law to revise the SFO law is being drafted and it is expected to define more clearly the treatment of the proceeds from criminal activities. The government also announced plans to streamline the roles of the CHRAJ and SFO, in order to remove duplication of efforts. The government passed a “Whistle Blower” law in July 2006, intended to encourage Ghanaian citizens to volunteer information on corrupt practices to appropriate government agencies. In December 2006, CHRAJ issued guidelines on conflict of interest to public sector workers. As of February 2009, a Freedom of Information bill was still pending in Parliament.

On 7 February 2012, it was reported that four prominent supporters of Ghana's ruling National Democratic Congress (NDC) had been arrested and charged with corruption in an Accra court. Alfred Agbesi Woyome was charged with crimes including corrupting public officials over a multi-million-dollar payment that a government inquiry alleged he had claimed illegally. Chief attorney Samuel Nerquaye-Tetteh, his wife and the finance ministry's legal director were also charged with aiding and abetting a crime.

Following the numerous allegations of corruption levelled against some appointees of President John Dramani Mahama, an initiative was taken to help appointees avoid situations that would put them in a seeming situation of conflict of interest, hence guarding corruption. This led to the publication of the code of ethics for government appointees in 2013. Primarily, the code of ethics was to be the go-to document to enable officials to know and anticipate any situation that could compromise a public official.

President Nana Akufo-Addo and the New Patriotic Party (NPP), while in opposition, proposed the establishment of an independent entity distinct from the Attorney General's office, tasked with the investigation and prosecution of specific corruption cases. Following their electoral victory in 2016, which was significantly influenced by their anti-corruption campaign, the NPP honoured this campaign pledge by introducing the Office of the Special Prosecutor Bill to Parliament for approval.

The Office of the Special Prosecutor (OSP) was established in 2018 as the gold standard and flagship specialised independent anti-corruption institution in Ghana, in pursuance of the United Nations Convention Against Corruption (UNCAC). The OSP has the object of investigating and prosecuting specific cases of alleged or suspected corruption and corruption-related offences in the public and private sectors, recovering the proceeds of such acts by disgorging illicit and unexplained wealth and taking steps to prevent corruption.

The specialised attribute of the OSP particularly lies in its fortification with the cure of the inadequacies of the existing anti-corruption agencies by being designed as a comprehensive anti-graft agency with investigative, prosecutorial, intelligence gathering, surveillance, and counter-surveillance, police, national security, and revenue-generating powers.

The OSP derives its powers mainly from

- The Office of the Special Prosecutor Act,2017 (Act 959),
- Office of the Special Prosecutor Regulations, 2018 (L.I. 2373),
- Office of the Special Prosecutor (Operations) Regulations,2018 (L.I. 2374), and
- other laws bearing on the suppression and repression of corruption.

== Activists ==
Due to high levels of corruption incidents in Ghana, some Ghanaians have dedicated time, money and other resources to fight and curb corruption.

1. Anas Aremeyaw Anas - An undercover investigative journalist whose works have led to the arrest and conviction of persons mainly in government, who were found to be engaged in corruption related practices. Ironically, Anas has, in some specific and outed instances, been cited in the very evils he supposedly stands against.
2. Martin Amidu - Appointed to the Office of the Special Prosecutor by the Akuffo Addo government although he associates with the opposition National Democratic Congress, Amidu was a former deputy attorney general who was removed by the Atta Mills government for his perceived accusation of members of his own party on corruption charges. Unfortunately for Martin Amidu and the millions of Ghanaians who had put their hopes in him, little or nothing significant has come out after his appointment.
3. Nana Akwasi Awuah
4. Bright Simmons
5. Manasseh Azure
6. Emmanuel Wilson Jnr. The Chief Crusader- Crusaders Against Corruption, Ghana.
7. Elizabeth Ohene

== See also ==
- Investigative works of Anas Aremeyaw Anas
- Judicial corruption in Ghana
- Crime in Ghana

== Corruption Cases ==
SSNIT Software Scandal

Cecelia Dapaah $1m Scandal.

HNIS Scandal

Gyeeda Saga

Bost contaminated fuel scandal

GFA 2018 Scandal

Ghana Judicial Scandal

Ghana EC Scandal.

== Anti-Corruption Agencies ==
The Centre for Democratic Development(CDD)

IMANI Ghana

Transparency International

Child Right International

Occupy Ghana

Ghana Anti-Corruption Coalition

Alliance for Social Equity and Public Accountability-ASEPA

Anti-Fraud Initiative.

Ghana Integrity Initiative.

The Office of the Special Prosecutor
