= Christian Methodist Senior High School =

Mixed second cycle school in New Aplaku, Greater Accra Region, Ghana

Location
- Weija, Greater Accra Region; Ghana
- 5.5445956°N 0.3318889°W

Information
- Type: secondary/high school
- Established: 1960 (66 years ago)
- Grades: Forms [1-3]
- Nickname: CHRIMETO, CHRIMESCO

Christian Methodist Senior High School is a co-educational and public secondary school located at New Aplaku in the Ga South Municipality of the Greater Accra Region of Ghana. In March 2024, students of the school were involved in a brawl with students of Ngleshie Amanfro Senior High School which resulted in the death of two students.

== History ==
The school was established in September 1960 by the Rev. Gordon Nii Akwei Quaye with funding from the United States-based Christian Methodist Episcopal Church. The school was initially located, in rented premises, at Asylum Down, near the Kwame Nkrumah Circle. Originally a private institution, it was absorbed into the public educational system in September 1965. The school moved to the present site, in Weija, in September 2009. The school is a co-educational school. In 2021 Yen News listed the school as one of the top ten senior high schools in the Greater Accra area.

In 2015 110 acres of land belonging to the school were the subject of an invasion by squatters. By 2018 only five acres of the 110 acres set aside for the school were available for its use. During the 2020 Ghanaian elections, a polling station at the school was the site of disturbances between supporters of the rival NPP and NDC over an alleged attempt to sway voters by distributing food.

== Notable alumni ==
- ABBAN, Ghanaian musician
- Amandzeba Nat Ekow Brew, Ghanaian musician
- Anas Aremeyaw Anas, Ghanaian journalist
- Gifty Kwofie, Ghana Member of Parliament, 2000 and 2008
