= Muntaka Chasant =

Ghanaian photojournalist and researcher

- Born: 1985 (age 40–41); Ghana
- Occupations: Photojournalist; Documentary photographer; Researcher
- Known for: Waste geographies, urban marginality, electronic waste ecosystem in Agbogbloshie
- Awards: Carmignac Photojournalism Award (13th Edition)
- Website: muntaka.com

Muntaka Chasant (born 1985) is a Ghanaian photojournalist, documentary photographer, and independent researcher. He is known for his long-term documentation of waste geographies, urban marginality, environmental pollution, and climate-induced migration in Ghana, particularly within the electronic waste ecosystem of Agbogbloshie.

== Early life and education ==
Born in Ghana, Chasant attended Kumasi High School. Prior to his documentary work, he undertook high-altitude mountaineering expeditions. He has a postgraduate background in international relations.

== Environmental documentary and research ==
Chasant’s work examines the intersection of human geography, urban ecology, and public health. His photography documents marginalized workers, climate-induced migration, and the impacts of global waste economies on local communities, with particular focus on the Agbogbloshie settlement in Accra.

His photographs have been published by media outlets including BBC News, CBS News, The Guardian, Le Parisien, France Info, Information, Financial Times, and Der Spiegel. In 2021, his photographs were featured in the BBC World Service series Project 17; his coverage of child labor at Agbogbloshie led to the identification and location of a missing teenager.

Chasant’s photographic documentation of child labor in Ghana’s informal e-waste recycling sector and fishing industry has appeared in multiple editions of the U.S. Department of Labor’s “Findings on the Worst Forms of Child Labor” and the "List of Goods Produced by Child Labor or Forced Labor" reports. In addition, his visual work exploring the impacts of climate change and human activities on landscapes and livelihoods across Ghana was featured in the May 2023 issue of Kehitys-Utveckling, published by the Ministry for Foreign Affairs of Finland.

Chasant has documented the environmental impact of second-hand clothing waste on beaches in Accra. In July 2022, his documentary photography on this subject was covered by British media outlets, including The Independent and The Daily Telegraph.

Outside of photojournalism and documentary photography, Chasant's work has contributed to scientific research. His documentary photographs and field data have been published as visual documentation in academic journals. In 2022, he co-authored a study investigating heavy metals in artisanal aluminum cookware produced through informal recycling. He also contributed to a letter published in Science addressing policy measures to reduce non-functional consumer waste exports to Africa. His research includes topics such as snakebite envenoming, tropical forest protection, and the conservation of peatland and coastal mangroves in Ghana.

== Awards and recognition ==
- In 2022, Chasant was named a laureate of the 13th edition of the Carmignac Photojournalism Award, alongside investigative journalist Anas Aremeyaw Anas and photographer Bénédicte Kurzen. The award funded a collaborative investigation into the transboundary movement of electronic waste between Europe and Ghana. Their collective work was incorporated into the 2024 Global E-Waste Monitor, the fourth edition of a periodic United Nations report that tracks global electronic waste generation, recycling rates, and policy progress. The report was released by UNITAR and the ITU.
- 2022: Finalist, Environmental Photographer of the Year
- 2021-2022: Finalist, Portfolio (Story telling), Eleventh Season (2021–2022), Hamdan International Photography Award (HIPA)
- 2020: First place, Editorial, Press, Environmental, Jury Top 5 selection, International Photography Awards
- 2014: First prize, Snapping Cities, Mo Ibrahim Foundation

== Exhibitions ==
=== Upcoming exhibition ===
- 7-8 December 2026: Snakebite Envenoming: A Hidden Health Crisis, Naturalis Biodiversity Center, Leiden, The Netherlands

=== Past exhibitions ===
- 2025: Unwanted Waste or Precious Resources? An Exhibition on Informal E-Waste Recycling in Ghana, Berlin Global Village, Berlin, Germany
- 2025: Unwanted Waste or Precious Resources? An Exhibition on Informal E-Waste Recycling in Ghana, Goethe Institut Ghana, Accra, Ghana
- 2025: Ghana: Following our E-waste, Change Now Summit 2025, Grand Palais, Paris, France
- 2024: Ghana: Following our E-waste, Foundation Manuel Rivera-Ortiz (MRO), Arles, France
- 2024: Ghana: Following our E-waste, Port of Solferino, Quai Anatole France, Paris, France
- 2021: Plastic is Forever, Rotonde du Mont-Blanc, Geneva, Switzerland
