= Judiciary of Ghana =

Branch of government

The Judiciary of Ghana comprises the Superior Courts of Judicature, established under the 1992 Constitution, and the Inferior Courts, established by Parliament. The hierarchy of courts derives largely from British juridical forms. The courts have jurisdiction over all civil and criminal matters.

== Formal Structure of Ghanaian Judiciary ==
The Ghanaian Judiciary is divided into two sections: the Superior Courts of Judicature, and lower level courts or tribunals. The Superior Courts of Judicature are outlined in the Ghanaian Constitution to be the Supreme Court, the Court of Appeal, and the High Court and Regional Tribunals. There is no formal constitutional structure for the lower level courts and tribunals, as these are established on a case-by-case basis by Parliament. The power of nominations of Justices throughout the Superior Courts of Judicature lies within the hands of the Chief Justice of the Supreme Court along with the power of approval by the President.

=== The Supreme Court ===
The Supreme Court is composed of the Chief Justice and at least nine other Justices, but is able to hear cases with at least five Justices sitting at one time. In order for someone to be nominated to the Supreme Court, they must have practiced law for at least 15 years prior to their nomination. In terms of the functions of the court, the Supreme Court is the final court of appeals in all of Ghana and all lower level courts must abide by the decisions by which the Supreme Court comes to. Though past decisions should be taken into account in decision making, the Supreme Court has the right to depart from any past decision in manners it sees fit and thus can change judicial precedent throughout the country. All matters pertaining to the interpretation of the Constitution or evaluating an excess use of power by Parliament or any other authority figure in Ghana falls exclusively within the realm of jurisdiction of the Supreme Court. Any matters pertaining to the supervision of any lower level courts throughout Ghana will fall solely to the Supreme Court as they have supreme supervisory jurisdiction.

=== The Court of Appeal ===
The Court of Appeal is composed of the Chief Justice, and no fewer than ten Justices of the Superior Courts, all of which need to practice at least 12 years of law before they are considered for appointment. As of now, there are 31 Justices on the Court of Appeal. Unlike the Supreme Court, the Court of Appeal is bound by any previous decision it makes and thus is controlled to certain degree by the precedent that past justices have set. The Court of Appeal is able to hear appeals from lower level Superior Courts and Regional Tribunals on decisions that have been made previously in said courts.

=== The High Court ===
The High Court is made up of the Chief Justice, no less than 20 justices of the High Court, and any other Justice of the Superior Courts who, with consent from the Chief Justice, may sit in on the High Court's proceedings. Justices must have completed at least 10 years of legal practice before they can be considered for the job and there is currently 108 members of the High Court. The court hears appeals from the criminal judgement of the Circuit Courts, and all appeals from the District, Juvenile, and Family Tribunals. Due to the vast array of subjects the High Court hears, it is divided into various subject areas including: Commercial, Land, General Jurisdiction, Divorce and Matrimonial, Probate and Letters of Administration, Labour, Criminal, Financial, and Human Rights. Therefore High court (exclusive jurisdiction on enforcement of fundamental human rights and freedom.

=== Regional Tribunals ===
The Regional Tribunals consist of the Chief Justice, 1 Chairman, and judges chosen by the Chief Justice to sit on the tribunals. The qualifications for being able to serve on The Regional Tribunals are the same as The High Court. These tribunals shall try offenses against the state and public interest as well as hear appeals from the lower courts and enforce the decisions of the higher ranking Superior Courts.

== Judiciary Dress ==
Higher court judges wear British-style outfits, including wigs made of horsehair and scarlet-coloured robes.

== The Judiciary's Role in Democracy ==
=== Preserving Human Rights ===
In many African nations, the Judiciary is responsible for handling grievances from citizens on various human rights issues. However, due to issues around the access of judicial resources and corruption in many judiciaries, human rights violations in these types of climates often continue despite the involvement of the judiciary. In Ghana, though, the Judiciary has a much different role in preserving human rights. The Superior Courts have the duty of preserving the Fundamental Human Rights and Freedoms as is clearly outlined in the constitution that includes preserving equality for all genders, skin colors, origins, beliefs, and religions. Additionally, The Commission on Human Rights and Administrative Justice acts independently of the Judiciary and reviews human rights violations within Ghana and recommends policy changes accordingly.

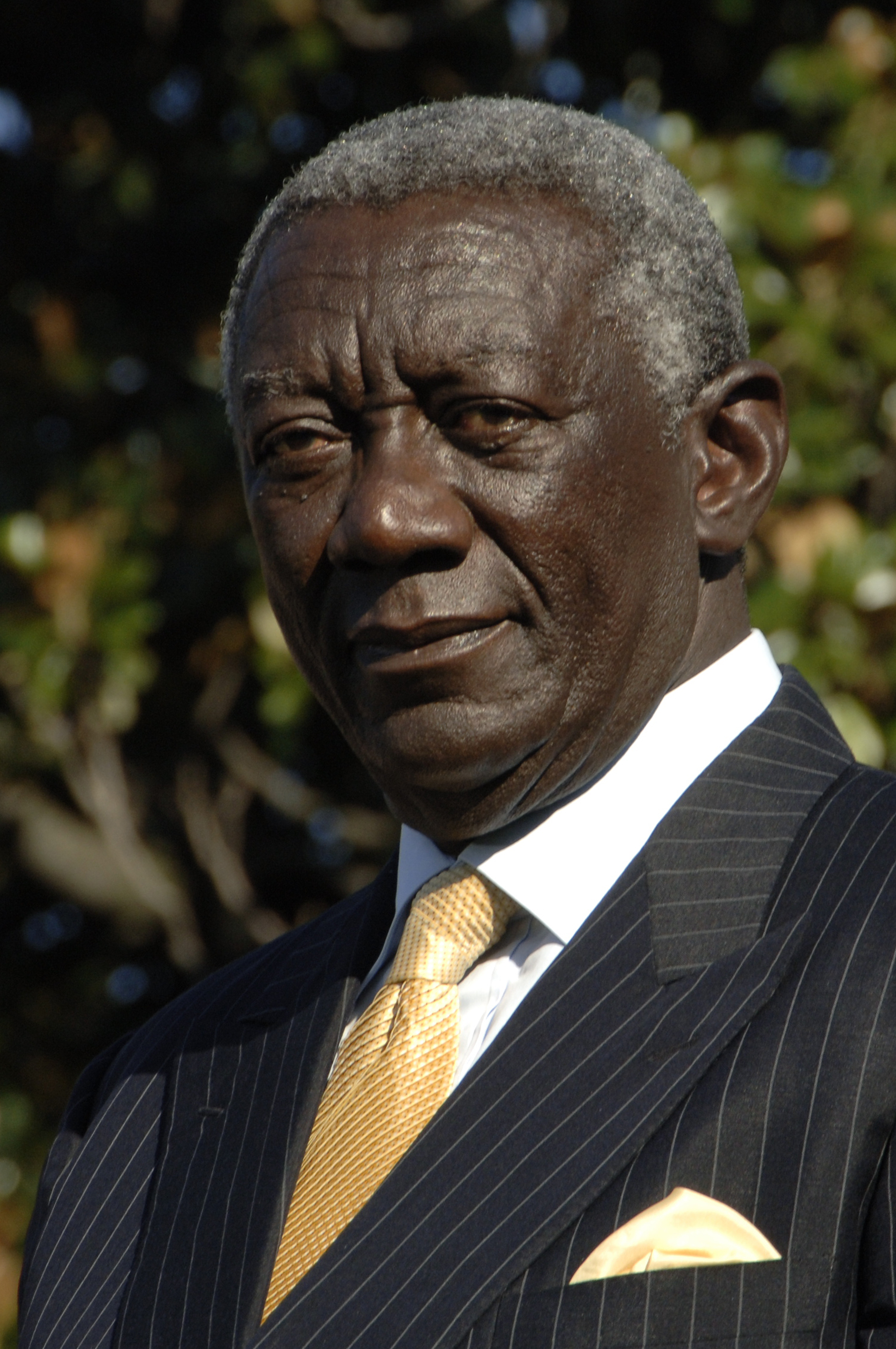
Former President John Kufuor (2008)

=== Independence of the Judiciary ===
The Ghanaian Judiciary has a history of independence that originates from the 1992 constitution that proclaims that the only body able to outline how the Judiciary shall function is the constitution itself, baring any external influence from other branches of government such as the President and Parliament. Neither one of these branches are able to interfere with judicial proceedings and verdicts, or else they may face judicial actions themselves. Over the years, the Judiciary has exercised its independence through a number of verdicts that have gone against the ruling party at that time. For example, during John Kuofor's administration, the Supreme Court ruled against his decision to remove a Deputy Director of Ghana's immigration service, Honadri Okine, on the grounds that it was politically motivated. As a result, Kuofor's administration was forced to reinstate Okine. Additionally, ever since 1992, the Supreme Court has continued to make decisions that strictly adhere to the Constitution, regardless of the administration, and has made strides in carving out a place for itself in society as the upholder of constitutional law. Through all these decisions, the government has proved to be compliant, for the most part, with the rulings of the courts ever since the founding of the 4th Republic.

== Controversy ==
=== The Regional Judicial System ===
Much of the judicial work in Ghana takes place at the lower level courts that hear many criminal and civil cases. As the population of Ghana is rapidly expanding to more than 29 million people, these bodies are often faced with massive backlogs of cases that need to be heard. This has led to overcrowding in prisons as people can sometimes be held for up to 6 years before their cases are even heard. Most of this is said to be caused by inadequate access to resources and infrastructure for these courts, as devices such as microphones and tape recorders only started to appear in the courts around the year 2000. The Regional Tribunals were established as institutions that would be able to hear appeals from these lower level courts and alleviate the stress they are under, but few appeals actually make it to these Regional Tribunals. Due to how backed up cases are, and how costly they are to continue, many citizens have little interest in appealing a verdict for fear it might prolong the process.

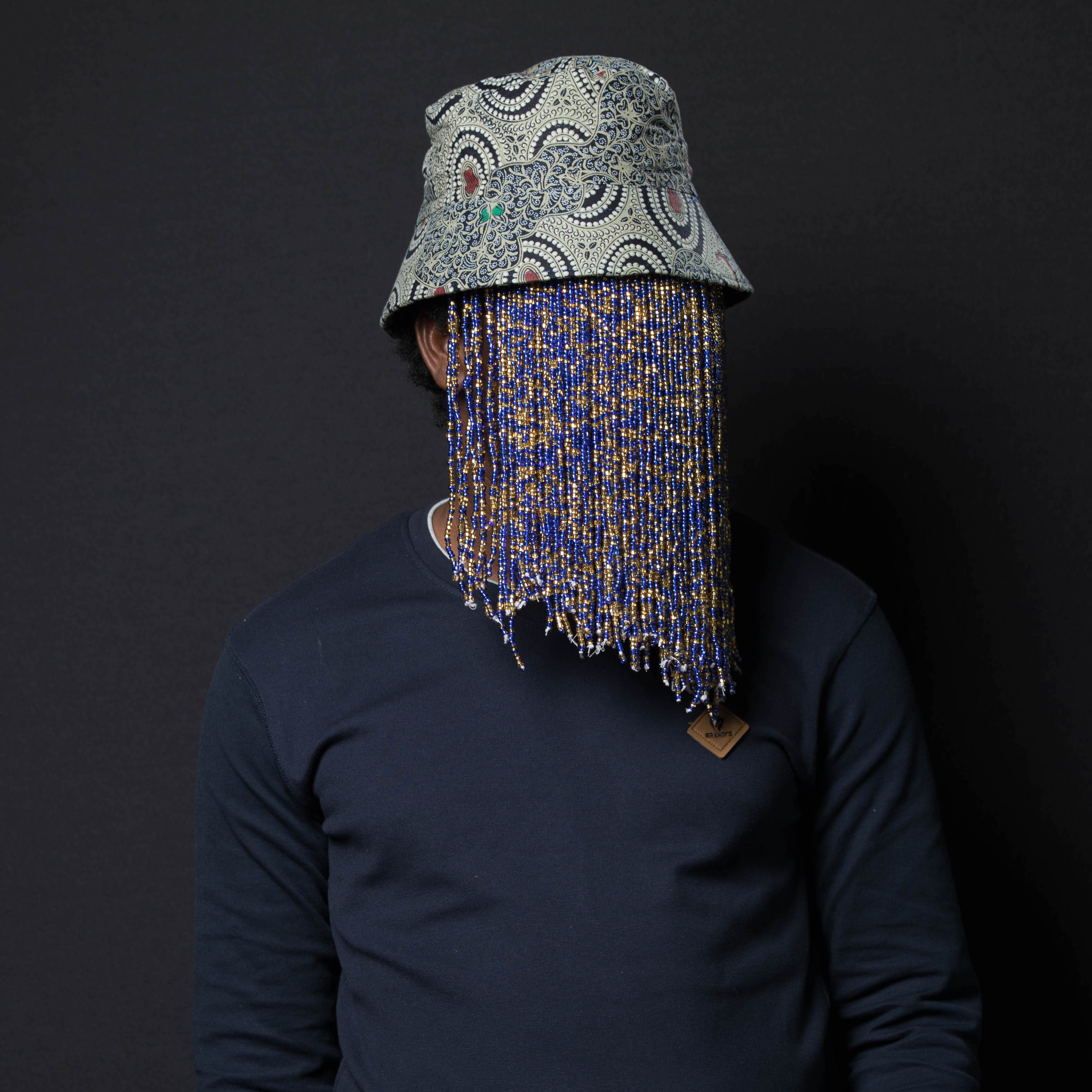
Journalist Anas Aremeyaw Anas responsible for unearthing the 2015 judiciary scandal.

=== Bribery and Corruption ===
In 2015, 34 Ghanaian judges were accused of soliciting bribes after an exposé by Anas Aremyaw Anas, a Ghanaian journalist. The 22 lower court justices and 12 High Court judges were caught on camera demanding money and sex in return for influence over the judicial process. An ensuing investigation led by the Chief Justice resulted in the removal of 20 lower court judges and 4 of the High Court judges. Additionally, there have been multiple examples of lower level issues with corruption throughout the judicial system. In 2013, a High Court Judge and a Court Registrar were sentenced to 9 months and a year for embezzling $50,000 and splitting up the interest payments once it had been deposited. Though crimes like these often cause a public uproar, many citizens really feel that the source of in justice is the disproportionate punishments for high-ranking officials and the common citizen. For example, high level health officials were sentenced to 1 year in prison for stealing approximately $130,000 belonging to another office in Ghana. However, in 2013, a court sentenced a man to 5 years in prison for stealing a goat from another citizen. These discrepancies in punishment would appear to expose the underlying power dynamics at play in the judicial sentencing processes across Ghana, and the struggles normal citizens face when confronting the judicial system.

== Public Opinion ==
According to Afrobarometer survey data, over half of Ghanaians surveyed have faith and trust in the Courts of Law. However, about a quarter of Ghanaians only trust the courts a little, while 17% of Ghanaians do not trust the courts at all. Thus, while the majority of Ghanaians show faith and trust in their legal institutions, many still remain skeptical of the courts

== See also ==
- Supreme Court of Ghana
- 2015 Ghana Judiciary scandal
- Politics of Ghana
