= Bénédicte Kurzen =

French photographer and photojournalist

- Born: 1980 (age 45–46); Lyon, France
- Education: Sorbonne University, Paris
- Occupations: Photojournalist, photographer
- Website: https://benedictekurzen.net

Bénédicte Kurzen (born 1980), is a French photographer and photojournalist. She is based in Lagos, Nigeria.

== Biography ==
Kurzen was born in Lyon. She graduated with a master's degree in contemporary history from Sorbonne University in Paris. She also studied semiology for one year. She devoted her thesis to the "war photographer's myth", a subject that inspired her to become herself a visual storyteller.

Her work has been published in The New York Times, Paris Match, The New Yorker, Le Monde Magazine and Newsweek.

== Works ==
In 2003, Kurzen moved to Israel, where she covered as a freelancer journalist the conflicts emanating from the Gaza Strip, Iraq and Lebanon. It was at this time that she seriously began her photography.

In 2004, her photographic work turned to a more documentary style. She focused on the lives of suicide bombers and widows from the Gaza Strip. With this work, she contributed to the international project of the group Violence Against Women. in collaboration with Médecins Sans Frontières (MSF) and Amnesty International/

Kurzen moved to Johannesburg in 2005, where she co-founded Eve Photographers, a collective of six women photographers whose main themes were "women", and in particular on issues related to motherhood. She reported on HIV/AIDS and on childbirth in Africa.

Awarded for her portrait of Congolese rebel leader Laurent Nkunda (Tutsi rebel officer of the army of the Democratic Republic of Congo and ruthless warlord) in 2009, Kurzen then decided to focus on the situation in Nigeria.

For nearly ten years, Kurzen has been following conflicts and socio-economic changes in Africa. In South Africa, where she is based, she explores the social challenges of the post-apartheid society, producing Next of Kin, The Boers Last Stand and Amaqabane, about the lives of anti-apartheid veterans. The Amaqabane project was produced as part of World Press Photo's Joop Swart Masterclass in 2008.

In 2011, she won a Pulitzer Center grant, which allowed her to produce a work on Nigeria, A Nation Lost to Gods.. The photographs are presented to Visa pour l'Image and the photographer is nominated for the Visa d'Or 2012

After becoming a full member of the NOOR photo agency in 2012, she chose to move to Lagos, where she continued her coverage of Africa and Nigeria. In 2015, her investigative work led to the exhibition Shine Ur Eye, in collaboration with Robin Maddock and Cristina de Middel. The project was presented at the Lagos Photo Festival and Photo London.

Kurzen became a senior lecturer in journalism for the American University of Nigeria.

In 2022, Kurzen, alongside investigative journalist Anas Aremewyaw Anas and photojournalist Muntaka Chasant, won the 13th edition of the Carmignac Photojournalism Award.
