= Dan Kwaku Yeboah =

Ghanaian journalist and comedian

Personal details
- Born: 30 September 1970 (age 56)

Dan Kwaku Yeboah is a Ghanaian broadcast journalist and former spokesperson for the Ghana Football Association during the period of the FIFA Normalisation Committee. He is also the Head of Sports for Despite Media Group who owns Ghanaian media giants Peace FM.

During his tenure as the spokesperson of the Ghana Football Association during the era of the FIFA Normalisation Committee he developed a document dubbed corporate communications policy for the football association which has been adopted by the association for its communications. He was also once the communications director of All Blacks F.C. He resigned as spokesperson of the Ghana Football Association Normalisation Committee in September 2019.

== Honours ==
In March 2019, he was adjudged the Most Innovative Sports Presenter of the year at an event held at the International Conference Center by Pan African Awards held in Accra. Meanwhile, in November 2019 the Ghana Journalists Association honoured him with a Special Award for his meritorious service to sports journalism in the West African country. In October 2018 he was nominated for the Sports Journalist of the Year award by the Ghana Journalists Association and won the award. He is also a previous winner of the Lade Wosornu Prize for Literature. He has won multiple awards as the Ghanaian commentator of the year after winning the award three times in a row.

== Influence in Ghana football ==
In July 2018 the renowned broadcaster was appointed spokesperson for the FIFA/CAF liaison team which was mandated to manage football in Ghana following the dissolution of the Ghana Football Association Executive Committee following the Anas Aremeyaw expose. After the end of the Liaison Team era he was appointed as the spokesperson for the FIFA Normalisation Committee. In summer of 2019 he was named the spokesperson for a 5-member Management Committee which was tasked to steer Black Stars during their campaign in the 2019 AFCON tournament. In September 2019 he resigned from his position as the spokesperson of the Normalisation Committee after citing personal reasons for his resignation. During 2017 television show Kwaku Yeboah slammed the Confederation of Africa Football for what he described as a populist decision when the continent's football governing body moved the African Cup of Nations from January to June.

== Contribution to society ==
Following the death of Ghanaian coach Emmanuel Kwasi Afranie in 2016 Kwaku Yeboah authored and launched a book titled: Coachhene, Football Gift to Mother Ghana. He then played an influential role to set up a foundation to serve the memory of the late Ghanaian coach. The foundation makes donations to the various hospitals in Ghana. Ghana President Nana Akufo-Addo commended Kwaku Yeboah for his contribution to sports development during his victory speech after winning the 2016 General Elections in Ghana. He also organised and raised the sum of GHS300,000 an equivalent of US$52,000 to support the Ghana national team squad of 1965 who won the 1965 AFCON tournament.

== LOC for 2023 African Games Appointment ==
In October 2020 he was named as a member of the Local Organising Committee for the 2023 African Games. Ghana President Nana Addo Dankwa Akufo-Addo inaugurated the members of the LOC in that same month.
