= Fabiola Ferrero =

Venezuelan journalist and photographer

Fabiola Ferrero is a Venezuelan journalist and freelance photographer born in Caracas in 1991.

After leaving her country, she founded Semillero Migrante, a mentorship program for photographers whose works speak about migration.

She won the World Press Photo prize in 2023 in the category "South America, Long-Term Projects" with her work titled, "I Can't Hear The Birds". She was awarded the 12th Carmignac Photojournalism prize for her project The Wells Run Dry.
