= Ghana SSNIT software scandal =

The Ghana Social Security and National Insurance Trust (SSNIT) corruption scandal involves the procurement of ICT infrastructure for the trust at a monstrous cost of $72 million, a price tag that was well over the initial amount estimated for the project.

Journalists were told by the acting chief executive officer, ACP K.K.Amoah that the docket has been forwarded to the attorney general for scrutiny and advice.

The investigation started in August 2017 by the Economic and Organized Crime Office (EOCO) after it became known that the trust has injected $72 million on the procurement and installation of a software system known as the Operational Business Suit (OBS) to digitalise SSNIT operations.

== See also ==
- Corruption in Ghana
