= Leticia Adelaide Appiah =

Ghanaian physician

- Citizenship: Ghana
- Education: Achimota Senior High Donetsk Medical School, Ukraine (MD) University of Ghana (MPH) Emory University (as a Humphrey Fellow)
- Occupations: Physician, Public Health Specialist
- Known for: Executive director of the National Population Council (NPC)

Leticia Adelaide Appiah is a Ghanaian physician and a Senior Public Health Specialist. She was at one time the executive director of the National Population Council (NPC), however her tenure had ended by July 2024.

== Book ==
- She published the book, Human Resource to Human Capital:The Essence of Population Management. In 2024.
