= Occupy Ghana =

Protest group against economic inequality

Occupy Flagstaff
- Part of the Occupy movement
- Date: July 1, 2014
- Location: Efua Sutherland Children's Park, Accra
- Caused by: Corruption, infrastructure decay, worsening economy, holding state institutions to strict scrutiny
- Methods: Occupation; Picketing; Demonstrations; Internet activism
- Status: Active

Occupy Ghana also known as Occupy Flagstaff House is a protest or pressure movement in Ghana which started online as #occupyflagstaffhouse or #occupyflagstaff, and generated into an offline protest.

On July 1, 2014 protesters demonstrated at the Efua Sutherland Children's Park in Ghana's capital Accra, and subsequently moved to The Flagstaff House, Ghana's presidential palace, to present their petition to the president John Dramani Mahama.

A non partisan group known as The Concerned Ghanaians for Responsible Governance is said to have organised the protest to ask government to solve corruption, infrastructure decay, worsening economy, the deteriorating economic conditions in the country, among other things.

The protest was described as peaceful but with initial issues with police permits and the detention of one protester.
