= Anas Aremeyaw Anas =

Ghanaian investigative journalist (born 1970)

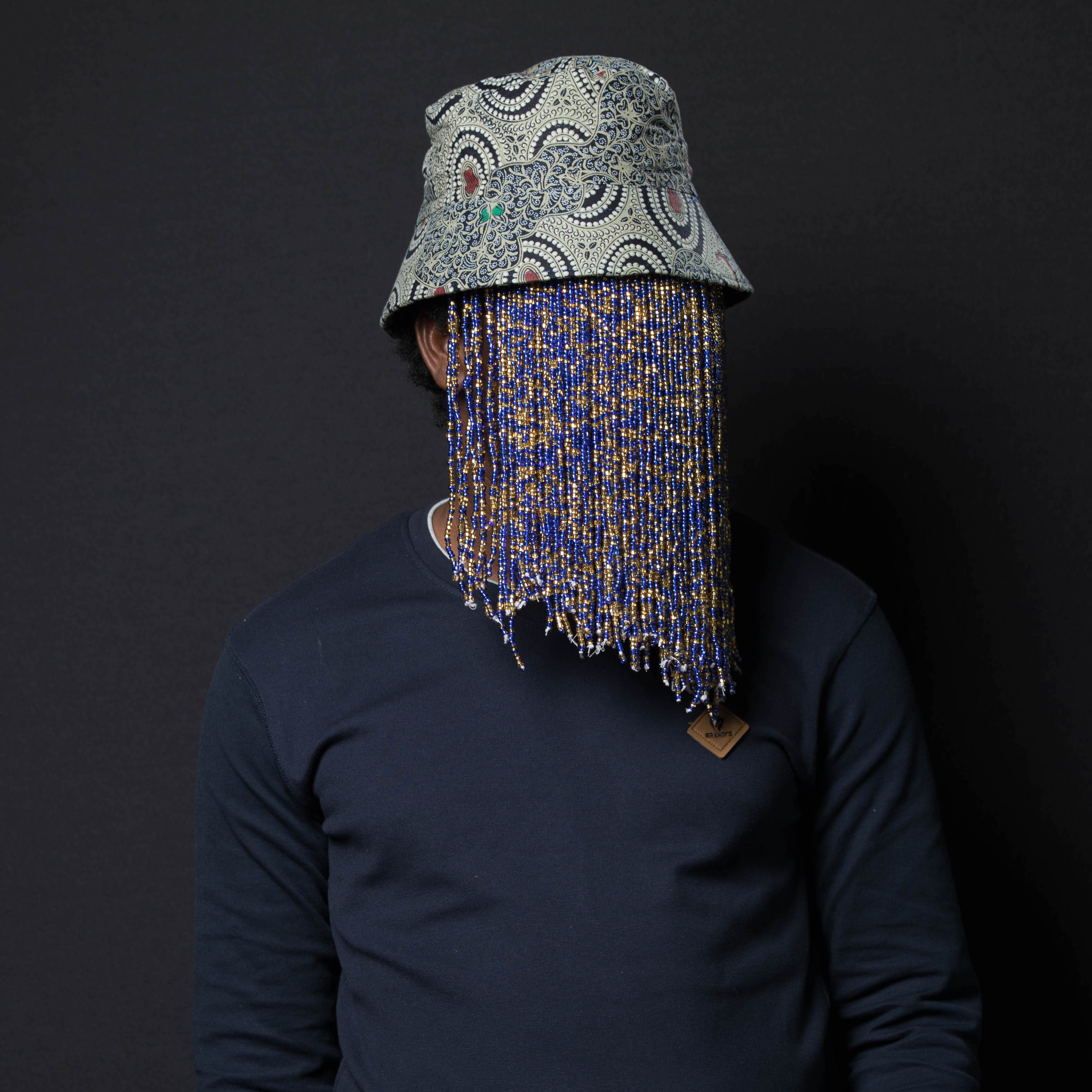
- Anas at Oslo Freedom Forum
- Born: Accra, Ghana
- Education: Christian Methodist Senior High School; Ghana Institute of Journalism; University of Ghana
- Occupations: Investigative journalist; The Crusading Guide newspaper (1998–present); CEO of Tiger Eye Private Investigations; Executive Director of Tiger Eye Social Foundation (2011–present)
- Years active: 1998–present
- Notable credit(s): Al Jazeera, Africa Investigates
- Website: www.anasaremeyawanas.org

Anas Aremeyaw Anas, better known as Anas, is a Ghanaian journalist born in the late 1970s. He utilizes his anonymity as a tool in his investigative journalism work. Anas is a politically non-aligned multimedia journalist who specializes in print media and documentaries. He focuses on issues of human rights and anti-corruption in Ghana and sub-Saharan Africa. In December 2015 Foreign Policy magazine named Anas one of 2015's leading global thinkers. In 2016 Anas had a "Best Journalist" award named after him by the Press Foundation in Ghana.

In 2018, Anas brought a defamation lawsuit against Member of Parliament Kennedy Agyapong. In dismissing the suit, the judge termed Anas a blackmailer. The Supreme Court dismissed an appeal by a vote of 3–2 in 2024.

== Early life ==
Anas is from Bimbilla in Northern Ghana and grew up in Burma Camp, a military barracks in Accra together with his two sisters. After attending Christian Methodist Senior High School in Accra, he attended the Ghana Institute of Journalism. After his degree, he turned down an opportunity to work as a reporter for the Ghanaian Times newspaper, instead choosing to join the Crusading Guide newspaper in 1998, under editor Kweku Baako Jnr.

== Notable investigative works ==
Two of his most recent and influential works are:

Ghana in the Eyes of God. In 2015, Anas's investigation into the judiciary of the republic of Ghana resulted in the removal from office of workers from the third arm of government including 13 high court judges, 20 lower court judges and 19 Judicial Service court registrars and interpreters. Over 100 judicial service staff in total were probed, after being caught on camera taking gifts from undercover Tiger Eye investigators to influence court judgements.

Number 12. On 6 May 2018 Anas released Number 12, so named because corruption was the "12th player on the football team". This exposé implicated almost the entire football administration in Ghana, and resulted in the President of Ghana dismantling the Ghana Football Association. The then Ghana Football Association president, Kwesi Nyantakyi, who was also an executive member of FIFA, was caught on camera accepting bribes. All football matches in the country were called off after the executive committee of the Ghana Football Association (GFA) met on 8 June 2018, and dissolved the Referees Committee, deciding that all officials mentioned in the exposé should step aside.

International football referees were also involved, such as Kenyan FIFA referee Marwa Range. He was filmed receiving US$600 before a scheduled match. This led to Marwa's withdrawal from the 2018 World Cup. A documentary was released by BBC a week before the 2018 FIFA World Cup started. Nigeria's national football team's coach, Salisu Yusuf was also involved in the scandal.In November 2022, Anas released a documentary titled Galamsey Economy, which investigated illegal mining practices and corruption related to natural resources in Ghana. The release attracted significant national debate and international coverage.

== Methods and response ==
Anas believes drastic measures need to be taken to tackle the level of corruption in Ghana. The National Media Commission of Ghana hold that there’s nothing wrong with Anas' method since Ghana law permits undercover journalism.

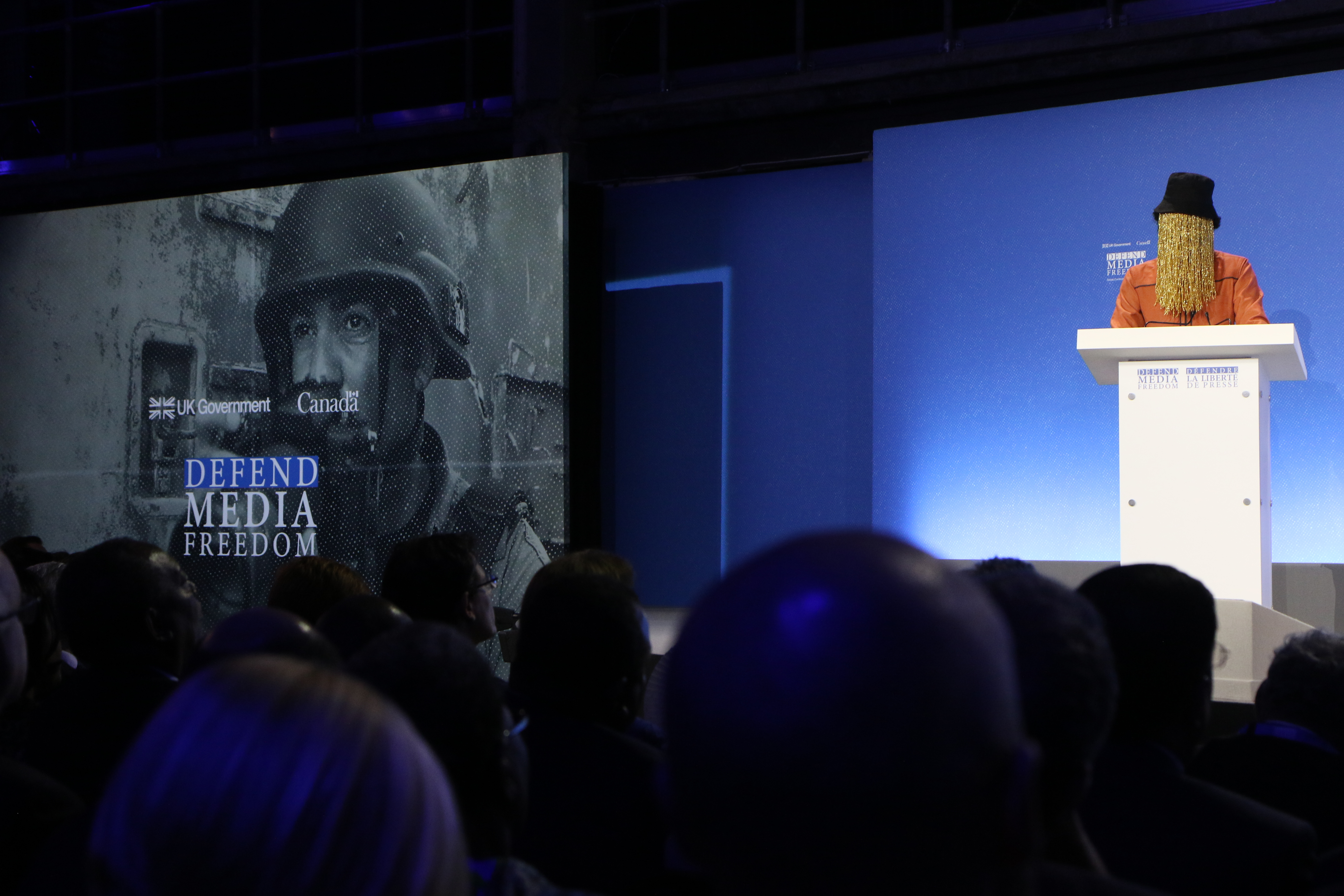
Anas at the Global Conference for Media Freedom in London in 2019

Personalities (in alphabetical order) who have commented on his work:

- Abdul-Malik Kwaku Baako - Editor-In-Chief of the New Crusading Guide, Kweku Baako supports the "techniques used by... Anas." He stated that "Anas does undercover journalism, if they don’t know, it is accepted universally. It comes with challenges, ethical as well as moral".
- Jerry John Rawlings - In reacting to Anas's critics, former president Rawlings said that "Anas should be hailed and not treated like an outcast". About the backlash from sections of the Ghanaian public concerning Anas's method, Rawlings added that "When we had the chance, we made an outcast of our own allowing our rivals to recognize the true worth and offer him such a sensitive national anti-corruption role. What does that make of us?"
- John Atta Mills - In 2015 it emerged that at least one of Anas's investigations was commissioned by the government of Ghana. Notably, "The President's Assignment"; an exposé from 2012 that unearthed corruption incidents at the Electricity Company of Ghana, was commissioned by the Professor Evans Mills, suggesting that the late president condoned Anas's modus operandi. Earlier in 2011, president Mills reprimanded security agencies during a surprise visit to the Customs Excise and Preventive Service following a corruption exposé involving customs officers, stating that, "I wish that the revelation from Anas could have come to me from the security agencies who work here. There are people who come here throwing their weight around. I have told General Modey that anyone who comes here in the President's name, the first thing you should do is to arrest them. I am not going to be party to anything which will destroy what we are building in this country".
- Kofi Annan - Appearing in a promotional video leading to the public premiering of the Ghana Football Association cash gift scandal, the former United Nations secretary general said that "Sometimes it takes a spark, just a spark and I think Anas has provided that spark for the whole edifice to blow up for people to wake up and say: ‘No more’".
- Kennedy Agyapong - According to the Assign Central MP, who has repeatedly threatened Anas, as reported by the Committee to Protect Journalists and Reporters Without Borders he stated that Anas's methods were 'unfair'. Following these and other allegations Anas responded "I've never in my life taken a bribe.... Nowhere! Whoever has a proof should bring it. It will crash. I know myself and I believe in myself. I know I’ve never taken bribe from anywhere... Some people are just blowing hot air” He also called for "retribution" against Anas' collaborator, Ahmed Hussein-Suale, saying "If he comes here, beat him... Whatever happens, I'll pay." Hussein-Suale was subsequently assassinated.
- Mahamudu Bawumia - In defending the methodology of Anas, vice president of Ghana Dr. Bawumia said that "what Anas is doing is very relevant...people should know that what they do in the dark can be exposed...Really, I will encourage him to do what he does".

== Other works ==
From October to December 2016, Anas ventured outside of the world of investigative journalism as an advocate for peace in his "Anas4Peace" multimedia campaign. These films, jingles and interactive social media posts brought together 22 non-aligned Ghanaian celebrities to advocate for peace during the election period. The #IAmAnas movement celebrating Anas's anonymity has also attracted media attention. In October 2018, Anas launched an online platform for members of the public to upload videos reporting corruption.

== Litigation ==
In 2018, Anas Aremeyaw Anas brought a defamation lawsuit against Member of Parliament Kennedy Agyapong. On 15 March 2023 the judge dismissed the case calling Anas a blackmailer who uses blackmail to extort money from his opponents and people he does not like. His work was described as investigative terrorism and not investigative journalism. In 2024, the Supreme Court upheld the dismissal by a 3–2 vote but declined the defendant's motion to impose his legal costs on the plaintiff.

== Awards and recognition ==
- Ghana Journalism Association Awards, Best Investigative Reporting 2004
- Ghana Journalism Association Awards, Best Investigative Reporter 2005
- Ghana Journalism Association Awards, Best Investigative Reporter 2006
- Ghana Journalism Association Awards, Journalist of the Year 2006
- Global Investigative Journalist Conference - Global Shining Light Awards (2007)
- Every Human Has Rights Media Award, Every Human Has Rights Award and Internews, The Elders - France (2008)
- Hero Acting to End Modern-Day Slavery Award, The US Department of State Washington DC - USA (2008)
- Ghana Journalism Association Awards, Best Investigative Reporter 2008
- The Lorenzo Natali Prize, European Union Journalism Prize for Development, Democracy and Human Rights - Ghana. (2009)
- The Segbo Excellence, Investigative Journalism 2009
- Nobert Zongo Prize for Investigative Reporting, Written Journalism 2009
- 2010 Excellence in Media Award : Community Reporting, Global Health Council
- Ghana Journalists’ Association Awards, Bastion of Excellence in Investigative Journalism 2011
- European Union Journalism Prize for Development, Democracy and Human Rights, The Lorenzo Natali Award 2011
- KCK International Award for Excellence in Print Journalism - Patrika Group (2011).
- Ghana's Most Influential 2011 - ETV Ghana (2011)
- Annual Percy Qoboza Award, National Association of Black Journalists, 2012
- DIAGEO Africa Business Reporting Awards, Best Environmental Feature 2012
- African Achievers Awards 2013
- Ghana's Most Influential - ETV Ghana (2013)
- 13th Carmignac Photojournalism Award, alongside photojournalists Muntaka Chasant and Bénédicte Kurzen, 2022.
